= List of islands in the Ryukyu Archipelago =

The Ryukyu Archipelago (Japanese: 琉球列島, Ryūkyū-rettō) are a collection of 100+ islands located between Kyushu and Taiwan. They are politically split between the Japanese prefectures of Okinawa and Kagoshima.

== Kagoshima Prefecture ==
The northernmost parts of the Ryukyu Islands are within Kagoshima Prefecture. These islands are referred to as the Satsunan Islands (薩南諸島, Satsunan-shotō), meaning “south of Satsuma”, as they were the southernmost territories of the Satsuma Domain.

=== Ōsumi Islands ===
- Yakushima
- Tanegashima
- Kuchinoerabu-jima
- Mageshima
- Kuroshima (Kagoshima)
- Iōjima (Kagoshima)
- Takeshima (Kagoshima)
- Shōwa Iōjima
- Denshima

=== Tokara Islands ===
- Hirase
- Kuchinoshima
- Nakanoshima (Kagoshima)
- Gajajima
- Kogajajima
- Tairajima
- Suwanosejima
- Akusekijima
- Kojima
- Kodakarajima
- Takarajima
- Kaminonejima
- Yokoate-jima

=== Amami Islands ===
- Amami Ōshima
- Kikaijima
- Kakeromajima
- Yoroshima
- Uke Island
- Tokunoshima
- Okinoerabujima
- Yoronjima
- Edateku Island
- Sukomobanare Island
- Yubanare Island
- Kiyama Island

== Okinawa Prefecture ==
Islands south of the Satsunan Islands are administered by Okinawa Prefecture. Its predecessor was the Ryukyu Kingdom, an independent nation until 1879.

Japan has de facto control over the disputed Senkaku Islands, claiming them as part of Ishigaki City in Okinawa Prefecture. However, they are not geographically within the Ryukyu Archipelago, being located further westward in the East China Sea.

=== Okinawa Islands ===
- Okinawa Island
- Iheya Island
- Izena Island
- Iejima
- Sesoko Island
- Yokatsu Islands
  - Ikei Island
  - Hamahiga Island
  - Henza Island
  - Minamiukibara Island
  - Miyagi Island
  - Tsuken Island
  - Ukibara Island
  - Yabuchi Island
- Kume Island
- Kerama Islands
  - Tokashiki Island
  - Zamami Island
  - Aka Island
  - Geruma Island
- Aguni Islands
  - Aguni Island
  - Tonaki Island
  - Irisuna-jima

=== Miyako Islands ===
- Miyako-jima
- Ikema Island
- Irabu Island
- Kurima-jima
- Ogami Island
- Shimoji-shima
- Minna Island (Tarama, Okinawa)
- Tarama Island

=== Yaeyama Islands ===
- Ishigaki Island
- Aragusuku Islands
- Hateruma
- Iriomote Island
- Kayama Island
- Kohama Island
- Kuroshima (Okinawa)
- Sotobanari
- Taketomi Island
- Yubu Island
- Hatoma
- Yonaguni

=== Daitō Islands ===
- Minamidaitōjima
- Kitadaitōjima
- Okidaitōjima

== Islands ==
List of inhabited islands by population over 500.

Prefecture	Island	District	Pop	Area
Okinawa	Okinawa		1,335,827	1,207
Kagoshima	Amami Ōshima	Amami-Ōshima	57,919	712.3
Okinawa	Miyako	Miyakojima	47,676	158.9
Okinawa	Ishigaki	Ishigaki	47,637	222.2
Kagoshima	Tanegashima	Nishinoomote-Kumage	26,946	445
Kagoshima	Tokunoshima	Ōshima	21,803	247.7
Kagoshima	Yakushima	Kumage	12,509	504.9
Kagoshima	Okinoerabujima	Ōshima	11,996	93.6
Okinawa	Kume	Shimajiri	7,155	59.1
Kagoshima	Kikaijima	Ōshima	6,629	56.9
Kagoshima	Yoronjima	Ōshima	5,115	20.8
Okinawa	Irabu (Note: Includes Shimoji)	Miyakojima	4,582	38.7
Okinawa	Iejima	Kunigami	4,118	23
Okinawa	Iromote	Yaeyama	2,253	289.2
Kagoshima	Shimokoshiki-shima	Satsumasenda	1,935	66.1
Kagoshima	Kamikoshiki-shima	Satsumasenda	1,822	45.1
Okinawa	Yonaguni	Yaeyama	1,676	28.9
Okinawa	Izena	Shimajiri	1,322	15.4
Okinawa	Minamidaitojima	Shimajiri	1,285	30.5
Okinawa	Yagaji	Nago	1,256	7.8
Okinawa	Henza	Uruma	1,129	5.3
Kagoshima	Kakeromajima	Ōshima	1,080	77.4
Okinawa	Tarama	Miyako	1,054	22
Okinawa	Iheya	Shimajiri	1,040	20.6
Okinawa	Sesoko (Note: Includes Minna Island)	Kunigami	862	3.5
Okinawa	Ou	Nanjō	740	0.2
Okinawa	Tokashiki	Shimajiri	718	15.3
Okinawa	Aguni	Shimajiri	683	7.6
Okinawa	Miyagi	Uruma	657	5.5
Okinawa	Kohama	Yaeyama	621	7.8
Okinawa	Kitadaitojima	Shimajiri	590	11.9
Okinawa	Zamami	Shimajiri	581	6.7
Okinawa	Ikema	Miyakojima	511	2.8

== See also ==
- Ryukyu Islands
