= Mid-Sea Road =

Road in Okinawa Prefecture, Japan

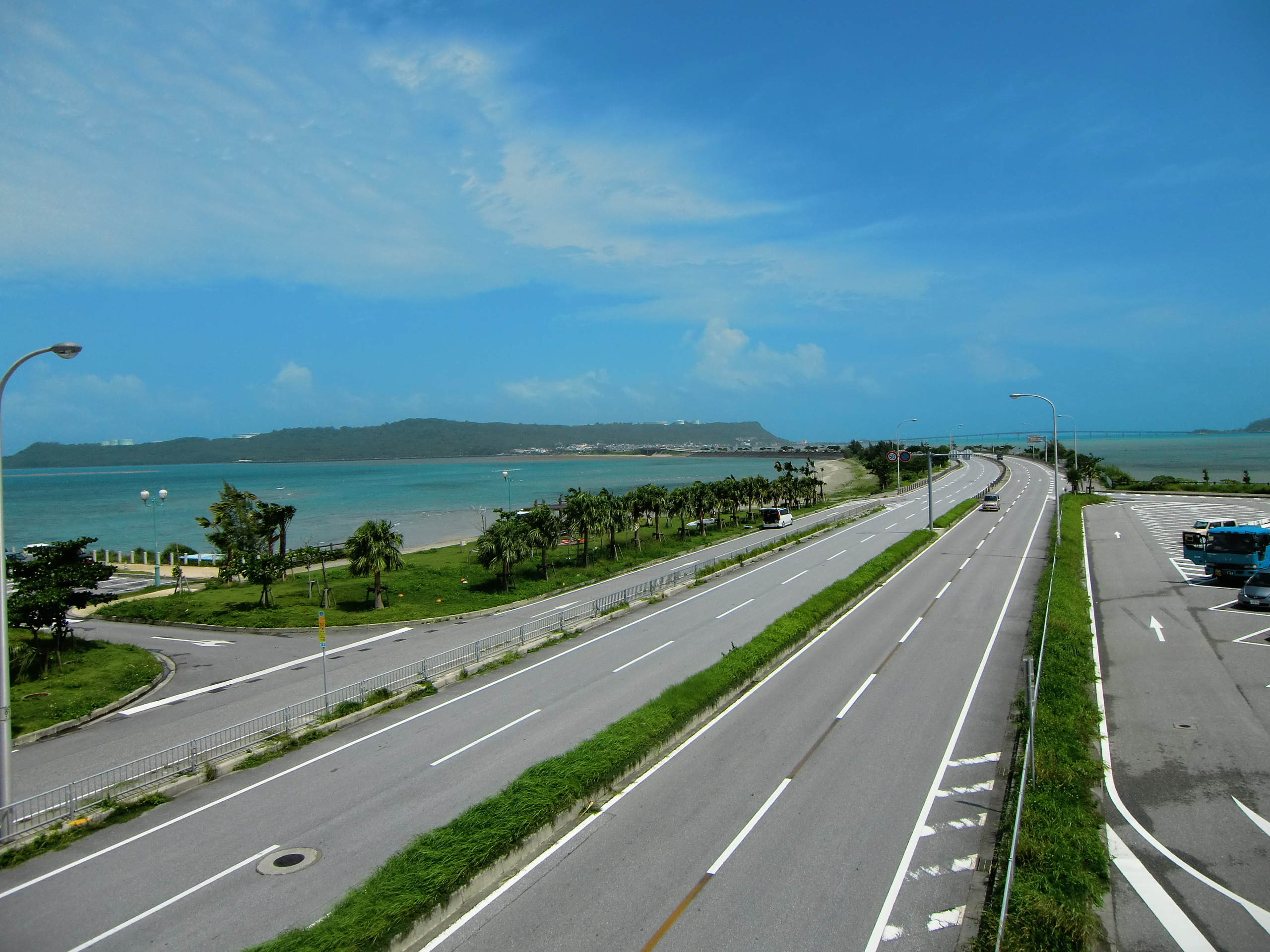
The road in September 2010

Uruma City and Henza Island, The road is visible on magnification

The Mid-Sea Road (海中道路, Kaichū Dōro) is a road in Uruma, Okinawa, Japan. 4.7 kilometres (2.9 mi) long, it forms part of Okinawa Prefectural Road No. 10 and runs across the sea.

== Construction ==
The road consists of a causeway with a bridge so vessels may pass. There are two rivers or water lanes for preventing seawater contamination.

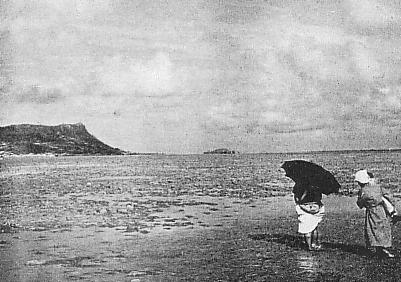
Crossing on foot between the Katsuren Peninsula and Henza Island around 1955

== History ==
An area of shoal extended between the Yakena area of the Katsuren Peninsula and Henza Island. At low tide, it was shallow enough for people to walk across on the sea bed. Since 1956, amphibious vehicles, or used trucks of United States origin, drove to and from the island. In 1960, islanders started a campaign for the construction of a road connecting the island and the peninsula. Construction began, but a typhoon came and interrupted the progress. In 1970, Gulf Oil started constructing port facilities for petroleum storage and reshipment on Henza Island.

Gulf funded the construction of The Mid-Sea road. Construction started in May 1971 and was completed April 22, 1972 as a two-lane road. The completed Mid-Sea Road was presented to the Yonashiro Village free of charge in 1974 and became a village road. In 1991, it was made a prefectural road. In 1999, the road was expanded to 4-lanes.

== Katsuren Peninsula and other islands ==
On the Katsuren Peninsula is Katsuren Castle. Connected by the Mid-Sea Road are the Katsuren Peninsula, Henza Island, Miyagi Island, Ikei Island, and Hamahiga Island.

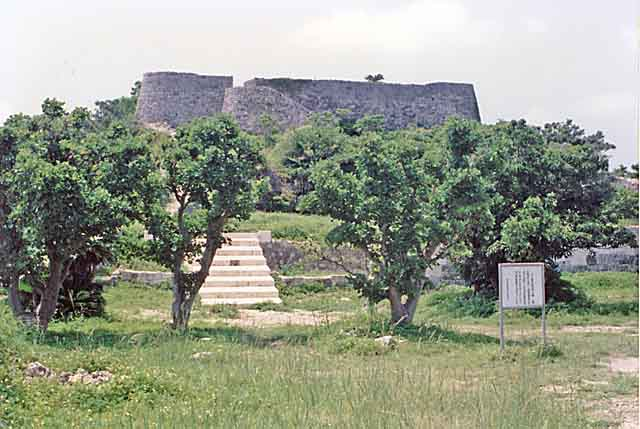
Katsuren Castle on the Katsuren Peninsula

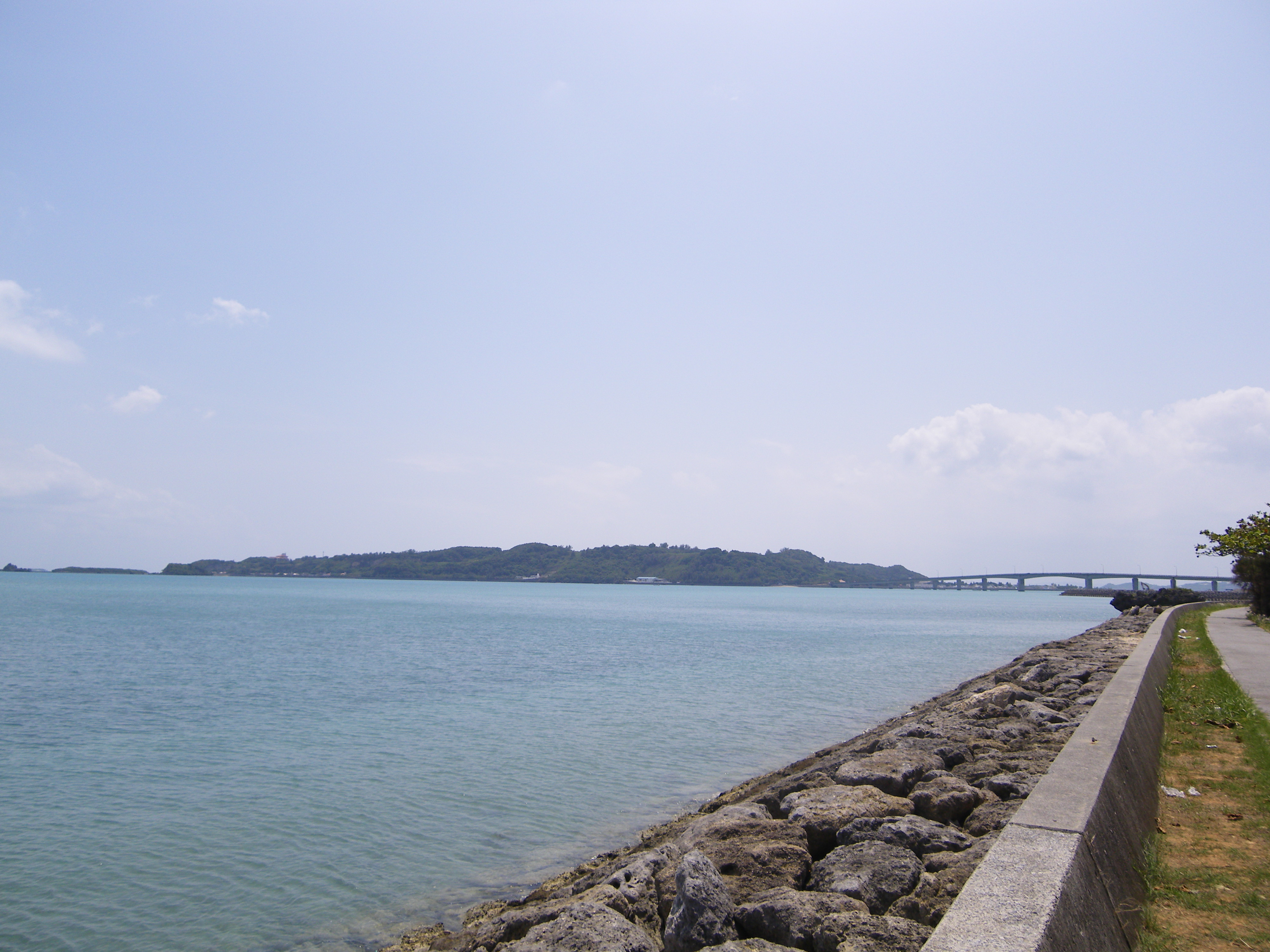
Hamahiga Island

== See also ==
- Seven Mile Bridge
- Overseas Highway
