= Katsuren Peninsula =

Peninsula in Okinawa

Coordinates: 26.32°N 127.90°E

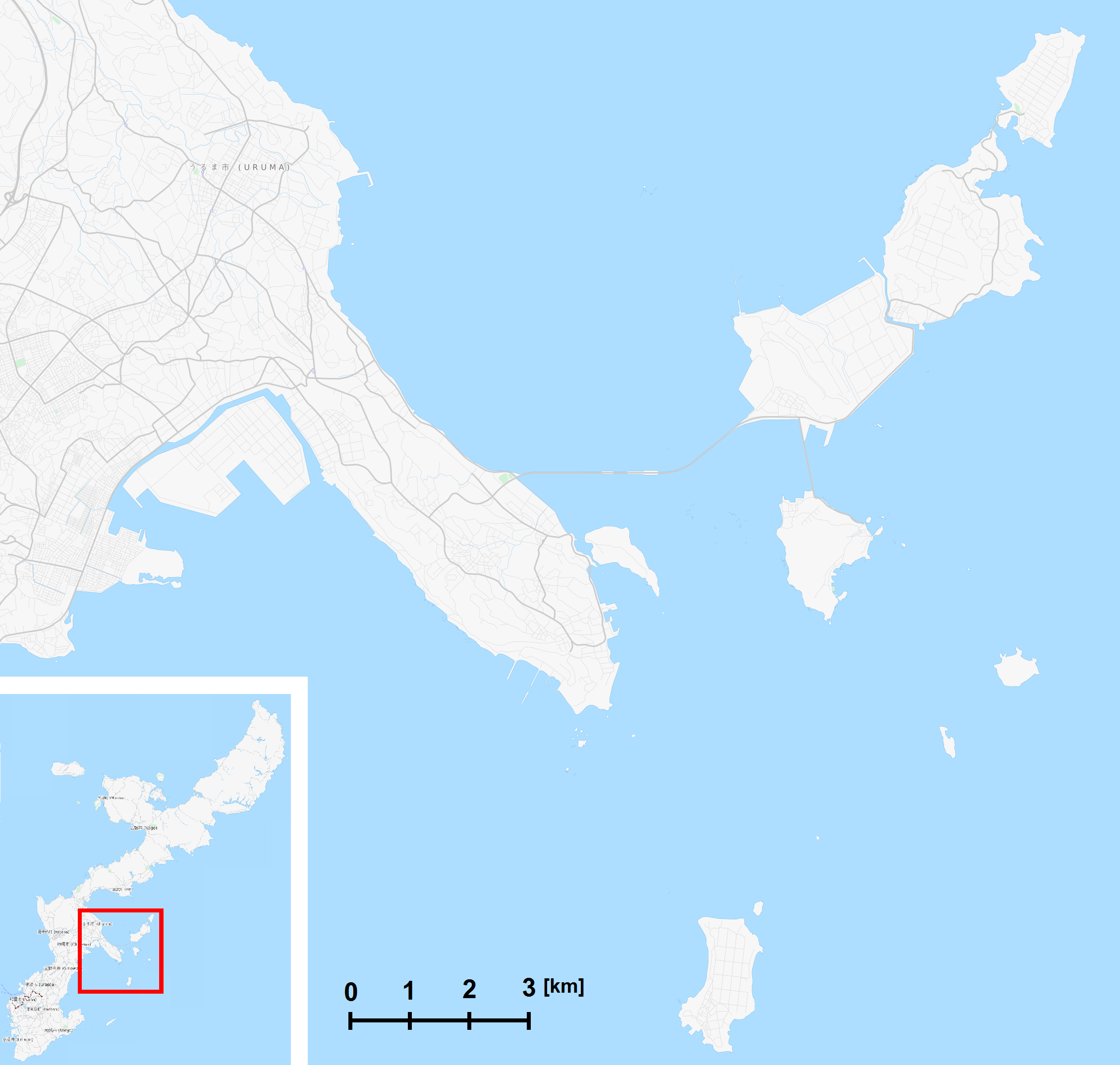
Katsuren Peninsula and the Yokatsu Islands

The Katsuren Peninsula (勝連半島, Katsuren hantō; Okinawan: Kacchin) is a peninsula on Okinawa Island. It is bordered by Nakagusuku Bay to the south, Kin Bay to the north, and the Pacific Ocean to the east. The entire peninsula is part of Uruma City. Katsuren Castle is on the south-central part of the peninsula. The Kaichū Dōro is a road connecting the Katsuren Peninsula to Henza Island. Offshore, coral reefs are found.

== United States military relating to the Katsuren Peninsula ==
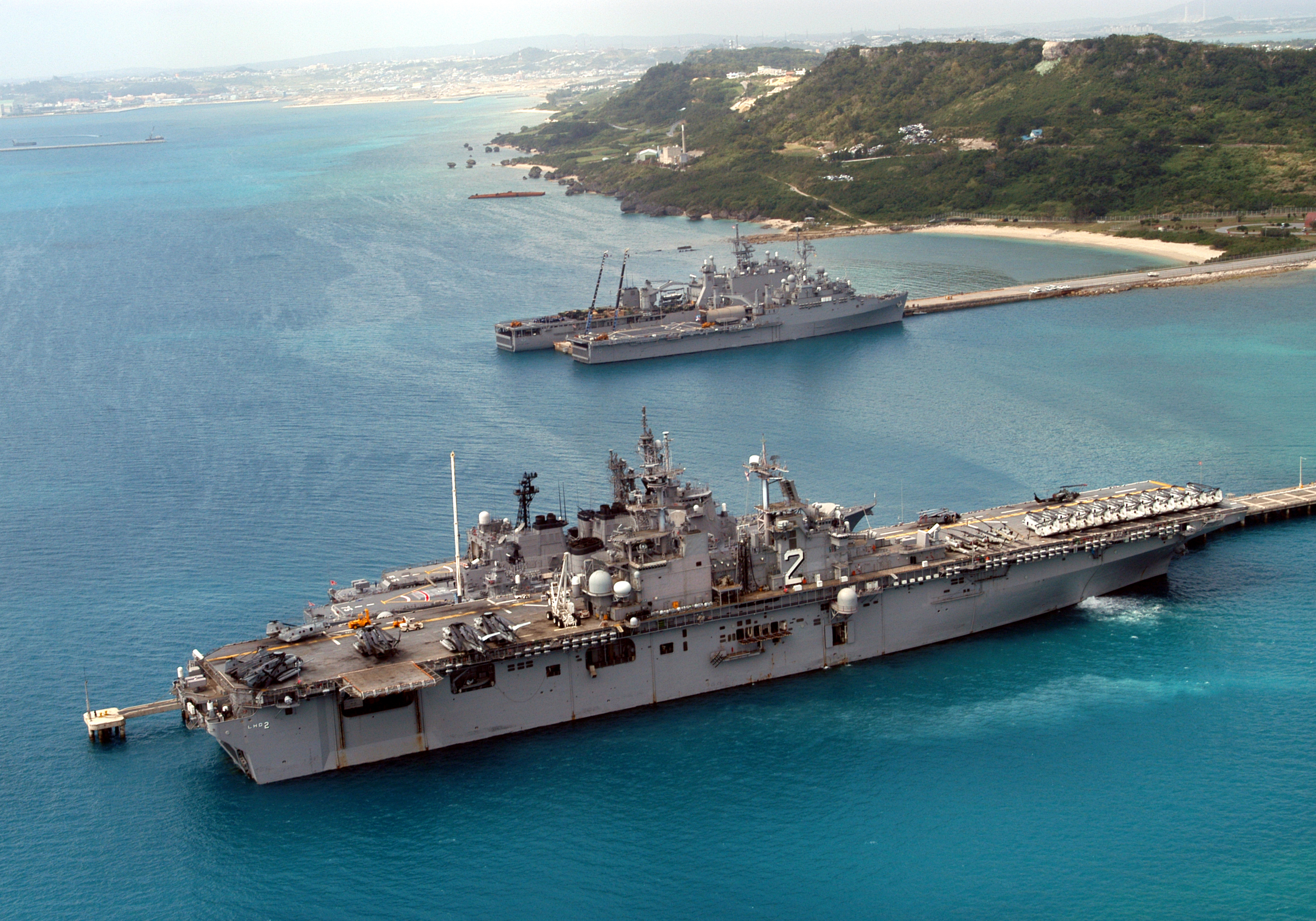
White Beach Naval Port

Buckner Bay - White Beach Naval Port Facility is located on the Katsuren Peninsula. There once was a plan, the "White Beach Plan," to relocate United States Marine Corps Air Station Futenma to the White Beach Training Area. However, it was not effected.

== Nearby islands ==
- The eight Yokatsu Islands, which include:
- Ikei Island
- Hamahiga Island
- Henza Island
- Minamiukibara Island
- Miyagi Island
- Tsuken Island
- Ukibara Island
- Yabuchi Island

== Other peninsulas on Okinawa ==
- Chinen Peninsula
- Henoko Peninsula
- Motobu Peninsula
- Yomitan peninsula

== See also ==
- Chinen Cape
- Yakena Straits Observatory

== External links and references ==
- A google map
- One link
- A second link
- On the Yakena Straits Observatory
- A shot of the Waitui Cut
- Noroga and Remnants of an Old Sugar Factory, on Katsuren Peninsula
- One Youtube, exploring the Katsuren Peninsula
- Island-hopping in the Katsuren Peninsula
- Searching for Waitui on the Katsuren Peninsula
- An article on the geology of Kasturen Peninsula
- More geology
