= Okinawa Islands =

Archipelago within the Ryukyu Islands

Coordinates: 26°19′58″N 127°44′56″E

Native name: Okinawa Shotō (沖縄諸島)
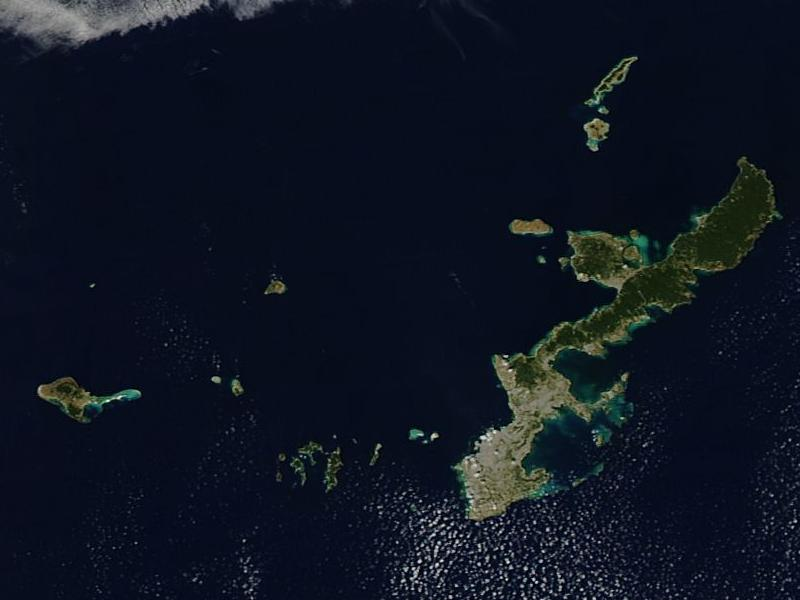
- Okinawa Islands

- Location within Japan

Geography
- Location: Pacific Ocean
- Archipelago: Ryukyu Islands
- Adjacent to: East China Sea
- Total islands: 113
- Major islands: Okinawa Island, Kume Island, Kerama Islands
- Area: 1,418.59 km^{2} (547.72 sq mi)

Administration
- Japan
- Prefecture: Okinawa Prefecture
- Largest settlement: Naha (pop. 312,393)

Demographics
- Population: 1,285,003 (October 1, 2010)
- Pop. density: 908.8/km^{2} (2353.8/sq mi)
- Ethnic groups: Ryukyuan, Japanese

The Okinawa Islands (Japanese: 沖縄諸島 / 沖縄群島, Hepburn: Okinawa Shotō / Okinawa Guntō) are an island group in Okinawa Prefecture, Japan, and are the principal island group of the prefecture. The Okinawa Islands are part of the larger Ryukyu Islands group and are located between the Amami Islands of Kagoshima Prefecture to the northeast and the Sakishima Islands of Okinawa Prefecture to the southwest.

The Okinawa Islands, apart from the main island, contain three smaller island groups: the Kerama, Yokatsu and Iheya-Izena island groups.

The Okinawa Islands are the political, cultural and population center of Okinawa Prefecture. The prefectural capital of Naha is within the island group. 90% of the population of the prefecture reside within the Okinawa Islands, primarily on the largest island of the group, Okinawa Island. Access to the various Okinawa Islands is primarily via small airports which connect to Naha Airport. Additionally, the islands are connected via ferry service to the Port of Naha in the prefectural capital.

The Okinawa Islands are within the subtropical climate zone, which supports the production of sugarcane, pineapples and cut flowers. The military bases of the United States in Okinawa Prefecture are located on the Okinawa Islands.

Historically, the rule of the Ryukyu Kingdom, centered on Okinawa Island, consolidated the Okinawa Islands before spreading south to the Miyako and Yaeyama Islands and north to Amami Ōshima.

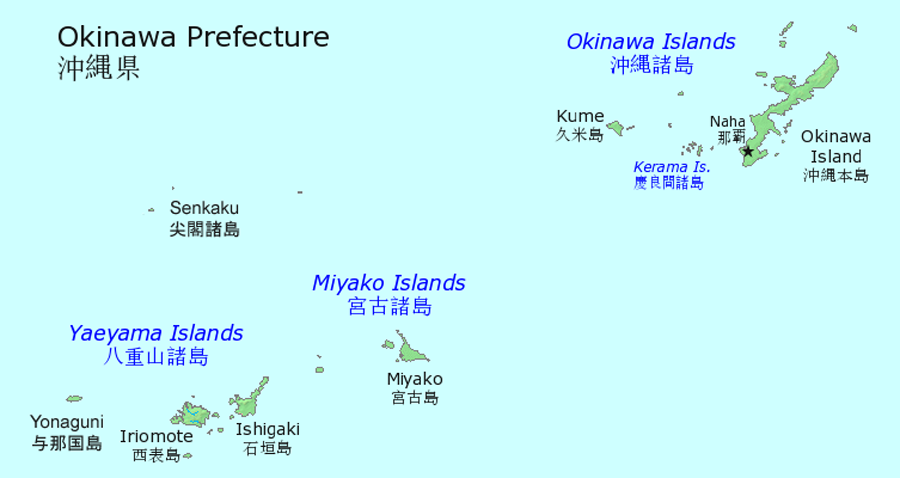
Location of the Okinawa Islands in Okinawa Prefecture

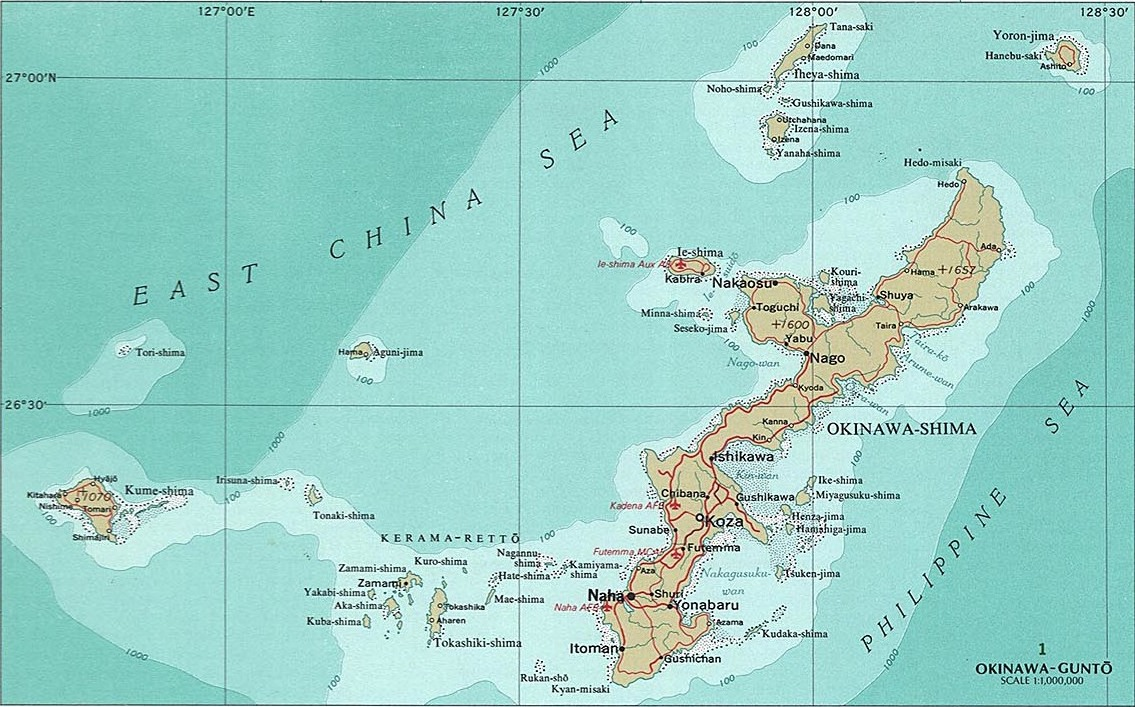
Map of the Okinawa Islands

== Islands ==
The Okinawa Guntō, defined by the Hydrographic and Oceanographic Department of the Japan Coast Guard, cover the following islands:

- Okinawa Island (Okinawa Hontō)
- Iheya-Izena Islands: Iheya Island, Izena Island, Noho Island
- Ie Island
- Sesoko Island
- Yokatsu Islands: Yabuchi Island, Henza Island, Miyagi Island, Ikei Island, Hamahiga Island, Tsuken Island, Ukibaru Island, Minamiukibaru Island, Kudaka Island
- Kume Island
- Kerama Islands: Tokashiki Island, Zamami Island, Aka Island, Geruma Island, Keise Islands (Kamiyama Island, Kuefu Island, Nagannu Island)
- Aguni Islands: Aguni Island, Tonaki Island

The Geospatial Information Authority of Japan (GSI) defines the Okinawa Shotō. They are an administratively-oriented group of islands and include the outlying Iōtorishima, which is otherwise seen as part of the Amami Islands.

== See also ==
- Names of Okinawa
