= Iheya, Okinawa =

Village in Okinawa Prefecture, Japan

Iheya 伊平屋村 Ihyaa
- Village
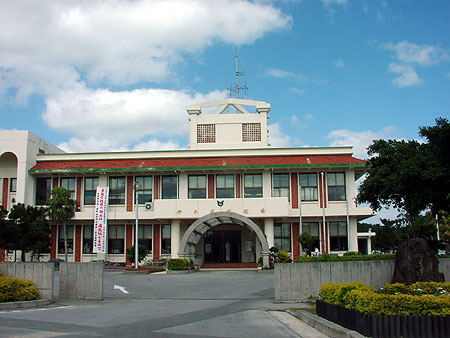
- Iheya village office

- Flag Emblem

- Location of Iheya in Okinawa Prefecture

- Location in Japan
- Coordinates: 27°2′21″N 127°58′7″E
- Country: Japan
- Region: Kyushu (Okinawa)
- Prefecture: Okinawa Prefecture
- District: Shimajiri

Area
  - Total: 21.72 km^{2} (8.39 sq mi)

Population (October 1, 2016)
  - Total: 1,214
  - Density: 55.89/km^{2} (144.8/sq mi)
- Time zone: UTC+09:00 (JST)
- Website: www.vill.iheya.okinawa.jp

Iheya (伊平屋村, Iheya-son; Okinawan: Ihyaa, also known as Kushijii (後地)) is a village located in Shimajiri District, Okinawa Prefecture, Japan. It encompasses the island of Iheya.

As of October 2016, the village has an estimated population of 1,214 and the density of 56 persons per km^{2}. The total area is 21.72 km^{2}.

== Geography ==
Iheya Village includes the islands of Iheya and Noho, that are linked together through the Noho-Ōhashi Bridge. Most of the land is covered with forests and a part is registered as “agriculture promotion area” (農業振興地域).

Iheya Village has an area of 2172ha (21.72 km^{2}), the land use survey of 2006 showed that 1146 ha (52.8%) were mountain forests, 285 ha (13.1%) were agricultural dry fields, 206 ha (9.5%) were moorlands, 123 ha (5.7%) were paddy fields, 37 ha (1.7%) were residential and 25 ha (1.2%) consisted in protective woods.

Iheya has given its name to a few species, including Iheyahigekusa grass (Schoenus calostachyus), Iheyayamatakamaimai snail (Satsuma iheyaensis) or Iheyatokagemodoki lizard (Goniurosaurus toyamai).

=== Administrative divisions ===
The village includes five wards.

- Dana (田名)
- Gakiya (我喜屋)
- Maedomari (前泊)
- Noho (野甫)
- Shimajiri (島尻)

Dana, Maedomari, Gakiya and Shimajiri are on Iheya Island and Noho on Noho Island. Dana is sheltered on three sides by mountains, but Maedomari, Gakiya and Shimajiri are on alluvial deposits along the coast.

=== Climate ===
Ihaya Village is located in the subtropical zone. The dominant wind blows south-south-west, with a change for a north-north-west wind from autumn to winter. The annual mean precipitations are relatively high, around 2000 mm but vary highly by seasons. Agricultural products may be damaged by typhoons or by droughts in summer and autumn.

== Education ==
- Iheya Junior High School (伊平屋中学校)
- Iheya Elementary School (伊平屋小学校)

Okinawa Prefectural Board of Education operates high schools elsewhere in the prefecture.

== Cultural Properties ==
- Name (Japanese) (Type of registration)

=== Cultural Properties ===
- Iheya Island Lighthouse (伊平屋島灯台)

=== Folk Cultural Properties ===
- Kami-Ashiage sacred site in Gakiya (伊平屋村我喜屋の神あしあげ) (Prefectural)
- Kami-Ashiage sacred site in Shimajiri (伊平屋村島尻の神あしあげ) (Prefectural)

=== Historic Sites ===
- Kusatobaru Shell Mound (久里原貝塚) (Prefectural)
- Yagura-baka tomb (屋蔵墓)

=== Places of scenic beauty ===
- Kumaya Coast (クマヤ海岸)
- Mount Koshi path (腰岳遊歩道)
- Nzōmiji spring (無蔵水) (Municipal)
- Sūgahama Beach (潮下浜)
- Yonesaki Coast (米崎海岸)

=== Natural Monuments ===
- Hiramatsu Pine Tree Pinus luchuensis of Koshi (腰の平松)
- Kumaya Cave (くまや洞窟) (Prefectural)
- Mount Kuba in Dana (田名の久葉山) (Prefectural)
- Nentō Hiramatsu Pine Tree Pinus luchuensis (伊平屋島の念頭平松) (National)
- Ubame oak community Quercus phillyraeoides (伊平屋島のウバメガシ群落) (National)
- Yahe Rock (ヤヘ岩)

== Notable residents ==
On May 25, 1964, Hihei Shiroma of Iheya petitioned the United States House Committee on Foreign Affairs for the return of Okinawa to Japan, alongside Seigen Ukumoto of Nakazato, Okinawa and Heiryo Chibana of Yomitan, Okinawa, 8 years prior to the return of Okinawa to Japanese administrative control in 1972.
