= Aguni Islands =

Group of islands in Okinawa Prefecture, Japan

Coordinates: 35°50′32.08″N 139°48′15.83″E

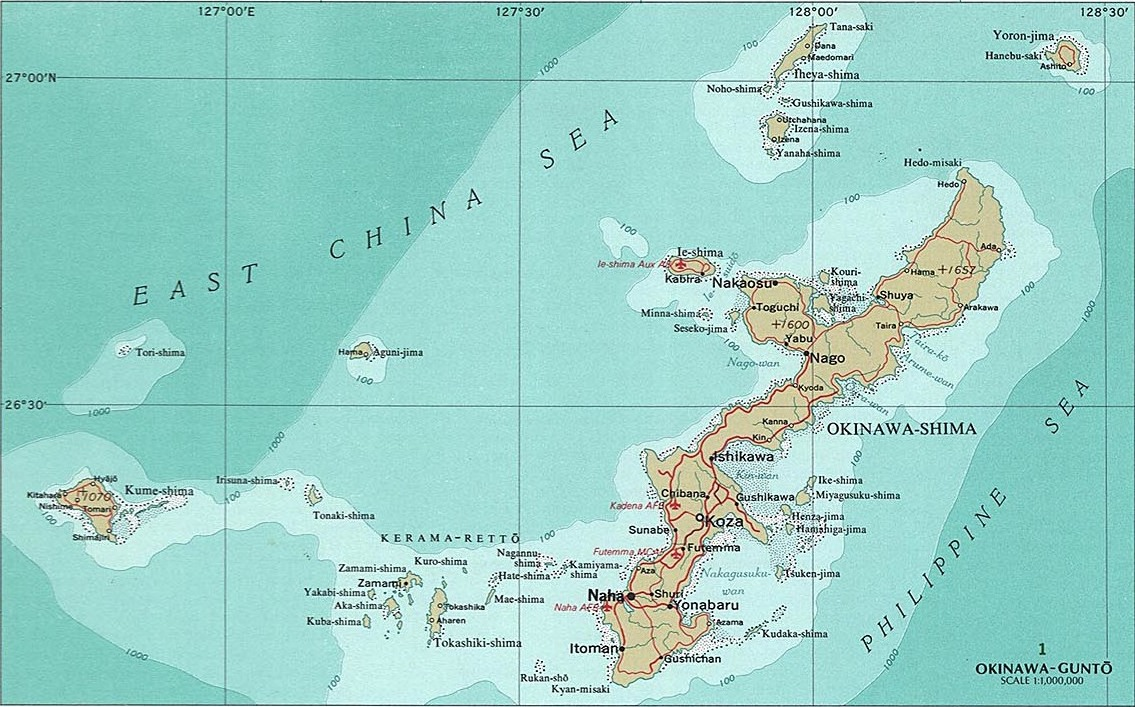
The Aguni Islands are located west of Okinawa Island.

The Aguni Islands (粟国諸島, Aguni Shotō) are a group of islands in Okinawa Prefecture, Japan, located about 60 km west of Okinawa Island.

They include

- Aguni Village (Shimajiri District)
  - Aguni Island (粟国島, Aguni-jima)
- Tonaki, Village (Shimajiri District)
  - Tonaki Island (渡名喜島, Tonaki-jima)
  - Irisuna Island (入砂島, Irisuna-jima)
