= AGJ =

AGJ may refer to:

- Alfred Garth Jones (1872–1955), English artist and illustrator
- Argobba language (ISO-639-3 code agj)
- Attorney General of Jamaica
- Aguni Airport in Okinawa Prefecture, Japan (IATA airport code AGJ)
