= Aguni, Okinawa =

Village on Aguni Island in Okinawa, Japan

Aguni 粟国村
- Village
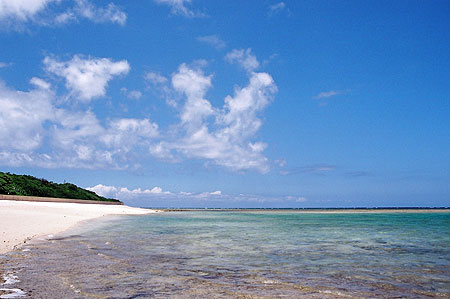
- Nagahama Beach

- Flag Emblem

- Location of Aguni in Okinawa Prefecture

- Location in Japan
- Coordinates: 26°34′57″N 127°13′38″E
- Country: Japan
- Region: Kyushu (Okinawa)
- Prefecture: Okinawa Prefecture
- District: Shimajiri

Government
  - Mayor: Kazuhiro Uehara
  - Vice Mayor: Yoshiyuki Yamashiro

Area
  - Total: 7.65 km^{2} (2.95 sq mi)
- Elevation: 97.3 m (319 ft)

Population (March 1, 2022)
  - Total: 672
  - Density: 87.8/km^{2} (228/sq mi)
- Time zone: UTC+09:00 (JST)
- City hall address: 367 Higashi, Aguni, Okinawa-ken
- Climate: Cfa
- Website: www.vill.aguni.okinawa.jp(in Japanese)
- Symbols
- Flower: Easter Lily (Lilium longiflorum)
- Tree: Fukugi (Garcinia)

Aguni (粟国村, Aguni-son) is a village located in Shimajiri District, Okinawa Prefecture, Japan. The village occupies the entirety of Aguni Island. As of 2022, the village had an estimated population of 672 and a population density of 87.8 persons per km^{2}. The total area is 7.65 square kilometres (2.95 mi^{2}).

== Geography ==
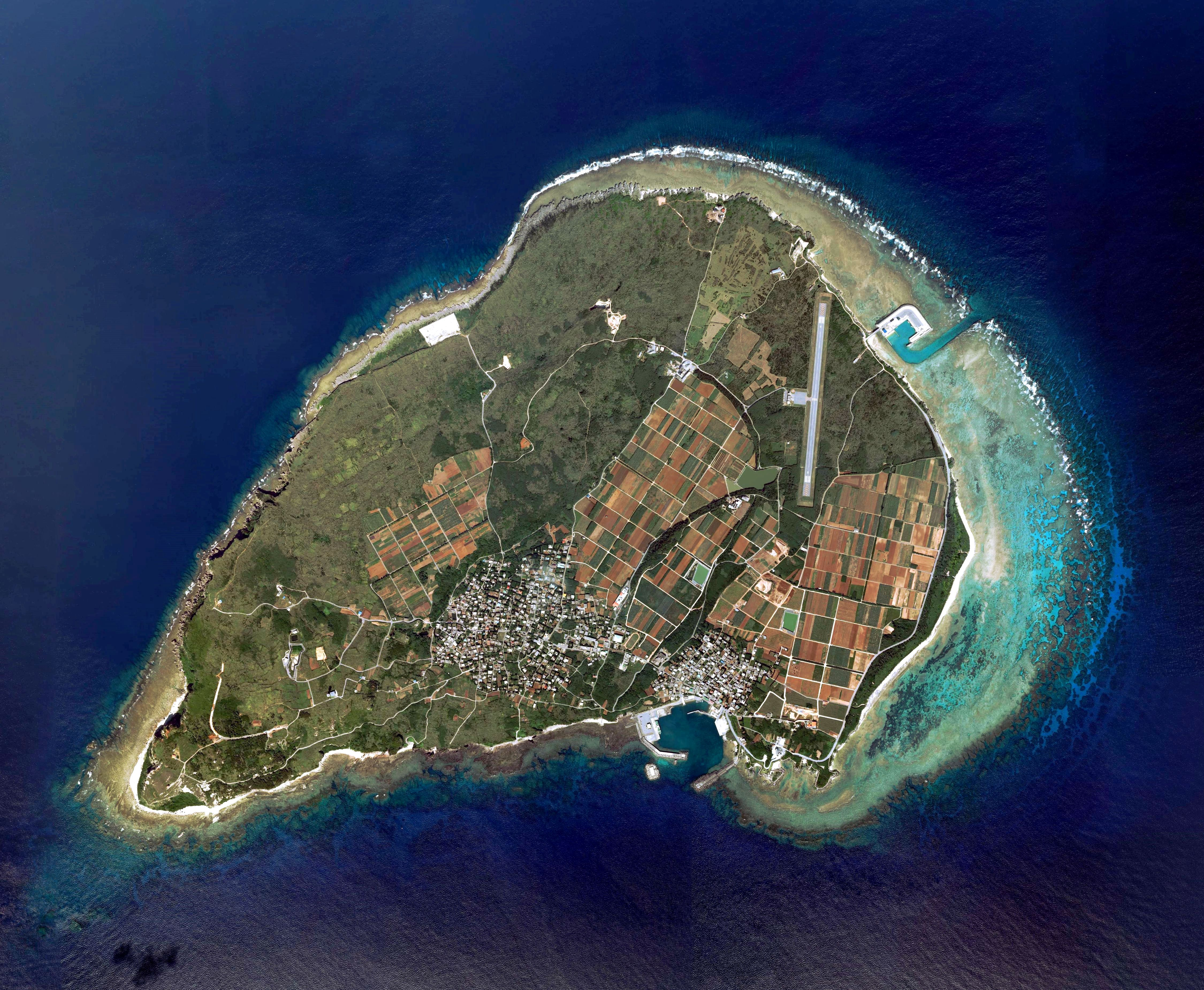
Aerial view of Aguni Island

Aguni is located in the East China Sea. The village sits 60 kilometres (37 mi) northwest of Naha, Okinawa, the prefectural capital of Okinawa on Okinawa Island. Aguni Island spans 3 kilometres (1.9 mi) from north to south and 4 kilometres (2.5 mi) from east to west. Aguni is a low-lying island with its highest point only reaching 97.3 metres (319 ft).

Aguni faces Tonaki and the Kerama Islands to the south and Kume Island to the southwest.

=== Administrative divisions ===
The village includes three divisions.

- Hama (浜)
- Higashi (東)
- Nishi (西)

=== Climate ===
Climate data for Aguni (2003−2020 normals, extremes 2003−present)
Month	Jan	Feb	Mar	Apr	May	Jun	Jul	Aug	Sep	Oct	Nov	Dec	Year
Record high °C (°F)	26.0 (78.8)	26.4 (79.5)	27.0 (80.6)	28.8 (83.8)	30.9 (87.6)	33.7 (92.7)	34.8 (94.6)	35.3 (95.5)	35.0 (95.0)	32.9 (91.2)	29.6 (85.3)	28.2 (82.8)	35.3 (95.5)
Mean daily maximum °C (°F)	19.2 (66.6)	20.1 (68.2)	21.3 (70.3)	23.9 (75.0)	26.5 (79.7)	29.2 (84.6)	31.9 (89.4)	31.8 (89.2)	30.6 (87.1)	27.8 (82.0)	24.7 (76.5)	21.0 (69.8)	25.7 (78.2)
Daily mean °C (°F)	17.0 (62.6)	17.6 (63.7)	18.6 (65.5)	21.2 (70.2)	23.9 (75.0)	26.6 (79.9)	29.0 (84.2)	29.0 (84.2)	28.0 (82.4)	25.5 (77.9)	22.6 (72.7)	18.8 (65.8)	23.2 (73.7)
Mean daily minimum °C (°F)	14.7 (58.5)	15.3 (59.5)	16.2 (61.2)	18.7 (65.7)	21.6 (70.9)	24.7 (76.5)	26.7 (80.1)	26.6 (79.9)	25.7 (78.3)	23.6 (74.5)	20.6 (69.1)	16.7 (62.1)	20.9 (69.7)
Record low °C (°F)	4.9 (40.8)	5.6 (42.1)	6.1 (43.0)	10.3 (50.5)	12.2 (54.0)	17.0 (62.6)	21.9 (71.4)	22.4 (72.3)	18.5 (65.3)	15.7 (60.3)	12.3 (54.1)	7.2 (45.0)	4.9 (40.8)
Average precipitation mm (inches)	98.3 (3.87)	103.5 (4.07)	160.9 (6.33)	154.0 (6.06)	244.0 (9.61)	334.3 (13.16)	131.1 (5.16)	182.0 (7.17)	204.0 (8.03)	116.5 (4.59)	127.0 (5.00)	106.3 (4.19)	1,959.5 (77.15)
Average precipitation days (≥ 1.0 mm)	11.3	10.9	11.3	10.7	12.0	12.7	6.9	9.9	10.6	8.2	8.8	10.1	123.4
Source: JMA

== History ==
Aguni was settled early in the history of the Ryukyu Islands. The island has remains of both shell middens and gusuku castle remains. Aguni appears in the earliest written record as Awaguni, and was placed under the administration of Kume Island. Aguni was home to merchants and mariners in the sailing period of the Ryukyu Kingdom. After the end of the Ryukyu Kingdom, and the abolition of the han system in Japan in 1879, Aguni became part of Okinawa Prefecture. In 1880 the population of Aguni stood at 3,099 residents, and reached 4,966 by 1903. The island saw discontent and violent protest by peasants between 1880 and 1881, which were ultimately suppressed by the authorities on Kume Island. The Village of Aguni was formally established in 1908

Aguni was invaded by the United States as part of the Battle of Okinawa during World War II. The island, along with the Kerama Islands, was overtaken by Allied forces after aerial and naval bombardment on March 23, 1945. Civil administration of the village ended after the American invasion. 30 leaders from the village were appointed to keep order on the island. The mayor of Aguni was reappointed in 1946 by the American administration, and mayoral and village council elections resumed in 1948.

The population of Aguni decreased rapidly after World War II, due to both an aging population and the emigration of residents from the island. The village had 960 residents in 2000, and at present has fallen to 672.

== Government ==
Aguni is administered from the village hall in Higashi Ward.

The municipality of Aguni is administered by a mayor, a vice-mayor and five administrative divisions:

- General Affairs Section
- Citizens' Livelihood Section
- Economic Section
- Accounting Section
- Maritime Affairs Section

The current mayor is Kazuhiro Uehara (上原 一宏) (elected July 2024), the current vice-mayor is Yoshiyuki Yamashiro (山城 義之) (designated September 2024).

The Aguni Village Council consists of seven members elected for four years in 2022. They are currently led by chairperson Yoshiyuki Yonashiro (与那城 義幸) and vice-chairperson Satoshi Kohashigawa (小橋川 聡).

== Transportation ==
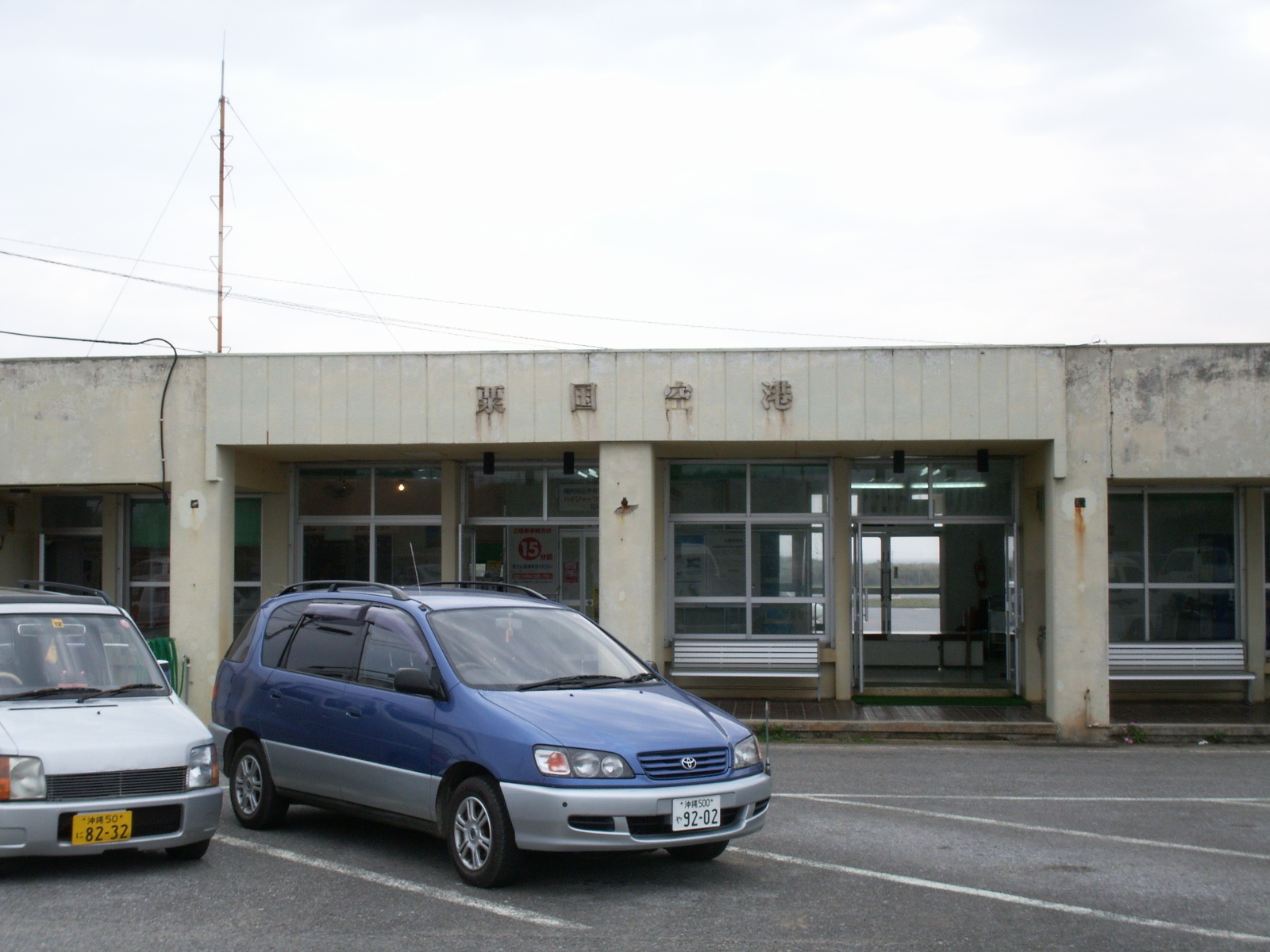
Aguni Airport

=== Air ===
Aguni is connected to Okinawa Island via Aguni Airport. The airport was constructed in 1978 after the reversion of Okinawa Prefecture to Japan. Aguni can be reached from Naha in only 20 minutes.

=== Ferry ===
Aguni is connected to the main island of Okinawa by ferry between the Port of Aguni and the Port of Tomari in Naha. The Port of Aguni came under the administration of Okinawa Prefecture in 1972 after the reversion of the prefecture to Japan. Ferry service between Aguni and Naha takes approximately two hours.

== Education ==
Aguni Kindergarten, Elementary, and Junior High School

== Cultural and natural assets ==
Aguni Village hosts five designated or registered tangible cultural properties and monuments, at the prefectural or municipal level.

- Name (Japanese) (Type of registration)

=== Places of scenic beauty ===
- Scenic Spot of Ban'yabaru (番屋原の広場の景勝地) (Municipal)
- Scenic Spot of Sakakinabaru Coast (坂木那原海岸景勝地) (Municipal)

=== Natural Monuments ===
- Ugan Praying Site Plant Community of Nishi (粟国村字西の御願の植物群落) (Prefectural)
- Tree heliotrope (Heliotropium arboreum) Plant Community of Terukinabaru (照喜名原のモンパの木の群落) (Municipal)
- Itajii tree of Matsuo Utaki Sacred Site (松尾御獄のイタジイの木) (Municipal)
