= Nakabaru Ruins =

Archaeological site in Okinawa, Japan

- 仲原遺跡 (Japanese)
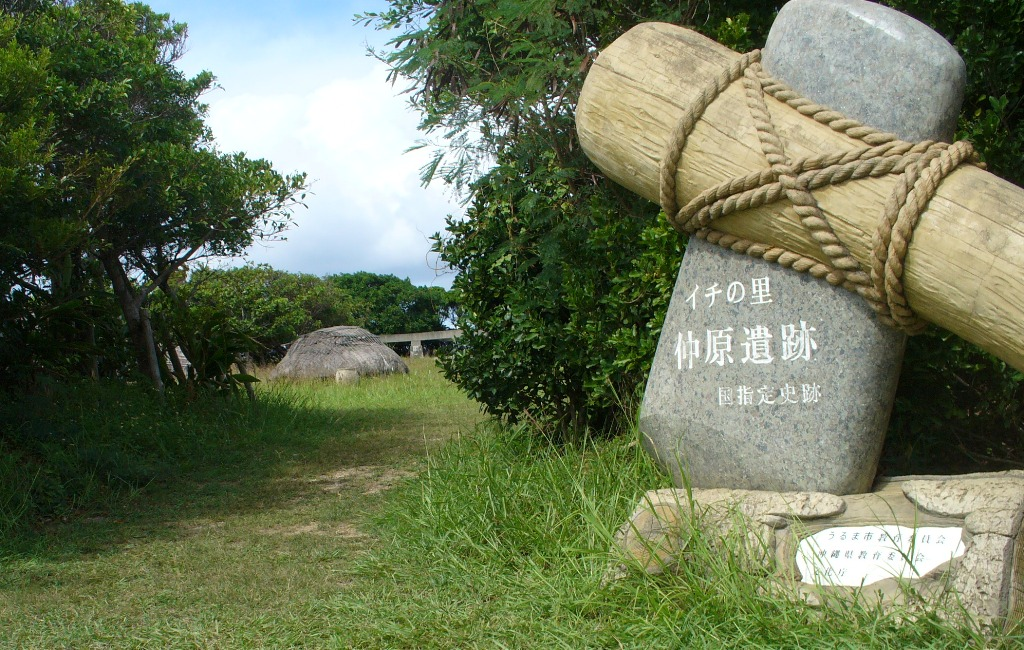
- Entry to the Nakabaru Ruins

- Nakabaru Ruins Nakabaru Ruins (Japan)
- Interactive map of Nakabaru Ruins
- 26°23′29.5″N 127°59′40.5″E
- Type: settlement trace
- Periods: Shellmidden
- Location: Uruma, Okinawa, Japan
- Region: Okinawa

Site notes
- Public access: Yes (no facilities at site)

The Nakabaru Ruins (Japanese: 仲原遺跡, Hepburn: Nakabaru iseki) are an archaeological site with traces of a mid-Okinawan Shellmidden Period (2000–2500 years ago) settlement located on the island of Ikei Island in the city of Uruma, Okinawa Prefecture, Japan. It was designated a National Historic Site in 1986.

== Overview ==
The Nakabaru Ruins is located on a low, flat limestone plateau at an altitude of approximately 23 meters, in a field of red soil formed by the weathering of the limestone, near the center of Ikeijima island. It was discovered in 1978 during a land improvement project in an area that had been a sugarcane field. The site spans an area of approximately 200 meters east-west and 100 meters north-south. Pit dwellings, primarily of a rounded-corner rectangular shape, using Ryūkyū limestone as walls. have been identified. Twenty-three building remains have been discovered, including large ones with a diameter of five to six meters and smaller ones of two to three meters. The smaller buildings are arranged around the larger buildings, which are believed to be the main houses. Archaeological excavations within the dwelling remains have yielded buried human bones, double-edged polished stone axes, grinding stones, bone awls, shell pendants, shark tooth artifacts, and pottery. The pottery belongs to the final stage of the middle period of the Okinawan Shell Mound Period and has been given the name "Nakahara style." There are deep bowl-shaped and jar-shaped vessels. The former has an everted rim, a constricted neck, a bulging body, and a pointed base. Many are undecorated, and some have external lugs. The latter are long-necked vessels with a spherical or egg-shaped body and a rounded base.

The site has been developed as a tourist attraction with reconstructions of buildings.

== See also ==
- List of Historic Sites of Japan (Okinawa)
