= Noho Island =

Island in Okinawa, Japan

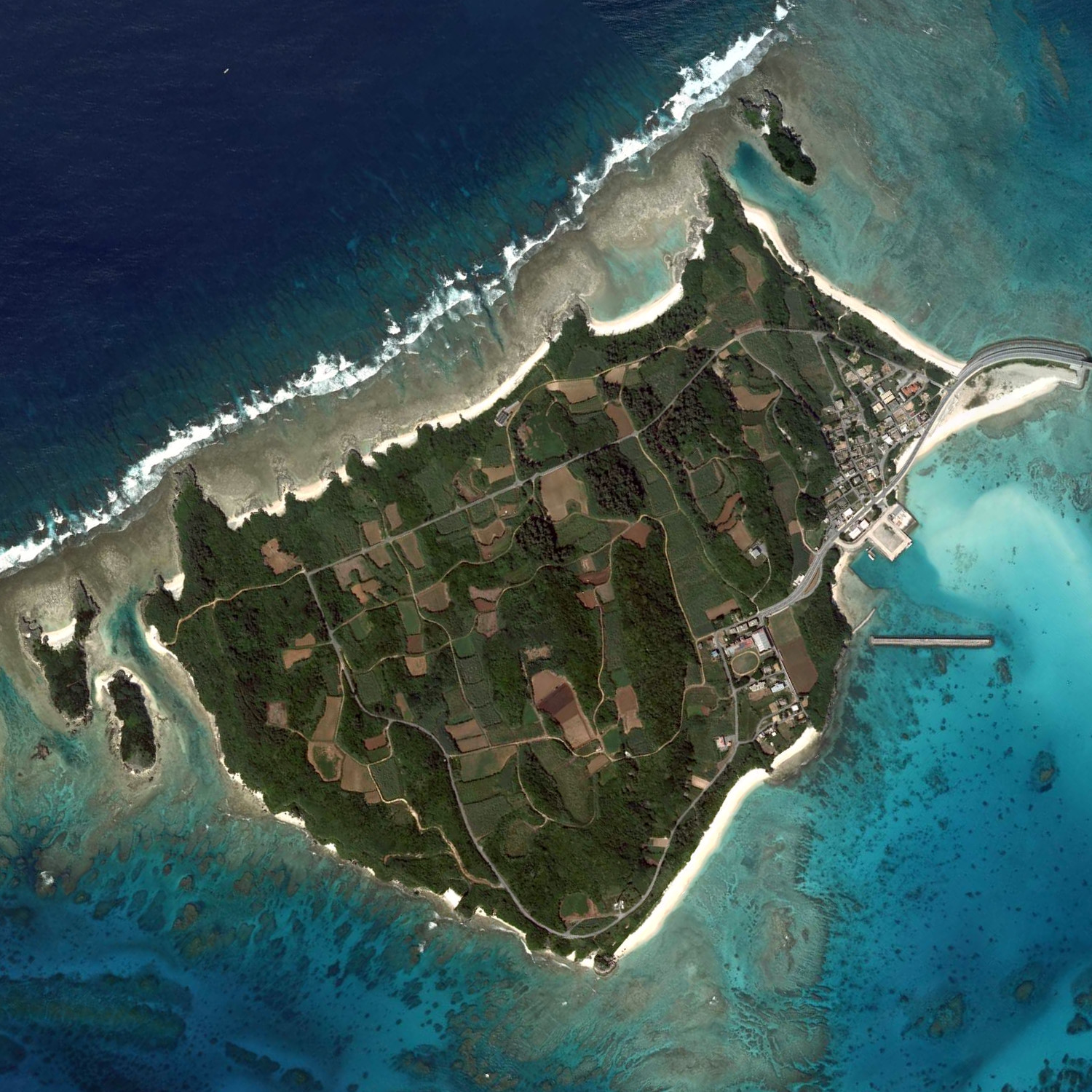
- Aerial view of Noho Island
- Interactive map of Noho Island

Geography
- Coordinates: 26°59′41″N 127°55′13″E
- Area: 1.08 km^{2} (0.42 sq mi)

Administration
- Japan
- Prefecture: Okinawa Prefecture

Noho Island (Japanese: 野甫島, Hepburn: Noho-jima; Okinawan: Nubu) is a Japanese island in the Okinawa Islands with a population of approximately 140 people. It is connected via bridge with Iheya, Okinawa. The island has expansive field of sugarcane but is a fishing village.

The island has been noted for its Noho Salt Museum (倶楽部 野甫の塩, Kurabu noho no shio), a museum devoted to salt.
