= Ou Island (Nanjō) =

Islet in the Okinawa Islands, Japan

Ōjima
Native name: 奥武島
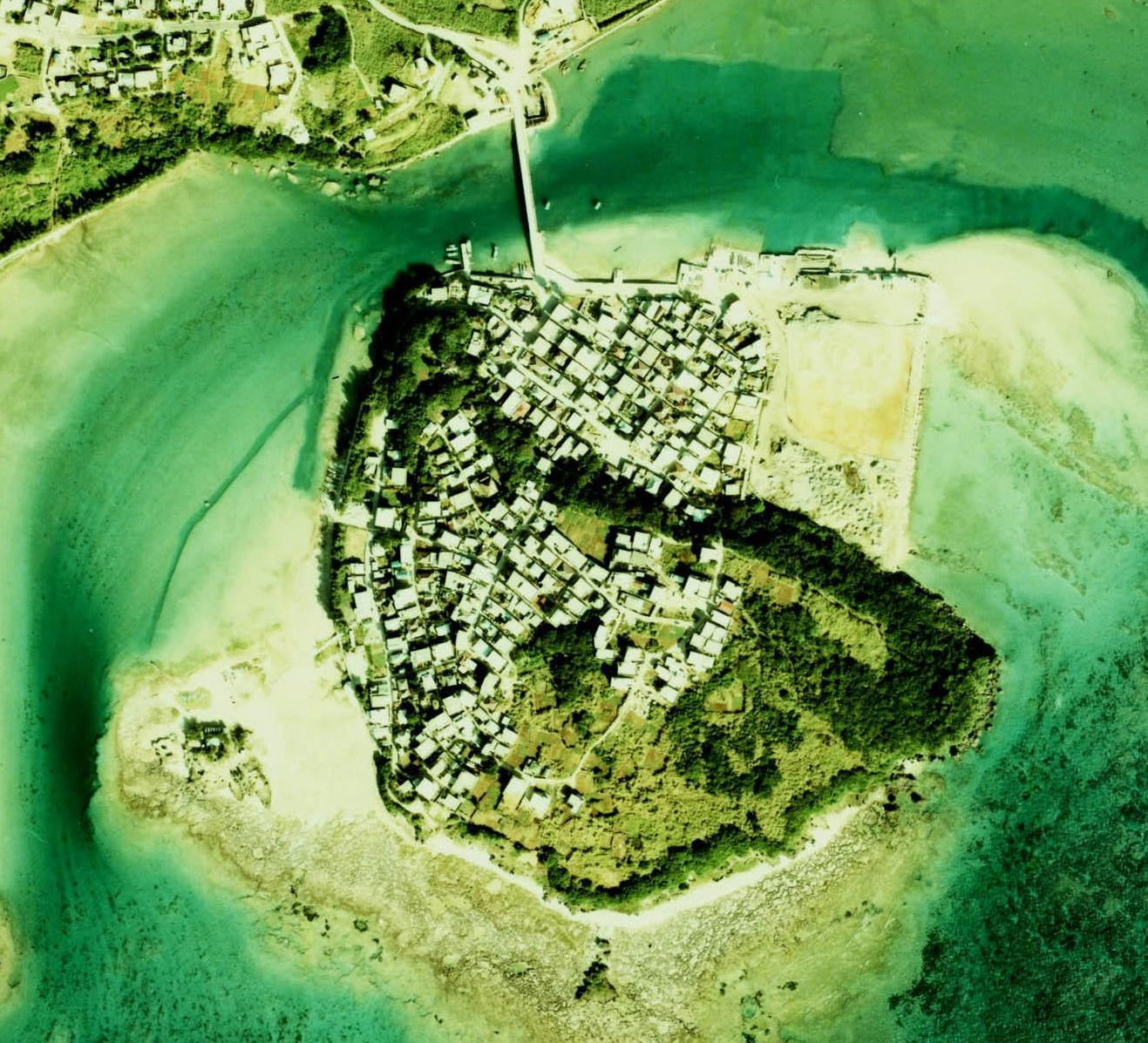
- Aerial view of Ōjima

Geography
- Coordinates: 26°07′47″N 127°46′24″E
- Archipelago: Ryukyu Islands
- Area: 0.23 km^{2} (0.089 sq mi)

Administration
- Japan
- Okinawa Prefecture
- Nanjō City

Ou Island (奥武島, Ōjima) is a small islet located in the Okinawa Islands of Japan. It's administered by the town of Nanjō, and a bridge connects both entities.

The island is known for its abundance of seafood due to Ōjima being a fishing village. The Hari, a dragon boat racing festival, is performed there.
