= Keise Islands =

Island group within the Okinawa Islands

Chibishi Islands
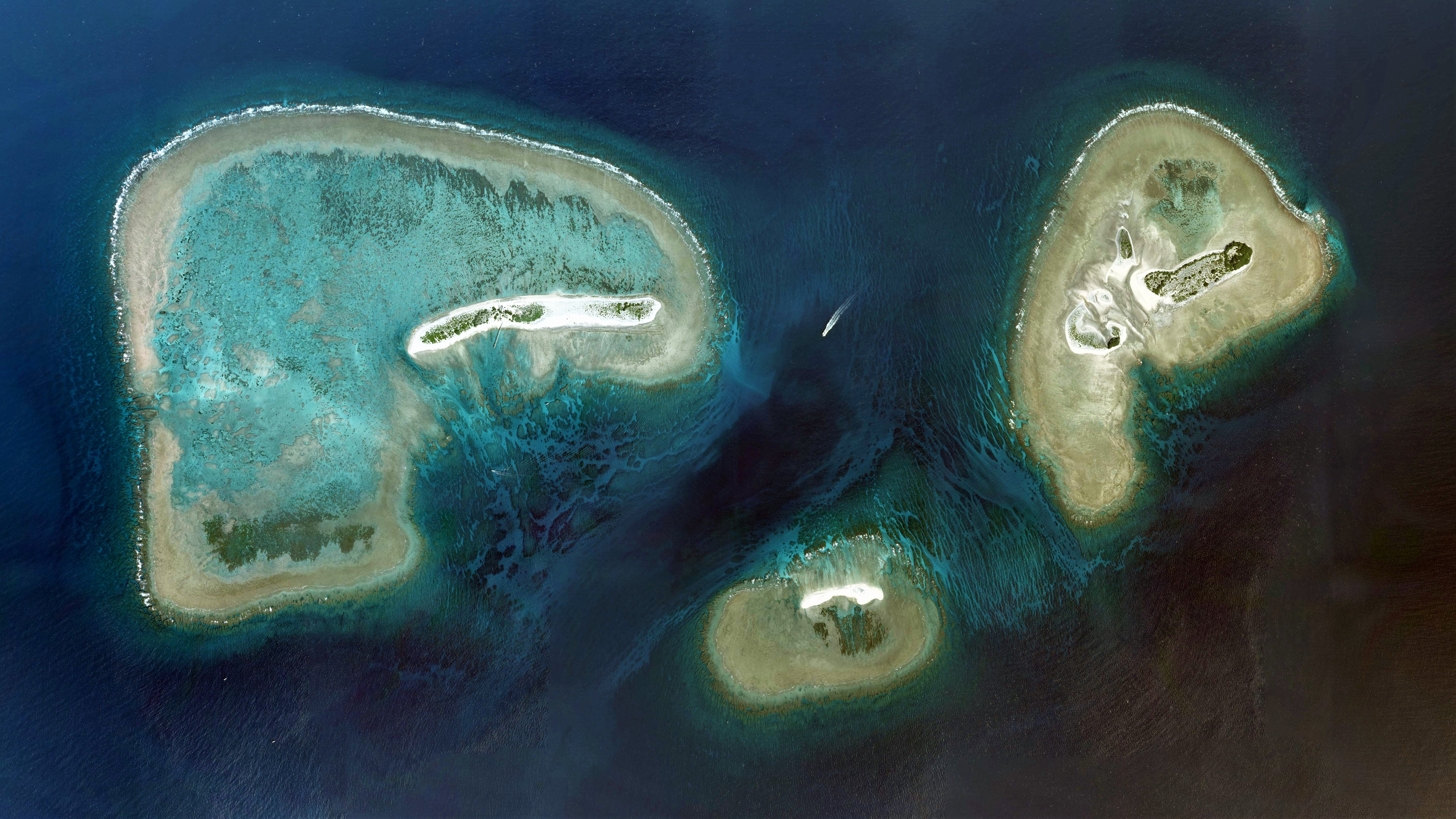
- GSI aerial photograph of the Keise Islands in 2008

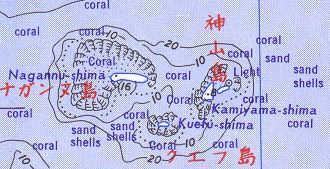
- Topographic map of the Keise Islands

Geography
- Coordinates: 26°15′34″N 127°33′53″E
- Archipelago: Ryukyu Islands; Okinawa Islands; Kerama Islands
- Adjacent to: East China Sea
- Total islands: 3

Administration
- Japan
- Prefecture: Okinawa
- District: Shimajiri
- Village: Tokashiki

The Keise Islands (Japanese: 慶伊瀬島, Hepburn: Keisejima), also known as the Chibishi Islands (Okinawan: チービシ諸島) or Chibishi Atolls (Okinawan: チービシ環礁), are a group of three coral islands within the Okinawa Islands, 8 kilometers (5 miles) from the archipelago's main island. They constitute the eastern end of the Kerama Islands, a subgroup of the Okinawa Islands. As with the rest of the Kerama Islands, the Keise Islands are administered by the village of Tokashiki in Shimajiri District, Okinawa Prefecture, Japan. The islands are a popular day-trip site for tourists, particularly divers.

The Keise Islands were an important artillery site for the United States during the 1945 Battle of Okinawa in the final months of World War II. US forces captured and occupied the islands until 1972, when all of Okinawa Prefecture was returned to Japan.

== Geography ==
The Keise Islands, from largest to smallest, are Kamiyama Island (神山島), Nagannu Island (ナガンヌ島), and Kuefu Island (クエフ島). They are the easternmost of the Kerama Islands and lie just 8 kilometers (5 miles) west of Okinawa Island. Administratively, they are part of the village of Tokashiki in Shimajiri District, Okinawa Prefecture, Japan.

Kamiyama Island is sometimes considered two islands because a tidal island is formed during high tide. It has a fully-automatic lighthouse that was first lit in 1972. The lamp is solar-powered and uses a 390 candela, bright LED light, visible from up to 7.5 nautical miles (13.9 kilometres; 8.6 miles). Remnants of materiel used in the Battle of Okinawa remain on the island.

Nagannu Island (also Nangandu), its name meaning "long" in Okinawan, is an elongated, boomerang-shaped island; Kuefu Island resembles its smaller counterpart.

Keise Islands
Name	Area (km^{2})	Elevation (m)	Coordinates
Kamiyama Island (神山島)	0.29	11	26°15′42″N 127°34′45″E
Nagannu Island (ナガンヌ島)	0.29	8	26°15′57″N 127°32′51″E
Kuefu Island (クエフ島)	0.02	2	26°15′1″N 127°33′39″E

== History ==
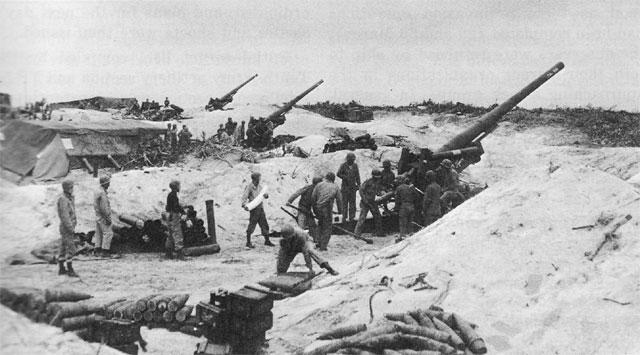
155 mm guns ('Long Toms') set up on Kamiyama Island during the 1945 Battle of Okinawa to support the landing of the Tenth United States Army on Okinawa Island

Historically, the Keise Islands were uninhabited and fishermen set up temporary dwellings only during the fishing season. During the 1945 Battle of Okinawa in the final months of World War II, the United States set up artillery guns on Kamiyama Island to support amphibious landings on Okinawa Island. US forces captured the islands on March 31, 1945, and occupied them until Okinawa Prefecture was returned to Japan on May 15, 1972.

== Fauna ==
The Keise Islands are a protected area for the common tern.

== Tourism and transport ==
Nagannu Island and Kuefu Island have resort facilities and are popular day-trip destinations for tourists, particularly divers. In contrast, Kamiyama Island has not been developed and most of the natural greenery remains untouched; it is thus the least popular of the Keise Islands among tourists. Accordingly, there are ferries from Naha to Nagannu Island and Kuefu Island, but Kamiyama Island can only be reached by charter boat.
