= Minamiukibaru Island =

Island in Japan

Native name: 南浮原島
- Location within Japan

Geography
- Location: Japan
- Coordinates: 26°17′22″N 127°58′49″E
- Archipelago: Yokatsu Islands (Ryukyu Islands)
- Highest elevation: 8 m (26 ft)

Administration
- Japan
- Prefecture: Okinawa
- City: Uruma

Demographics
- Population: 0 (uninhabited)

Minamiukibaru Island (南浮原島, Minamiukibaru-jima), also known as Miukiharu Island, is an islet in the Yokatsu Islands of Okinawa Prefecture, Japan.

It is located southeast of Hamahiga-jima and southwest of Ukibaru-jima.
