= Aguni Island =

Island within Ryukyu Islands

Native name: Aguni (粟国島)
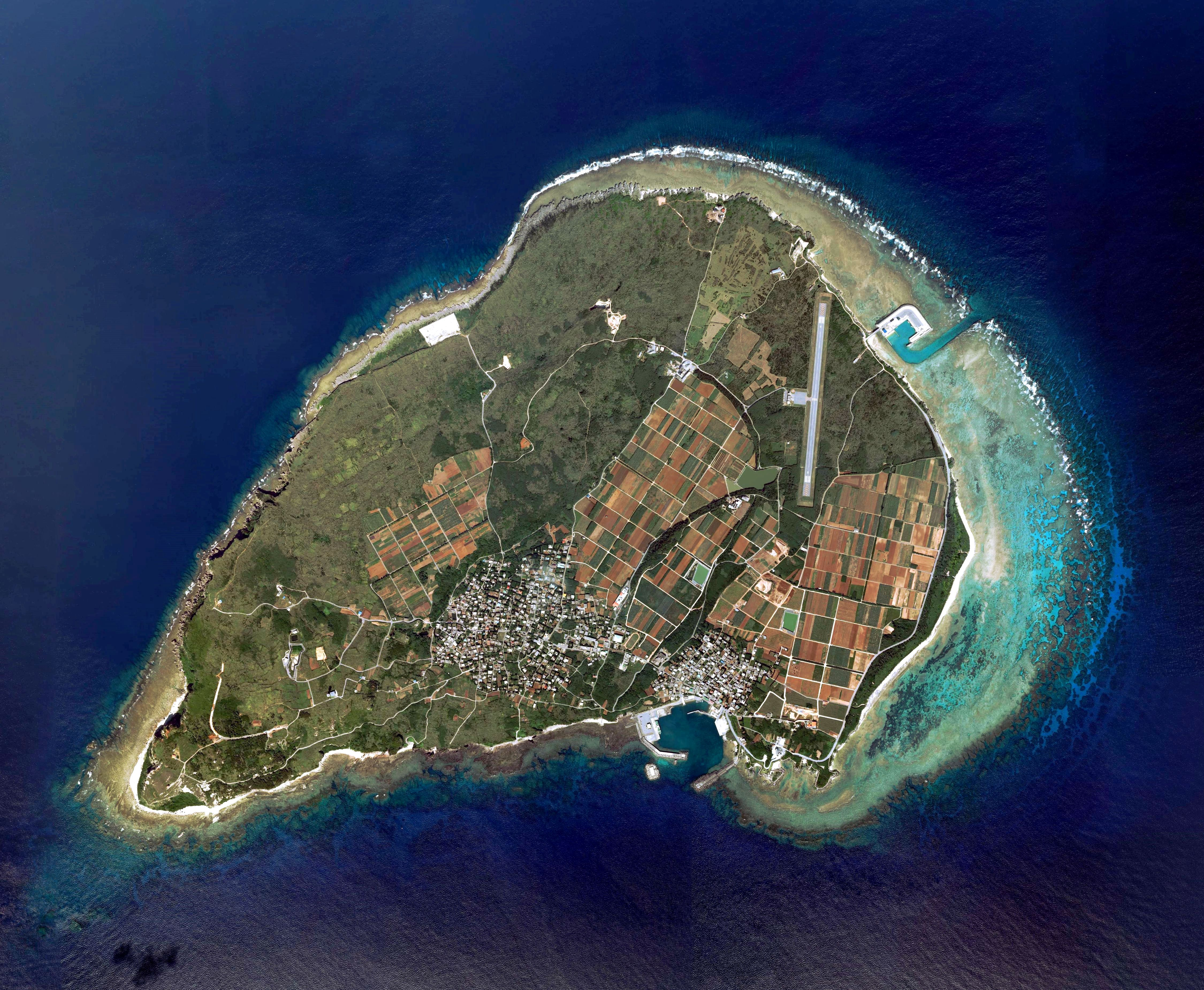
- Aguni Island

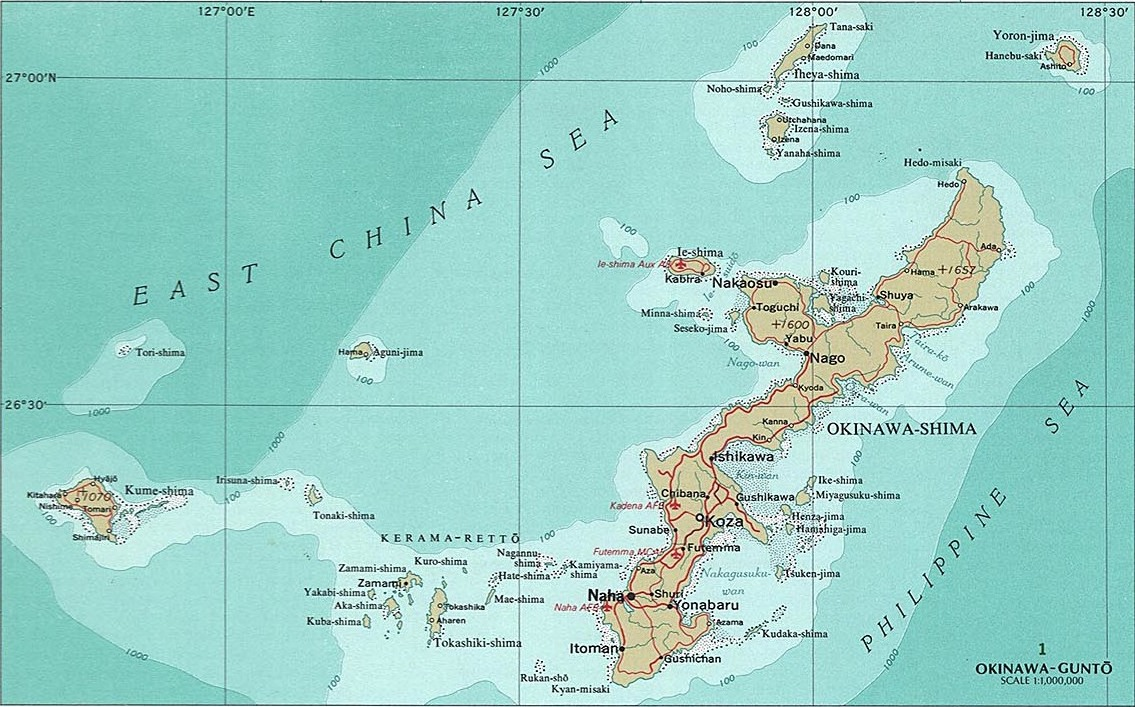
- Aguni Island (labelled Aguni-jima) is to the west of Okinawa Island

Geography
- Location: Pacific Ocean
- Coordinates: 26.58077°N 127.23532°E
- Archipelago: Aguni Islands
- Area: 7.64 km^{2} (2.95 sq mi)

Administration
- Japan
- Prefecture: Okinawa Prefecture

Demographics
- Ethnic groups: Ryukyuan, Japanese

Aguni Island (粟国島, Okinawan: Aguni) is an island in Japan, which is part of the Okinawa Islands and administered as Aguni Village in Shimajiri District, Okinawa Prefecture. It is located 60 km Northwest from Naha on Okinawa Island in East China Sea. It has an area of 7.64 km^{2}. It has one bar, one cop, no restaurants, no convenience stores and no taxis or buses. Besides the hotel, there are about 10 minshuku (guest houses) catering to the scuba divers who comprise the majority of visitors. The island manages commercial fishery, and its fishermen are usually also farmers. There is a port and an airstrip through which visitors can visit the island on a ferry or airplane.

== Climate ==
Climate data for Aguni (2003−2020 normals, extremes 2003−present)
Month	Jan	Feb	Mar	Apr	May	Jun	Jul	Aug	Sep	Oct	Nov	Dec	Year
Record high °C (°F)	26.0 (78.8)	26.4 (79.5)	27.0 (80.6)	28.8 (83.8)	30.9 (87.6)	33.7 (92.7)	34.8 (94.6)	35.3 (95.5)	35.0 (95.0)	32.9 (91.2)	29.6 (85.3)	28.2 (82.8)	35.3 (95.5)
Mean daily maximum °C (°F)	19.2 (66.6)	20.1 (68.2)	21.3 (70.3)	23.9 (75.0)	26.5 (79.7)	29.2 (84.6)	31.9 (89.4)	31.8 (89.2)	30.6 (87.1)	27.8 (82.0)	24.7 (76.5)	21.0 (69.8)	25.7 (78.2)
Daily mean °C (°F)	17.0 (62.6)	17.6 (63.7)	18.6 (65.5)	21.2 (70.2)	23.9 (75.0)	26.6 (79.9)	29.0 (84.2)	29.0 (84.2)	28.0 (82.4)	25.5 (77.9)	22.6 (72.7)	18.8 (65.8)	23.2 (73.7)
Mean daily minimum °C (°F)	14.7 (58.5)	15.3 (59.5)	16.2 (61.2)	18.7 (65.7)	21.6 (70.9)	24.7 (76.5)	26.7 (80.1)	26.6 (79.9)	25.7 (78.3)	23.6 (74.5)	20.6 (69.1)	16.7 (62.1)	20.9 (69.7)
Record low °C (°F)	4.9 (40.8)	5.6 (42.1)	6.1 (43.0)	10.3 (50.5)	12.2 (54.0)	17.0 (62.6)	21.9 (71.4)	22.4 (72.3)	18.5 (65.3)	15.7 (60.3)	12.3 (54.1)	7.2 (45.0)	4.9 (40.8)
Average precipitation mm (inches)	98.3 (3.87)	103.5 (4.07)	160.9 (6.33)	154.0 (6.06)	244.0 (9.61)	334.3 (13.16)	131.1 (5.16)	182.0 (7.17)	204.0 (8.03)	116.5 (4.59)	127.0 (5.00)	106.3 (4.19)	1,959.5 (77.15)
Average precipitation days (≥ 1.0 mm)	11.3	10.9	11.3	10.7	12.0	12.7	6.9	9.9	10.6	8.2	8.8	10.1	123.4
Source: JMA

== Transportation ==
Aguni Island is accessible by ferry from Naha's Tomari Port. The journey takes around 2 hours 10 minutes. There are a limited number of flights to the island each week.
