= Aguni Airport =

Aguni Airport 粟国空港
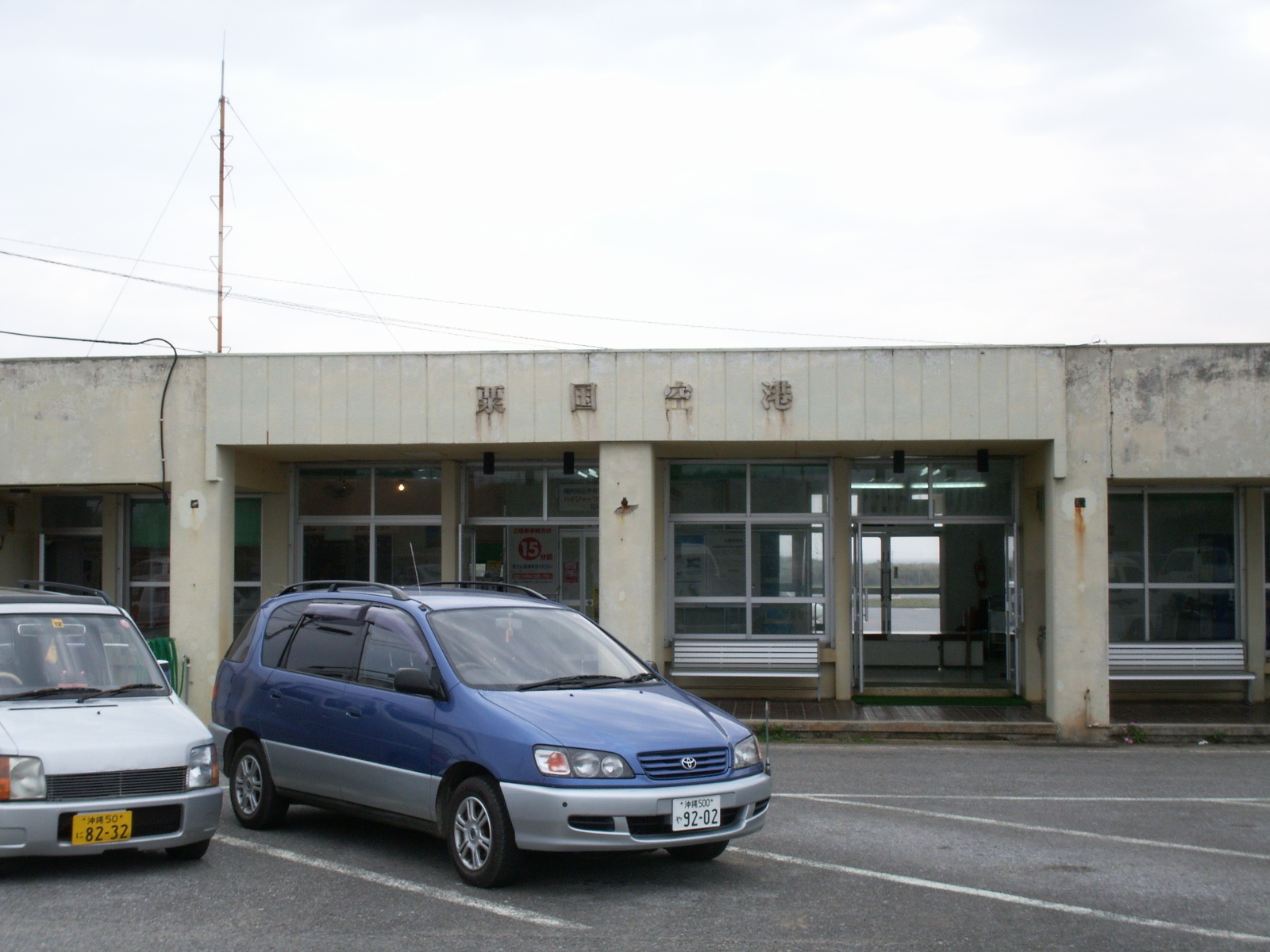
- IATA: AGJ; ICAO: RORA

Summary
- Airport type: Public
- Operator: Okinawa Prefecture
- Serves: Aguni, Okinawa, Japan
- Elevation AMSL: 38 ft (12 m)
- Coordinates: 26°35′34″N 127°14′25″E

Map
- Location in Japan RORA (Japan)

Runways
Direction	Length		Surface
Direction	m	ft	Surface
01/19	800	2,625	Asphalt concrete

Statistics (2015)
- Passengers: 7,521
- Cargo (metric tonnes): 1
- Aircraft movement: 1,204
- Source: Japanese Ministry of Land, Infrastructure, Transport and Tourism

Aguni Airport (粟国空港, Aguni Kūkō) (IATA: AGJ, ICAO: RORA) is an airport serving Aguni, a village in the Shimajiri District of the Okinawa Prefecture of Japan. The prefecture operates the airport, which is classified as a third class airport.
