= Ikei Island =

One of the Yokatsu Islands of Okinawa, Japan

- GSI aerial photograph of Ikei Island in 1993
- Interactive map of Ikei Island

Geography
- Coordinates: 26°23′38″N 127°59′51″E
- Archipelago: Ryukyu Islands; Okinawa Islands; Yokatsu Islands

Administration
- Japan
- Prefecture: Okinawa
- City: Uruma

Ikei Island (Japanese: 伊計島, Hepburn: Ikeijima) is one of the Yokatsu Islands within the Okinawa Islands of Japan. Administratively, it is part of the city of Uruma in Okinawa Prefecture. It is the location of the Nakabaru Ruins.
