= Irisuna-jima =

Island in Okinawa Prefecture, Japan

Native name: 入砂島
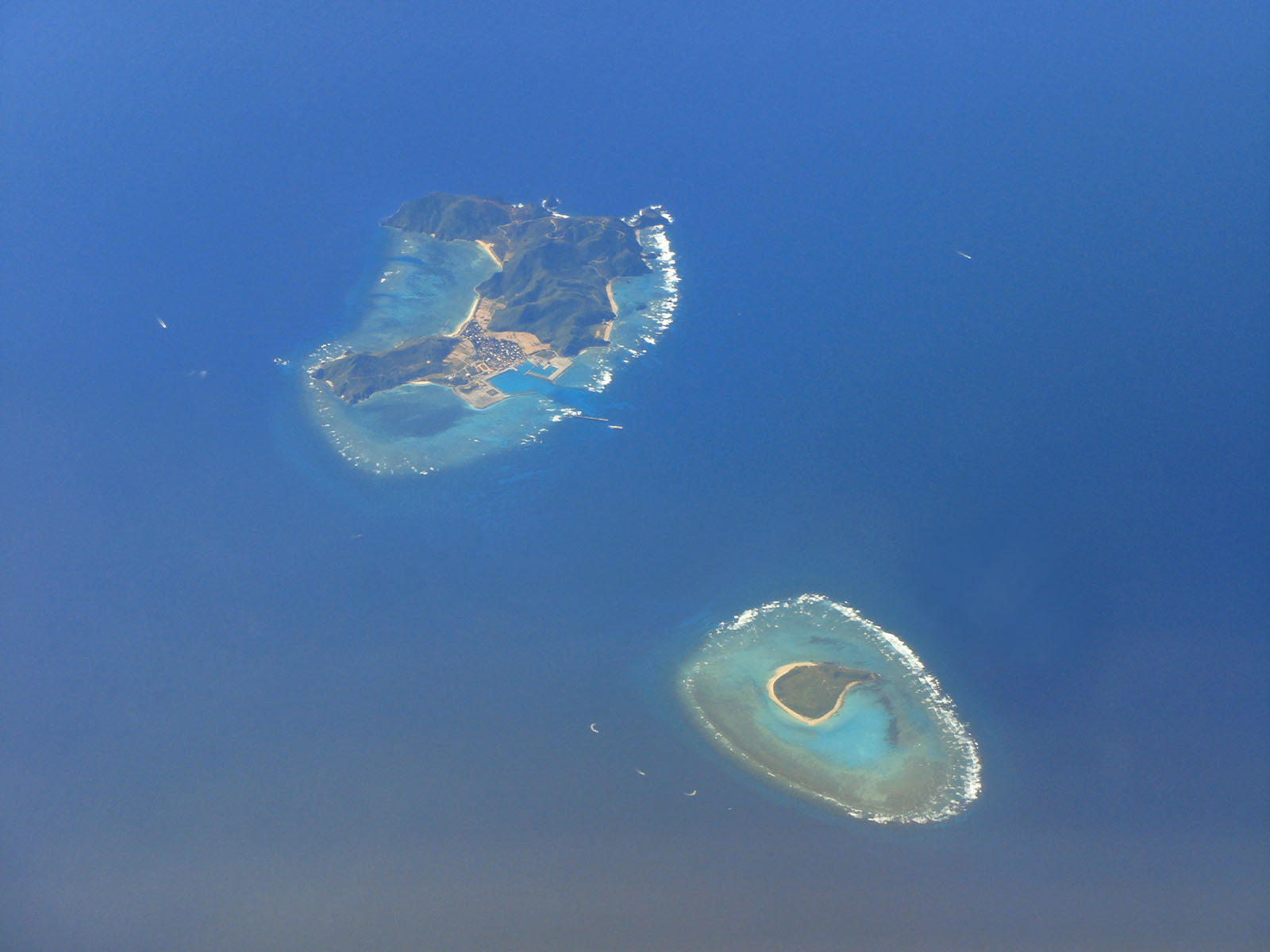
- Irisuna Island (below) and Tonaki Island (above)

- Location within Japan

Geography
- Location: Tonaki, Okinawa Prefecture
- Coordinates: 26°23′07″N 127°06′10″E
- Area: 0.26 km^{2} (0.10 sq mi)
- Highest elevation: 32 m (105 ft)

Administration
- Japan

Demographics
- Population: uninhabited

Irisuna-jima (入砂島), also known as Idesuna-jima (出砂島), is an uninhabited island in Tonaki, Okinawa Prefecture, Japan. It lies approximately four kilometres to the west of Cape Watanjisaki (ワタンジ崎), the northwest tip of Tonaki Island. Ceramics, including kamui ware and celadons, are evidence of human activity on the island over the longue durée. Public access is now prohibited since, under the designation FAC (Facilities Admin Code) 6078, Idesuna Jima Range (出砂島射爆撃場) is a live-fire training area for the United States Forces Japan.

== See also ==
- Tonaki Prefectural Natural Park
- Desert island
- List of islands
