= Tonaki Prefectural Natural Park =

Natural park in Okinawa Prefecture, Japan

- 渡名喜県立自然公園
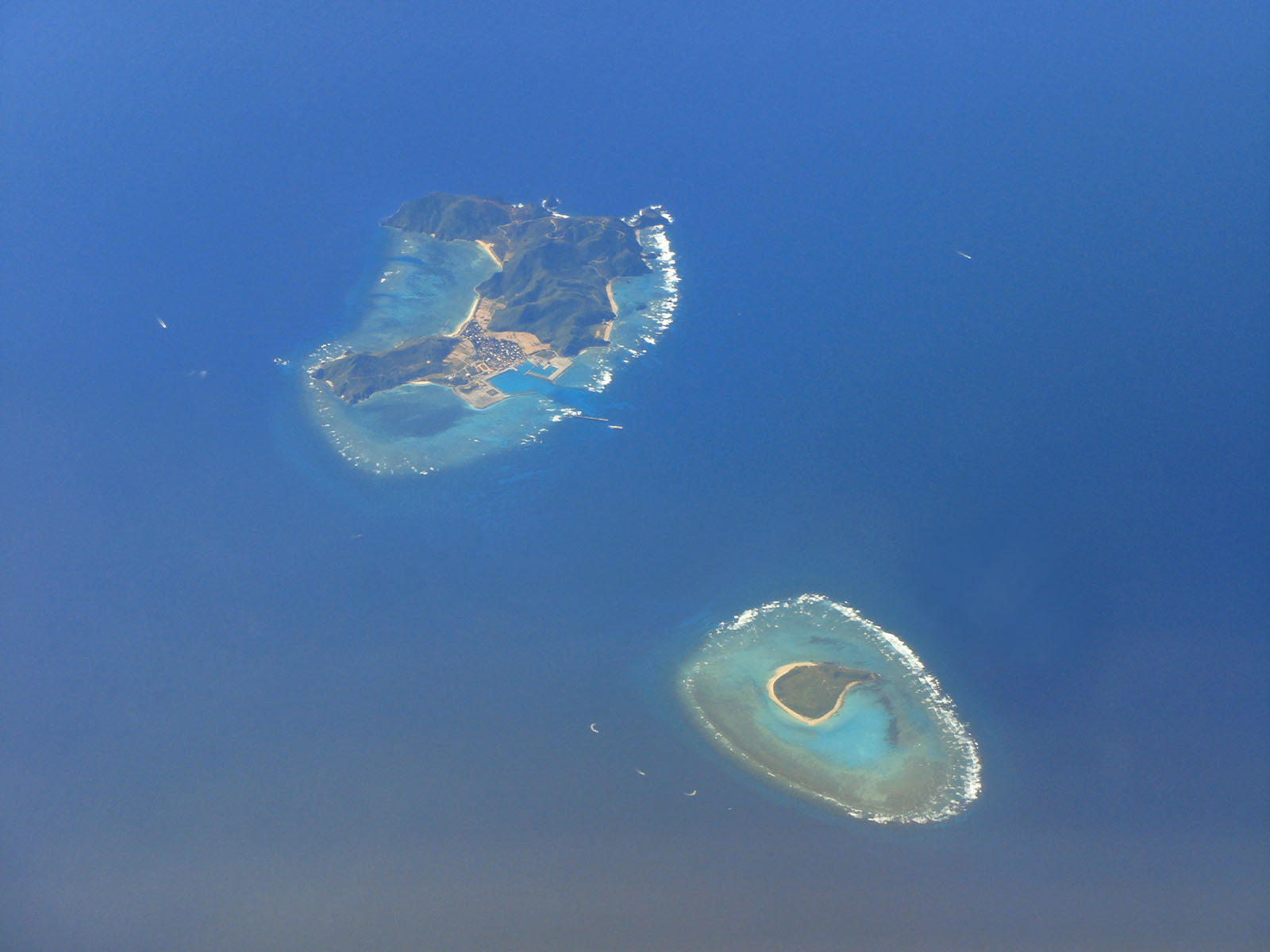
- Tonaki (far) and Irishina (near)
- Interactive map of Tonaki Prefectural Natural Park
- Location: Okinawa Prefecture, Japan
- Area: 16.02 km^{2} (6.19 sq mi)
- Established: 1 August 1997

Tonaki Prefectural Natural Park (渡名喜県立自然公園, Tonaki kenritsu shizen kōen) is a Prefectural Natural Park on and around the island of Tonaki, Okinawa Prefecture, Japan. The park was established in 1997 and includes a designated marine zone of 13 km^{2}.

== See also ==
- National Parks of Japan
- Iriomote-Ishigaki National Park
- Okinawa Kaigan Quasi-National Park
- Kumejima Prefectural Natural Park
- Irabu Prefectural Natural Park
