= Tsuken Island =

Island in Okinawa, Japan

Native name: 津堅島 Japanese: Tsuken-jima Okinawan: Biti Nickname: Carrot Island
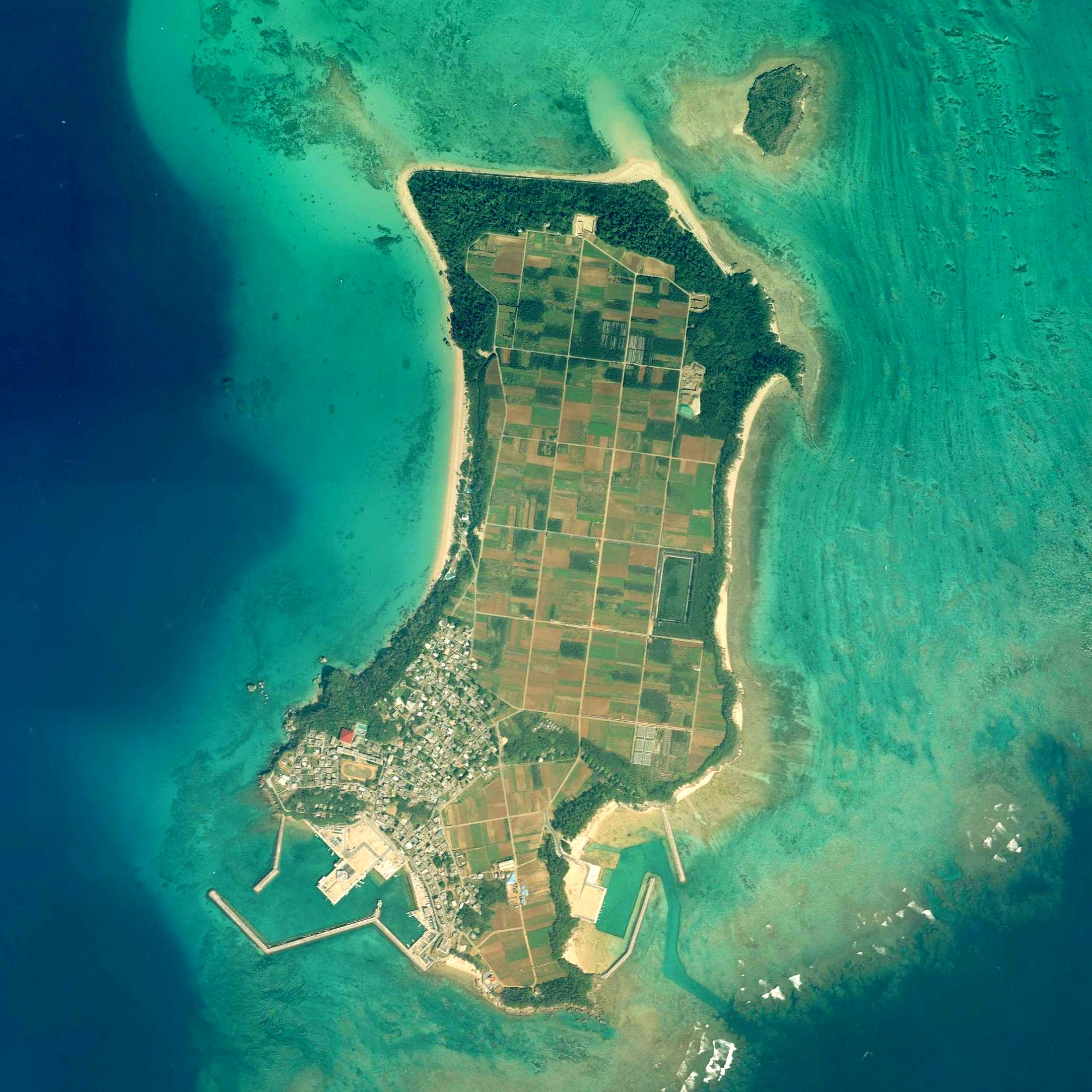
- Aerial view of Tsuken Island

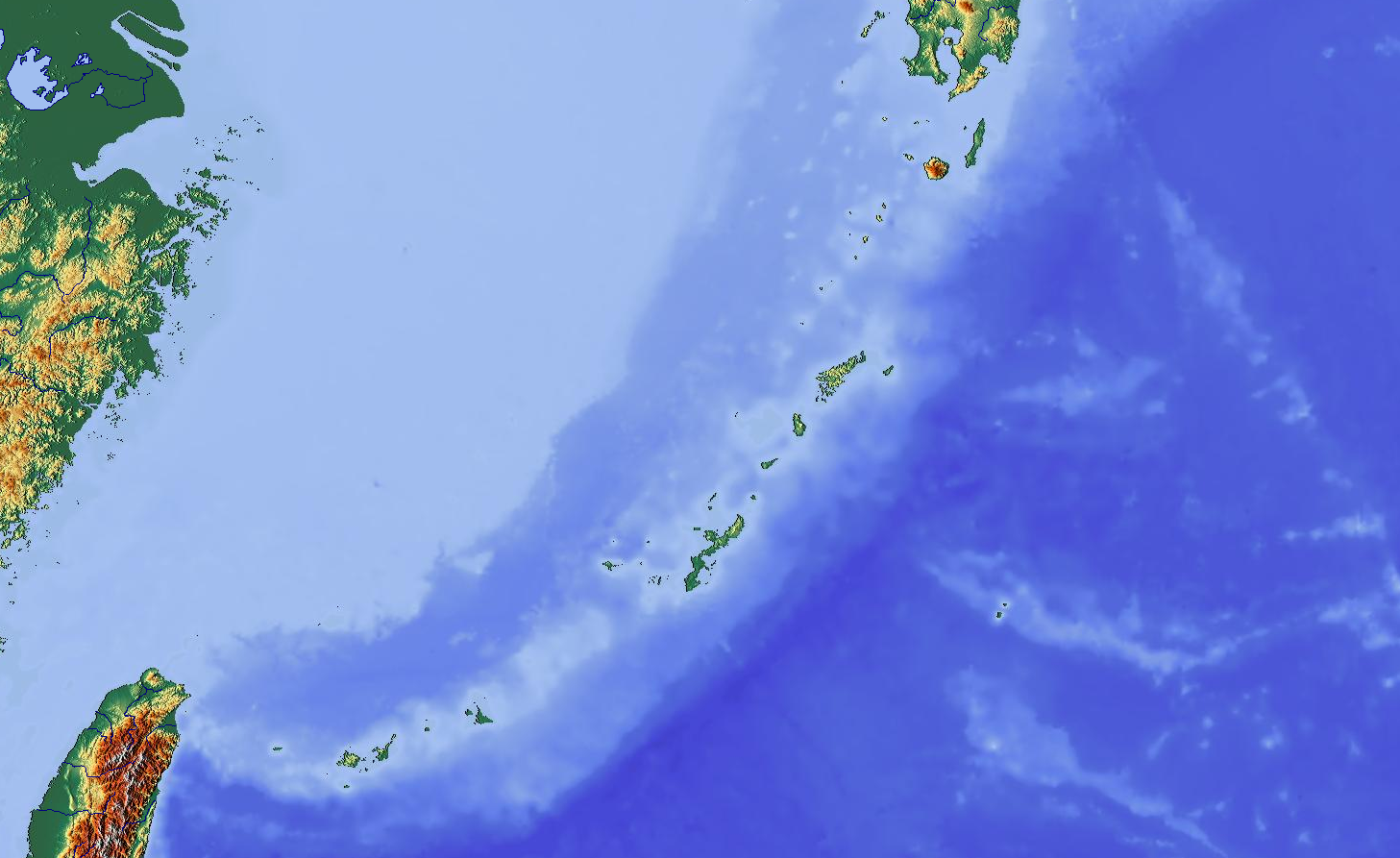
- Location within Ryukyu Islands

Geography
- Coordinates: 26°15′02″N 127°56′31″E
- Archipelago: Okinawa Islands
- Adjacent to: Philippine Sea
- Area: 1.88 km^{2} (0.73 sq mi)
- Length: 2.3 km (1.43 mi)
- Width: 1.3 km (0.81 mi)
- Coastline: 7 km (4.3 mi)
- Highest elevation: 38.8 m (127.3 ft)

Administration
- Japan
- Region: Kyūshū
- Prefecture: Okinawa
- City: Uruma

Demographics
- Population: 485 (2005)
- Ethnic groups: Ryukyuan, Japanese

Tsuken Island (津堅島, Tsuken-jima; Okinawan: Biti) is an island in the Philippine Sea in Uruma, Okinawa Prefecture, Japan. The island is southernmost of the Yokatsu Islands, and is located 3.8 kilometres (2.4 mi) south south-east of the Katsuren Peninsula off Okinawa Island at the entrance of Nakagusuku Bay. Tsuken covers 1.88 square kilometres (0.73 sq mi) and has a population of 487 residents.

The only settlement on Tsuken is located in the southwest of the island. The settlement includes the Port of Tsuken, a post office, and a medical clinic attached to the Okinawa Prefectural Chubu Hospital in Uruma. The island is home to Tsuken Elementary School (19 students) and Tsuken Junior High School (11 students). The island has no high school; students must leave the island after junior high school to continue their education. While residents of Tsuken speak standard Japanese, usage of the Okinawan language remains strong on the island, specifically the South-Central dialect of the language.

== Geography ==
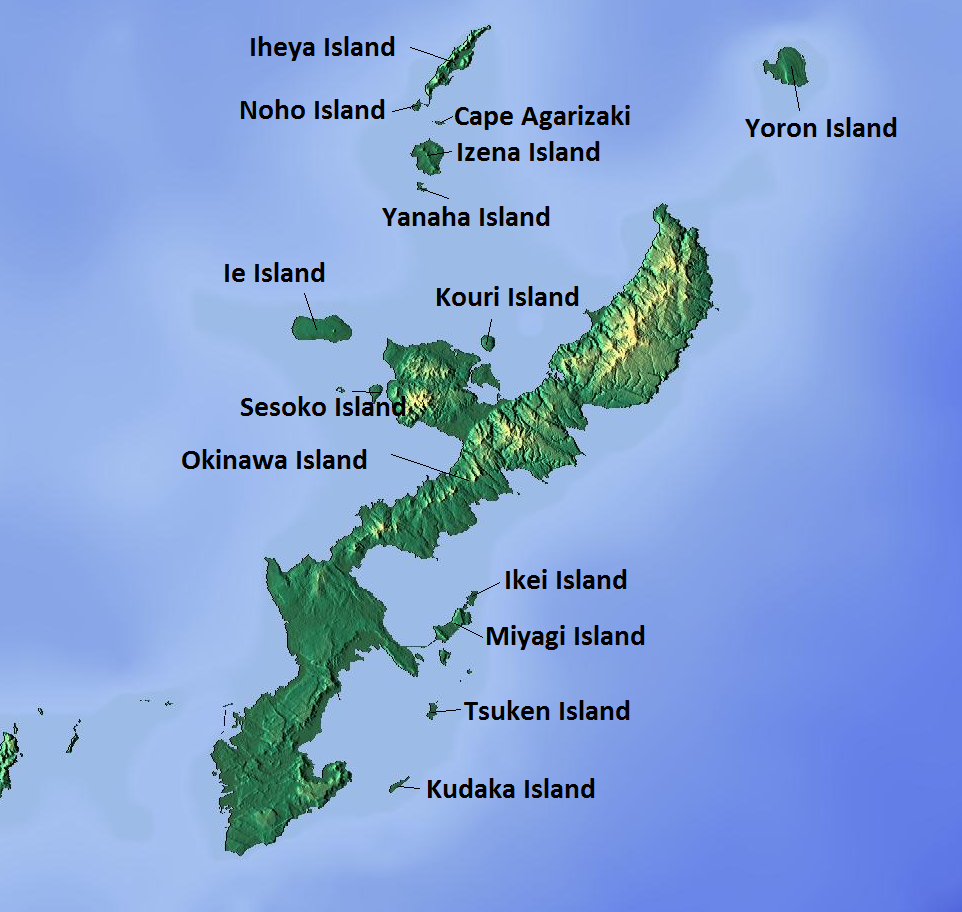
Map of the Okinawa Islands, showing the location of Tsuken Island to the south of Okinawa Island

Tsuken runs 2.3 kilometres (1.4 mi) from north to south and .8 kilometres (0.50 mi) to 1.3 kilometres (0.81 mi) east to west. Its highest point is in the southwest of the island at 38.8 metres (127 ft).

Tsuken was once covered with a dense forest of fountain palms, but the middle portion of Tsuken was entirely burned during World War II, and palm groves remain only at the north of the island. Thick belts of vegetation that now exist around coastal areas of the island protect the settlement and agricultural land from sea breeze. The central and northern parts of Tsuken are used for the production of carrots, a noted agricultural product of the island.

== History ==
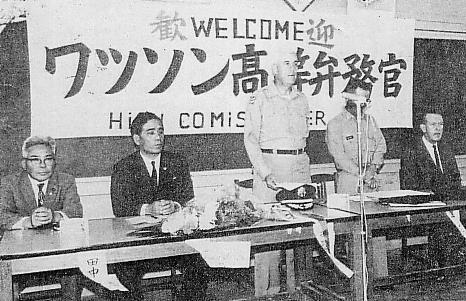
Nakabaru Site, Ikei Island

Tsuken is historically linked to Kudaka Island to the south. Safe passage between the islands was possible at low tide via small boats, and there was considerable cultural exchange between the islands. Tsuken was settled early in the history of the Ryukyu Islands, as evidenced by its numerous shell mounds, of which three have been excavated. Tsuken was home to the ruins of a small castle, the Kubō Gusuku. Commodore Matthew Calbraith Perry recorded the island as "Taking Island" in his narrative on travel to the Ryukyu Islands.

The areas of present-day Uruma were affected in World War II during the initial part of the Battle of Okinawa. L-Day, the initial land invasion of Okinawa Island, occurred on April 1, 1945. American forces swept across the island quickly, and by April 5 had secured the entirety of the Katsuren Peninsula. A smaller invasion force invaded the Yokatsu Islands on L-Day, and encountered stiff resistance from the Japanese military. Tsuken Island was completely devastated by fire in the battle. Casualties for Japanese troops were 234 killed; for the US battalion of the 27th infantry division:11 killed and 3 MIA; 80 wounded. After the capture of Tsuken, American forces swept north and reached Ikei Island on April 11, thus securing all the Yokatsu Islands.

Tsuken is in a period of population decline. In 1970 the island had 1,172 residents and 245 households; by 2005 the population was at 485 residents and 210 households.

== Economy ==
Tsuken is noted for its production of carrots, and is known by the nickname "Carrot Island". With white sandy beaches and a broad coral reef, tourism is an important part of the economy. The island has three small hotels and a campground, and also sees numerous day visitors from Okinawa Island. In contrast to its population decline, tourism is growing on Tsuken: in 1975, shortly after the reversion of Okinawa Prefecture to Japan, only 3,000 tourists visited the island. In 2007 the number had grown to 48,887.

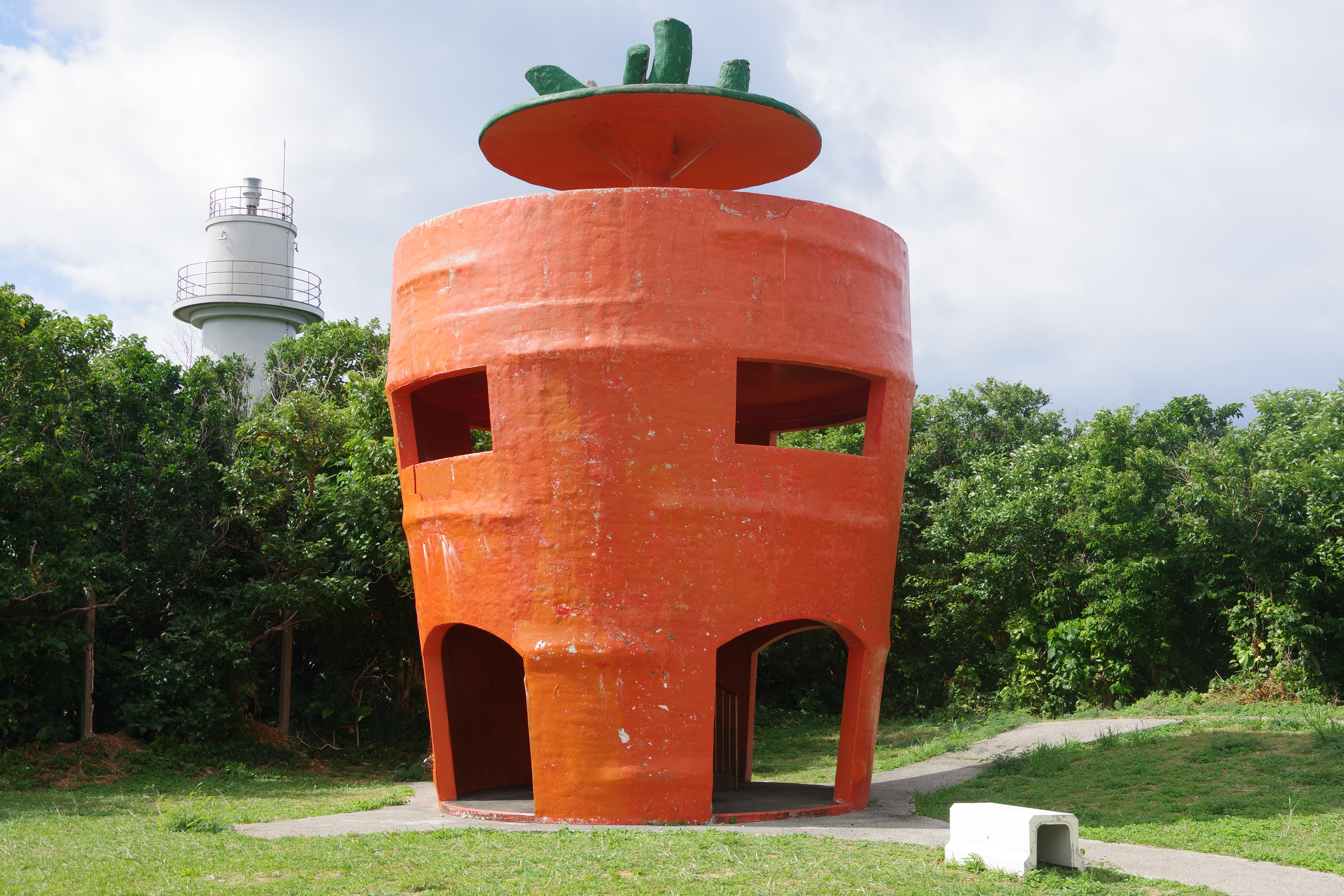
Tsuken Island has a carrot-shaped observatory in honor of its high carrot production.

== Transportation ==
Tsuken is accessible only by ferry. The Kamiya Tourism Company operates a ferry service fives times a day between the pier at Heshikiya on the Katsuren Peninsula in Uruma City. Tsuken is reached by high-speed ferry in 12 minutes, and regular ferry in 30 minutes. The island has no bus, taxi, or rental car service; all locations on the island are reached by foot.

== Military training area ==
The Tsukenjima Training Area (FAC6082 Tsuken Jima Training Area) is used by the United States Marines and is located off the western coast of Tsuken. The training area was established in 1959 and covers 16,000 square metres (170,000 ft^{2}).

== See also ==
- Naval Base Okinawa
