= Miyagi Island (Uruma, Okinawa) =

Island in Uruma, Okinawa, Japan

宮城島 Nakagushiku-Jima
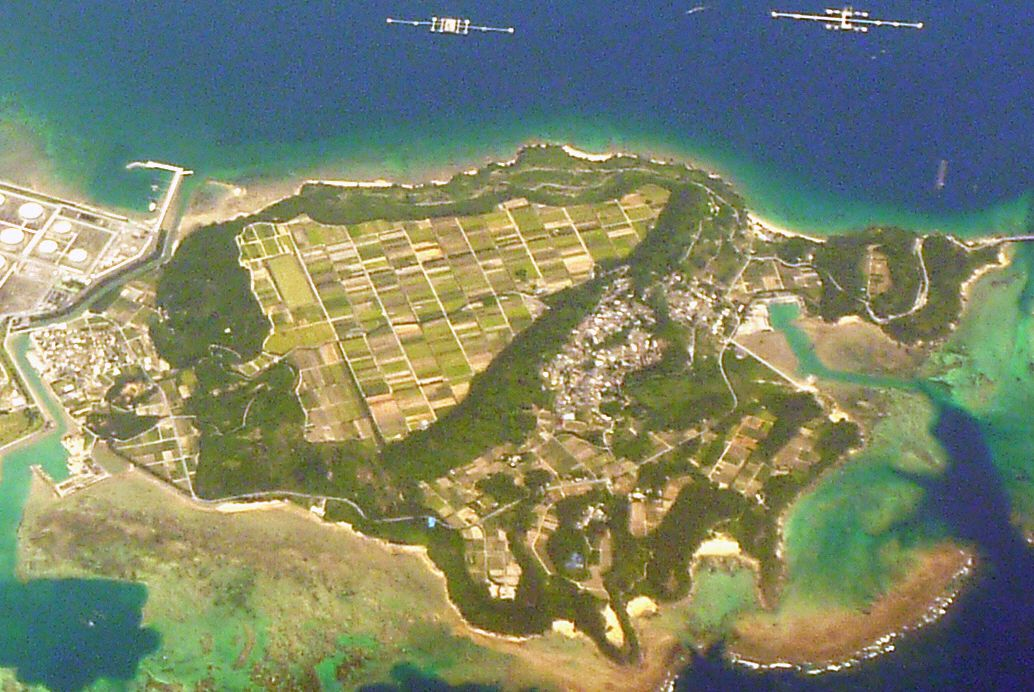
- Aerial view of Miyagi Island
- Interactive map of Miyagi Island

Geography
- Coordinates: 26°22′11″N 127°59′01″E
- Archipelago: Ryukyu Islands
- Area: 5.54 km^{2} (2.14 sq mi)
- Highest elevation: 121.4 m (398.3 ft)

Administration
- Japan
- Okinawa Prefecture
- Uruma City

Demographics
- Ethnic groups: Ryukyuan, Japanese

Miyagi Island (宮城島, Okinawan: Naagushiku-jima) is an island located in the Yokatsu Islands of Okinawa Prefecture, Japan. It is also known as Takanaharijima (タカナハリジマ) in the Okinawan language, meaning "a high and distant island". This is a reference to its greater elevation compared to other nearby landmarks.

Miyagi Island is connected to the main Okinawa Island through a bridge that runs across Henza Island, making it accessible by car or bus. There are four villages on the island: Uehara (上原), Miyagi (宮城), Tōbaru (桃原) and Ikemi (池味).

== History ==
Along with the rest of the Yokatsu Islands, Miyagi was under the control of Chūzan during the Sanzan period. In 1429, Chūzan united the Okinawa Islands and formed the Ryukyu Kingdom. Under Ryukyuan rule, Miyagi Island was used as a place of exile for political criminals. In 1879, the Ryukyu Kingdom was annexed by the Japanese Empire, and control of Miyagi Island was transferred to Okinawa Prefecture.

At the end of World War II, Miyagi Island went under the control of the United States Civil Administration of the Ryukyu Islands, lasting from 1950 to 1972. It was returned to Japan following the Okinawa Reversion Agreement.

As evidenced by the ruins of Shigumu and Takamine, humans have inhabited the island since ancient times.

== Climate ==
Climate data for Miyagi Island (2008−2020 normals, extremes 2008−present)
Month	Jan	Feb	Mar	Apr	May	Jun	Jul	Aug	Sep	Oct	Nov	Dec	Year
Record high °C (°F)	25.4 (77.7)	26.8 (80.2)	26.7 (80.1)	28.9 (84.0)	32.4 (90.3)	32.3 (90.1)	34.7 (94.5)	35.6 (96.1)	34.3 (93.7)	33.1 (91.6)	30.7 (87.3)	28.3 (82.9)	35.6 (96.1)
Mean daily maximum °C (°F)	19.0 (66.2)	19.8 (67.6)	21.1 (70.0)	23.1 (73.6)	25.9 (78.6)	28.8 (83.8)	30.9 (87.6)	31.1 (88.0)	30.2 (86.4)	27.5 (81.5)	24.3 (75.7)	20.5 (68.9)	25.2 (77.3)
Daily mean °C (°F)	16.7 (62.1)	17.2 (63.0)	18.5 (65.3)	20.5 (68.9)	23.4 (74.1)	26.4 (79.5)	28.3 (82.9)	28.4 (83.1)	27.5 (81.5)	25.1 (77.2)	22.0 (71.6)	18.3 (64.9)	22.7 (72.8)
Mean daily minimum °C (°F)	14.7 (58.5)	15.2 (59.4)	16.4 (61.5)	18.5 (65.3)	21.5 (70.7)	24.6 (76.3)	26.4 (79.5)	26.5 (79.7)	25.6 (78.1)	23.3 (73.9)	20.3 (68.5)	16.4 (61.5)	20.8 (69.4)
Record low °C (°F)	4.9 (40.8)	9.7 (49.5)	9.0 (48.2)	12.5 (54.5)	15.5 (59.9)	19.1 (66.4)	20.8 (69.4)	23.0 (73.4)	21.2 (70.2)	18.3 (64.9)	13.9 (57.0)	9.6 (49.3)	4.9 (40.8)
Average precipitation mm (inches)	83.4 (3.28)	106.9 (4.21)	118.1 (4.65)	141.2 (5.56)	294.7 (11.60)	293.5 (11.56)	124.3 (4.89)	185.3 (7.30)	172.5 (6.79)	203.0 (7.99)	134.9 (5.31)	98.8 (3.89)	1,945.4 (76.59)
Average precipitation days (≥ 1.0 mm)	9.2	9.0	9.3	10.3	11.8	12.6	8.3	11.1	10.6	8.9	8.1	9.2	118.4
Mean monthly sunshine hours	98.0	102.0	143.9	143.3	154.4	183.7	275.1	250.1	217.2	176.4	130.5	105.9	1,980.6
Source: Japan Meteorological Agency

== See also ==
- Yokatsu Islands
- Katsuren Peninsula
- Okinawa Islands
