= Iheya Island =

Island within the Okinawa Islands of Japan

Coordinates: 27.052°N 127.975°E

Native name: 伊平屋
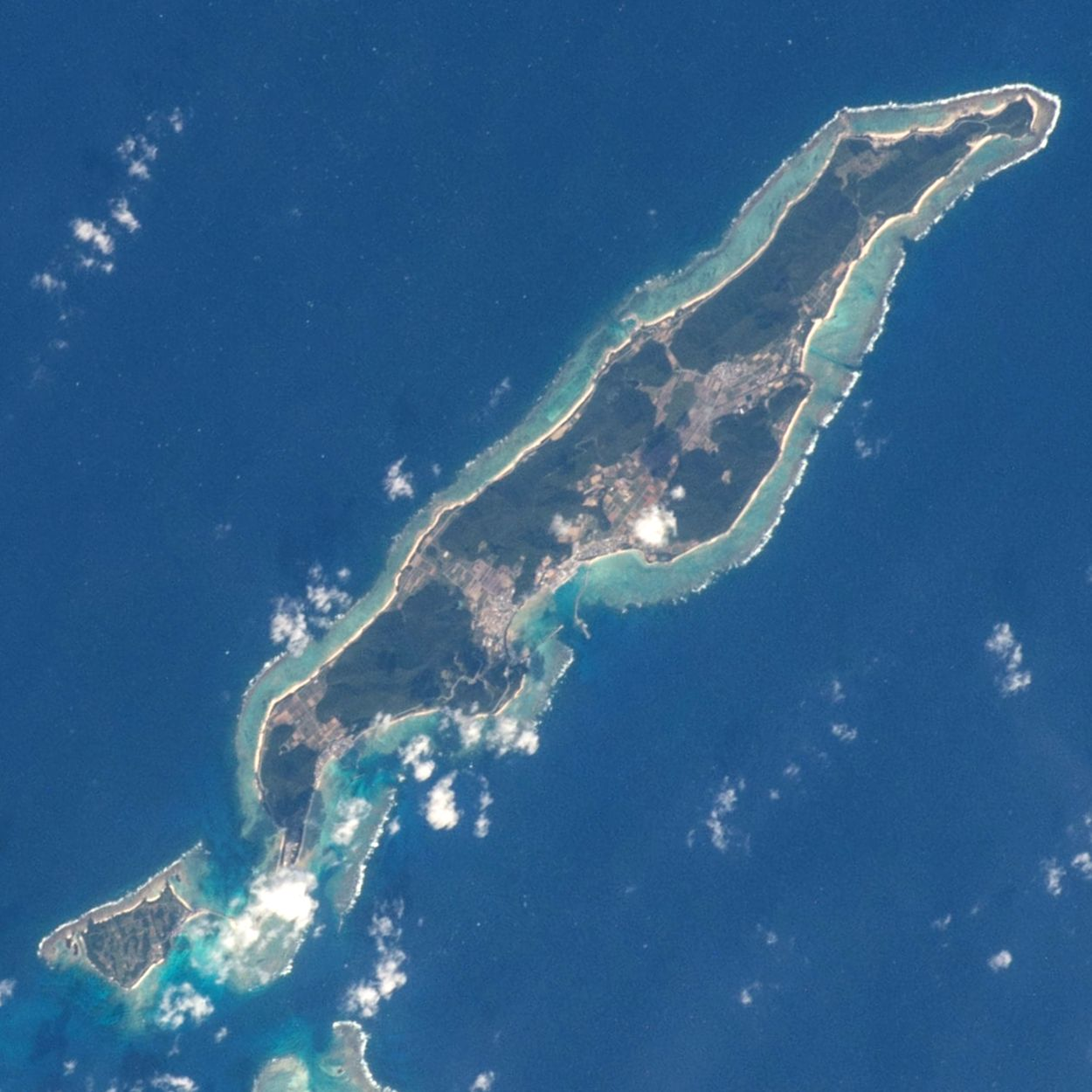
- Interactive map of Iheya Island

Geography
- Location: Pacific Ocean
- Archipelago: Okinawa Islands
- Area: 20.66 km^{2} (7.98 sq mi)

Administration
- Japan
- Prefecture: Okinawa Prefecture

Demographics
- Population: 1,200
- Ethnic groups: Ryukyuan, Japanese

Iheya Island (Japanese: 伊平屋島; Okinawan: Ihyājima; Kunigami: Ippyā) is an island located in the Okinawa Islands of Okinawa Prefecture, Japan.

Its total population is 1,200, most of whom are ethnic Ryukyuans. To the southeast of Iheya is nearby Izena Island.

According to historian George H. Kerr, local legends suggest that early settlers took refuge from storms and enemies in a hillside cave on the island called Kumaya Cave, and as such it "has been held in peculiar reverence in the folklore of Okinawa." For example, Kumaya Cave is associated with the legendary Amano-Iwato and the island is locally considered the place where Jimmu's Eastern Expedition began.

== See also ==
- Okinawa Islands
- Okinawa Prefecture
