= Hamahiga Island =

Island in Okinawa, Japan

浜比嘉島 Hamahija shima
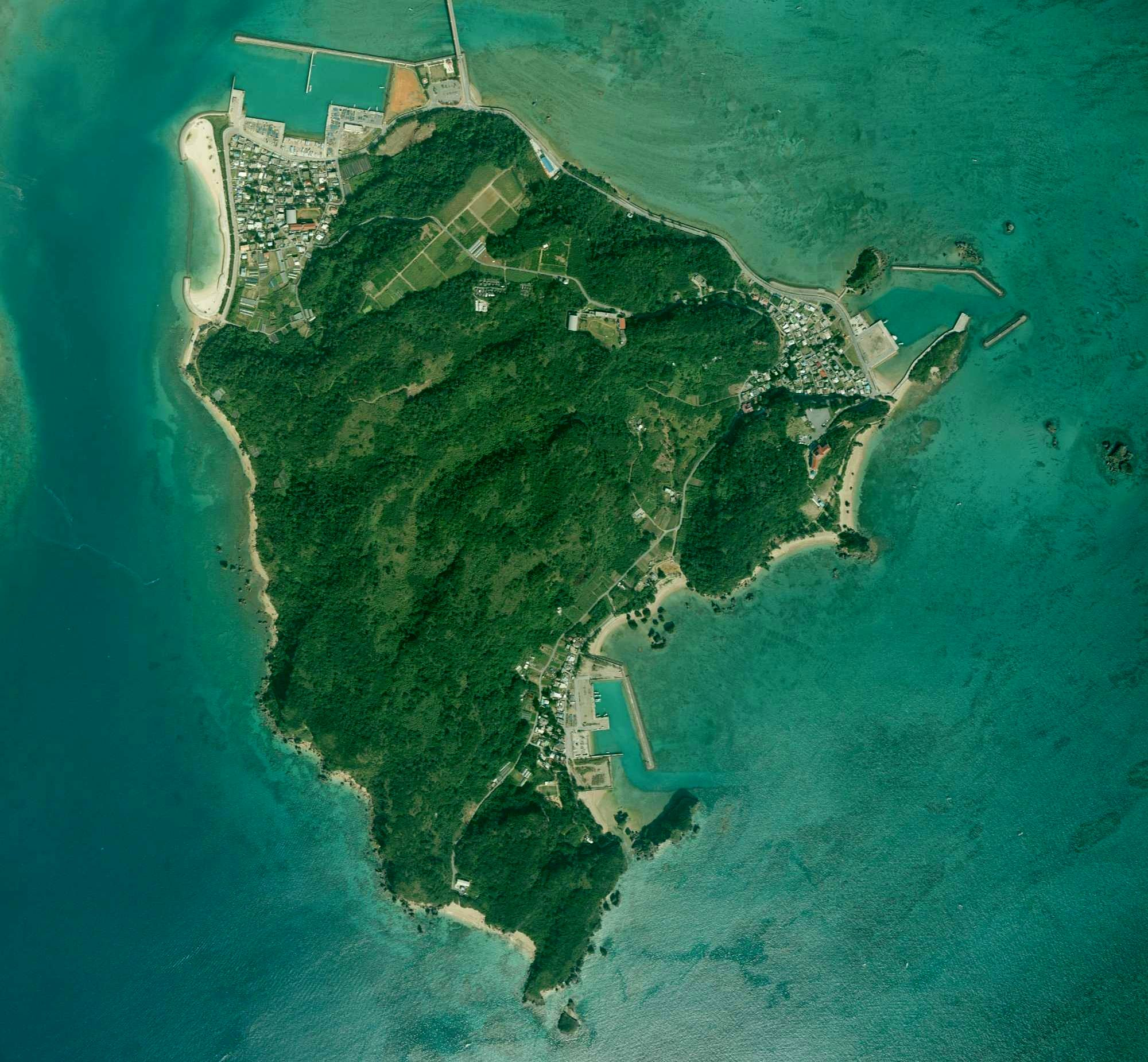

Geography
- Coordinates: 26°19′14″N 127°57′30″E
- Archipelago: Ryukyu Islands

Administration
- Japan
- Okinawa Prefecture
- Uruma City

Demographics
- Population: 600
- Ethnic groups: Ryukyuan, Japanese

Hamahiga Island (浜比嘉島, Okinawan: Bamahija-shima) is an island located in the Yokatsu Islands of Okinawa Prefecture, Japan. Its administered by the city of Uruma and is located near the Katsuren Peninsula. The island has an area of 2.09 square kilometers.

Hamahiga has a total population of 600 people. There are two villages on the island, Hama (浜) to the north and Higa (比嘉) to the south.

== History ==
During the Sanzan period, Hamahiga and the rest of the Yokatsu Islands were under the control of Chūzan. By the 15th century, Chūzan had united the Okinawa Islands, forming the Ryukyu Kingdom.

In 1879, Japan annexed the Ryukyu Kingdom, turning it into Okinawa Prefecture. Hamahiga was a part of this prefecture until the end of World War II, when Okinawa in its entirety were placed under the United States Civil Administration of the Ryukyu Islands from 1950 to 1972. After the Okinawa Reversion Agreement, Hamahiga was once again placed under the administration of Japan.

== Culture ==
Hamahiga Island is notable for its preservation of Okinawan culture. This can be seen in the widespread usage of both traditional cuisine and architecture.

In the Ryukyuan religion, it's believed that the creation goddess, Amamikyu, and her partner, Shinerikyu, lived in a cave in southern Hamahiga after creating the Okinawa Islands. Amamikyu's tomb is also said to be in Hamahiga. Utaki dedicated to them are found on the island.

== See also ==
- Yokatsu Islands
- Katsuren Peninsula
- Okinawa Islands
- Uruma City
