= Tonaki, Okinawa =

Tonaki 渡名喜村 Tunachi
- Village
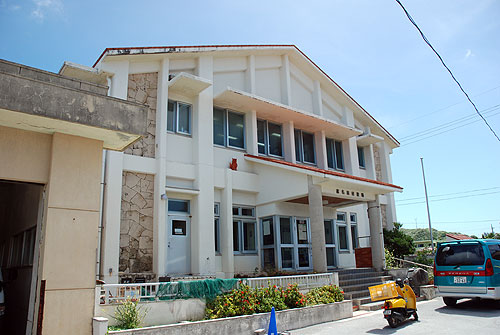
- Tonaki Village Office

- Flag Seal
- Location of Tonaki in Okinawa Prefecture

- Location in Japan
- Coordinates: 26°22′20″N 127°08′28″E
- Country: Japan
- Region: Kyushu
- Prefecture: Okinawa Prefecture
- District: Shimajiri

Area
  - Total: 3.74 km^{2} (1.44 sq mi)

Population (2022)
  - Total: 334
  - Density: 89.3/km^{2} (231/sq mi)
- Time zone: UTC+09:00 (JST)
- City hall address: 1917-3, Tonaki-son, Shimajiri-gun, Okinawa-ken; 901-3692
- Website: www.vill.tonaki.okinawa.jp
- Symbols
- Flower: Kawara Nadeshiko (Dianthus longicalyx)
- Tree: Fukugi (Garcinia subelliptica)

Tonaki (渡名喜村, Tonaki-son; Okinawan: トゥナチ Tunachi) is a village located in Shimajiri District, Okinawa Prefecture, Japan. The village consists of Tonaki Island and the uninhabited Irisuna Island.

As of 2020, the village has an estimated population of 334 and a density of 89 persons per km^{2}. The total area is 3.74 square kilometres (1.44 mi^{2}). The highest point in Tonaki is on Tonaki Island at 178.4 metres (585 ft).

Tonaki is located approximately 58 kilometres (36 mi) northwest of the prefectural capital of Naha. The village is accessible by regular ferry service from Tomari Port in Naha.

Tonaki was once an active center of bonito fishing, but now the village economy is evenly divided between agriculture and fishing. Tonaki is in a long-term state of population decline.

== See also ==
- Groups of Traditional Buildings
- Tonaki Prefectural Natural Park
