= Yokatsu Islands =

Group of islands within the Ryukyu Islands

Coordinates: 26°19′N 127°58′E

Native name: 与勝諸島
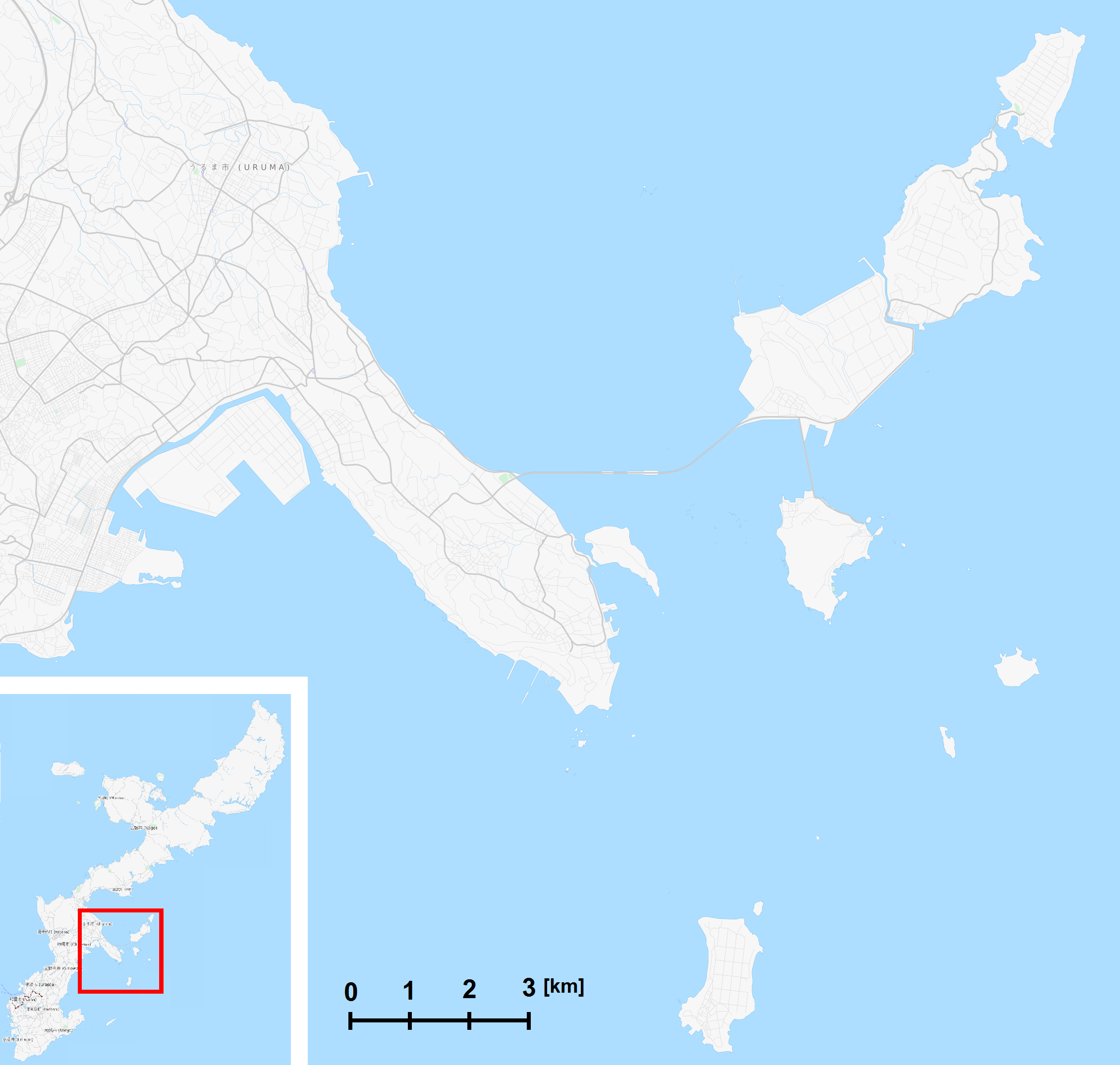
- Interactive map of Yokatsu Islands

Geography
- Archipelago: Ryukyu Islands

Administration
- Japan
- Okinawa Prefecture
- Uruma

Demographics
- Ethnic groups: Ryukyuan, Japanese

The Yokatsu Islands (Japanese: 与勝諸島, Hepburn: Yokatsu-shotō) are a group of eight islands located in the Ryukyu Islands archipelago. It is situated to the east of the Katsuren Peninsula in Okinawa Prefecture, Japan. The inhabited islands are connected by a series of causeways and bridges. The local economy is dependent on agriculture, small-scale tourism, and salt production. Part of Tsuken Island, and Ukibara and Minamiukibara Islands host United States military facilities. The islands also host ancient Ryukyuan tombs, caves, and archaeological sites.

== Geography ==
Yokatsu Islands form a group of eight islands located in the Ryukyu Islands archipelago. It is situated to the northwest of Katsuren Peninsula and forms part of Uruma in Okinawa Prefecture in Japan. Yokatsu includes the following islands–Henza, Miyagi, Ikei, Hamahiga, Tsuken, Yabuchi, Ukibara and Minamiukibara Islands.

== Connectivity ==
The Kaichu-doro ("Road Through the Sea") is a 4.7 km (2.9 mi) long series of causeways and bridges that connects the main Okinawa Island with four of the Yokatsu Islands of Henza, Miyagi, Hamahiga, and Ikei. The other islands can be reached by ferry.

== Culture and economy ==
The local economy is dependent on agriculture, small-scale tourism, and salt production. Henza Island is heavily industrialized with oil storage tanks, and forms the primary link between the mainland and the other islands. Miyagi Island consists of sugarcane farms and salt production facilities. It also hosts many tombs from the Ryukyuan period. Ikei is known for its beaches and small-scale agriculture. Hamahiga is notable for sacred caves tied to Okinawan mythology, and beaches. Further south, Tsuken Island is popular for its carrot farming and tourism, though part of the island hosts a United States military facility. Yabuchi Island does not have permanent settlements but is cultivated for rice, and contains archaeological remains and ancient settlements dating back 6,500 years. Ukibara and Minamiukibara are off-limits to public and used by the United States military.
