= Henza Island =

Island in Okinawa, Japan

Native name: 平安座島 Hyanja
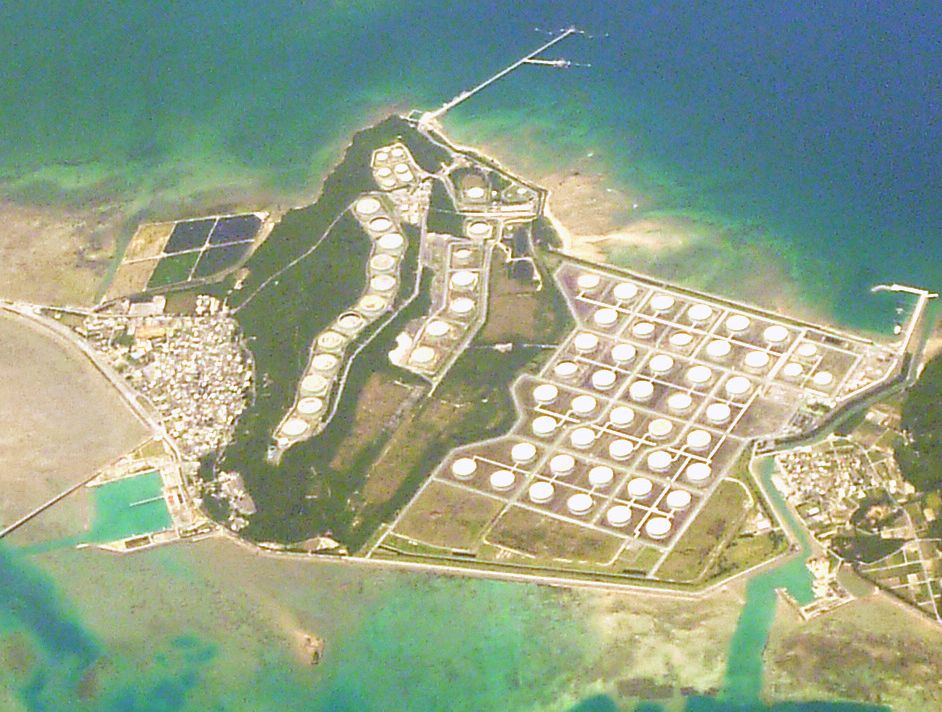

Geography
- Coordinates: 26°20′57″N 127°57′36″E
- Archipelago: Yokatsu Islands (Ryukyu Islands)

Administration
- Japan
- Okinawa Prefecture
- Uruma City

Demographics
- Population: 1,800+
- Ethnic groups: Ryukyuan, Japanese

Henza Island (平安座島, Okinawan: Henza or Hyanza) is an islet in the Yokatsu Islands of Okinawa Prefecture. Japan. Situated next to Miyagi Island, the two are separated by a 3 to 10 meter wide channel.

Its only village, Yonashirohenza, is located in the very south of the island and has a population of roughly 1,800, with the rest of the island being used for oil refineries and tank farms. These oil refineries are restricted, meaning only the village and a road on the island's east side leading to Miyagi Island are open for public access.
