= Okinawa's Diet electoral districts =

Diet of Japan electoral districts in Okinawa Prefecture

Okinawa's House of Representatives districts as of 2018

Okinawa currently sends 8 elected members to the Diet of Japan, 6 to the House of Representatives and 2 to the House of Councillors.

== House of Representatives ==
The current House of Representatives Okinawa delegation consists of 2 members of the LDP, 1 JCP, 1 SDP, 1 LP and 1 NIK.

=== District seats ===
District	Representative	Party	Incumbency
1st	Seiken Akamine (C-Naha)	JCP	15 December 2014 – present
2nd	Kunio Arakaki (SD-Ginowan)	SDP	3 November 2021 – present
3rd	Aiko Shimajiri (LD-Okinawa City)	LDP	3 November 2021 – present
4th	Kōsaburō Nishime (LD-Haebaru)	LDP	1 November 2017 – present

=== PR seats ===
Okinawa Prefecture is part of the Kyushu proportional representation block. In the current Diet, there are two Representatives from Okinawa elected through the Kyushu PR block.

Representative(s)	Party	District contested	Incumbency
Kōnosuke Kokuba (LD-Naha)	LDP	Okinawa-1st	15 December 2014 – present
Masahisa Miyazaki (LD-Ginowan)	LDP	Okinawa-2nd	22 November 2018 – present

== House of Councillors ==
The current House of Councillors Okinawa delegation consists of 2 independent members. Both are members of the Okinawa Whirlwind caucus in the House. The members are elected from the Okinawa at-large district.

Party	Councillors	Term ends	Incumbency
OW	Yōichi Iha	2022	26 July 2016 – present
OW	Tetsuo Takara	2025	29 July 2019 – present
