= 1972 Okinawa gubernatorial election =

← 1968	25 June 1972	1976 →
- Turnout: 76.32 ▼12.79
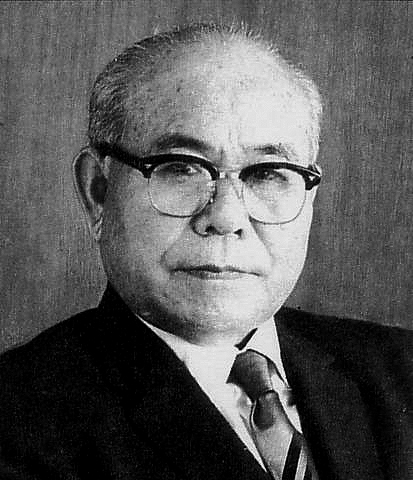

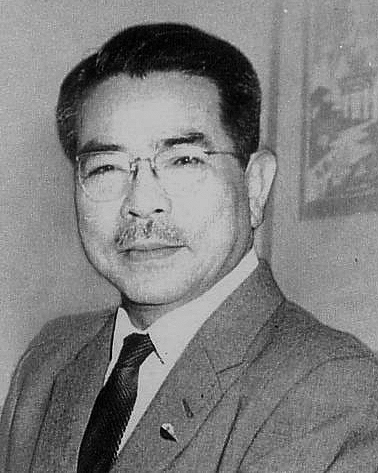
Nominee	Chōbyō Yara	Seisaku Ota
Popular vote	251,230	177,780
Percentage	58.56%	41.44%
Governor before election
Chōbyō Yara
OSMP
Elected Governor
Chōbyō Yara
OSMP

A gubernatorial election was held on 25 June 1972 to elect the Governor of Okinawa (沖縄県, Okinawa-ken), the prefecture is the southernmost and westernmost prefecture of Japan.

This is the first election since the return of the prefecture to Japanese control. Previously the island was administered by the United States Civil Administration of the Ryukyu Islands.

== Candidates ==
- Chōbyō Yara, 69, incumbent since 1968, endorsed by the union of the left (Progress and Unity), including the OSMP, JSP and JCP.
- Seisaku Ota, 68, backed by LDP.

== Results ==
Okinawa gubernatorial 1972
Party	Candidate	Votes	%	±%
Okinawa Social Mass	Chōbyō Yara *	251,230	58.56	▲5.05
LDP	Seisaku Ota	177,780	41.44	▼4.99
Total valid votes		429,010		
Turnout			76.32	▼12.79
Registered electors				
Okinawa Social Mass hold		Swing	17.12	
