= 2002 Okinawa gubernatorial election =

← 1998	17 November 2002	2006 →
- Turnout: 57.22 ▼9.32
Governor before election
Keiichi Inamine
LDP
Elected Governor
Keiichi Inamine
LDP

A gubernatorial election was held on 17 November 2002 to elect the Governor of Okinawa (山口県, Okinawa-ken), who is the southernmost and westernmost prefecture of Japan.

== Candidates ==
- Keiichi Inamine, 69, incumbent (elected in 1998), backed by LDP, NK and NCP.
- Masanori Yoshimoto, 65, former vice governor of Okinawa prefecture, endorsed by DPJ, SDP, OSMP, LP.
- Shigenobu Araki, 60, president of Okinawa Prefecture Medical Co-op, chairman of the local chapter of JCP.
- Mitsuo Matayoshi, 54, a conservative Protestant preacher. He led his own party, the World Economic Community Party.

== Results ==
Okinawa gubernatorial election, 2002
Party	Candidate	Votes	%	±%
LDP	Keiichi Inamine *	359,604	64.38	▲11.95
Democratic	Masanori Yoshimoto	148,401	26.57	▼19.38
JCP	Shigenobu Araki	46,230	8.38	n/a
World Economic Community Party	Mitsuo Matayoshi	4,330	0.67	▲0.30
Total valid votes		558,565	98.91	
Turnout		564.751	57.22	▼9.32
Registered electors		987.030		
LDP hold		Swing	37.81	

This is the first time that the JCP has presented a candidate of its own, outside the opposition alliance.
