= 2014 Okinawa gubernatorial election =

- December 9, 2014
- Turnout: 64.13%
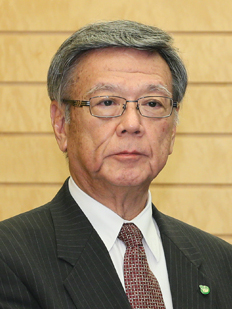

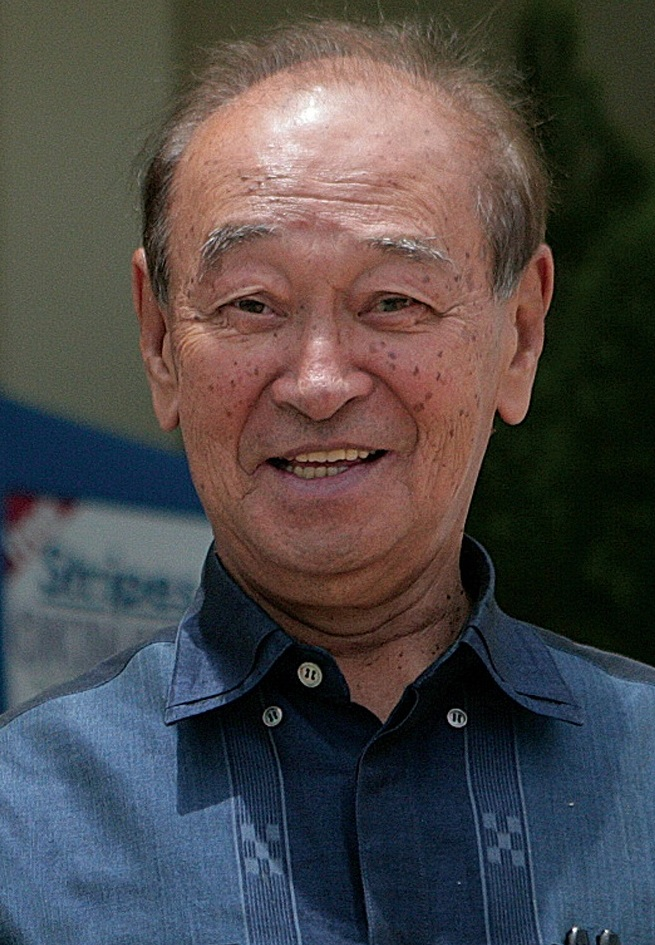

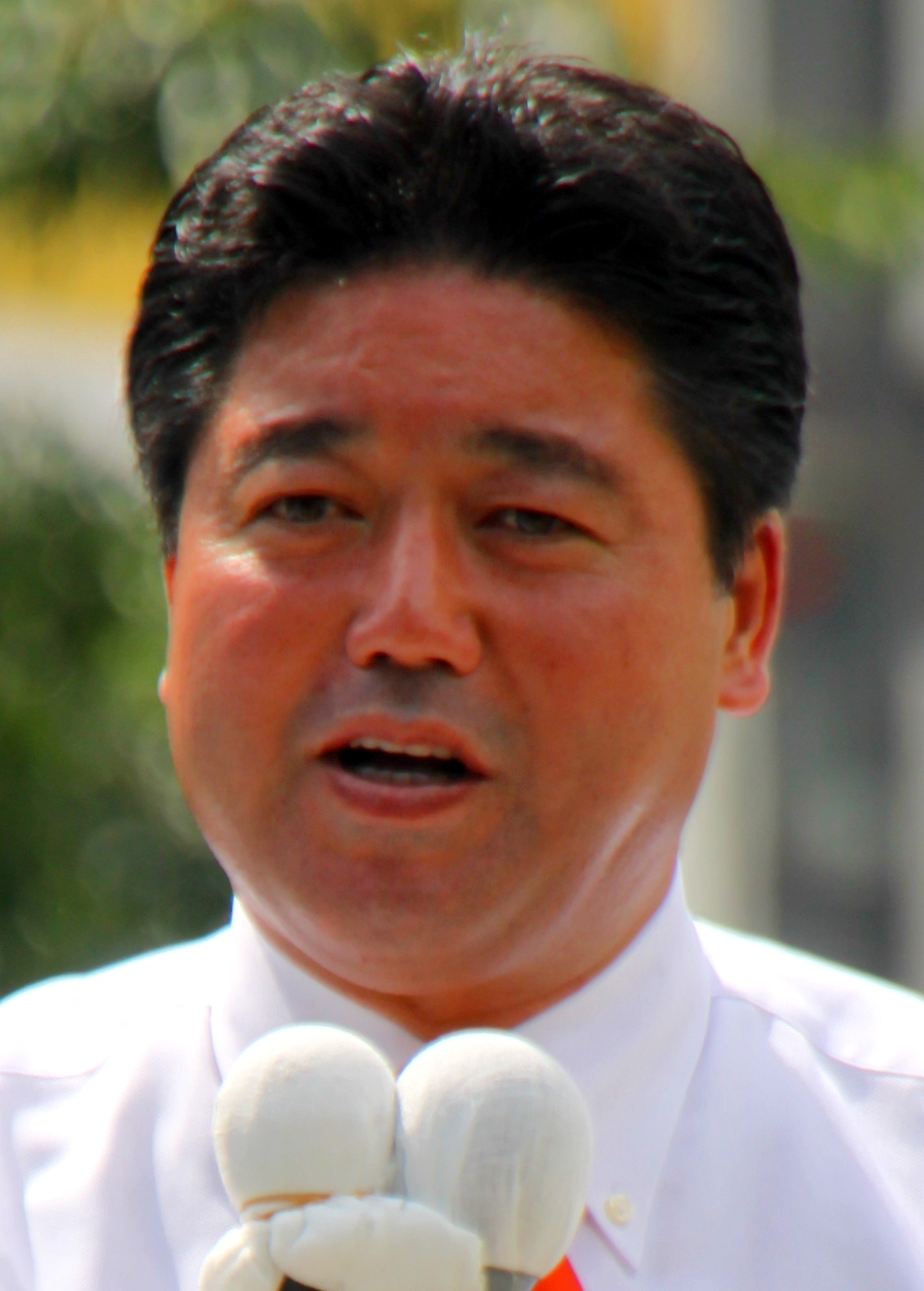
Candidate	Takeshi Onaga	Hirokazu Nakaima	Mikio Shimoji
Party	Independent	Independent	Independent
Popular vote	360,820	261,076	69,447
Percentage	51.61%	37.34%	9.93%
Governor before election
Hirokazu Nakaima
Independent
Elected Governor
Takeshi Onaga
Independent

The 2014 Okinawa gubernatorial election was held on December 9, 2014.

== Results ==
Okinawa gubernatorial election 2014
Party	Candidate	Votes	%	±%
Independent^{1}	Takeshi Onaga	360,820	51.61%	▲5.61
Independent^{2}	Hirokazu Nakaima (incumbent)	261,076	37.34%	▼14.64%
Independent^{3}	Mikio Shimoji	69,447	9.93%	N/A
Independent^{4}	Shōkichi Kina	7,821	1.12%	N/A
Total valid votes		699,164	99.26	
Turnout		704,368	64.13%	▲3.27
Registered electors		1.098.337		
Swing to Okinawa Social Mass from LDP		Swing	14.27	

- 1: supported by JCP, SDPJ, PLP and PLPO etc.
- 2: supported by LDP and PFG
- 3: supported by JIP and PGOR.
- 4: expelled from the DPJ during the election campaign.
