= 2006 Okinawa gubernatorial election =

← 2002	19 November 2006	2010 →
- Turnout: 64.54 ▲7.32
Governor before election
Keiichi Inamine
LDP
Elected Governor
Hirokazu Nakaima
LDP

The 10th Okinawa gubernatorial election was held on November 19, 2006.

== Results ==
Okinawa Gubernatorial election 2006
Party	Candidate	Votes	%	±%
Independent^{1}	Hirokazu Nakaima (仲井真 弘多)	347,303	52.34%	▼12.04
Independent^{2}	Keiko Itokazu (糸数 慶子)	309,985	46.72%	▲11.77
Independent	Chōsuke Yara (屋良 朝助)	6,220	0.94%	n/a
Total valid votes		663.508	99.16%	
Turnout		669.162	64.54%	▲7.32
Registered electors		1.036.743		

- 1: supported by LDP and NKP.
- 2: supported by DPJ, JCP, SDP, PNP and NPN.
