= 1990 Okinawa gubernatorial election =

Gubernatorial election

- November 18, 1990
- Turnout: 76.78 ▲2.67
Governor before election
Junji Nishime
LDP
Elected Governor
Masahide Ōta
JSP

A gubernatorial election was held on November 18, 1990 to elect the Governor of Okinawa (沖縄県, Okinawa-ken), who is the southernmost and westernmost prefecture of Japan.

The election was won by Masahide Ōta, who defeated incumbent Junji Nishime by approximately 30,000 votes. Ōta went on to serve as governor of the prefecture for 8 years.

== Candidates ==
- Junji Nishime, 69, incumbent since 1978, former Representative of the LDP, also backed by the DSP.
- Masahide Ōta, 65, endorsed by the union of the left (Progress and Unity), including the OSMP, JSP, JCP and Komeito.

== Results ==
Okinawa gubernatorial 1990
Party	Candidate	Votes	%	±%
Socialist	Masahide Ōta	330,982	52.38	▲8.40
LDP	Junji Nishime *	300,917	47.62	▼8.40
Total valid votes		631,899		
Turnout			76.78	▲2.67
Registered electors				
Swing to Socialist from LDP		Swing	12.04	
