= Okinawa 4th district =

Legislative district of Japan

Okinawa 4th District
- Parliamentary constituency for the Japanese House of Representatives
- Numbered map of Okinawa Prefecture single-member districts
- Prefecture: Okinawa
- Proportional District: Kyushu
- Electorate: 286,832 (2016)

Current constituency
- Created: 2002
- Seats: One
- Party: Liberal Democratic Party
- Representative: Kōsaburō Nishime
- Created from: Okinawa's 1st and 2nd district
- Municipalities: Miyakojima, Ishigaki, Itoman, Tomigusuku, Nanjō, Tarama, Yaeyama District and parts of Shimajiri District (Haebaru, Yaese and Yonabaru)

Okinawa 4th district is a constituency of the House of Representatives in the Diet of Japan (national legislature). It is located in Okinawa Prefecture and encompasses the cities of Miyakojima, Ishigaki, Itoman, Tomigusuku, Nanjō, the village of Tarama, Yaeyama District and parts of Shimajiri District (Haebaru, Yaese and Yonabaru). The district was formed after the 2002 national electoral district review assigned Okinawa an extra district. Constituency cities and towns in the 1st and 2nd district were reassigned to form the 4th district. As of 2016, 286,832 eligible voters were registered in the district.

The district is currently represented by Kōsaburō Nishime of the Liberal Democratic Party.

== List of representatives ==
Representative	Party	Dates
Kōsaburō Nishime	LDP	2003 – 2009
Chōbin Zukeran	DPJ	2009 – 2012
Kōsaburō Nishime	LDP	2012 – 2014
Toshinobu Nakasato	Ind	2014 – 2017
Kōsaburō Nishime	LDP	2017 –

== Election results ==
2026
Party	Candidate	Votes	%	±%
LDP	Kosaburo Nishime	76,580	49.8	▲6.5
Centrist Reform	Yoshiyuki Toita	37,734	24.6	▼8.9
Reiwa	Hitoshi Yamakawa	20,091	13.1	▼2.3
DPP	Yūji Sakieda	19.230	12.5	
Registered electors		299,366		
Turnout			52.53	▲4.14
LDP hold				

2024
Party	Candidate	Votes	%	±%
LDP	Kōsaburō Nishime (endorsed by Kōmeitō)	61,289	43.37	▼11.53
CDP	Tōru Kinjō	47,248	33.44	▼11.66
Reiwa	Hitoshi Yamakawa (elected by PR)	20,284	14.36	New
Ishin	Yasuhiro Yamakawa	12,481	8.83	New
Registered electors		298,202		
Turnout		141,303	48.39	▼6.66
LDP hold				

2021
Party	Candidate	Votes	%	±%
LDP	Kōsaburō Nishime (endorsed by Kōmeitō)	87,671	54.90	▲4.39
CDP	Tōru Kinjō	72,031	45.10	
Turnout			55.05	▼3.27
LDP hold				

2017
Party	Candidate	Votes	%	±%
LDP	Kōsaburō Nishime (endorsed by Kōmeitō)	82,199	50.51	▲2.48
Independent	Toshinobu Nakasato	75,887	46.63	▼5.34
Happiness Realization	Yasumasa Tomikawa	4,650	2.86	N/A
Majority		6,312	3.88	
Turnout			58.32	▲7.15
LDP gain from Independent		Swing	▲3.91	

2014
Party	Candidate	Votes	%	±%
Independent	Toshinobu Nakasato (endorsed by JCP, SDP, PLP, OSMP, the Greens and Shinfūkai)	71,227	51.97	N/A
LDP	Kōsaburō Nishime (elected by PR, endorsed by Kōmeitō)	65,838	48.03	▼4.18
Majority		5,389	3.94	
Turnout			51.17	▼2.20
Independent gain from LDP		Swing	N/A	

2012 Japanese general election – Okinawa 4th district
Party	Candidate	Votes	%	±%
LDP	Kōsaburō Nishime (endorsed by NKP)	72,912	52.21	▲8.50
Independent	Chōbin Zukeran	33,791	24.20	▼30.51
Restoration	Kōtarō Uomori	12,918	9.25	N/A
JCP	Tamotsu Maesato	11,825	8.47	N/A
Democratic	Nobuhiko Ōshiro	8,193	5.87	N/A
Majority		39,121	28.01	
Turnout		143,214	53.37	▼10.96
LDP gain from Independent		Swing	▲19.51	

2009 Japanese general election – Okinawa 4th district
Party	Candidate	Votes	%	±%
Democratic	Chōbin Zukeran (endorsed by PNP and OSMP)	89,680	54.71	▲24.94
LDP	Kōsaburō Nishime (endorsed by NKP)	71,653	43.71	▼5.33
Happiness Realization	Mitsunari Tomikawa	2,598	1.58	N/A
Majority		18,027	11.00	
Turnout		167,219	64.33	▲6.93
Democratic gain from LDP		Swing	▲16.14	

2005
Party	Candidate	Votes	%	±%
LDP	Kōsaburō Nishime (endorsed by NKP)	68,419	49.04	▼5.43
Democratic	Tadahiro Miyakuni (endorsed by OSMP)	41,532	29.77	▼1.22
JCP	Tamotsu Maesato	15,068	10.80	N/A
People's New	Hiroshi Kinjō	14,491	10.39	N/A
Majority		26,887	19.27	▼4.21
Turnout		142,690	57.40	▼2.46
LDP hold		Swing	▼2.11	

2003
Party	Candidate	Votes	%
LDP	Kōsaburō Nishime (endorsed by NKP)	67,752	54.47
Democratic	Tadahiro Miyakuni (endorsed by SDP and OSMP)	38,550	30.99
Independent	Takeshi Miyazato	18,074	14.53
Majority		29,202	23.48
Turnout		127,745	59.86
LDP win (new seat)			
