= 1978 Okinawa gubernatorial election =

- 10 December 1978
- Turnout: 80.93 ▼1.14
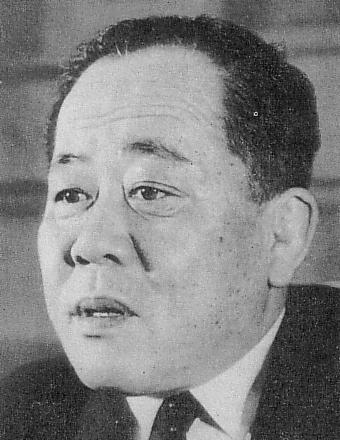

| Nominee | Junji Nishime | Chibana Hideo |
| Party | LDP | Okinawa Social Mass |
| Popular vote | 284,049 | 257,902 |
| Percentage | 52.41% | 47.59% |
Governor before election
Kōichi Taira
OSMP
Elected Governor
Junji Nishime
LDP

A gubernatorial election was held on 10 December 1978 to elect the Governor of Okinawa (沖縄県, Okinawa-ken), who is the southernmost and westernmost prefecture of Japan.

The gubernatorial election was held because Kōichi Taira, who was first elected in the 1976 election, collapsed from a cerebral thrombosis and resigned as governor in November 1978.

== Candidates ==
- Chibana Hideo, 69, endorsed by the union of the left (Progress and Unity), including the OSMP, JSP and JCP.
- Junji Nishime, 57, former Representative of the LDP, also backed by the DSP.

== Results ==
Okinawa gubernatorial 1978
| Party | Candidate | Votes | % | ±% |
|---|---|---|---|---|
| LDP | Junji Nishime | 284,049 | 52.41 | ▲5.61 |
| Okinawa Social Mass | Chibana Hideo | 257,902 | 47.59 | ▼5.61 |
| Total valid votes | | 541,951 | | |
| Turnout | | | 80.93 | ▼1.14 |
| Registered electors | | | | |
| Swing to LDP from Okinawa Social Mass | | Swing | 4.82 | |

- It was the first time since the return of Okinawa that the LDP win the prefecture government.
