= 1986 Okinawa gubernatorial election =

- 16 November 1986
- Turnout: 74.11 ▼7.61
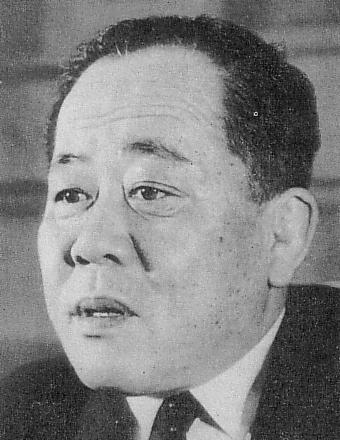

Nominee	Junji Nishime	Mutsumi Kinjo
Party	LDP
Popular vote	321,936	252,744
Percentage	56.02%	43.98%
Governor before election
Junji Nishime
LDP
Elected Governor
Junji Nishime
LDP

A gubernatorial election was held on 14 November 1986 to elect the Governor of Okinawa (沖縄県, Okinawa-ken), who is the southernmost and westernmost prefecture of Japan.

== Candidates ==
- Junji Nishime, 65, incumbent since 1978, former Representative of the LDP, also backed by the DSP.
- Mutsumi Kinjo, endorsed by the union of the left (Progress and Unity), including the OSMP, JSP and JCP.

== Results ==
Okinawa gubernatorial 1986
Party	Candidate	Votes	%	±%
LDP	Junji Nishime *	321,936	56.02	▲4.88
Okinawa Social Mass	Mutsumi Kinjo	252,744	43.98	▼4.88
Total valid votes		574,680		
Turnout			74.11	▼7.61
Registered electors				
LDP hold		Swing	12.04	
