= 1994 Okinawa gubernatorial election =

- November 20, 1994
- Turnout: 62.54 ▼14.24
Governor before election
Masahide Ōta
JSP
Elected Governor
Masahide Ōta
JSP

A gubernatorial election was held on November 20, 1994 to elect the Governor of Okinawa (沖縄県, Okinawa-ken), which is the southernmost and westernmost prefecture of Japan.

Incumbent Masahide Ōta was re-elected for a second term as governor. In 1994, the Okinawans' Attitude Survey conducted by the cabinet office found that public perceptions of Japan's geopolitical security risks had reached an all-time low, dropping to below 50%.

== Candidates ==
- Masahide Ōta, 69, incumbent since 1990, endorsed by OSMP, JSP, JCP, Komeito and JNP.
- Onaga Sukehiro, 58, former vice-governor, backed by LDP.

== Results ==
Okinawa gubernatorial 1994
Party	Candidate	Votes	%	±%
Socialist	Masahide Ōta *	330,601	60.29	▲7.91
LDP	Onaga Sukehiro	217,769	39.71	▼7.91
Total valid votes		548,370		
Turnout			62.54	▼14.24
Registered electors				
Socialist hold		Swing	20.58	
