= Chobin Zukeran =

Japanese politician

Chōbin Zukeran
- 瑞慶覧 長敏

Mayor of Nanjō
- In office 12 February 2018 – 12 February 2022
- Preceded by: Keishun Koja
- Succeeded by: Keishun Koja

Member of the House of Representatives
- In office 30 August 2009 – 16 November 2012
- Preceded by: Kosaburō Nishime
- Succeeded by: Kosaburō Nishime
- Constituency: Okinawa 4th

Personal details
- Born: 24 October 1958 (age 67) Ōzato, Okinawa, USCAR (now Nanjō, Okinawa, Japan)
- Party: SDP (since 2026)
- Other political affiliations: DPJ (2005–2012); Independent (2012-2026)
- Education: University of the Ryukyus; Central Washington University
- Website: Official Twitter account

Chobin Zukeran (瑞慶覧 長敏, Zukeran Chōbin; born 24 October 1958) is a Japanese former politician who was the mayor of Nanjō, Okinawa, and a former member of the House of Representatives of Japan, representing Okinawa 4th district (southern Okinawa Island and the Sakishima Islands).

== Political career ==
Zukeran defeated Kozaburo Nishime (LDP) and was elected to the House of Representatives in the 2009 Japanese general election, representing Okinawa 4th district.

He is an outspoken proponent of the removal of American bases from Okinawa.

On 2 June 2011, against the DPJ's policy, Zukeran abstained from voting for a vote of no confidence in the Kan Cabinet at the plenary session of the House of Representatives. So DPJ's headquarters imposed a strict warning on Zukeran.

In 2012, he was expelled from DPJ in opposition to the bill to increase consumption tax submitted by the Noda Cabinet. He did not join People's Life First, which was formed by Ichirō Ozawa and others who were also expelled from the DPJ, but continued his activities as an Independent politician.

In the 2012 general election, he ran as an independent in Okinawa 4th district, but was defeated by Nishime (LDP) by a large margin and lost the election.

On January 21, 2018, he was elected mayor of Nanjō, defeating incumbent Keishun Koja by 65 votes with the support of Okinawa Governor Takeshi Onaga and All Okinawa. He took office on 12 February.

He was defeated by 1,689 votes in 2022 with Keishun Koja returning to office.

On October 8, 2025, Zukeran announced that he would not run for the next Nanjō mayoral election.

On 21 January 2026, Zukeran announced that he had joined the SDP and declared that he would run as a SDP candidate in Okinawa 2nd district. Okinawa 2nd district is the constituency of Kunio Arakaki, who left SDP due to a line conflict with the leader Mizuho Fukushima and Fukushima led the candidacy of Zukeran as a stabbing to Arakaki. However, the SDP's Okinawa prefectural branch expressed opposition, saying it had not gone through an organizational decision by the prefectural branch. On January 25, two members of the House of Councillors, Yōichi Iha and Sachika Takara, from Okinawa Prefecture, supported by All Okinawa against the relocation of U.S. military bases, met in Naha City and criticized the SDP's support for Zukeran. Meanwhile, after leaving the SDP, Arakaki joined the Centrist Reform Alliance.

In 2026 general election, in addition to LaSalle Ishii, the deputy leader of the SDP, former Prime Minister Yukio Hatoyama rushed to support Zukeran's election campaign and again called for opposition to the relocation of the U.S. military base.

== Electoral history ==
Nanjō mayoral election, 2022
Party	Candidate	Votes	%	±%
Independent	Keishun Koja	13,028	53.47	▲3.61
Independent	Chōbin Zukeran	11,339	46.53	▼3.61
Turnout		24,367	69.12	▲2.20

Nanjō mayoral election, 2018
Party	Candidate	Votes	%	±%
Independent	Chōbin Zukeran	11,429	50.14	N/A
Independent	Keishun Koja	11,364	49.86	▼50.14
Turnout		22,973	66.92	

2012 Japanese general election – Okinawa 4th district
Party	Candidate	Votes	%	±%
LDP	Kōsaburō Nishime (endorsed by NKP)	72,912	52.21	▲8.50
Independent	Chōbin Zukeran	33,791	24.20	▼30.51
Restoration	Kōtarō Uomori	12,918	9.25	N/A
JCP	Tamotsu Maesato	11,825	8.47	N/A
Democratic	Nobuhiko Ōshiro	8,193	5.87	N/A
Majority		39,121	28.01	
Turnout		143,214	53.37	▼10.96
LDP gain from Independent		Swing	▲19.51	

2009 Japanese general election – Okinawa 4th district
Party	Candidate	Votes	%	±%
Democratic	Chōbin Zukeran (endorsed by PNP and OSMP)	89,680	54.71	▲24.94
LDP	Kōsaburō Nishime (endorsed by NKP)	71,653	43.71	▼5.33
Happiness Realization	Mitsunari Tomikawa	2,598	1.58	N/A
Majority		18,027	11.00	
Turnout		167,219	64.33	▲6.93
Democratic gain from LDP		Swing	▲16.14	
