= 1962 Ryukyu Islands legislative election =

Legislative elections were held in the American-controlled Ryukyu Islands in November 1962.

== Results ==
| Party | Seats |
|---|---|
| Democratic Party | 18 |
| Okinawa Social Mass Party | 7 |
| Okinawa Prefectural Headquarters of Japan Socialist Party | 1 |
| Okinawa People's Party | 1 |
| Independents | 2 |
| Total | 29 |

== See also ==
- Government of the Ryukyu Islands
- 1968 Ryukyu Islands legislative election

== Sources ==
- The Europa World Year Book, Volume II, p. 1000
