= 1982 Okinawa gubernatorial election =

- 14 November 1982
- Turnout: 81.72 ▲0.79
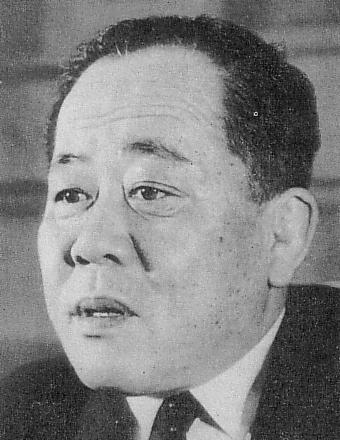

Nominee	Junji Nishime	Kyan Shinei
Party	LDP	Okinawa Social Mass
Popular vote	299,022	285,707
Percentage	51.14%	48.86%
Governor before election
Junji Nishime
LDP
Elected Governor
Junji Nishime
LDP

A gubernatorial election was held on 14 November 1982 to elect the Governor of Okinawa (沖縄県, Okinawa-ken), who is the southernmost and westernmost prefecture of Japan.

== Candidates ==
- Junji Nishime, 61, incumbent since 1978, former Representative of the LDP, also backed by the DSP.
- Kyan Shinei, 70, endorsed by the union of the left (Progress and Unity), including the OSMP, JSP and JCP.

== Results ==
Okinawa gubernatorial 1982
Party	Candidate	Votes	%	±%
LDP	Junji Nishime *	299,022	51.14	▼1.27
Okinawa Social Mass	Kyan Shinei	285,707	48.86	▲1.27
Total valid votes		584,729		
Turnout			81.72	▲0.79
Registered electors				
LDP hold		Swing	2.28	
