= 1976 Okinawa gubernatorial election =

- 13 June 1976
- Turnout: 82.07 ▲5.75
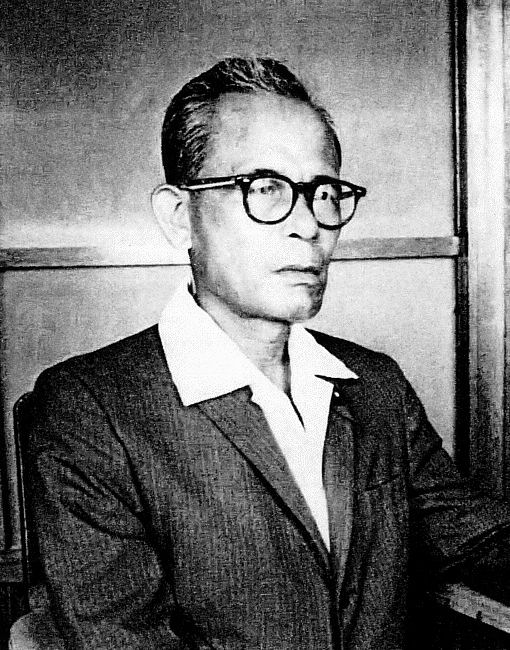

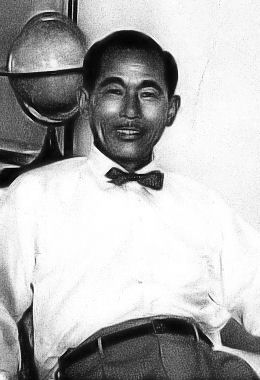
Nominee	Kōichi Taira	Asato Tsumichiyo
Popular vote	270,880	238,283
Percentage	53.20%	46.80%
Governor before election
Chōbyō Yara
OSMP
Elected Governor
Kōichi Taira
OSMP

A gubernatorial election was held on 13 June 1976 to elect the Governor of Okinawa (沖縄県, Okinawa-ken), the prefecture is the southernmost and westernmost prefecture of Japan.

Chōbyō Yara, governor since 1968 is not seeking reelection.

== Candidates ==
- Kōichi Taira, 64, endorsed by the union of the left (Progress and Unity), including the OSMP, JSP and JCP.
- Asato Tsumichiyo, 72, member of the DSP, backed by LDP.

== Results ==
Okinawa gubernatorial 1976
Party	Candidate	Votes	%	±%
Okinawa Social Mass	Kōichi Taira	270,880	53.20	▼5.36
Democratic Socialist	Asato Tsumichiyo	238,283	46.80	▲5.36
Total valid votes		509,163		
Turnout			82.07	▲5.75
Registered electors				
Okinawa Social Mass hold		Swing	6.40	
