= 1998 Okinawa gubernatorial election =

- 15 November 1998
- Turnout: 76.54 ▼14.00
Governor before election
Masahide Ōta
SDP
Elected Governor
Keiichi Inamine
LDP

A gubernatorial election was held on 15 November 1998 to elect the Governor of Okinawa (沖縄県, Okinawa-ken), who is the southernmost and westernmost prefecture of Japan.

== Candidates ==
- Masahide Ōta, 73, incumbent since 1990, endorsed by SDP, OSMP, JCP, LP and NSP.
- Keiichi Inamine, 65, former vice-governor, backed by LDP, New Okinawa and SPP.
- Mitsuo Matayoshi, 54, a conservative Protestant preacher. He led his own party, the World Economic Community Party.

== Results ==
Okinawa gubernatorial 1998
Party	Candidate	Votes	%	±%
LDP	Keiichi Inamine	374,833	52.43	▲12.72
Social Democratic	Masahide Ōta *	337,369	47.19	▼13.10
World Economic Community Party	Mitsuo Matayoshi	2,649	0.37	n/a
Total valid votes		714,851	99.40	
Turnout		719.159	76.54	▼14.00
Registered electors		939.545		
Swing to LDP from Social Democratic		Swing	5.24	
