= Toshinobu Nakasato =

Japanese politician (born 1937)

- 仲里 利信
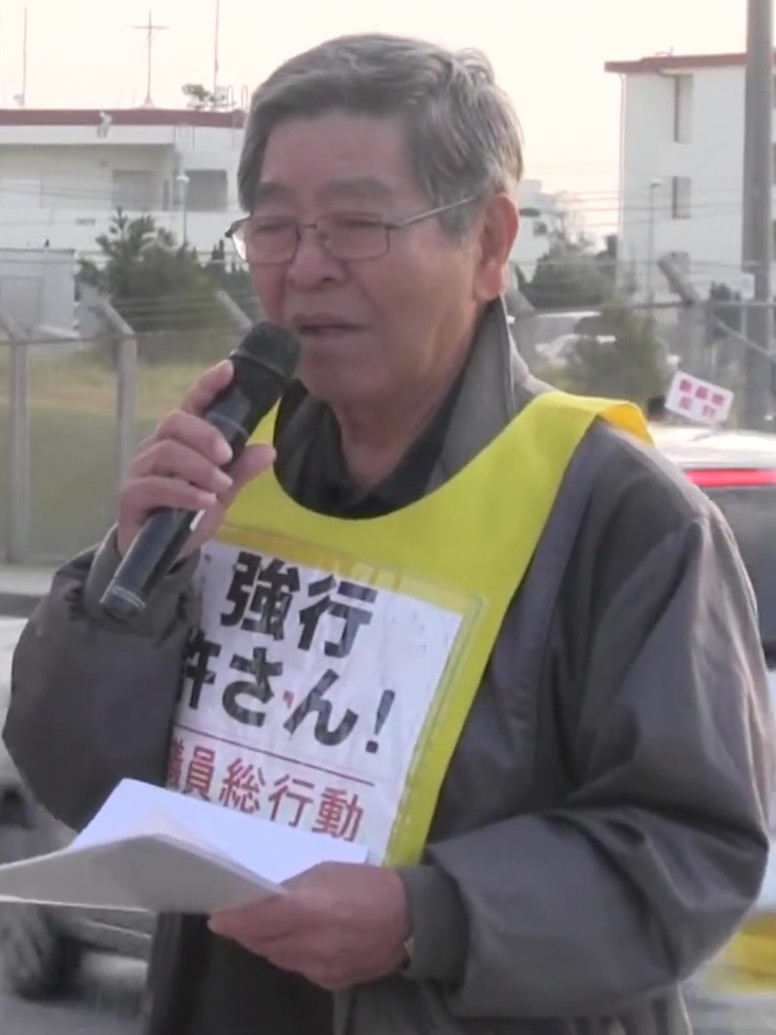
- Nakasato in 2015

Member of the House of Representatives
- In office 14 December 2014 – 28 September 2017
- Preceded by: Kōsaburō Nishime
- Succeeded by: Kōsaburō Nishime
- Constituency: Okinawa 4th

Speaker of the Okinawa Prefectural Assembly
- In office 2006–2008
- Preceded by: Moriyoshi Sotoma
- Succeeded by: Yoshinobu Takamine

Member of the Okinawa Prefectural Assembly
- In office 1992–2008
- Constituency: Shimajiri District

Personal details
- Born: 16 March 1937 (age 89) Haebaru, Okinawa, Japan
- Party: Independent (since 2013)
- Other political affiliations: LDP (1992–1994; 1997–2013); NFP (1994–1997)
- Education: University of the Ryukyus
- Website: Official Twitter account

Toshinobu Nakasato (仲里 利信, Nakasato Toshinobu; born 16 March 1937) is a former Japanese politician who served as a member of the House of Representatives representing Okinawa 4th district (southern Okinawa Island and the Sakishima Islands). Before he entered national politics, Nakasato was a member of the Okinawa Prefectural Assembly for 16 years. He served as the Speaker of the Assembly from 2006 until his retirement from prefectural politics in 2008. He is opposed against the construction of a US base in Yonaguni and the relocation of the Futenma air base within Okinawa Prefecture.
