= 1968 Okinawa gubernatorial election =

- 10 November 1968
- Turnout: 89.11
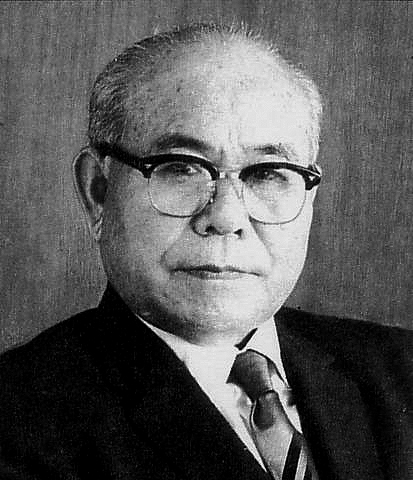

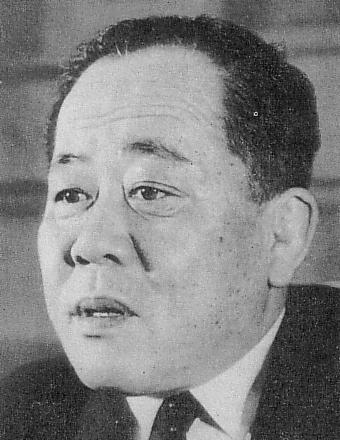
Nominee	Chōbyō Yara	Junji Nishime
Party	OSMP	LDP
Elected Governor
Chōbyō Yara
OSMP

A gubernatorial election was held on 10 November 1968 to elect the first Governor of Okinawa (沖縄県, Okinawa-ken), the prefecture is the southernmost and westernmost prefecture of Japan.

At that time, the islands were administered by the United States Civil Administration of the Ryukyu Islands.

== Candidates ==
- Chōbyō Yara, 65, endorsed by OSMP, JSP, JCP. He wanted a direct return of the island within Japan, and the rapid evacuation of US military bases.
- Junji Nishime, 47, backed by LDP. He wanted a negotiated and gradual return to Japan, and the maintenance of military bases.
- Takehiko Noka, 40, for the Ryukyu independence movement. He did not want a return to Japan, but an independent republic without US bases.

== Results ==
Okinawa gubernatorial 1968
Party	Candidate	Votes	%	±%
Okinawa Social Mass	Chōbyō Yara	237,643	53.51	
LDP	Junji Nishime	206,209	46.43	
Kariyushi Club	Takehiko Noka	279	0.06	
Total valid votes		444,131	96.73	
Turnout		459,136	89.11	
Registered electors		515,246		

== See also ==
- 第1回行政主席通常選挙 (Japanese Wikipedia)
