= 2010 Okinawa gubernatorial election =

Gubernatorial election in Japan

- November 28, 2010
- Registered: 1,068,195
- Turnout: 60.88%
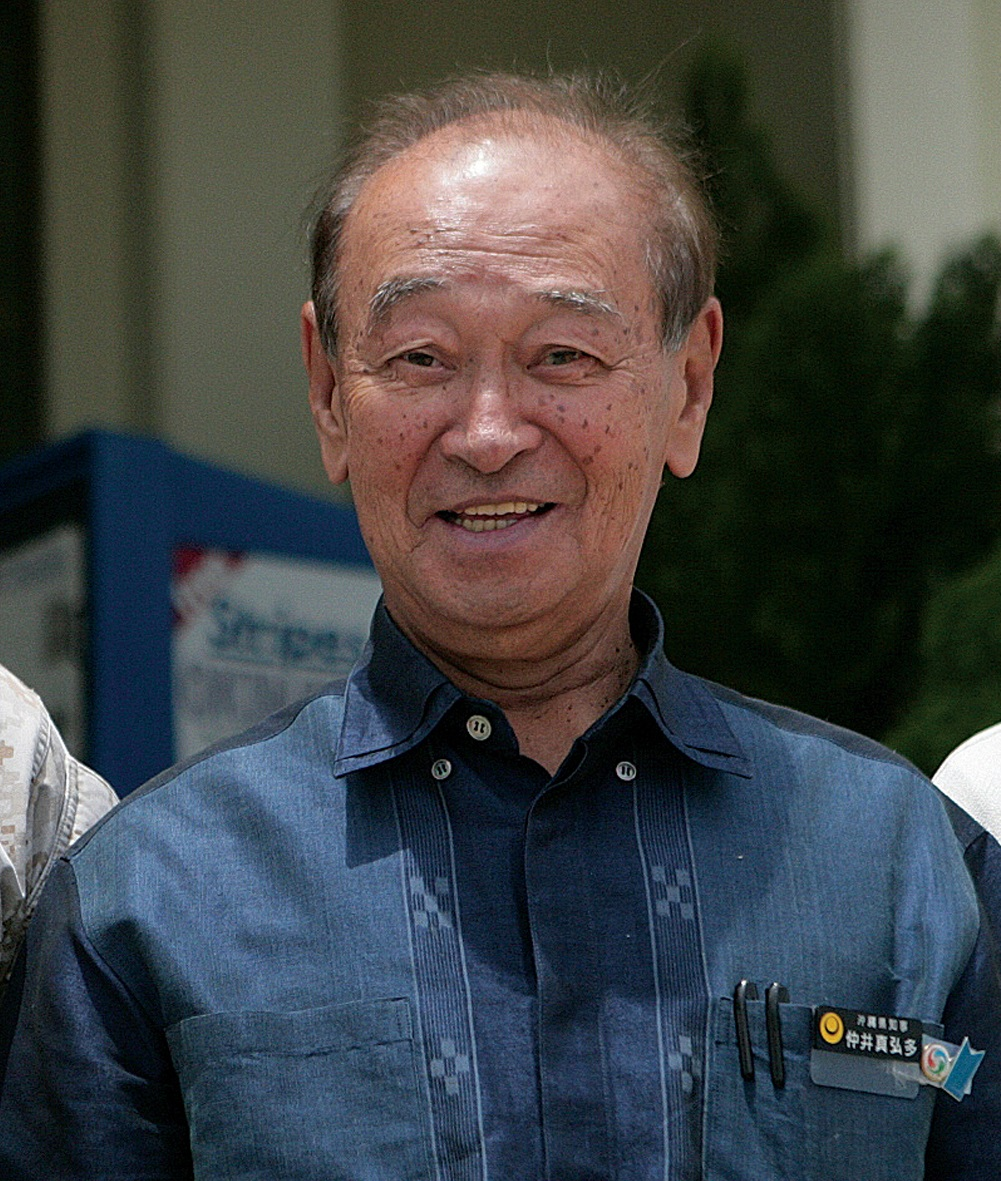

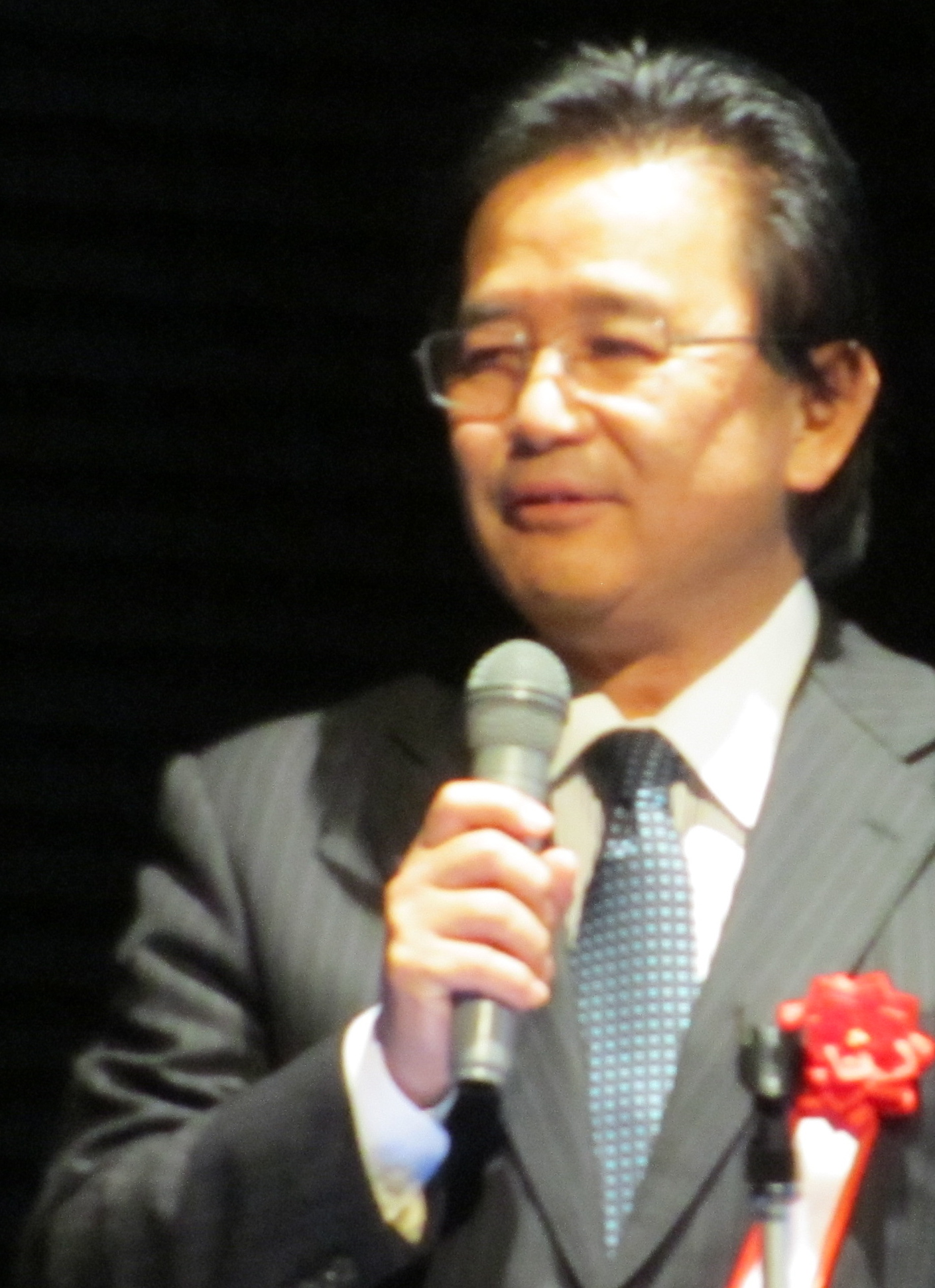
Nominee	Hirokazu Nakaima	Yōichi Iha	Tatsurō Kinjō
Party	Independent	Independent	Happiness Realization Party
Popular vote	335,708	297,082	13,116
Percentage	51.98%	46.00%	2.03%
Supported by	LDP, Kōmeitō, Your Party	SDP, JCP, OSMP	—
Governor before election
Hirokazu Nakaima
Independent
Elected Governor
Hirokazu Nakaima
Independent

The 11th Okinawa gubernatorial election was held on November 28, 2010. The official campaign start began November 11. The 2010 election garnered national attention mostly for the dispute between the central government and local communities in Okinawa over the planned relocation of Marine Corps Air Station Futenma from Ginowan to Henoko in Nago that had also contributed to the resignation of prime minister Yukio Hatoyama in June 2010.

Incumbent governor Hirokazu Nakaima sought reelection as an independent with support of the prefectural LDP and Kōmeitō chapters. In the 2006 election he had narrowly defeated Keiko Itokazu who ran on an "anti-base" platform with support of the Democratic Party of Japan (DPJ) and smaller parties. The DPJ took over the central government in 2009 and could not agree on a candidate for Okinawa governor in 2010: it has to defend the central government's agreements with the United States on base relocation against local opposition that includes base opponents from the DPJ's prefectural chapter. The party officially announced its decision in October 2010, the DPJ had already failed to nominate a candidate in Okinawa for the national House of Councillors election in July 2010.

While Nakaima favors moving the base to outside Okinawa he has repeatedly expressed his willingness to negotiate with the central government on the relocation plans. His likely challenger, former Ginowan mayor Yōichi Iha is strictly opposed to relocating Futenma to a site within the prefecture and proposes to move all USMC facilities to Guam. His candidacy was supported by SDP's and JCP's prefectural chapters and the Okinawa Social Mass Party. A third declared candidate was Tatsurō Kinjō for the Happiness Realization Party who supported the planned move to Henoko.

The vote to elect a successor for Yōichi Iha as mayor of Ginowan was to be held on the same day.
