= Sachio Kuwae =

Japanese politician (1956–2024)

- 桑江朝千夫

Mayor of Okinawa
- In office 12 May 2014 – 9 December 2024
- Preceded by: Mitsuko Tomon
- Succeeded by: Daisuke Hanashiro

Member of the Okinawa Prefectural Assembly
- In office 25 June 2008 – May 2014
- Constituency: Okinawa City

Member of the Okinawa City Council
- In office 1994–2006

Personal details
- Born: 11 January 1956 Nakagami, Okinawa, USCAR
- Died: 9 December 2024 (aged 68) Kagoshima Prefecture, Japan
- Party: Independent
- Education: Nihon University

Sachio Kuwae (Japanese: 桑江朝千夫 Kuwae Sachio; 11 January 1956 – 9 December 2024) was a Japanese politician. An independent, he served in the Okinawa Prefectural Assembly from 2008 to 2014 and was mayor of Okinawa from 2014 to 2024.

Kuwae died of complications from myelodysplastic syndrome in Kagoshima Prefecture, on 9 December 2024, at the age of 68.
