= KJP =

KJP may refer to:

- Karnataka Janata Paksha, a political party in India
- Kerama Airport, identified by the IATA code KJP
- Eastern Pwo language, a Karenic language, identified by the ISO 639 3 code kjp
- Karine Jean-Pierre, 35th White House Press Secretary
- Kusal Janith Perera, Sri Lankan cricketer
