= Kantoku Teruya =

Japanese politician and lawyer (1945–2022)

- 照屋 寛徳

Member of the House of Representatives
- In office 10 November 2003 – 14 October 2021
- Preceded by: Seiji Nakamura
- Succeeded by: Kunio Arakaki
- Constituency: Okinawa 2nd

Member of the House of Councillors
- In office 23 July 1995 – 22 July 2001
- Preceded by: Shin'ei Kyan
- Succeeded by: Junshirō Nishime
- Constituency: Okinawa at-large

Member of the Okinawa Prefectural Assembly
- In office 1988–1995
- Preceded by: Ginowan City

Personal details
- Born: 24 July 1945 Saipan, South Seas Mandate, Japan
- Died: 15 April 2022 (aged 76)
- Party: Social Democratic
- Other political affiliations: Independent (1988–2001)
- Education: University of the Ryukyus
- Website: Official website

Kantoku Teruya (Japanese: 照屋 寛徳, Hepburn: Teruya Kantoku; 24 July 1945 – 15 April 2022) was a member of the Social Democratic Party from Okinawa, who served in the House of Representatives from 2003 to 2021. Teruya was part of the All-Okinawa coalition, which opposed the relocation of a US Marine base to Nago.

Teruya was previously a member of the House of Councillors between 1995 and 2001.
