= Okinawa 1st district =

Legislative district of Japan

Okinawa 1st District
- Parliamentary constituency for the Japanese House of Representatives
- Numbered map of Okinawa Prefecture single-member districts
- Prefecture: Okinawa
- Proportional District: Kyushu
- Electorate: 270,872 (2016)

Current constituency
- Created: 1994
- Seats: One
- Party: Liberal Democratic Party
- Representative: Konosuke Kokuba
- Created from: Okinawa's at-large "medium-sized" district
- Municipalities: Naha and parts of Shimajiri District (Kumejima, Tokashiki, Zamami, Aguni, Tonaki, Minamidaitō, Kitadaitō)

Okinawa 1st district is a constituency of the House of Representatives in the Diet of Japan (national legislature). It is located in Okinawa Prefecture and encompasses the city of Naha and parts of Shimajiri District (Kumejima, Tokashiki, Zamami, Aguni, Tonaki, Minamidaitō, Kitadaitō). As of 2016, 270,872 eligible voters were registered in the district.

The district was represented by Seiken Akamine of the Japanese Communist Party (JCP) from the 2014 general election, when he defeated the incumbent member Kōnosuke Kokuba from the Liberal Democratic Party. Kōnosuke Kokuba regained the district in the 2026 Japanese general election

== Background ==
The 1994 electoral reforms split Okinawa's at-large constituency into four single-district constituencies. In the first three elections after the reforms, Okinawa's 1st district was won by Tai'ichi Shiraho of New Frontier Party and later New Kōmeitō (NKP). The district also features several significant voting blocs. The reliable and sizable Soka Gakkai voting bloc in Naha helped to deliver the district to Shiraho in those elections. The Japanese Communist Party (JCP) has also maintained a relatively large share of vote in the district, banking on the urban voter support and local opposition to the US military bases in Okinawa. Another bloc consists of corporate workers that tend to support the LDP.

In the 2014 general election, the district was won by JCP's Seiken Akamine. Akamine's election was a watershed as it marked the first time a JCP candidate managed to win a single-seat constituency since the 1996 general election. This is also only the third constituency JCP has won since the introduction of parallel voting. The anti-base camp aligned to Okinawa Governor Takeshi Onaga created an alliance behind Akamine to oppose the LDP incumbent at that time, Kōnosuke Kokuba. Kokuba supports the relocation of the US air base in Futenma to Henoko, following the policy of the LDP and Prime Minister Shinzo Abe. The centre-right vote was split further with the candidacy of former representative Mikio Shimoji. A strong anti-base vote and the split in the centre-right camp delivered the district to Akamine, completing JCP's surge in the election.

Akamine retained the district in the 2017 general election despite the JCP losing seats across the country. Akamine managed to keep the anti-base camp solidly behind him, which gave him a slightly larger majority than 2014.

In the 2026 election Kokuba regained the seat.

== List of representatives ==
Representative	Party	Dates	Notes
Tai'ichi Shiraho	NFP	1996 – 1998	
Tai'ichi Shiraho	NKP	1998 – 2005	
Mikio Shimoji	Ind	2005 – 2007	
Mikio Shimoji	PNP	2007 – 2012	
Kōnosuke Kokuba	LDP	2012 – 2014	
Seiken Akamine	JCP	2014 – 2026	
Kōnosuke Kokuba	LDP	2026 –	

== Election results ==
2026
Party	Candidate	Votes	%	±%
LDP	Kōnosuke Kokuba	58,808	42.3	▲10.1
JCP	Seiken Akamine	53,231	38.3	▲0.2
Sanseitō	Tomohisa Wada	13,526	9.7	▲2.6
Ishin	Yasuhiro Yamakawa	11,521	8.3	New
Independent	Maho Nakajima	2,011	1.4	New
Turnout			55.05	▲4.29
LDP gain from JCP		Swing	▲9.9	

2024
Party	Candidate	Votes	%	±%
JCP	Seiken Akamine	49,838	38.09	▼4.08
LDP	Kōnosuke Kokuba (elected by PR, endorsed by Kōmeitō)	42,104	32.18	▼5.20
Independent	Mikio Shimoji	29,615	22.64	▲2.19
Sanseitō	Tomohisa Wada	9,271	7.09	New
Turnout			50.76	▼5.13
JCP hold		Swing		

2021
Party	Candidate	Votes	%	±%
JCP	Seiken Akamine	61,519	42.17	▲2.27
LDP	Kōnosuke Kokuba (elected by PR, endorsed by Kōmeitō)	54,532	37.38	▲1.52
Independent	Mikio Shimoji	29,827	20.45	▼2.08
Turnout			55.89	▼1.47
JCP hold		Swing	▲0.37	

2017
Party	Candidate	Votes	%	±%
JCP	Seiken Akamine	60,605	39.90	▲0.08
LDP	Kōnosuke Kokuba (elected by PR, endorsed by Kōmeitō)	54,468	35.86	▼0.73
Ishin	Mikio Shimoji (elected by PR, endorsed by Kibō)	34,215	22.53	▼1.06
Happiness Realization	Reiko Shimoji	2,594	1.71	N/A
Majority		6,137	4.04	
Turnout			57.36	▲0.99
JCP hold		Swing	▲0.41	

2014
Party	Candidate	Votes	%	±%
JCP	Seiken Akamine (endorsed by SDP, PLP, OSMP, the Greens and Shinfūkai)	57,935	39.82	▲21.43
LDP	Kōnosuke Kokuba (elected by PR, endorsed by Kōmeitō)	53,241	36.59	▼6.48
Ishin	Mikio Shimoji (elected by PR, endorsed by PGOR)	34,328	23.59	▼7.35
Majority		4,694	3.33	
Turnout			56.37	
JCP gain from LDP		Swing	▲13.97	

2012
Party	Candidate	Votes	%	±%
LDP	Kōnosuke Kokuba (endorsed by NKP)	65,233	43.07	▲5.07
People's New	Mikio Shimoji (endorsed by DPJ)	46,865	30.94	▼15.58
JCP	Seiken Akamine (elected by PR, endorsed by OSMP)	27,856	18.39	▲4.09
Restoration	Kunihiro Yasuda (endorsed by YP)	11,514	7.60	N/A
Majority		18,368	12.13	
Turnout				
LDP gain from People's New		Swing	▲10.33	

2009
Party	Candidate	Votes	%	±%
People's New	Mikio Shimoji (endorsed by DPJ)	77,152	46.52	▲2.75
LDP	Kōnosuke Kokuba (endorsed by NKP)	63,017	38.00	▼2.84
JCP	Hisako Hokama (endorsed by OSMP)	23,715	14.30	▲0.31
Happiness Realization	Naruki Taira	1,958	1.18	
Majority		14,135	8.52	
People's New hold		Swing	▲2.80	

2005
Party	Candidate	Votes	%	±%
Independent	Mikio Shimoji (endorsed by DPJ and OSMP)	72,384	43.77	
New Kōmeitō	Tai'ichi Shiraho (endorsed by LDP)	67,540	40.84	
JCP	Seiken Akamine (elected by PR, endorsed by OSMP)	23,123	13.99	
Independent	Hideyuki Uehara	2,307	1.40	

2003
Party	Candidate	Votes	%	±%
New Kōmeitō	Tai'ichi Shiraho (endorsed by LDP and NCP)	58,330	37.0	
Independent	Mikio Shimoji	52,374	33.3	
Democratic	Noboru Shimajiri (endorsed by SDP and OSMP)	27,209	17.3	
JCP	Seiken Akamine (elected by PR, endorsed by OSMP)	19,528	12.4	

2000
Party	Candidate	Votes	%	±%
New Kōmeitō	Tai'ichi Shiraho (endorsed by LDP and NCP)	86,255	52.6	
JCP	Seiken Akamine (elected by PR, endorsed by OSMP)	50,709	30.9	
Liberal League	Kiyotaka Maeda (endorsed by SDP)	27,168	16.6	

1996
Party	Candidate	Votes	%	±%
New Frontier	Tai'ichi Shiraho (endorsed by SDP)	52,975	30.2	
JCP	Saneyoshi Furuken (elected by PR, endorsed by OSMP)	47,379	27.0	
LDP	Mikio Shimoji (elected by PR)	44,488	25.4	
Liberal League	Shunshirō Nishime	23,238	13.3	
NP-Sakigake	Noboru Shimajiri (endorsed by DPJ)	7,223	4.1	
