= 1968 Ryukyu Islands legislative election =

Legislative elections were held in the American-controlled Ryukyu Islands in November 1968.

== Results ==
Party	Seats
Okinawa Liberal Democratic Party	18
Okinawa Social Mass Party	8
Okinawa People's Party	3
Okinawa Prefectural Headquarters of Japan Socialist Party	2
Independents	1
Total	32

== See also ==
- Government of the Ryukyu Islands
- 1962 Ryukyu Islands legislative election

== Sources ==
- The Europa World Year Book 1970, Volume II, p. 1252
