= Junji Nishime =

Japanese politician

- 西銘 順治
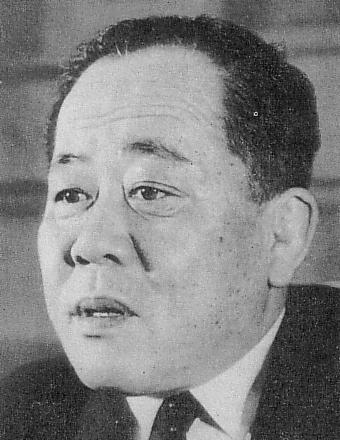

Member of the House of Representatives
- In office 19 July 1993 – 27 September 1996
- Preceded by: Eiichi Tamaki
- Succeeded by: Constituency abolished
- Constituency: Okinawa at-large
- In office 16 November 1970 – 9 November 1978
- Preceded by: Constituency established
- Succeeded by: Shinjun Ōshiro
- Constituency: Okinawa at-large

Governor of Okinawa Prefecture
- In office 10 December 1978 – 9 December 1990
- Monarchs: Hirohito; Akihito
- Preceded by: Koichi Taira; Takemori Nijima (acting)
- Succeeded by: Masahide Ōta

Mayor of Naha
- In office January 1962 – October 1968
- Preceded by: Kenji Saichi
- Succeeded by: Ryōmatsu Taira

Personal details
- Born: 5 November 1921 Yonaguni, Okinawa, Japan
- Died: 10 November 2001 (aged 80) Naha, Okinawa, Japan
- Party: Liberal Democratic
- Children: Kosaburo Nishime
- Education: Tokyo Imperial University

Military service
- Allegiance: Empire of Japan
- Branch/service: Imperial Japanese Navy
- Rank: Sub-lieutenant

Junji Nishime (西銘 順治, Nishime Junji; 5 November 1921 – 10 November 2001) was a Japanese politician who served as the 4th Governor of Okinawa from 1978 until 1990 and mayor of Naha, the capital of Okinawa. He studied and graduated at the University of Tokyo.

== Early life ==
Nishime was born in Yonaguni and spent part of his childhood in Palau while it was under Japanese administration. He graduated from the Faculty of Law at Tokyo Imperial University in 1948, and briefly joined the Ministry of Foreign Affairs, but left after several months to return to Okinawa, where he participated in the foundation of the Okinawa Herald newspaper.

== Political career ==
Nishime was a co-founder of the Okinawa Social Mass Party in 1950, and was elected to the Ryukyu Islands Legislature in 1954. He left the party in 1958 to work for the Ryukyu Islands Government.

=== Mayor of Naha (1962–1968) ===
Nishime was elected as Mayor of Naha in 1962 with the support of the Liberal Democratic Party. He became chairman of the Okinawa LDP in 1968 and unsuccessfully ran against Chobyo Yara in the 1968 gubernatorial election, despite being tacitly supported by the Japanese and U.S. governments.

=== House of Representatives (1970–1978) ===
Nishime won a seat in the Japanese House of Representatives in Okinawa's first postwar Diet election, held in 1970 in preparation for Okinawa's reversion to Japanese sovereignty in 1972. He served as a parliamentary vice-minister for Okinawan affairs under Prime Minister Kakuei Tanaka from 1973.

=== Governor of Okinawa (1978–1990) ===
During his third Diet term, Nishime ran in the 1978 Okinawa gubernatorial election with the support of the LDP and Democratic Socialist Party. His victory was the first by a conservative gubernatorial candidate in postwar Okinawa. He served for three terms, a total of 12 years, setting the current record for governors of Okinawa.

He attempted to win a fourth term in the 1990 Okinawa gubernatorial election, but was defeated by Masahide Ota.

=== House of Representatives (1993–1996) ===
Nishime returned to the Diet in the 1993 general election, but announced his retirement from politics for health reasons in 1995 and did not stand for re-election in the 1996 general election.

== Personal life ==
Two of his sons became politicians: Junshiro Nishime, a one-term member of the Senate, and Kosaburo Nishime, an eight-term member of the House of Representatives.
