= Kamejiro Senaga =

Japanese politician

- 瀬長 亀次郎
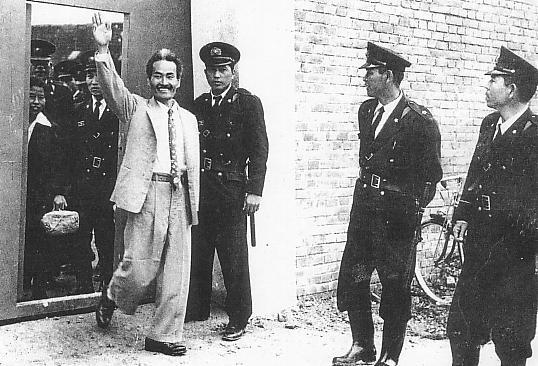
- Senaga being released from prison

Member of the House of Representatives
- In office 16 November 1970 – 24 January 1990
- Preceded by: Constituency established
- Succeeded by: Saneyoshi Furuken
- Constituency: Okinawa at-large

Mayor of Naha
- In office January 1957 – November 1957
- Preceded by: Jugo Tōma
- Succeeded by: Tadashi Toei

Personal details
- Born: 10 June 1907 Tomigusuku, Okinawa, Japan
- Died: 5 October 2001 (aged 94) Naha, Okinawa, Japan
- Party: Communist
- Other political affiliations: Okinawa People's Party (1947–1973)
- Spouse: Fumi Sensei
- Education: Kagoshima University

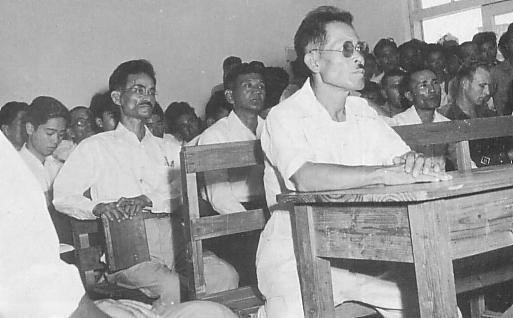
Kamejiro Senaga (at left, holding book)

Kamejiro Senaga (Japanese: 瀬長 亀次郎, Hepburn: Senaga Kamejirō; 10 June 1907 – 5 October 2001) was a politician, journalist, also Mayor of Naha city. Senaga was an outspoken critic of American oppression on Okinawa and was imprisoned by American military authorities for sheltering Communists. He was a mayor in Naha and a prominent political figure during the American occupation of Okinawa. However, he was removed when military authorities arbitrarily changed Okinawan election ordinances. Senaga was a strong advocate for the reversion of Okinawa, which was initially opposed by the American military. Later, he served as a representative of the Japanese Communist Party in the Diet, in the House of Representatives, before retiring from politics in 1990.
