= Seiken Akamine =

Japanese politician

- 赤嶺 政賢
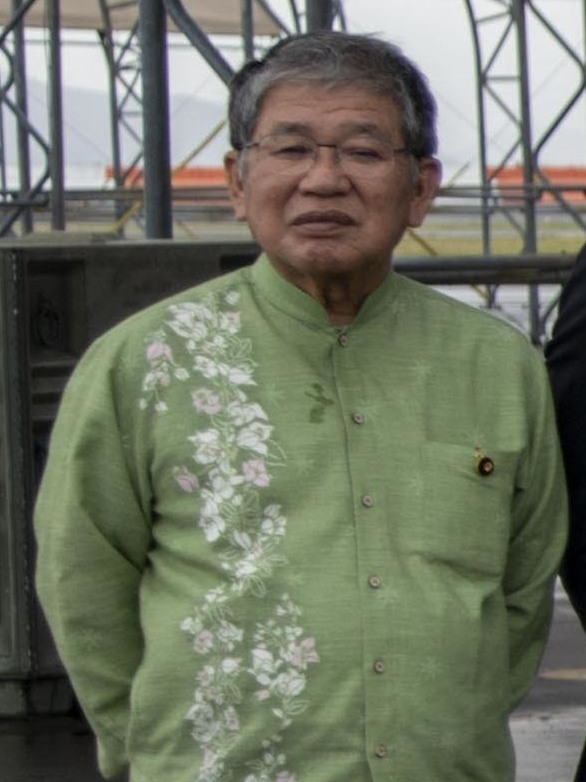
- Akamine in 2019

Member of the House of Representatives
- In office 25 June 2000 – 23 January 2026
- Preceded by: Multi-member district
- Succeeded by: Konosuke Kokuba
- Constituency: Kyushu PR (2000–2014); Okinawa 1st (2014–2026)

Member of the Naha City Assembly
- In office 1985–1997

Personal details
- Born: 18 December 1947 (age 78) Naha, USCAR
- Party: Communist
- Education: Tokyo University of Education
- Website: Official website

Seiken Akamine (赤嶺 政賢, Akamine Seiken; born 18 December 1947) is a Japanese politician of the Japanese Communist Party, who served as a member of the House of Representatives in the Diet (national legislature).

A native of Naha, Okinawa and graduate of the Tokyo University of Education, he taught at high schools. He was elected to the first of his three terms in the Naha City Assembly in 1985 and then to the House of Representatives for the first time in 2000.

In the 2014 Japanese general elections, he won Okinawa's 1st district. The election saw significant gains for the Japanese Communist Party, which raised its seat total from 8 to 21. Akamine's victory was JCP's first single-seat constituency victory in 18 years. His victory was part of a wave against the ruling Liberal Democratic Party in Okinawa caused by local anger over by a joint US-Japan decision to relocate a marine base to a residential area. LDP candidates lost all four Okinawan seats despite the party winning nationwide. In the 2017 general election, Akamine retained his seat.

In the 2026 Japanese general election he lost the district to the previous LDP representative Kōnosuke Kokuba.
