= Hirokazu Nakaima =

Japanese politician

- 仲井眞 弘多
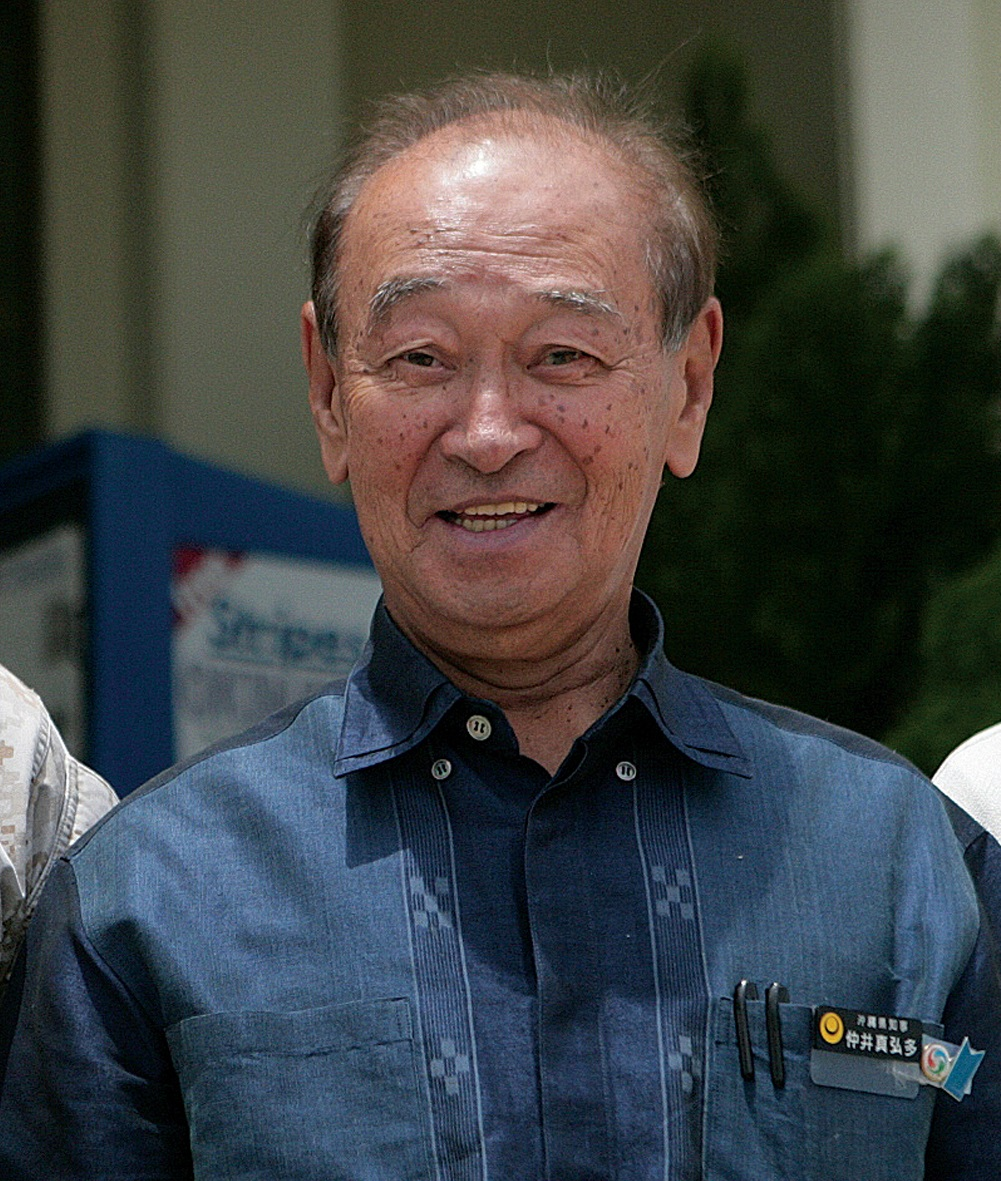
- Nakaima in 2011

Governor of Okinawa Prefecture
- In office 10 December 2006 – 10 December 2014
- Monarch: Akihito
- Preceded by: Keiichi Inamine
- Succeeded by: Takeshi Onaga

Vice Governor of Okinawa Prefecture
- In office 23 December 1990 – 14 June 1993 Serving with Hiroko Shō
- Governor: Masahide Ōta
- Preceded by: Sukehiro Onaga
- Succeeded by: Masanori Yoshimoto

Personal details
- Born: 19 August 1939 (age 87) Higashinari, Osaka, Japan
- Education: University of Tokyo

Hirokazu Nakaima (仲井眞 弘多, Nakaima Hirokazu; born 19 August 1939) is a Japanese bureaucrat, business leader, and politician. He was governor of Okinawa Prefecture from 2006 to 2014.

== Biography ==
Nakaima was born on 19 August 1939, in Higashinari Ward of Osaka. He is of Ryukyuan descent. Nakaima is descended from a Chinese family with the surname of Cai, one of the 36 Han Chinese Kumemura families who moved to Okinawa in 1392. In 1945 during World War II, his family escaped from the air raids in Osaka and evacuated to Meiji, Minamiamabe District, Oita Prefecture. In 1946 he returned to his parents' hometown of Naha, Okinawa. There he graduated from Kainan Elementary School, Uenoyama Junior High School, and Naha Senior High School. Nakaima excelled in math and science, earning grades that placed him at the top of his class.

Pursuing a dream of becoming an automobile designer, Nakaima sat for an exam to apply for the Government-funded/Self-funded Okinawa Student Program, a system established between the United States Military Government in Okinawa and the Japanese Government to allow students from Okinawa to attend university in mainland Japan. Nakaima passed the exam and matriculated at the University of Tokyo, where he graduated with a Bachelor of Engineering degree in 1961.

Directly after graduating in 1961, Nakaima joined the Ministry of International Trade and Industry (MITI). In the 1980s, Nakaima served as the director general of the Commerce and Industry Department at the Okinawa General Bureau and later as the deputy director-general for technology affairs at MITI's Agency of Industrial Science and Technology.

In 1987, Nakaima took a senior general manager position with the Okinawa Electric Power Company. In 1990, he left the company to become a vice governor in the administration of Okinawa Governor Masahide Ota. Nakaima returned to the Okinawa Electric Power Company in 1995, serving as the company's president and later chairman of the board of directors.

In 2006 the Liberal Democratic Party and the New Kōmeitō gave him backing for his run in the Okinawa gubernatorial election on 19 November. In the election, Nakaima defeated Keiko Itokazu, who received the recommendation of five opposition parties. Nakaima assumed the office of Governor on 10 December 2006. He was re-elected for a second term on 28 November 2010, defeating Yoichi Iha.

In December 2013, Nakaima approved a landfill proposal by the Japanese government to permit the construction of new military facilities in Henoko to replace Marine Corps Air Station Futenma. The decision came two days after Tokyo earmarked 348 billion yen for Okinawa's economic development and despite earlier campaign promises by Nakaima to move the base outside of the prefecture altogether.

On 10 May 2014, Nakaima sent his congratulations to the openly revisionist lobby Nippon Kaigi for a sport event it held in Okinawa.

Nakaima lost his bid for a second re-election on 16 November 2014, losing to former Naha mayor Takeshi Onaga. Onaga opposed the plan to move the Marine Corps Air Station Futenma base to Henoko Bay, while Nakaima supported it.

== See also ==
- University of Tokyo
- Ministry of International Trade and Industry
- Masahide Ota

Political offices
Preceded by Keiichi Inamine	Governor of Okinawa; December 2006 – December 2014	Succeeded by Takeshi Onaga
