= Kunio Arakaki =

Japanese politician (born 1956)

- 新垣 邦男
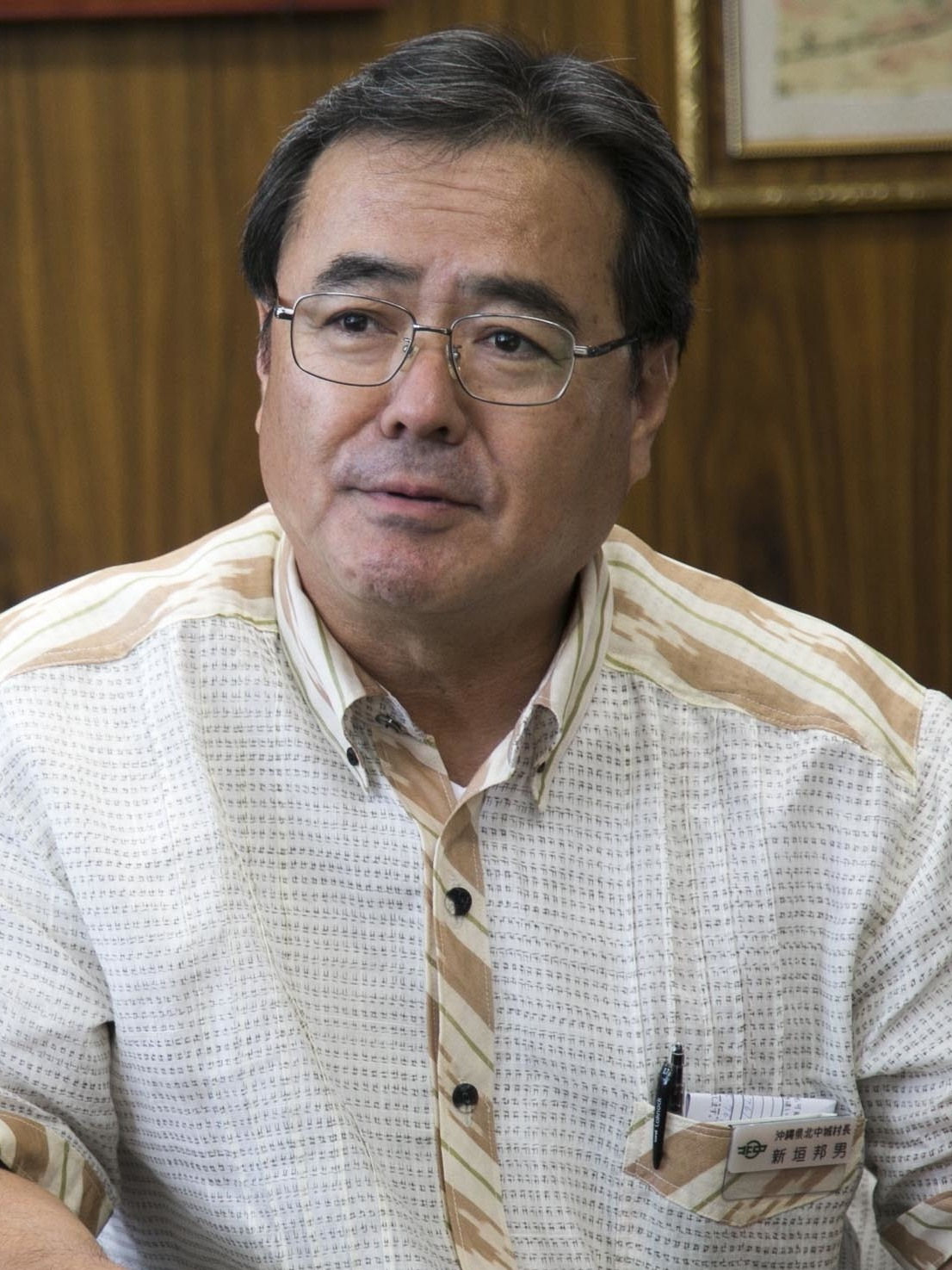
- Arakaki in 2016

Member of the House of Representatives
- In office 3 November 2021 – 23 January 2026
- Preceded by: Kantoku Teruya
- Succeeded by: Masahisa Miyazaki
- Constituency: Okinawa 2nd

Mayor of Kitanakagusuku
- In office 22 December 2004 – 21 December 2020
- Preceded by: Kaoru Kyan
- Succeeded by: Takanori Higa

Personal details
- Born: 19 June 1956 (age 70) Naha, Okinawa, USCAR
- Party: CRA (since 2026)
- Other political affiliations: Independent (until 2020; 2025–2026); SDP (2020–2025)
- Education: Nihon University
- Occupation: Jurist • Politician

Kunio Arakaki (born 19 June 1956) is a Japanese politician and karate practitioner. He was a member of the House of Representatives, belonging to the Centrist Reform Alliance. He previously was a member of the Social Democratic Party.

He served as mayor of Kitanakagusuku in Okinawa Prefecture, between 2004 and 2020.
