= Kosaburo Nishime =

Japanese politician

- 西銘 恒三郎
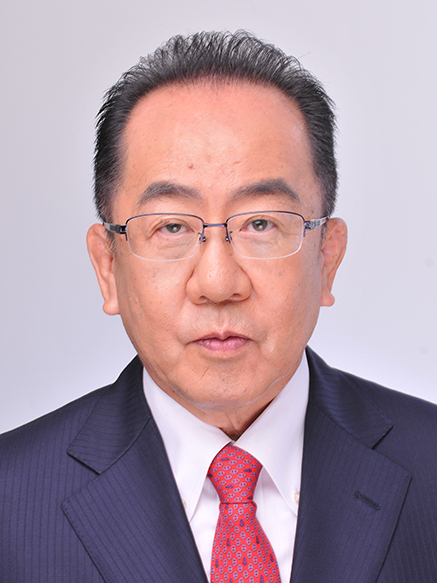
- Official portrait, 2021

Minister of Reconstruction
- In office 4 October 2021 – August 10, 2022
- Prime Minister: Fumio Kishida
- Preceded by: Katsuei Hirasawa
- Succeeded by: Kenya Akiba

Member of the House of Representatives
- Incumbent
- Assumed office 19 December 2012
- Preceded by: Chobin Zukeran
- Constituency: Okinawa 4th (2012–2014); Kyushu PR (2014–2017); Okinawa 4th (2017–present)
- In office 10 November 2003 – 21 July 2009
- Preceded by: Constituency established
- Succeeded by: Chobin Zukeran
- Constituency: Okinawa 4th

Member of the Okinawa Prefectural Assembly
- In office 1988–2003
- Constituency: Naha City

Personal details
- Born: 7 August 1954 (age 72) Chinen, Okinawa, Japan
- Party: Liberal Democratic
- Parent: Junji Nishime (father)
- Education: Sophia University

Kosaburo Nishime (西銘 恒三郎, Nishime Kōsaburō; born 7 August 1954), is a Japanese politician who has served in the House of Representatives representing Okinawa since 2012. He is a member of the Liberal Democratic Party.

== Early life ==
Nishime is a native of Chinen, Okinawa, and graduated from Sophia University.

== Political career ==
Nishime was elected to the Okinawa Prefectural Assembly for the first time in 1988 and to the Diet for the first time in 2003.

He has represented Okinawa since 2012, holding the Okinawa 4th district, except for the period from 2014-2017 when he was a Kyushu Proportional Representation member.

Nishime served as Minister of Reconstruction from October 2021 to August 2022.

== Family ==
His father is Junji Nishime, former Governor of Okinawa Prefecture, and his brother is Junshiro Nishime, a former member of the House of Councilors in the Diet.
