= Okinawa 2nd district =

Legislative district of Japan

Okinawa 2nd District
- Parliamentary constituency for the Japanese House of Representatives
- Numbered map of Okinawa Prefecture single-member districts
- Prefecture: Okinawa
- Proportional District: Kyushu
- Electorate: 294,848 (2021)

Current constituency
- Created: 1994
- Seats: One
- Party: LDP
- Representative: Masahisa Miyazaki
- Created from: Okinawa's at-large "medium-sized" district
- Municipalities: Urasoe, Ginowan and Nakagami District

Okinawa 2nd district is a constituency of the House of Representatives in the Diet of Japan (national legislature). It is located in Okinawa Prefecture and encompasses the cities of Urasoe and Ginowan, and Nakagami District. As of 2016, 288,070 eligible voters were registered in the district.

== Background ==
The district was considered a stronghold for veteran Social Democrat Kantoku Teruya, who held the district continuously from 2003 to 2021. Such is the strength of the SDP vote in the district that during the LDP landslides in 2005 and 2012, Teruya still managed to hold the district comfortably. The significant presence of US military bases in Ginowan is regarded as a major factor contributing to the wide aversion of the local population to voting LDP candidates, who are typically pro-base.

Okinawa-2nd is one of the few districts that the JCP regularly skips from contesting. The party continuously endorsed Teruya in each election from 2009. Other centre-left parties also generally refrained from contesting the district and regularly backed Teruya in general elections.

Teruya retired before the 2021 elections but Kunio Arakaki, the former mayor of Kitanakagusuku, managed to hold the seat for the SDP. When Arakaki left the SDP in November of 2025, the party lost its last single-seat constituency in the Diet.

== List of representatives ==
Representative	Party	Dates
Seiji Nakamura	NFP	1996
Seiji Nakamura	LDP	1996 – 2003
Kantoku Teruya	SDP	2003 – 2021
Kunio Arakaki	SDP	2021 – 2026
Masahisa Miyazaki	LDP	2026 –

== Election results ==
2026
Party	Candidate	Votes	%	±%
LDP	Masahisa Miyazaki	71,071	43.2	▲10.7
Centrist Reform	Kunio Arakaki	57,500	35.0	
Sanseitō	Yūri Yoshida	19,333	11.8	▲3.7
Social Democratic	Chōbin Zukeran	14,311	8.7	▼33.3
Independent	Takashi Hika	2,140	1.3	▼0.3
Registered electors		296,430		
Turnout			56.72	▲6.29
LDP gain from Social Democratic				

2024
Party	Candidate	Votes	%	±%
Social Democratic	Kunio Arakaki	61,216	42.03	▼5.36
LDP	Masahisa Miyazaki (elected by PR, endorsed by Kōmeitō)	47,272	32.46	▼8.50
Ishin	Noboru Akamine	22,959	15.76	▲6.05
Sanseitō	Asami Konno	11,813	8.11	New
Independent	Takashi Hika	2,374	1.63	New
Turnout		145,634	50.43	▼4.39
Social Democratic hold				

2021
Party	Candidate	Votes	%	±%
Social Democratic	Kunio Arakaki	74,665	47.39	▼11.55
LDP	Masahisa Miyazaki (elected by PR, endorsed by Kōmeitō)	64,542	40.96	▼0.10
Ishin	Yasuhiro Yamakawa	15,296	9.71	
Anti-NHK	Yukiya Nakamura	3,053	1.94	
Turnout			54.82	▼1.24
Social Democratic hold				

2017
Party	Candidate	Votes	%	±%
Social Democratic	Kantoku Teruya	92,143	58.94	▼3.25
LDP	Masahisa Miyazaki (endorsed by Kōmeitō)	64,193	41.06	▲3.25
Majority		27,950	17.88	
Turnout			56.06	▲4.48
Social Democratic hold		Swing	▼3.25	

2014
Party	Candidate	Votes	%	±%
Social Democratic	Kantoku Teruya (endorsed by JCP, PLP, OSMP, the Greens and Shinfūkai)	85,781	62.19	▲13.18
LDP	Masahisa Miyazaki (elected by PR, endorsed by Kōmeitō)	52,156	37.81	▲0.89
Majority		33,625	34.38	
Turnout			51.58	
Social Democratic hold		Swing	▲6.15	

2012
Party	Candidate	Votes	%	±%
Social Democratic	Kantoku Teruya	73,498	49.01	▼12.09
LDP	Masahisa Miyazaki (elected by PR, endorsed by NKP)	55,373	36.92	▲3.45
Restoration	Toshinori Kinjō (endorsed by YP)	19,551	13.04	N/A
Independent	Baku Nagai	1,556	1.04	N/A
Majority		18,125	12.09	
Turnout				
Social Democratic hold		Swing	▼7.77	

2009
Party	Candidate	Votes	%	±%
Social Democratic	Kantoku Teruya (endorsed by OSMP)	101,820	61.10	▲14.40
LDP	Osamu Ashitomi (endorsed by NKP)	60,773	36.47	▼2.87
Happiness Realization	Noboru Tomikawa	4,044	2.43	N/A
Majority		41,047	24.67	
Social Democratic hold		Swing	▲8.64	

2005
Party	Candidate	Votes	%	±%
Social Democratic	Kantoku Teruya (endorsed by OSMP)	71,861	46.70	
LDP	Osamu Ashitomi (elected by PR, endorsed by NKP)	60,540	39.34	
Independent	Noboru Shimajiri	14,617	9.50	
JCP	Morinobu Nishihira	6,875	4.47	
Social Democratic hold		Swing		

2003
Party	Candidate	Votes	%	±%
Social Democratic	Kantoku Teruya (endorsed by DPJ and OSMP)	74,123	55.4	
LDP	Yoshiji Uehara (endorsed by NKP and NCP)	47,759	35.7	
JCP	Norio Maemiya	6,560	4.9	
Independent	Kunio Kinjō	5,297	4.0	
Social Democratic gain from LDP		Swing		

2000
Party	Candidate	Votes	%	±%
LDP	Seiji Nakamura (endorsed by NKP and NCP)	88,544	49.3	
Democratic	Noboru Shimajiri	30,970	17.3	
Liberal League	Hiroshi Kinjō (endorsed by SDP)	30,946	17.2	
JCP	Tsuneo Nakanishi	29,039	16.2	

1996
Party	Candidate	Votes	%	±%
New Frontier	Seiji Nakamura	66,421	41.3	
Okinawa Social Mass	Aichi Nakamoto (endorsed by JCP and NSP)	51,689	32.2	
Liberal League	Hiroshi Kinjō	18,696	11.6	
LDP	Kunio Kinjō	18,142	11.3	
NP-Sakigake	Jinichirō Asato (endorsed by DPJ)	5,801	3.6	
