= Konosuke Kokuba =

Japanese politician (born 1973)

- 國場 幸之助
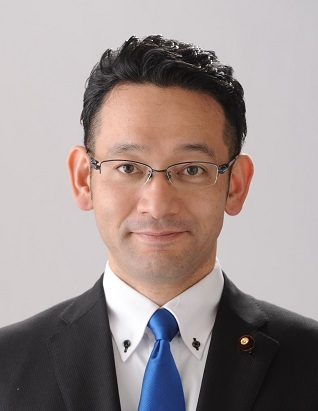
- Official portrait, 2014

Member of the House of Representatives
- Incumbent
- Assumed office 19 December 2012
- Preceded by: Mikio Shimoji
- Constituency: Okinawa 1st (2012–2014); Kyushu PR (2014–2026); Okinawa 1st (2026–present)

Member of the Okinawa Prefectural Assembly
- In office 2004–2008
- Constituency: Naha City
- In office 2000–2003
- Constituency: Naha City

Personal details
- Born: 10 January 1973 (age 53) Naha, Okinawa, Japan
- Party: Liberal Democratic
- Education: Waseda University

Konosuke Kokuba (國場幸之助, Kokuba Konosuke; born 10 January 1973) is a Japanese politician serving as a member of the House of Representatives since 2012. He was a member of the Okinawa Prefectural Assembly from 2000 to 2003 and from 2004 to 2008.
