= Kerama Airport =

Airport in Fukaji Island, Japan

Kerama Airport 慶良間空港
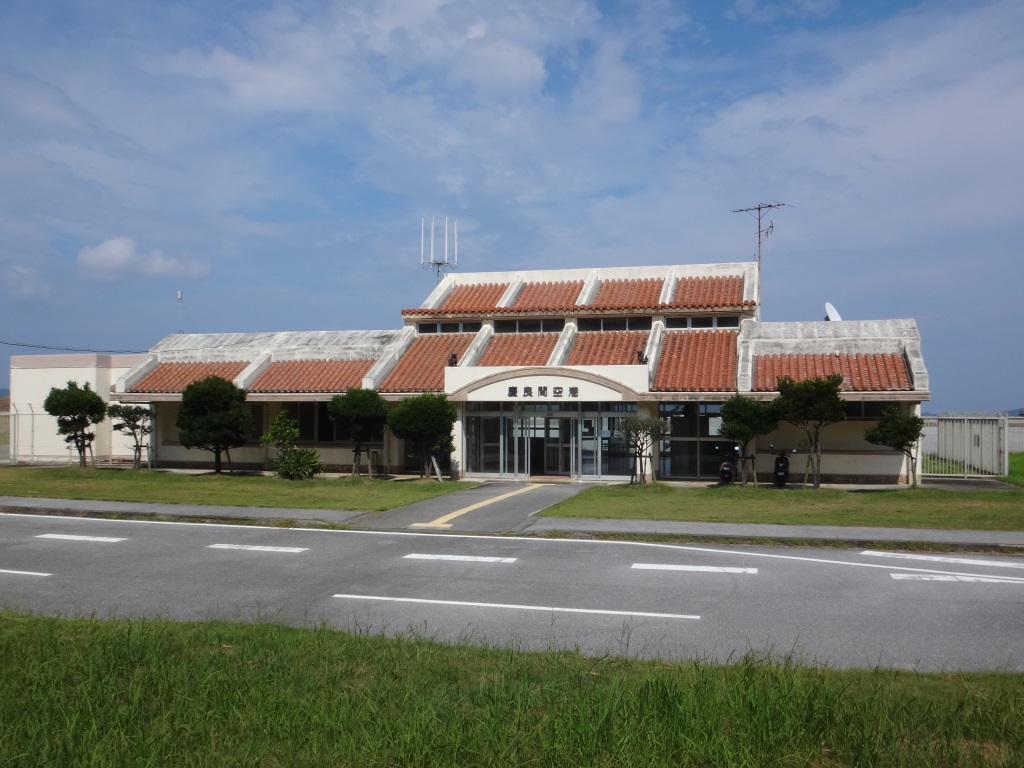
- IATA: KJP; ICAO: ROKR

Summary
- Airport type: Public
- Operator: Okinawa Prefecture
- Serves: Kerama Islands, Japan
- Location: Fukaji Island
- Elevation AMSL: 156 ft (48 m)
- Coordinates: 26°10′06″N 127°17′36″E

Map
- Location in Japan ROKR (Japan)

Runways
| Direction | Length | | Surface |
| Direction | m | ft | Surface |
|---|---|---|---|
| 02/20 | 800 | 2,625 | Asphalt concrete |

Statistics (2015)
- Passengers: 498
- Cargo (metric tonnes): 0
- Aircraft movement: 233
- Source: Japanese Ministry of Land, Infrastructure, Transport and Tourism

Kerama Airport (慶良間空港, Kerama Kūkō) (IATA: KJP, ICAO: ROKR) is an airport serving the Kerama Islands in Shimajiri District, Okinawa Prefecture, Japan. It is located on Fukaji Island (外地島, Fukajijima), which is part of the Village of Zamami. The airport is linked by a road bridge to the islands of Geruma and Aka.

The prefecture operates the airport, which is classified as a third class airport. Kerama gained commercial flights on an on and off basis in 1984. In 2006 Ryukyu Air Commuter suspended flights.
