= Mikio Shimoji =

Japanese politician

- 下地 幹郎
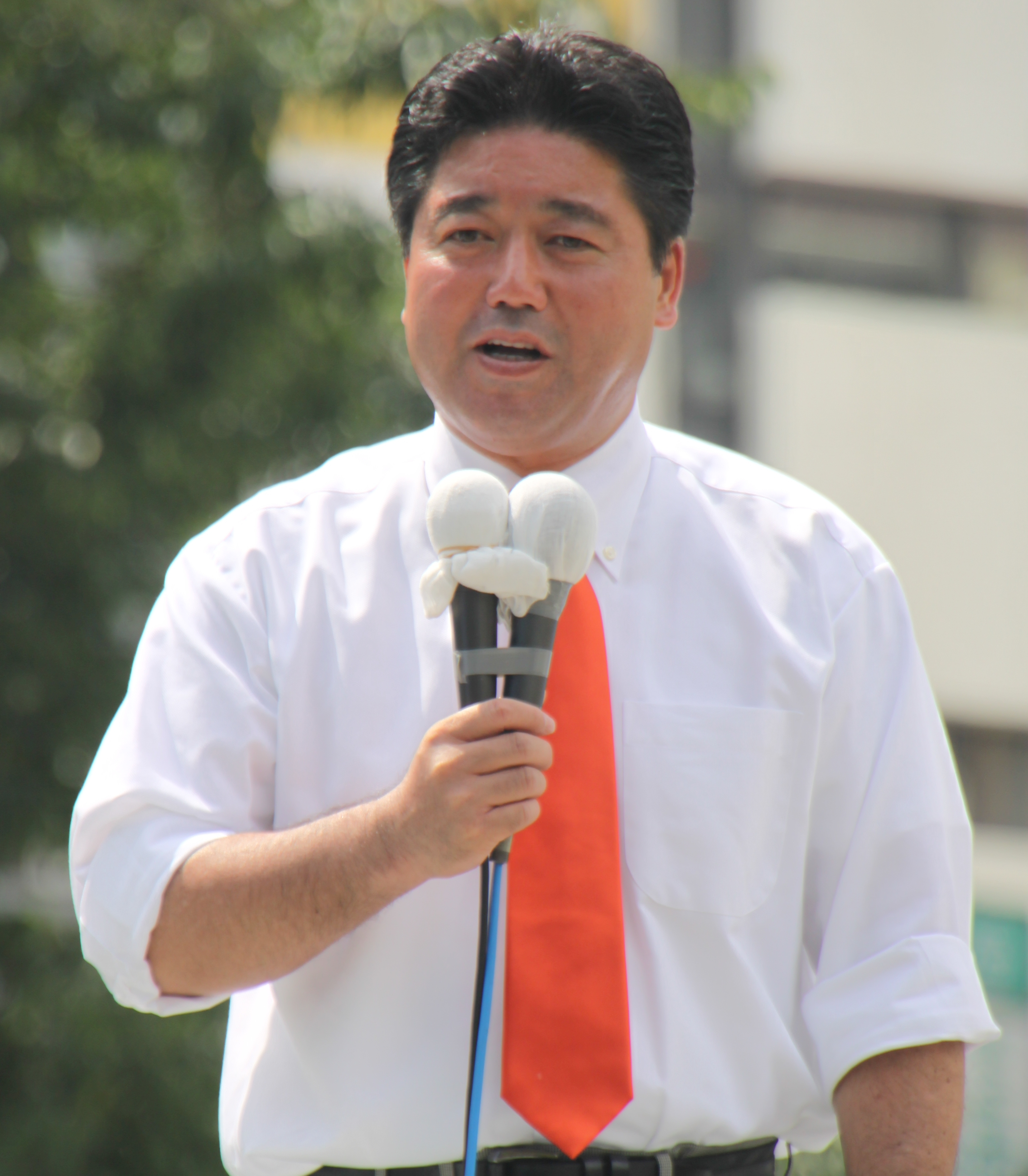
- Shimoji in 2012

Minister of State for Disaster Management
- In office 1 October 2012 – 26 December 2012
- Prime Minister: Yoshihiko Noda
- Preceded by: Masaharu Nakagawa
- Succeeded by: Keiji Furuya

Member of the House of Representatives
- In office 19 December 2014 – 14 October 2021
- Constituency: Kyushu PR
- In office 12 September 2005 – 16 November 2012
- Preceded by: Tai'ichi Shiraho
- Succeeded by: Kōnosuke Kokuba
- Constituency: Okinawa 1st
- In office 21 October 1996 – 10 October 2003
- Preceded by: Constituency established
- Succeeded by: Multi-member district
- Constituency: Kyushu PR

Personal details
- Born: 14 August 1961 (age 65) Hirara, Okinawa, USCAR
- Party: Innovation (since 2015); PGOR (since 2005)
- Other political affiliations: LDP (1996–2003); Independent (2003–2005); PNP (2005–2013); JRP (2014–2015)
- Education: Chuo Gakuin University
- Website: Official website

Mikio Shimoji (下地 幹郎, Shimoji Mikio; born 14 August 1961) is a former Japanese politician, who served as a member of the Initiatives from Osaka party in the House of Representatives in the Diet (national legislature). A native of Hirara, Okinawa, and graduate of Chuo Gakuin University, he was elected for the first time in 1996 as a member of the Liberal Democratic Party. He previously joined People's New Party in 2008. Shimoji was Minister of State for Disaster Management for the final 2.5 months of the cabinet of Prime Minister Yoshihiko Noda.

Shimoji has contested Okinawa's 1st district in almost every election since 1996. He was first elected as the district's representative in 2005. He was re-elected in 2009, but lost his seat in the 2012 election. Shimoji recontested the seat in the 2014 election. While unable to win the seat outright, he obtained a seat through his spot in Japan Restoration Party's PR list.
