= Kōichi Taira =

Japanese politician (1909–1982)

- 平良 幸市
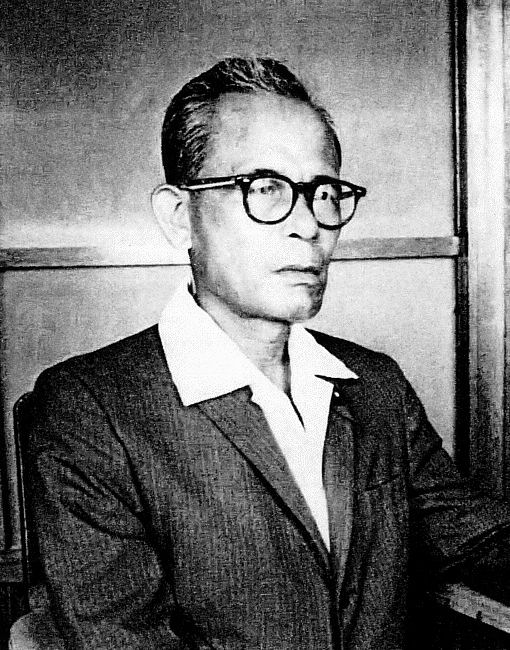
- Taira in 1962

Governor of Okinawa Prefecture
- In office 15 June 1976 – 23 November 1978
- Monarch: Hirohito
- Preceded by: Chōbyō Yara
- Succeeded by: Takemori Nijima (acting); Junji Nishime

Personal details
- Born: 23 July 1909 Nishihara, Okinawa, Japan
- Died: 5 March 1982 (aged 72) Tokyo, Japan
- Party: Okinawa Social Mass
- Education: University of the Ryukyus

Kōichi Taira (平良 幸市, Taira Kōichi; 23 July 1909 – 5 March 1982) was a Japanese politician. He was Governor of Okinawa Prefecture from 1976 until 1978.

== Early life ==
Taira graduated from the Okinawa Normal School in 1928 and worked as an elementary school teacher prior to World War II. During the war, he worked for the prefectural government from 1942 to 1944, and was conscripted to defend the island during the Battle of Okinawa in 1945, in which he was captured and held as a prisoner of war.

== Political career ==
Taira served as the mayor of his home village of Nishihara from 1947 to 1950, as a member of the Ryukyu Islands Legislature from 1954 to 1972, and following the reversion of Okinawa to Japanese control, as a member of the Okinawa Prefectural Assembly from 1972 to 1976. He ultimately led the Okinawa Social Mass Party, one of the three reformist parties that controlled the assembly during the 1970s.

=== Governor of Okinawa Prefecture (1976–1978) ===
Taira's 1976 gubernatorial campaign focused on local autonomy. He largely continued the pacifist and self-government policies of his predecessor Chobyo Yara, with one focus being an attempt to enact a new national law that would place U.S. military land under national government control and systematically reduce and re-utilize it over time.

He resigned due to illness in December 1978, leading to a special gubernatorial election that was won by conservative Junji Nishime, beginning an 11-year period of conservative rule in Okinawa.

Preceded by Chobyo Yara	Governor of Okinawa; 15 June 1976 – 23 November 1978	Succeeded by Junji Nishime
