= Okinawa Prefectural Assembly =

Parliament of Okinawa Prefecture, Japan

Okinawa Prefectural Assembly 沖縄県議会 Okinawa-kengikai

Type
- Type: Unicameral

History
- Founded: 1909; reestablished in 1972 after the end of U.S. military rule

Leadership
- President (gichō): Noboru Akamine, Independent
- Vice President (fuku-gichō): Hiraki Nakada, Liberal Democratic Party

Structure
- Seats: 48
- Political groups: Government (21): Tida Peace Network (7); Constitutional Democratic Party and Independents (7); JCP (4); Social Mass (3); Opposition (21): LDP and LDP-aligned independents (21); Neutral (4): Kōmeitō (4); Vacant (2): Vacant (2)

Elections
- Last election: 16 June 2024

Meeting place
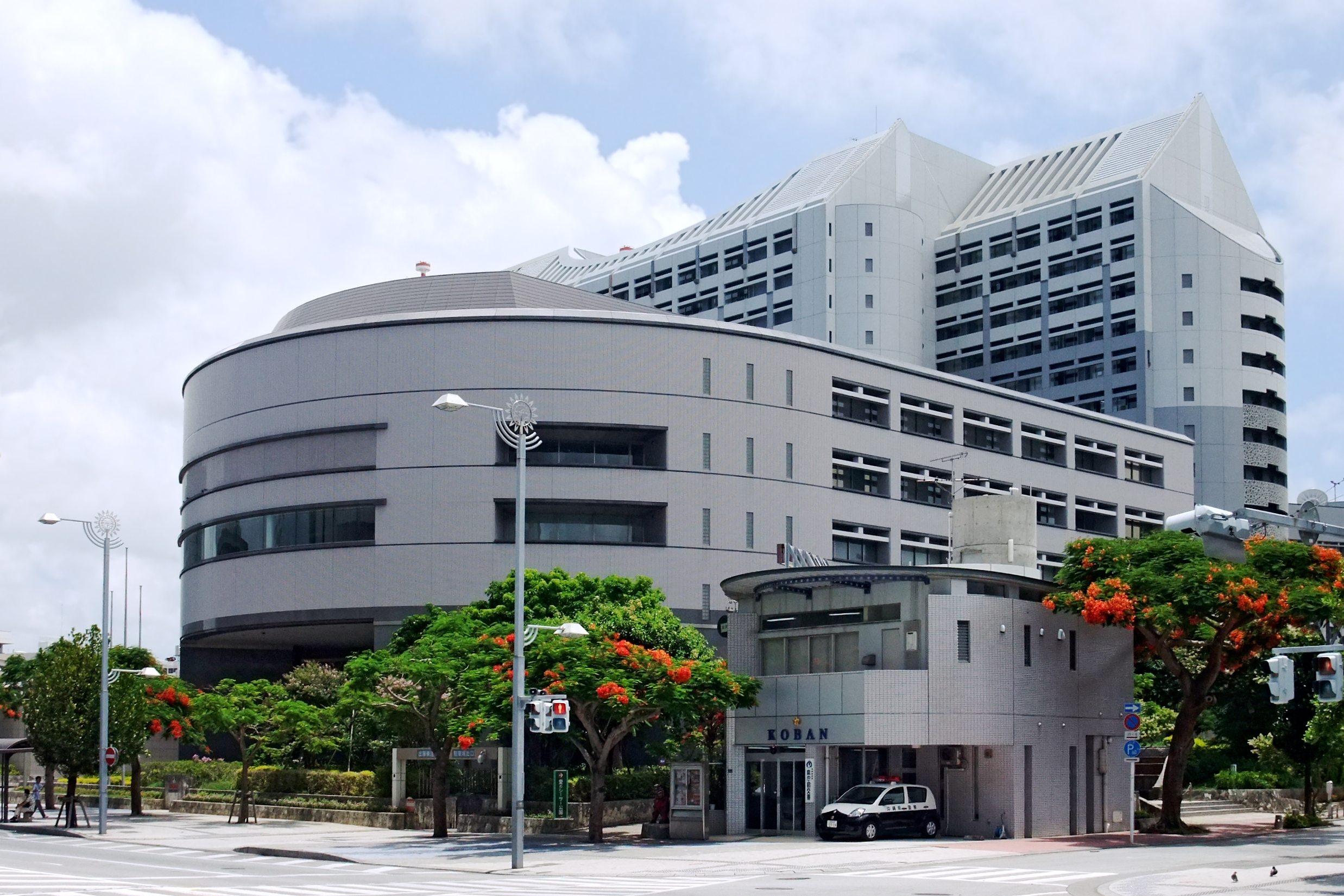

Website
- Official website

The Okinawa Prefectural Assembly (Japanese: 沖縄県議会, Hepburn: Okinawa-kengikai) is the prefectural parliament of Okinawa.

Its 48 members are elected every four years in 14 districts by single non-transferable vote (SNTV). 13 electoral districts are multi-member district, one district is a single-member district where SNTV becomes equivalent to First-past-the-post voting.

The assembly is responsible for enacting and amending prefectural ordinances, approving the budget and voting on important administrative appointments made by the governor including the vice-governors.

Unlike most mainland prefectural assemblies (Hokkaidō is another exception) the Okinawa Prefectural Assembly was not in existence continuously since 1878. After the Battle of Okinawa, the United States military governed the prefecture. The civilian branch of the military government was the United States Civil Administration of the Ryukyu Islands; a Legislature of the Government of the Ryukyu Islands (立法院) was created in 1952. After Okinawa's return to the mainland in 1972, the Prefectural Assembly was restored. Since then, it had been one of three prefectures in the country that do not elect their assemblies in unified local elections (last round: 2011), the other two being Ibaraki and Tokyo (In 2011, another three prefectures hit by the Great East Japan earthquake postponed their elections).

== Current composition ==
As of 2026, the assembly is composed as follows:

Composition of the Okinawa Prefectural Assembly
Parliamentary group	Seats
Liberal Democratic Party	21
Tida Peace Network	7
Constitutional Democratic Party and Independents	7
Kōmeitō	4
Japanese Communist Party	4
Okinawa Social Mass Party	3
Vacant	2
Total (including vacant seats)	48

== Electoral districts ==
Most electoral districts in Okinawa correspond to current cities or former counties (the counties, abolished as administrative unit in 1921, had initially by definition served as electoral districts for prefectural assemblies in the Empire).

Electoral districts
District	Municipalities	Magnitude
Nago City	Nago City	2
Uruma City	Uruma City	4
Okinawa City	Okinawa City	5
Ginowan City	Ginowan City	3
Urasoe City	Urasoe City	4
Naha City	Naha City	11
Tomigusuku City	Tomigusuku City	2
Itoman City	Itoman City	2
Nanjō City	Nanjō City	1
Miyakojima City	Miyakojima City; Tarama Village	2
Ishigaki City	Ishigaki City; Taketomi Town; Yonaguni Town	2
Kunigami County	Kunigami Village; Ōgimi Village; Higashi Village; Nakijin Village; Motobu Town; Onna Village; Ginoza Village; Kin Town; Ie Village; Izena Village; Iheya Village	2
Nakagami County	Yomitan Village; Kadena Town; Chatan Town; North Nakagusuku Village; Nakagusuku Village; Nishihara Town	5
Shimajiri County	Yaese Town; Yonabaru Town; Haebaru Town; Kumejima Town; Tokashiki Village; Zamami Village; Aguni Village; Tonaki Village; South Daitō Village; North Daitō Village	3

== List of presidents and vice presidents ==
=== Presidents ===
No.	Name	Took office	Left office	Political party
Pre-war (before 1945)
1	Takamine Chōkyō (高嶺 朝教)	28 June 1909	20 May 1912	
2	Nakayoshi Chōjo (仲吉 朝助)	20 August 1912	14 July 1916	
3	Ie Chōjo (伊江 朝助)	25 November 1916	10 May 1917	
4	Takara Rintoku (高良 隣德)	15 November 1917	25 March 1919	
5	Nakada Tokuzō (仲田 徳三)	10 June 1919	10 May 1920	
6	Kamiya Natsukichi (神谷 夏吉)	26 November 1920	20 May 1921	
7	Ōshiro Kōnoichi (大城 幸之一)	21 June 1921	20 May 1925	
8	Taira Shinjun (平良 真順)	22 June 1925	20 May 1933	
9	Morishima Meichō (盛島 明長)	21 June 1933	24 February 1936	
10	Uema Tokunosuke (上間 徳之助)	4 December 1936	May 1937	
11	Takehara Ansa (嵩原 安佐)	7 July 1937	1942	
12	Aragaki Tōta (新垣 登太)	10 June 1942	1945	
Post-war (since 1972)
1	Katsu Hoshi (星 克)	15 May 1972	24 June 1972	
2	Kōichi Taira (平良 幸市)	7 July 1972	28 February 1976	
3	Hideo Chibana (知花 英夫)	28 February 1976	15 November 1978	
4	Masakazu Ōta (大田 昌知)	19 December 1978	24 June 1984	
5	Megumi Shimura (志村 恵)	28 June 1984	24 June 1988	
6	Kazuo Taira (平良 一男)	28 June 1988	24 June 1992	
7	Mitsuo Gima (儀間 光男)	26 June 1992	28 December 1994	
8	Chiken Kakazu (嘉数 知賢)	28 December 1994	24 June 1996	
9	Shinsuke Tomoyori (友寄 信助)	28 June 1996	24 June 2000	
10	Kōkichi Iramina (伊良皆 高吉)	25 June 2000	29 June 2004	
11	Seizen Hokama (外間 盛善)	29 June 2004	21 June 2006	
12	Toshinobu Nakasato (仲里 利信)	21 June 2006	24 June 2008	
13	Zenshin Takamine (高嶺 善伸)	26 June 2008	24 June 2012	
14	Masaharu Kina (喜納 昌春)	26 June 2012	24 June 2016	
15	Yonekichi Shinzato (新里 米吉)	28 June 2016	1 July 2019	
(acting)	Nobuni Karimata (狩俣 信子)	1 July 2019	24 June 2020	
16	Noboru Akamine (赤嶺 昇)	30 June 2020	Incumbent	

=== Vice presidents ===
No.	Name	Took office	Left office	Political party
Pre-war (before 1945)
1	Tamanaha Jūzen (玉那覇 重善)	28 June 1909	28 February 1912	
2	Ōhama Yōyō (大浜 用要)	25 November 1912	10 May 1913	
3	Ōta Chōfu (太田 朝敷)	12 November 1913	May 1916	
4	Chinen Kataki (知念 堅輝)	15 November 1916	10 May 1917	
5	Nakada Tokuzō (仲田 徳三)	15 November 1917	10 June 1919	
6	Ōshiro Kamezaku (大城 亀作)	10 June 1919	10 May 1921	
7	Morishima Meichō (盛島 明長)	21 June 1921	10 May 1929	
8	Maeuejō Noboru (前上門 昇)	2 July 1929	10 May 1933	
9	Hirada Yoshisaku (平田 吉作)	21 June 1933	May 1937	
10	Yabiku Mōtoku (屋比久 孟徳)	7 July 1937	1942	
11	Nishihara Gaichi (西原 雅一)	10 June 1942	1943	
12	Irei Masayuki (伊礼 正幸)	29 June 1943	1945	
Post-war (since 1972)
1	Tokuichi Igei (伊芸 徳一)	15 May 1972	24 June 1972	
2	Saneyoshi Furuken (古堅 実吉)	7 July 1972	24 June 1976	
3	Seiei Sakihama (崎浜 盛永)	2 July 1976	19 December 1978	
4	Yasunobu Yoza (与座 康信)	19 December 1978	24 June 1980	
5	Chōzō Kobashigawa (小橋川 朝蔵)	28 June 1980	10 June 1982	
6	Kazuo Taira (平良 一男)	10 June 1982	24 June 1984	
7	Takeo Sunagawa (砂川 武雄)	28 June 1984	26 June 1987	
8	Seishin Murayama (村山 盛信)	26 June 1987	24 June 1988	
9	Shigemasa Kaneshiro (金城 重正)	28 June 1988	26 June 1990	
10	Chūei Teruya (照屋 忠英)	26 June 1990	24 June 1992	
11	Shūzō Sakihama (崎浜 秀三)	26 June 1992	28 December 1994	
12	Akira Nakane (中根 章)	28 December 1994	24 June 1996	
13	Seizen Hokama (外間 盛善)	28 June 1996	24 June 2000	
14	Masahiko Takara (高良 政彦)	27 June 2000	24 June 2004	
15	Tetsuji Shingaki (新垣 哲司)	29 June 2004	21 June 2006	
16	Kōsuke Gushi (具志 孝助)	21 June 2006	24 June 2008	
17	Yoshikazu Tamaki (玉城 義和)	26 June 2008	24 June 2012	
18	Ishō Urasaki (浦崎 唯昭)	26 June 2012	15 July 2014	
19	Masatoshi Onaga (翁長 政俊)	15 July 2014	24 June 2016	
20	Noboru Akamine (赤嶺 昇)	28 June 2016	24 June 2020	
21	Hiraki Nakada (仲田 弘毅)	30 June 2020	Incumbent	
