= Masahisa Miyazaki =

Japanese politician (born 1965)

- 宮崎 政久
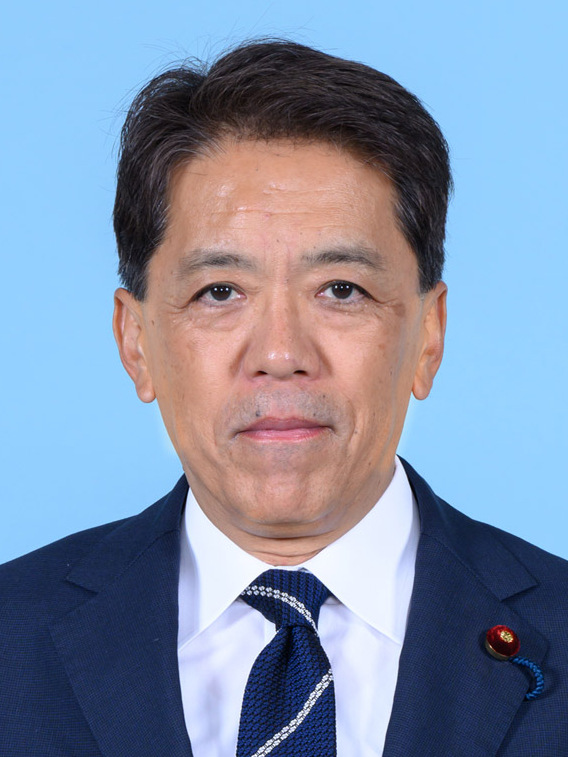
- Official portrait, 2025

Member of the House of Representatives
- Incumbent
- Assumed office 22 November 2018
- Preceded by: Hiroyuki Sonoda
- Constituency: Kyushu PR (2018–2026); Okinawa 2nd (2026–present)
- In office 21 December 2012 – 28 September 2017
- Constituency: Kyushu PR

Personal details
- Born: 8 August 1965 (age 61) Ueda, Nagano, Japan
- Party: Liberal Democratic
- Education: Meiji University

Masahisa Miyazaki (宮﨑政久, Miyazaki Masahisa; born 8 August 1965) is a Japanese politician. He has been a member of the House of Representatives since 2018, having previously served from 2012 to 2017. He served as chairman of the economy, trade and industry committee from 2024 to 2025.
