= Zamami, Okinawa =

Zamami 座間味村 Kushigiruma
- Village
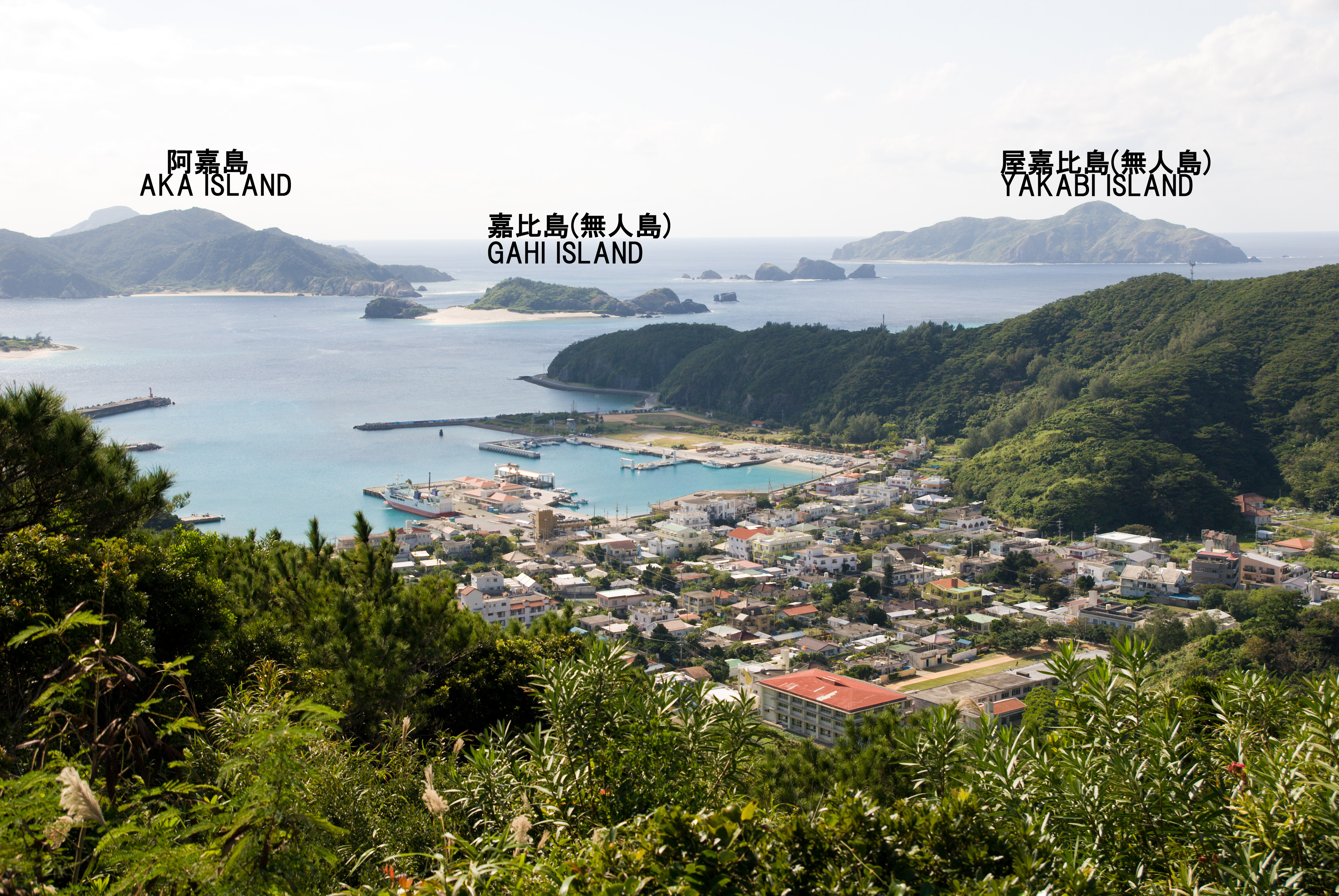
- View of Zamami

- Flag Seal

- Location of Zamami in Okinawa

- Location in Japan
- Coordinates: 26°13′44″N 127°18′12″E
- Country: Japan
- Region: Kyushu
- Prefecture: Okinawa
- District: Shimajiri

Area
  - Total: 16.74 km^{2} (6.46 sq mi)

Population (October 2020)
  - Total: 892
  - Density: 53.29/km^{2} (138.0/sq mi)
- Time zone: UTC+09:00 (JST)
- Website: www.vill.zamami.okinawa.jp
- Symbols
- Flower: Kerama rhododendron

Zamami (座間味村, Zamami-son; Okinawan: Kushigiruma (後慶留間)) is a village located in Shimajiri District, Okinawa Prefecture, Japan. The village consists of more than 20 islands approximately 40 kilometres (25 mi) west of the prefectural capital of Naha. As of October 2020 the village had a population of 892 and a population density of 53.29 persons per km^{2}. The total area of the village of Zamami is 16.74 square kilometres (6.46 mi^{2}).

On March 3, 2014 (Coral Day), the Kerama Islands, including Zamami Village, were designated a Japanese National Park. Other designations of Zamami include a two-star rating in the Michelin Green Guide Japan, as well as a “Wetland of International Importance” under the Ramsar Convention (2005).

== Geography ==
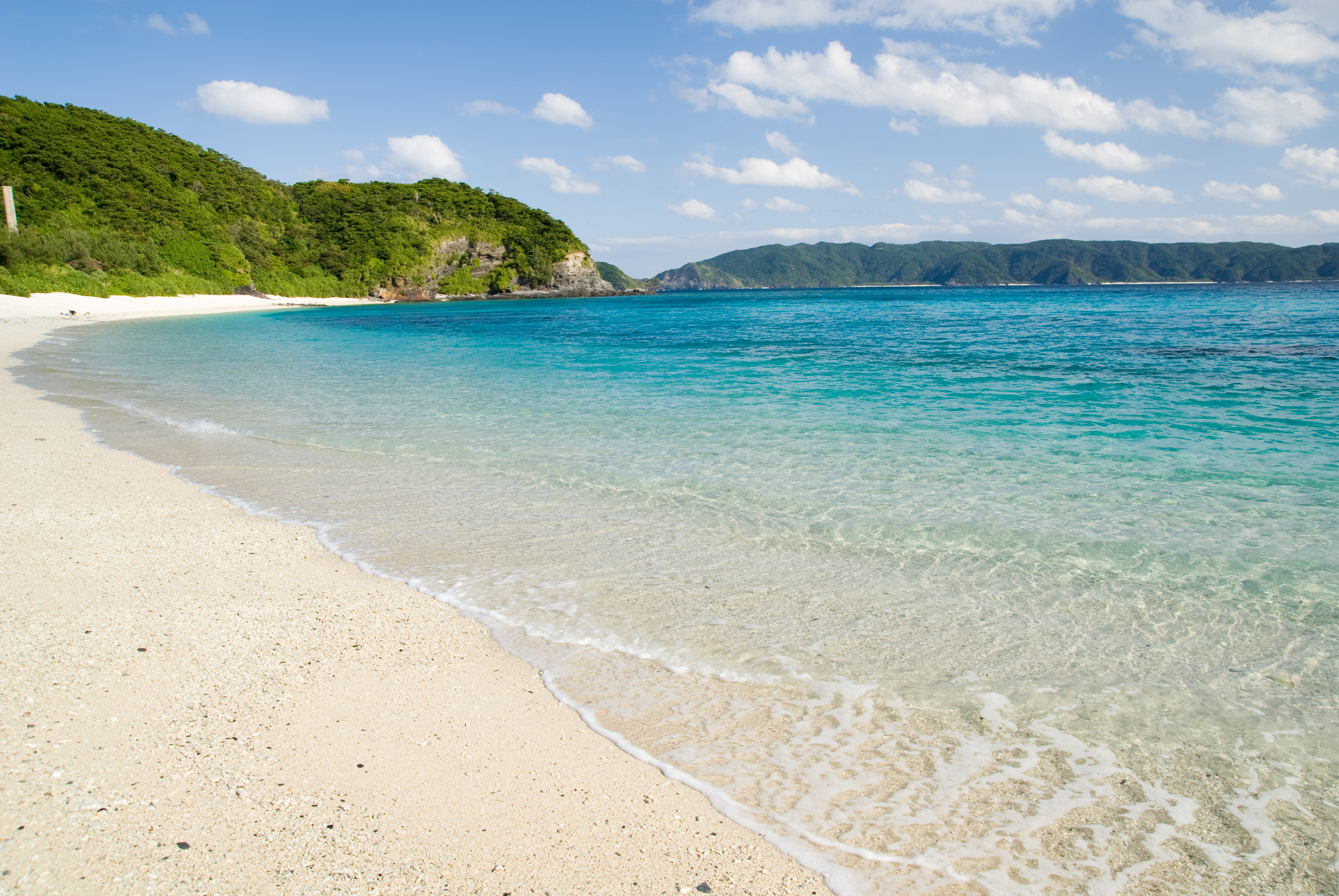
Furuzamami Beach in Zamami Island

The principal islands of the village of Zamami include Zamami (座間味島, Zamamijima), Aka (阿嘉島, Akajima), Geruma (慶留間島, Gerumajima), and Fukaji (外地島, Fukajijima).

Zamami, Aka, and Geruma islands are the only inhabited islands of the village. Many other uninhabited islands are also a part of the village, including Gahi, Agenashiku, Amuro, Yakabi, Kuba, Ou, and Mukaraku.

The village has many coral-sand beaches. For example, on Zamami Island there is Furuzamami Beach and Ama Beach. On Aka Island there is Nishibama Beach.

The islands are quite mountainous. Zamami Island has an observatory atop its central mountain, Takatsukiyama. Aka and Geruma islands are just as hilly. Like much of the rest of Japan, the steep topography leaves relatively little level land for agriculture and inhabitation.

=== Administrative divisions ===
The village includes five wards.

- Aka (阿嘉)
- Ama (阿真)
- Asa (阿佐)
- Geruma (慶留間)
- Zamami (座間味)

== History ==
Zamami was settled as early as the Shellmidden Period of the Ryukyu Islands. The period corresponds roughly to the Jōmon period (14,000 – 300 BC) of the Japanese home islands. Shell middens in Zamami include the Furuzamami midden on Zamami Island and the Utaha midden on Aka Island.

Zamami emerged under the Ryukyu Kingdom as the Jiyaman magiri. The magiri was a type of regional administrative district in Okinawa in the pre-modern period, and Jiyaman magiri, together with Tōkashichi magiri, controlled the Kerama Islands. Zamami was noted for its excellent port, and due to its proximity to Okinawa Island, was used as a port for trade with China during the fourteenth century. The Chinese vessels would stop in Zamami Island's Ago-no-Ura bay to wait for favorable winds before proceeding on toward China.

Prior to World War II the village was noted for the production of charcoal used in Naha. The village was noted for its numerous fisherman. Bonito fishing was introduced to Zamami in 1901, the first in Okinawa Prefecture, and the village became a center of katsuobushi, a dried bonito fillet essential to Japanese cuisine. Additionally, from the beginning of the Meiji Period until the Second World War, Yakabi and Kuba islands were mined for copper. Today the two islands are uninhabited and landing is prohibited except for official religious services at the islands’ sacred sites.

The island was among the first sovereign Japanese lands containing civilian inhabitants to be invaded by America during World War II. It was taken on March 26, 1945 along with other islands in the Kerama archipelago. Before and during the invasion, citizens of Zamami were ordered by the Japanese military to commit suicide using hand grenades. Controversy surrounding this issue continues to this day. The American military used the Kerama Islands as a base to launch their invasion of the main Okinawan island on April 1, 1945.

== Economy ==
In stark contrast to its calamitous history at the end of World War II, Zamami is now known as a popular tourist destination. Its economy is based almost entirely on tourism, and 92% of the population is employed in the tourism industry. The main activities on Zamami are scuba diving, snorkeling, sea kayaking, standup paddleboarding, and fishing. Furuzamami beach is popular for its crystal clear waters teeming with coral and fish. Many people flock to the island in winter and early spring for the chance to see humpback whales. There are many locally operated sightseeing boats for this purpose, as well as observation gazebos located around the island. There are smaller, uninhabited islands nearby which are accessible by boat from Zamami's harbour. Visitors to Zamami can rent and ride motor scooters around the island's narrow and winding mountain roads.

Only 8.38 square kilometres (3.24 mi^{2}) of Zamami is utilized as farmland, and the village has been reduced to only 35 farming families. The village produces small amounts of peanuts, papaya, potatoes, beef, and goat. The fishing industry is likewise in great decline, with only 42 households engaged in fishing. Mozuku (Cladosiphon okamuranus), a type of edible seaweed popular in Okinawan cuisine, is the primary marine product of the village. The Port of Aka on Aka Island is the primary fishing port in the village. The Zamami Village Fisheries Cooperative operates shops on both Zamami and Aka islands that sell fresh-caught fish directly to the public.

== Transportation ==
=== Ferry ===
Zamami can be reached by ferry from Tomari port, which is part of the larger Port of Naha, or via the Aharen port from Tokashiki. The primary port in the village is the Port of Zamami, which opened in May 1972. The port is owned and operated by Okinawa Prefecture. The standard Zamami ferry takes one and a half hours, while the high speed passenger ferry, Queen Zamami III, takes 50 minutes to reach the islands from Naha. The ferries stop at both Zamami and Aka before heading back to Naha. The Queen Zamami's schedule changes between its first and second trip of the day. The current schedule can be found here (retrieved 2026-02-07).

=== Bus ===
There is a village-run bus on Zamami Island that brings passengers to either Furuzamami Beach or the Asa Hamlet, or to Ama Beach and the surrounding area. The bus costs ¥300 one way.

=== Air ===
The Kerama Islands are served by the Kerama Airport, located on Fukaji Island.

== Cultural and natural assets ==
Zamami Village hosts four designated tangible cultural properties, at the national or municipal level.

- Name (Japanese) (Type of registration)

=== Cultural Properties ===
- Asa Ship Captain Residence (stone wall and hinpun wall) (阿佐船頭殿の石垣とヒンプン) (Municipal)
- Takara Family Residence (高良家住宅) (National)
- Tuna Fishing Industry Foundation Memorial (鰹漁業創始功労記念碑) (Municipal)

== In popular culture ==
Zamami was the setting for the manga IO.
