= Okinawa People's Party =

Political party in Japan (1947–1973)

Okinawa People's Party 沖縄人民党
- Founded: 20 July 1947
- Dissolved: 31 October 1973
- Merged into: Japanese Communist Party
- Newspaper: The People
- Ideology: Communism; Anti-Americanism
- Political position: Left-wing to far-left

The Okinawa People's Party (Japanese: 沖縄人民党) was a left-wing, communist-led political party in Okinawa Prefecture, Japan. It was founded on 20 July 1947 and advocated the immediate return of the Ryukyu Islands (Okinawa Prefecture and the Satsunan Islands of Kagoshima Prefecture) from the United States to Japan. This was fully realized by the Okinawa Reversion Agreement, which took effect in 1972. The People's Party merged with the Japanese Communist Party the following year and became the Communists' Okinawa prefectural branch.

The People's Party worked closely with the two other Okinawan parties on the left: the Social Mass Party and the Socialist Party. Unlike their counterparts in mainland Japan, the three Okinawan parties shared offices and a few top-ranking members. The People's Party and the Socialist Party also had a formal alliance named the Prefectural People's Conference.

However, unlike its two allied parties, the People's Party was explicitly anti-American. Aside from Okinawa's return to Japan, the People's Party also advocated against the US–Japan Security Treaty and for peaceful relations with the Eastern Bloc. The US administration in Okinawa consequently banned the party's publication, The People (人民), for several years.

== See also ==
- Kamejiro Senaga, member of the Okinawa People's Party who served as mayor of Naha and then as a member of the House of Representatives for Okinawa
