= Political Group of Okinawa Revolution =

Political Group of Okinawa Revolution 政党そうぞう
- Leader: Mikio Shimoji
- Founder: Mikio Shimoji
- Founded: 27 December 2005
- Ideology: Conservatism

The Political Group of Okinawa Revolution (政党そうぞう, Seitō Sōzō) is a local political party in Okinawa, Japan. Seitō means "political party", while sōzō may mean "creation" (創造) or "imagination" (想像). The party is considered as largely conservative.

The party was founded on 27 December 2005 by Mikio Shimoji. He has been the member of the Liberal Democratic Party, at the House of Representatives of the National Diet. In July 2005, he left LDP as he was against the alliance between LDP and New Komeito Party. He then founded the Political Group of Okinawa Revolution.
