= Keiichi Inamine =

Japanese politician

- 稲嶺 惠一
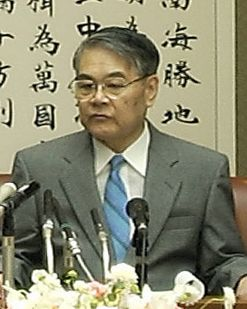
- Inamine in 2003

Governor of Okinawa Prefecture
- In office 10 December 1998 – 9 December 2006
- Monarch: Akihito
- Preceded by: Masahide Ota
- Succeeded by: Hirokazu Nakaima

Personal details
- Born: 14 October 1933 (age 93) Fengtian, Manchukuo (now Liaoning, China)
- Party: Independent
- Education: Keio University

Keiichi Inamine (稲嶺 惠一, Inamine Keiichi; born 14 October 1933) is a Japanese politician who served as the fifth Governor of Okinawa from 1998 until 2006. He studied at, and graduated from, Keio University.
