= Chōbyō Yara =

Japanese politician (1902–1997)

- 屋良 朝苗
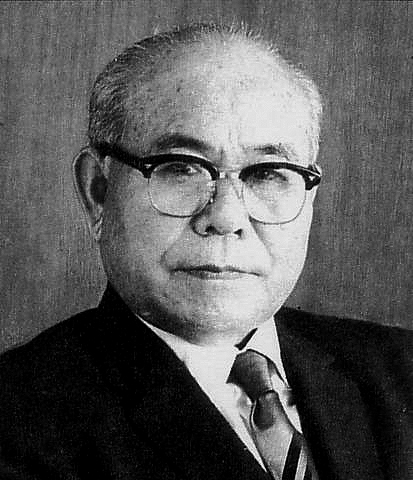

Governor of Okinawa Prefecture
- In office 15 May 1972 – 14 June 1976
- Monarch: Hirohito
- Preceded by: James Benjamin Lampert (as High Commissioner); Himself (as Chief Executive)
- Succeeded by: Koichi Taira

Chief Executive of the Ryukyu Islands
- In office 15 November 1968 – 14 May 1972
- High Commissioner: James Benjamin Lampert
- Preceded by: Seiho Matsuoka
- Succeeded by: Himself (as Governor)

Personal details
- Born: 13 December 1902 Yomitan, Okinawa, Japan
- Died: 14 February 1997 (aged 94) Naha, Okinawa, Japan
- Party: Independent
- Education: Hiroshima University

Chobyo Yara (屋良 朝苗, Yara Chōbyō; 13 December 1902 – 14 February 1997) was a Japanese politician. He served as the Chief Executive of the Government of the Ryukyu Islands (1968–1972) and Governor of Okinawa Prefecture (1972–1976). He graduated from Hiroshima Higher Normal School (now Hiroshima University).

== Biography ==
Yara was a schoolteacher by profession and was serving as president for the Okinawa Teachers' Association at the time of his election to the executive leadership of the American-occupied Ryukyuan government.

Following his victory in the 1968 Ryukyuan legislative election, in which he campaigned for "immediate, unconditional reversion" of Okinawa, he met Prime Minister Eisaku Satō in December 1968 to discuss the immediate reversion of Okinawa to Japan, which Yara supported. In addition, he welcomed not only reversion, but also urged further for a "thinning out of U.S. bases." Yara was critical of these bases in great part due to the economic and environmental stress they put on Okinawans. Nonetheless, Yara had relatively moderate inclinations and cooperated with the Japanese government's requests to use his influence in order to convince radical Okinawan activists to call off a proposed general strike, in return for mainland governmental concessions.

As the Chief Executive, Yara butted heads with MITI after stating in 1970 that "In the introduction of foreign capital, we will give priority to the prefectural interests of Okinawa and will not be submissive to the homeland government."

Preceded by himself as the Chief Executive of the Ryukyu Islands	Governor of Okinawa; 1972–1976	Succeeded by Koichi Taira
