= Okinawa Social Mass Party =

Okinawa Social Mass Party 沖縄社会大衆党 Okinawa Shakai Taishū-tō
- Chairman: Tetsumi Takara
- Founded: 31 October 1950
- Headquarters: Naha, Okinawa
- Ideology: Localism; Social democracy Anti-USJS
- Political position: Left-wing
- Colors: Green
- Representatives: 0 / 465
- Councillors: 0 / 248
- Okinawa Assembly: 3 / 48

Website
- okinawa-shadai.jp

Okinawa Social Mass Party (沖縄社会大衆党, Okinawa Shakai Taishū-tō) is a local political party in Okinawa, Japan. The party's name is abbreviated as Social Mass Party (社会大衆党, Shakai Taishū-tō) or Shadai-tō (社大党). The party primarily adheres to social democracy.

== History ==
The party was founded on 31 October 1950 during the US occupation of the region. On 29 April 1952, the party launched an Association for Promotion of Reversion to Japan, which initiated a signature campaign for the demand of reunification with Japan. The campaign gathered more than 199,000 signatures (72%+ of the eligible voters of Okinawa). At the time, such a campaign was initiated by liberals/leftists, including Okinawa Social Mass Party and another local party called the Okinawa People's Party.

After Okinawa's restoration to Japan in 1972, the latter party was merged into Japanese Communist Party. Okinawa Social Mass Party, on the other hand, did not join any mainland Japanese parties, and continues as a local party to this day.

== Members ==
Members of the House of Councillors of the National Diet

- Tetsumi Takara (高良鉄美) (Officially counted as a member of Okinawa Whirlwind in the House of Councillors.)

Members of the Okinawa Prefectural Assembly

- Kazuma Ōshiro (大城一馬)
- Keiko Higa (比嘉京子)

Members of the Naha City Council

- Satoko Hirara (平良識子)
- Kenjirō Higa (比嘉憲次郎)

Members of the Urasoe City Council

- Sumio Yoza (與座澄雄)
