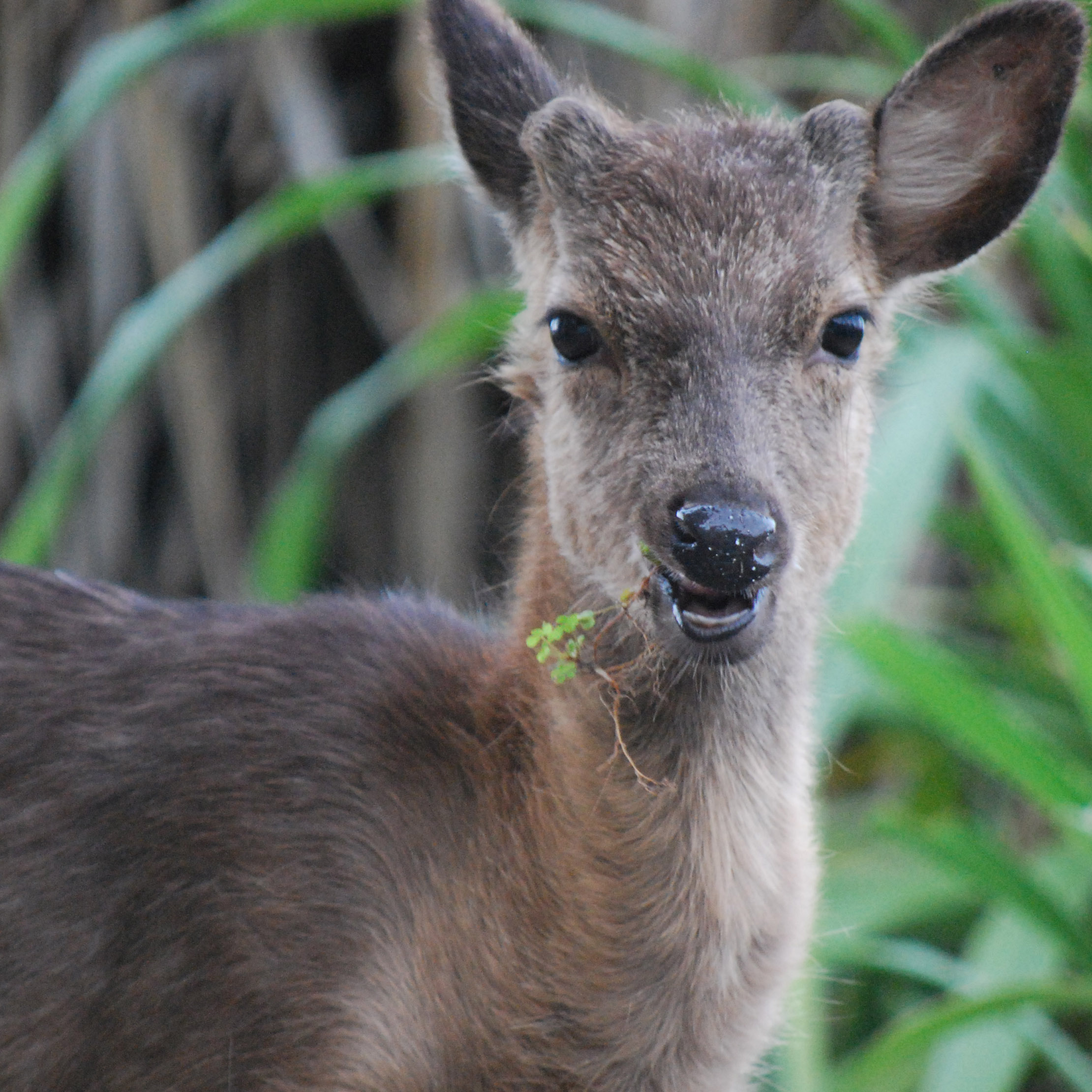
- Kerama deer stands looking into camera with plants hanging out of its mouth

Scientific classification
- Kingdom: Animalia
- Phylum: Chordata
- Class: Mammalia
- Order: Artiodactyla
- Family: Cervidae
- Genus: Cervus
- Species: C. nippon
- Subspecies: C. n. keramae

Trinomial name
- Cervus nippon keramae (Kuroda, 1924)

Synonyms
- Sika nippon keramae Kuroda, 1924

= Kerama deer =

Subspecies of deer

The Kerama deer, also Kerama sika (Cervus nippon keramae) is an endangered subspecies of the Sika deer native to the Kerama Islands. It is currently present on four islands (Aka, Geruma, Fukaji, and Yakabi), having been extirpated from Zamami and Tokashiki.

== History ==
Kerama deer were imported from the Kagoshima Prefecture in the early 17th century. They were heavily hunted because they destroyed crops, causing the population to rapidly decline, and are now a government-protected species. The total known population was 130 as of 1995 on Aka, with about 100 individuals in total on other islands. They have been designated a Natural Monument of Japan.

== Description ==
Kerama deer have dark brown hair. Only the bucks have antlers, which are shed from March to April. They are small, weighing only about 75 kilograms.
