= Aka Island =

Island within Ryukyu Islands

Native name: 阿嘉島 (Aka-nu-shima, Aka)
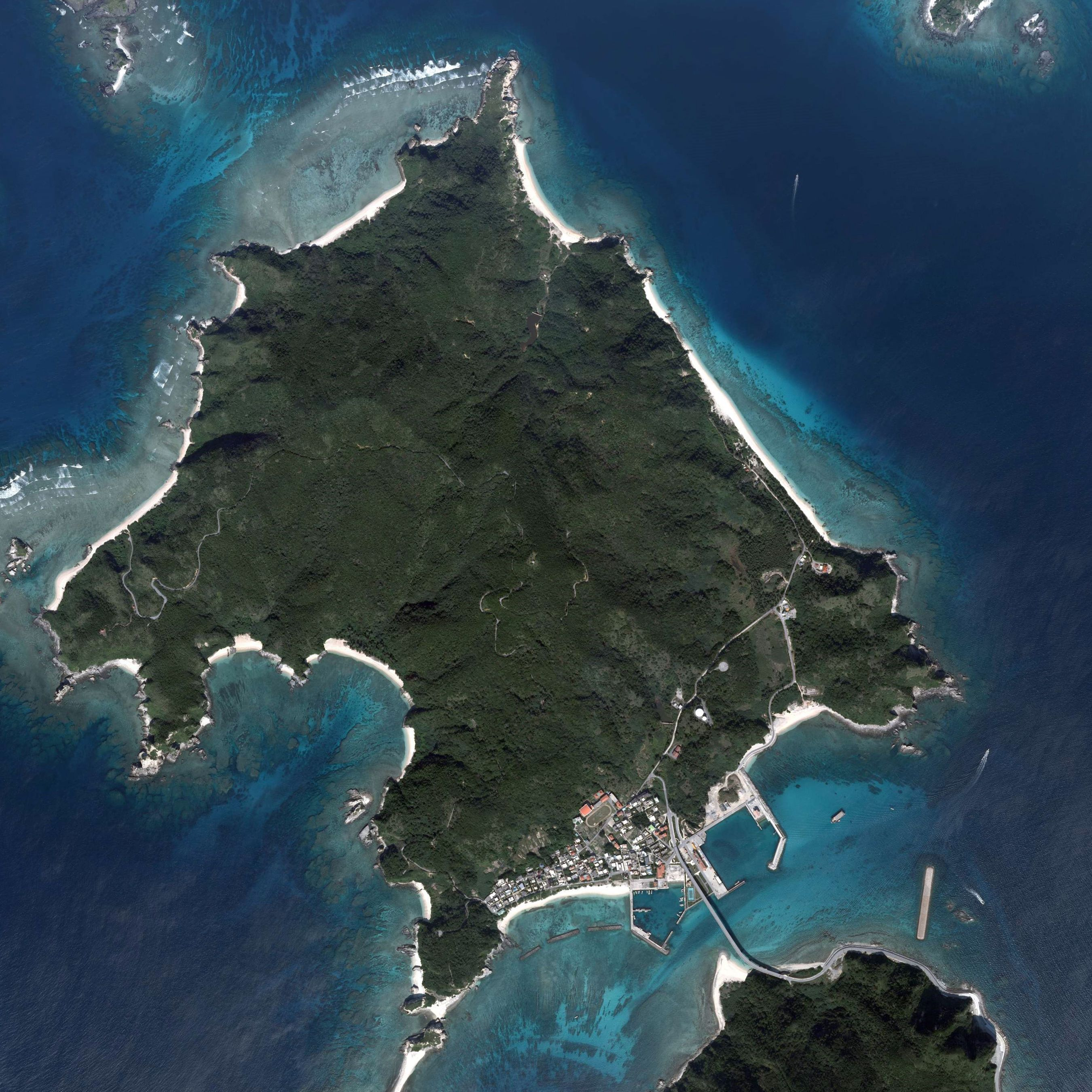
- Aerial view of Aka Island

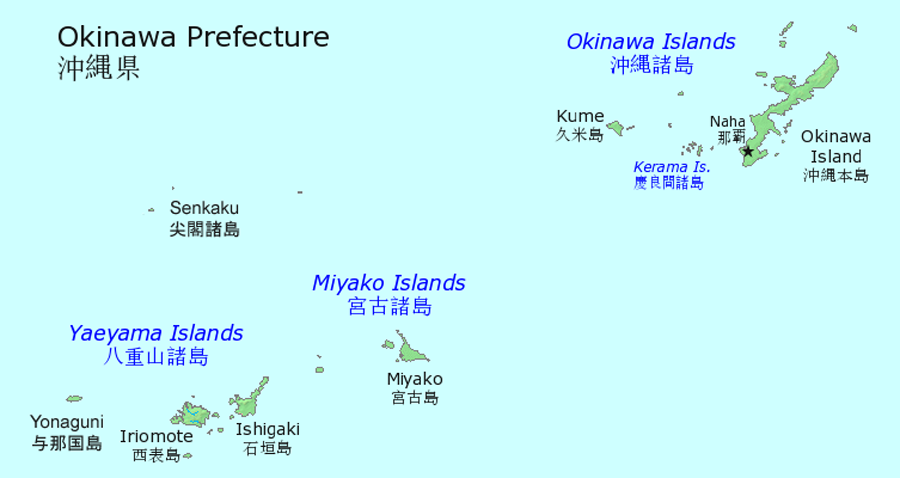

Geography
- Location: Pacific Ocean
- Coordinates: 26°11′56″N 127°16′50″E
- Archipelago: Kerama Islands

Administration
- Japan
- Prefecture: Okinawa Prefecture

Demographics
- Ethnic groups: Ryukyuan, Japanese

Aka Island (阿嘉島, Okinawan:Aka, Aka-nu-shima)is an island in the Pacific Ocean and is part of the Kerama Islands group in Okinawa Prefecture, Japan.

The island is commonly known as Aka or Aka-nu-shima and is located some 15 miles to the southwest of Okinawa Island. It has a subtropical climate and a population of approximately 330 people.

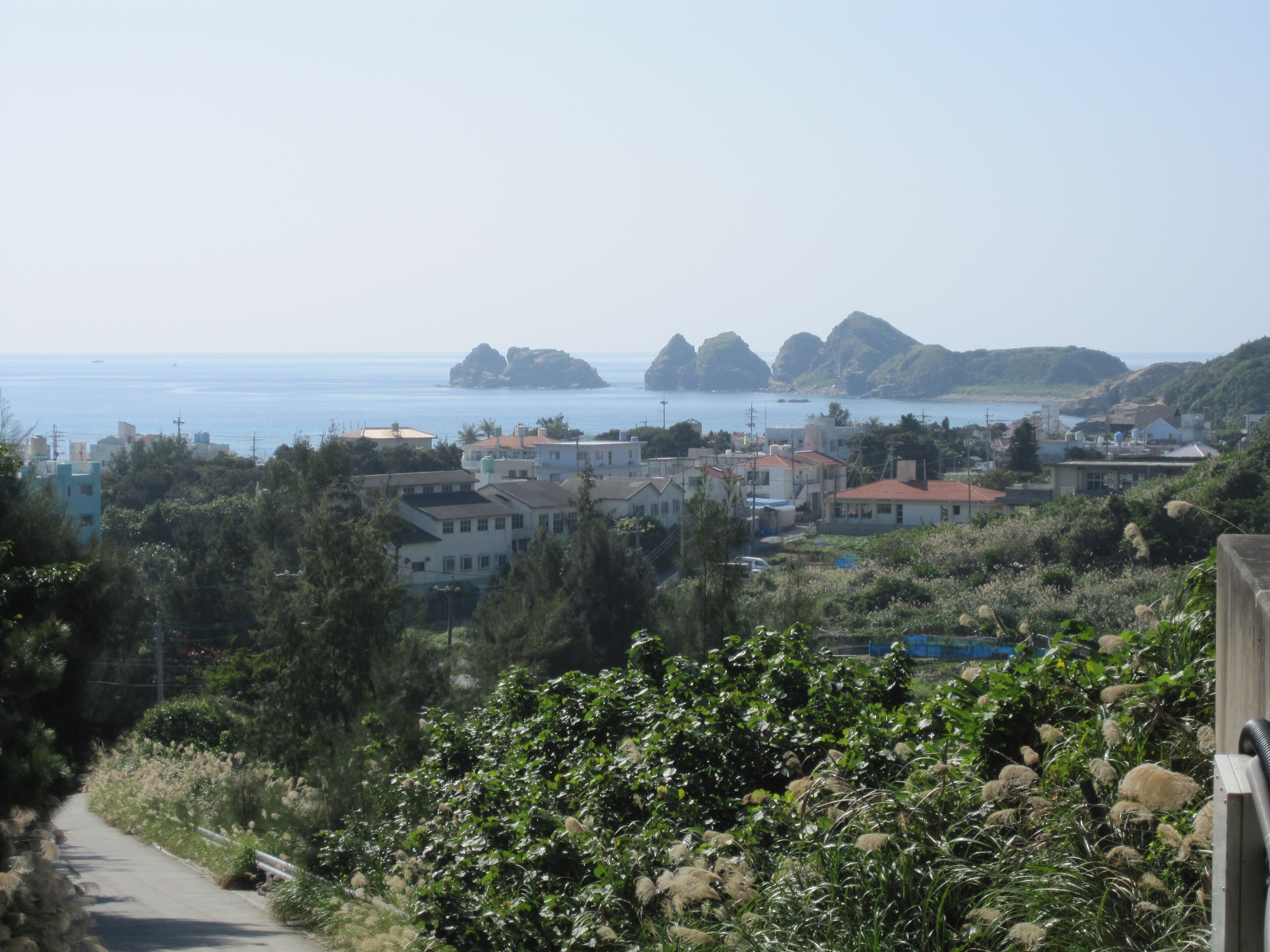
Aka village

== Coral reefs and wildlife ==
The water surrounding Aka-jima is supplied from the Kuroshio current. Healthy coral reefs, with a rich diversity of sea life, make the area a treasure trove for marine scientists, divers and snorkelers.

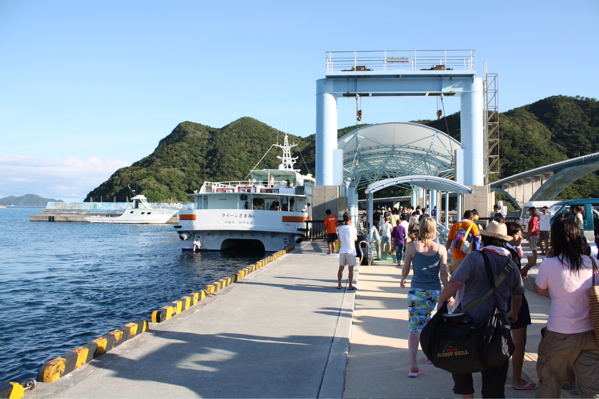
Day trippers and locals boarding the return ferry from Aka-jima to Okinawa

In 1988 Akajima Marine Science Laboratory (AMSL) was established under the auspices of the Japanese Science and Technology Agency. A number of scientists visit AMSL every year to research the coral reef ecosystems.

Around 360 fish species and 1,640 invertebrate species (including hermatypic corals) and 220 seaweed species have been recorded in the Kerama Islands, but many groups of organisms have not yet been surveyed. Green turtles, loggerheads, and hawksbill turtle lay eggs on the beaches in summer. Humpback whales (Megaptera novaeangliae) are regular visitors in January to April and use the Kerama Islands as their breeding ground.

Akajima is also noted for its terrestrial wildlife, especially its birds, butterflies and Golden silk orb-weaver spiders. Kerama deer (a subspecies of the Japanese deer) are unique to the Kerama islands group and are able to swim between the islands. These deer have been designated a national protected species of Japan.

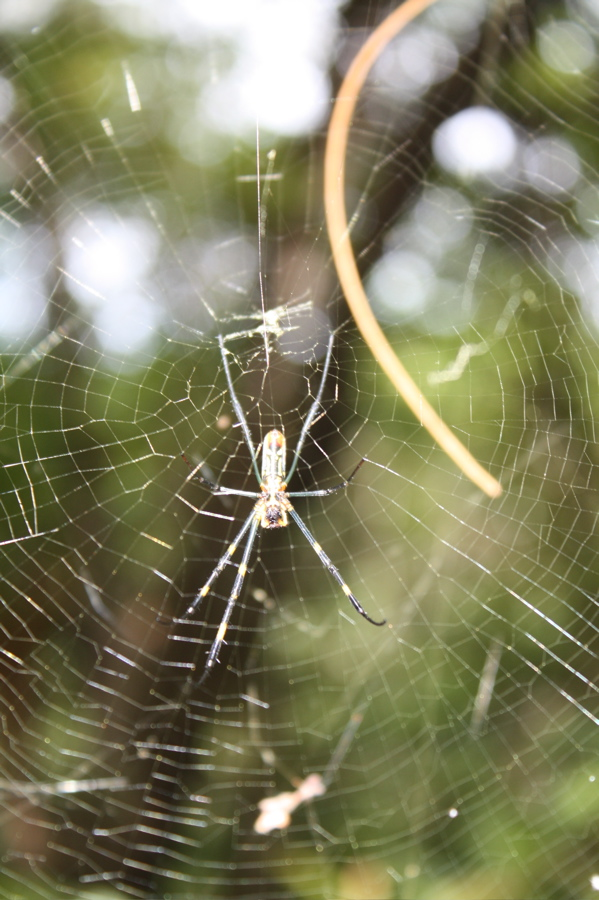
Golden silk orb-weaver spiders are plentiful on Akajima

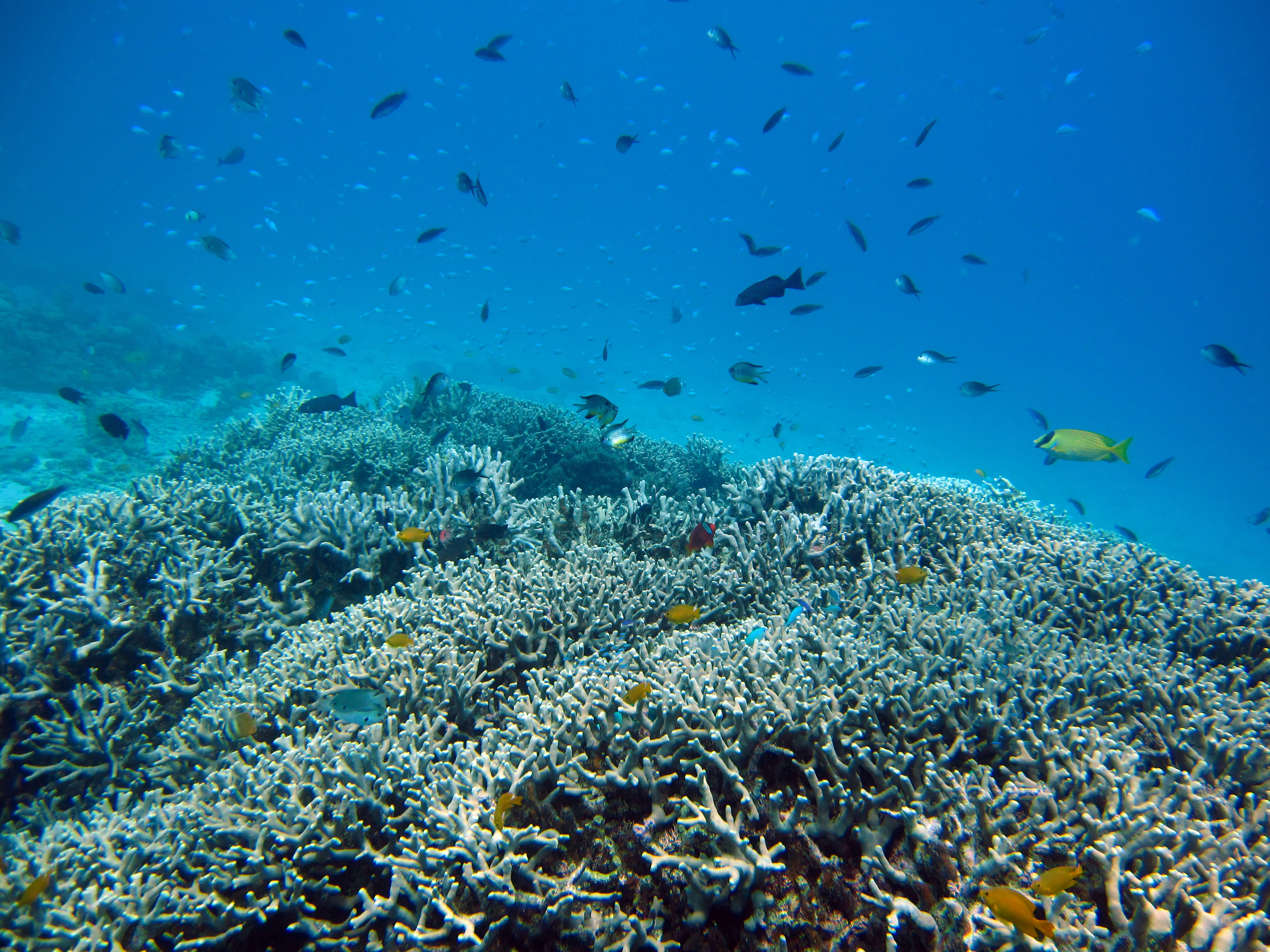
Coral reef near Aka island

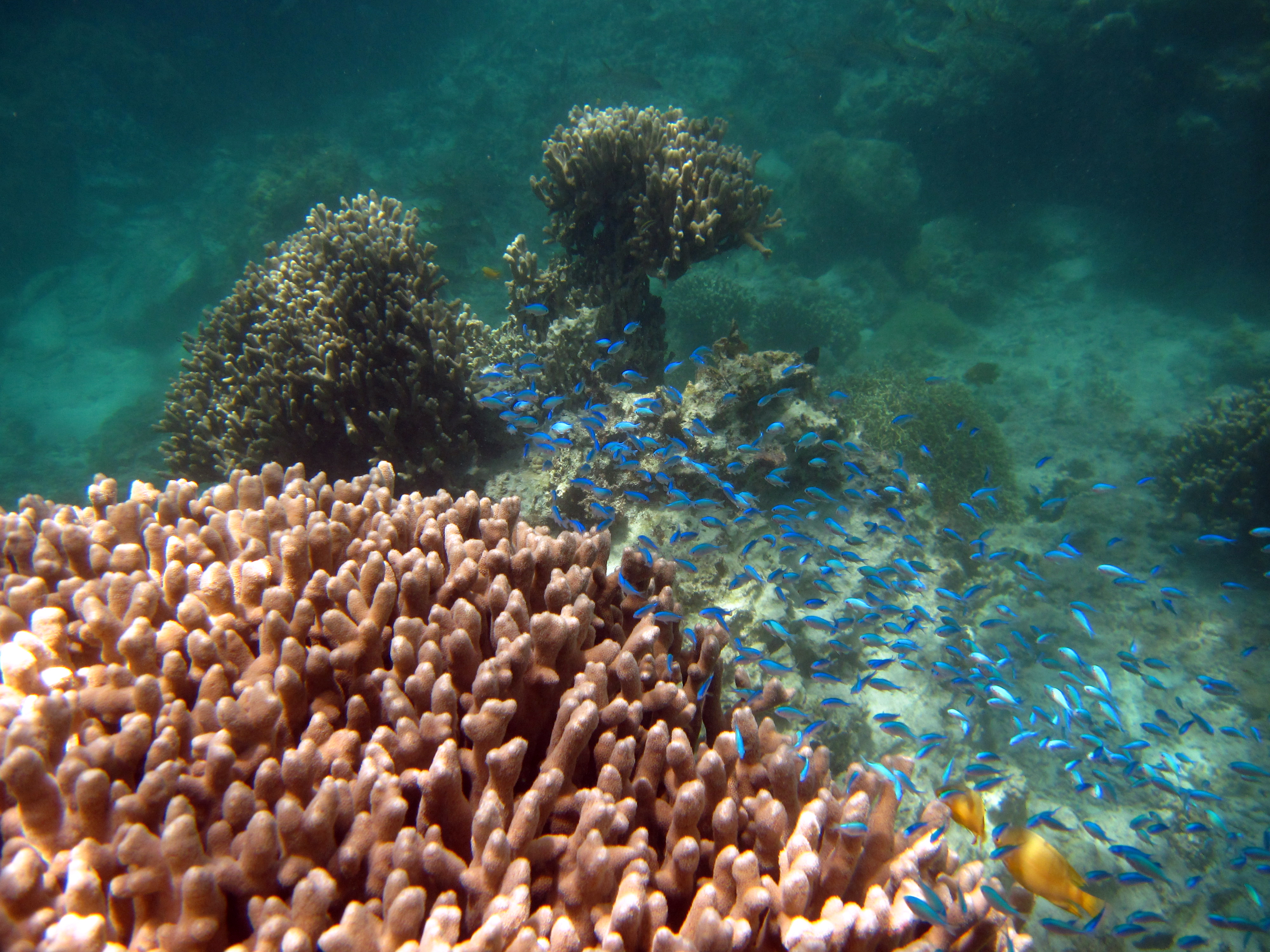
Coral reef near Aka island

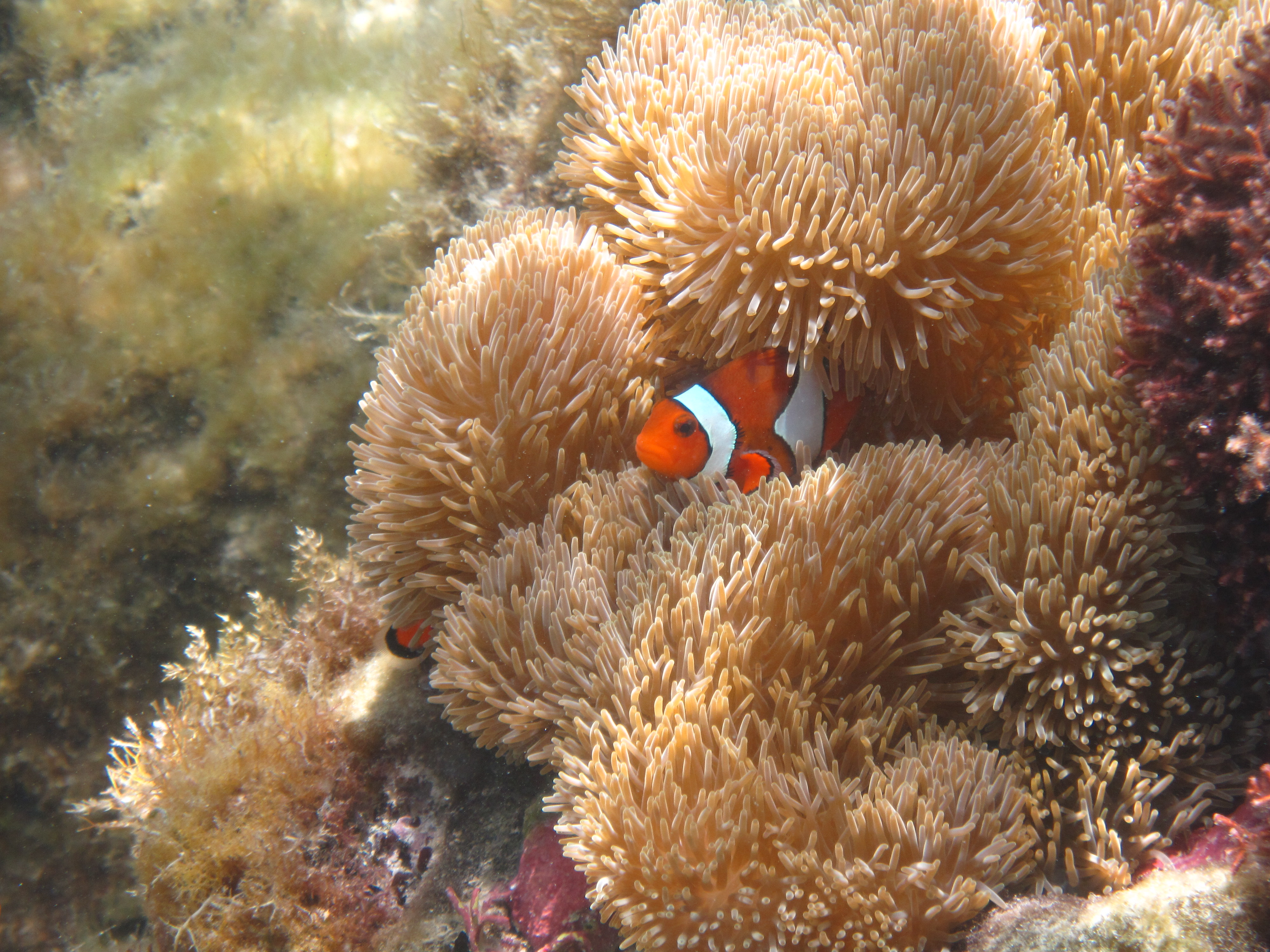
Clownfish at Aka island

== Climate ==
Summers have extreme oceanographic conditions and about five typhoons approach Akajima every year, especially in early summer. The northern monsoon brings strong north winds and large swells from October to April.

== Transport ==
Akajima port has a regular ferry service that links the island with neighbouring Zamami and Tokashiki islands, and another one going to Naha (the capital of Okinawa). The Island is also served by a small airstrip on Fukaji island. Fukaji, Geruma and Aka islands are all connected by road bridges.

== History ==
Historically, the Kerama Island group was a part of the Ryukyu Kingdom. For some 600 years, the islanders were employed as navigators for the Kingdom’s trading vessels between Okinawa and China. The islands also provided good moorings on the sea route. A house of the Takara family, one of the captains of these vessels, is preserved as an Important Cultural Property of Japan.

Aka was one of the first landing places for US Forces in the Battle of Okinawa. US Forces landed on March 26, 1945, and went on to take islands of Zamami, Geruma and Tokashiki. Over 500 residents committed suicide by order of the Japanese troops in order to avoid capture.

Aka-jima is also famous for the story of two dogs: Shiro on Aka-jima and Marilyn on Zamami-jima. They met when Shiro travelled on his owners boat to Zamami but the passion was such that he started swimming over every day to rendezvous with Marilyn on Zamami's Ama beach.

The locals frequently sighted Shiro paddling across the (3 km) strait. His feat was so amazing that it gained national recognition and inspired the film: Marilyn ni Aitai (I want to see Marilyn). Marilyn died in 1987, bringing an end to Shiro's seafaring days, and he himself died at the advanced age of 17. There is a statue of Shiro on Nishihama beach (his point of departure) and a similar monument to Marilyn also exists on Zamamijima.

== Further reference ==
- Hayashibara T (1995) Ecological studies on reef-building corals and their sexual reproduction around Akajima Island, Kerama Islands group. PhD thesis, Tokyo University Fisheries, 123 pp. (in Japanese)
- Iwao K (2000) Study on the effect of geographical features on the cause of coral bleaching. In: Research and Development Bureau, Science and Technology Agency (ed.): Report on the Urgent Research on the Mechanism Elucidation of Coral Bleaching, pp. 15–39 (in Japanese)
- Iwao K (2003) Surveys of marine fauna around Kerama Islands by visiting scientists and staff members of AMSL. Midoriishi, 14: 38-41 (in Japanese)
- Iwao K (2004) Kerama Islands. In: Tsuchiya M et al. (eds.): Coral Reefs of Japan. Ministry of the Environment and Japanese Coral Reef Society, Tokyo, pp. 185–189
- Kizaki K (1992) Geological history of the Kerama Islands. Midoriishi, 3: 1-2 (in Japanese) Nadaoka K, Nihei Y, Wakaki K, Kumano R, Kakuma S, Moromizato S, Omija T, Iwao K, Shimoike K, Taniguchi H, Nakano Y, Ikema T (2001) Regional variations of water temperature around Okinawan coasts and its relationship to offshore thermal environments and coral bleaching. Coral Reefs, 20: 373-384
- Ohba H (1995) A list of seaweeds of Akajima Island and its vicinity in Kerama Islands, Okinawa Prefecture, Japan. Midoriishi, 6: 23-28 (in Japanese)
- Omori M and Fujiwara S (eds.) (2003) Manual for the Restoration and Remediation of Coral Reefs. Bureau of Natural Environment, Ministry of the Environment, Tokyo, 84pp.
- Veron JEN (1992) Conservation of biodiversity: a critical time for the hermatypic corals of Japan, Coral Reefs, 11: 13-21
- Zamami Village History Compilation Committee (1989) History of Zamami Village. Vol. 1, Zamami Village Office, Okinawa, 710pp. (in Japanese)
