= Mae Island =

Island in Tokashiki, Okinawa, Japan

Native name: 前島
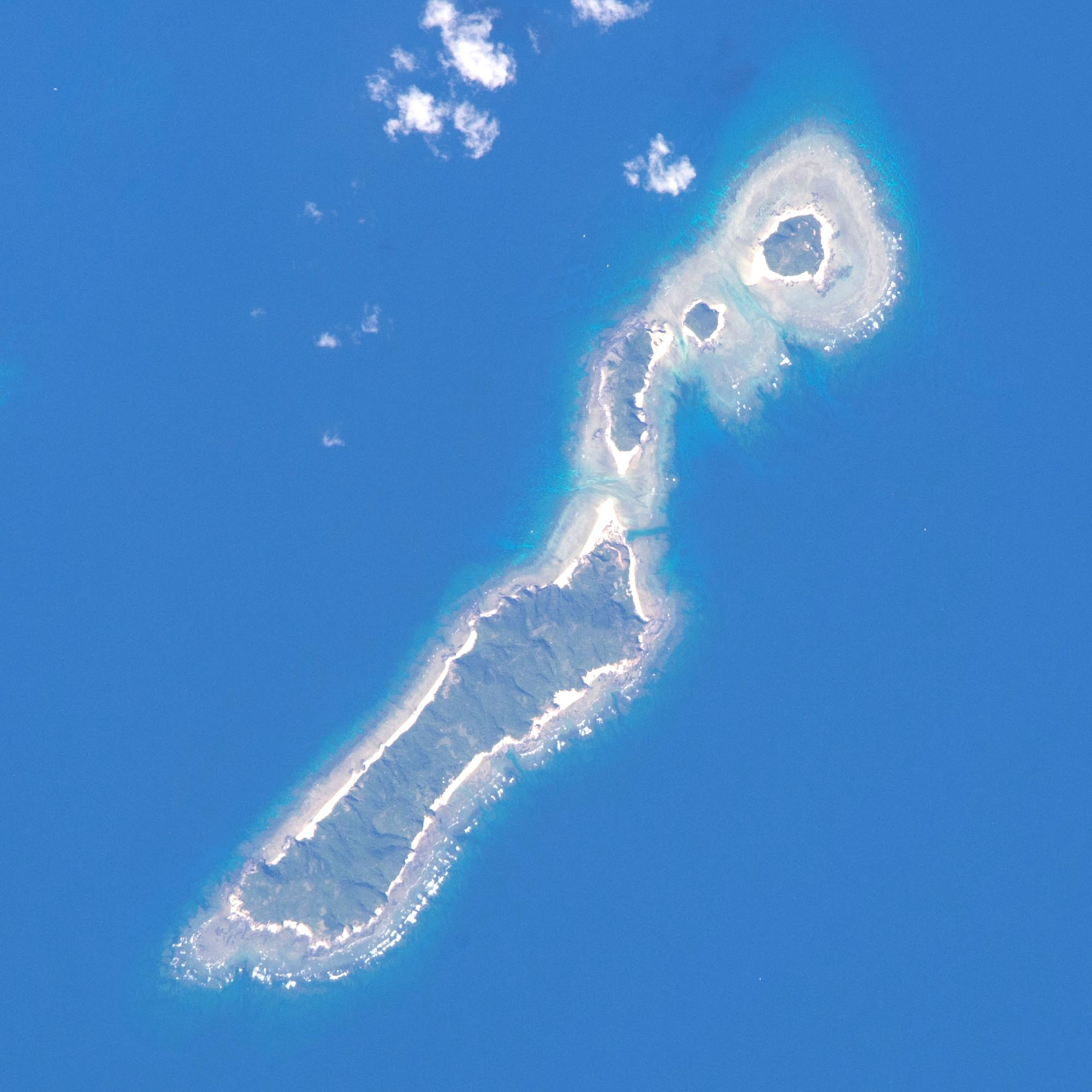
- Interactive map of Mae Island

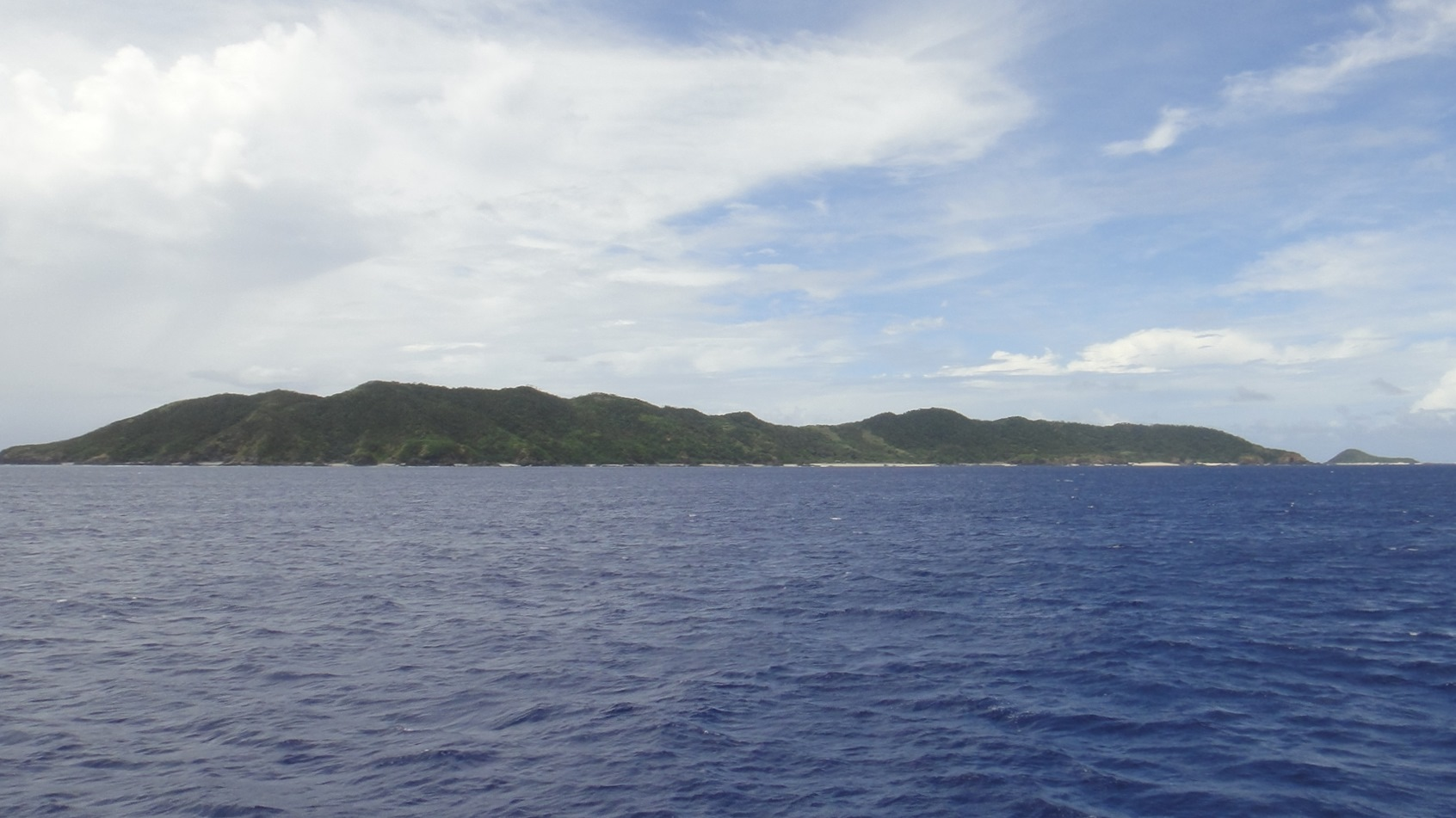
Mae Island

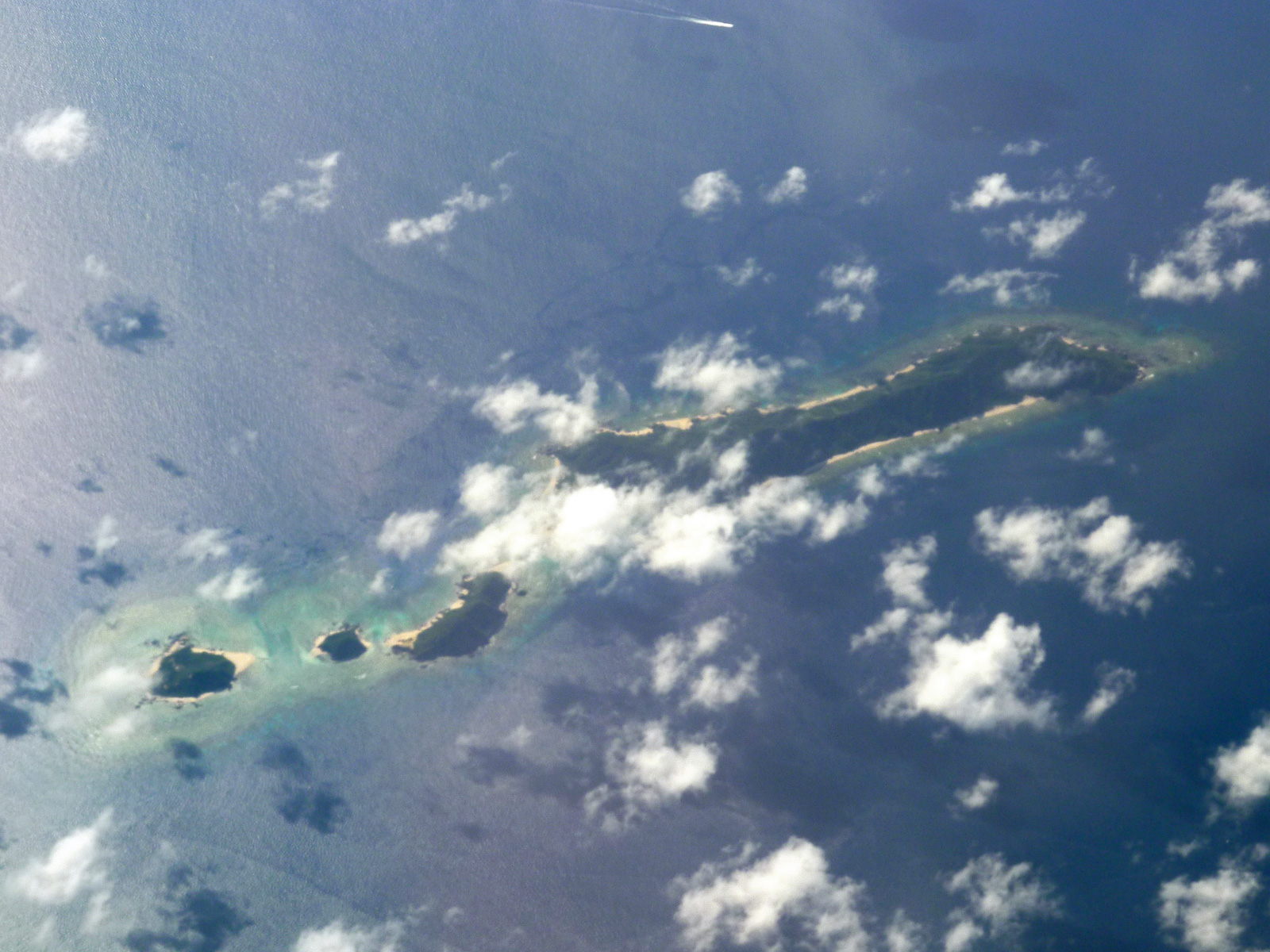
Aerial photo of Mae Island. Bottom left is north.

Maeshima (Japanese: 前島, Hepburn: Mae-shima or Mae-jima; Okinawan: mekirama) is an uninhabited island in Okinawa's Kerama island group. It is controlled by the city of Tokashiki in Shimajiri District.

== Overview ==
It is a narrow, north-south oriented island, located about 7 km east of Tokashiki island.

It gets its name from its location because it is considered the entrance to the Kerama Islands, when traveling from the main island of Okinawa and mae (前) means "front" in Japanese. In the local dialect it is also called mee-jima (メージマ) and meegerama (メーゲラマ). The island is sometimes considered three different islands: Hate-jima in the north, Naka-jima in the middle, and Mae-jima in the south, but the general name for all three islands together is Mae Island.

On January 1, 2017, there were two people living on the island. In October 2019, there was only one resident. Currently, the Okinawa Promotion Special Measures Law treats the island as uninhabited.

There are no regularly scheduled boat or plane trips, but it chartered fishing and diving trips are still common. The entire island and its surrounding waters are part of Kerama Shotō National Park.

There is a sacred site (御嶽, utaki) on the east side of the island called Inrakari (印良苅)

== History ==
Before World War II, the skipjack tuna fishing industry boomed, and around 200 people lived on Mae Island. In 1940, there were 52 households on the island with a total population of 270.

During the Battle of Okinawa, the principal of the island's branch of Tokashiki primary school, who had previously experienced the Shanghai Incident, thought that the enemy would not attack if there were no soldiers. He convinced the third battalion's commander, Captain Suzuki Tsunenaga, who was then stationed at Tokashiki Island, not to station the third battalion on Mae Island. Because there were no Japanese troops located on Mae Island, unlike Tokashiki Island and other Kerama Islands, when American troops landed in March 1945, there was not a single death from attacks or group suicides.

After the war, the population increased to around 380 due to Japanese citizens leaving Micronesia after the South Seas Mandate ended. Development continued on the island, including clean water infrastructure.

The island continued to be uninhabited until 1980, when people started living there again. In 1992, it became uninhabited again, but after that several former families returned to the island and in 2003, there were people living there.

Starting around the year 2000, over 100 training exercises were conducted by the Japanese Air Self Defense Force. The SDF, acting as though they had "perpetual consent", conducted training without notifying Tokashiki city. However, in December 2018, it became clear that they had only been granted permission for using the heliport, and the exercises in other land and sea areas had been conducted without permission.

== Mae Island Training Area ==
In the 1971 Okinawa Reversion Agreement's memorandum of understanding about facilities and boundaries, Mae Island was included in a list of 7 "temporary training areas" that will continue to be provided to the US military, which has become a large problem. The American military had only temporary permission to use these areas, and in the case of Mae Island, from 1969-1970, the US Navy used it for island survival training for only 30 days in the span of a year. The reversion agreement was questioned for continuing to provide access and recognizing areas only temporarily used. Thus, Mae Island, which was not actually an American base, was "reverted" on the day before the Okinawan reversion, May 14, 1972.

The training area is approximately 1.428 km^{2}.

On December 8, 2018, it was confirmed that the Air Self Defense Force's Naha Base had arranged a "perpetual consent" with the city of Tokashiki to conduct training, and had been conducting search and rescue, as well as other training, without notifying the city. In 2000, the Naha base arranged a perpetual consent with the city of Tokashiki and since then more than 100 trainings have been conducted on Mae Island.

== Transportation ==
Chartering a boat from Naha takes about 1.5 hours or 30 minutes from Tokashiki.
