= Kerama Islands =

Island group within Ryukyu Islands

Native name: Kerama-shotō (慶良間諸島)
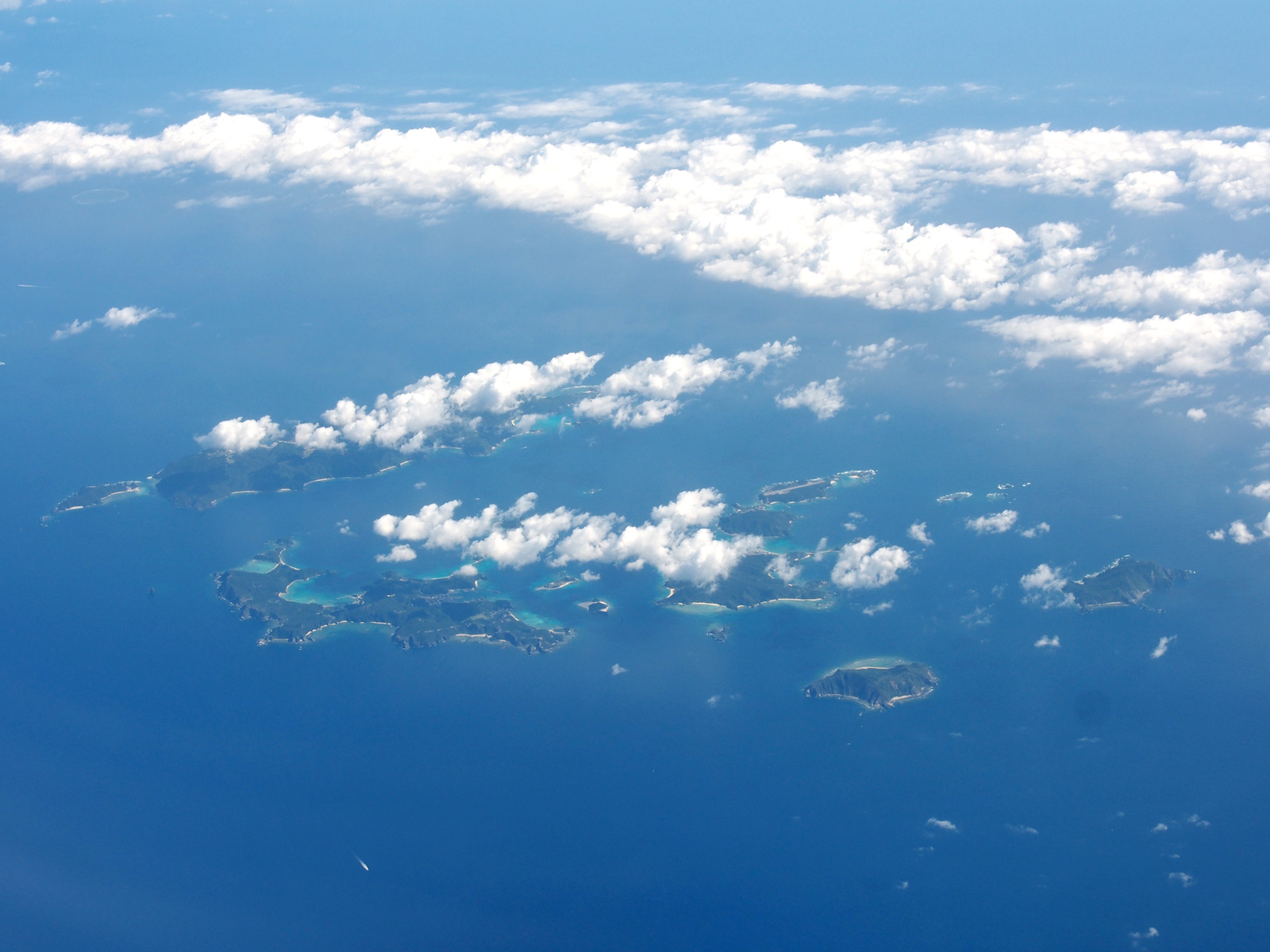

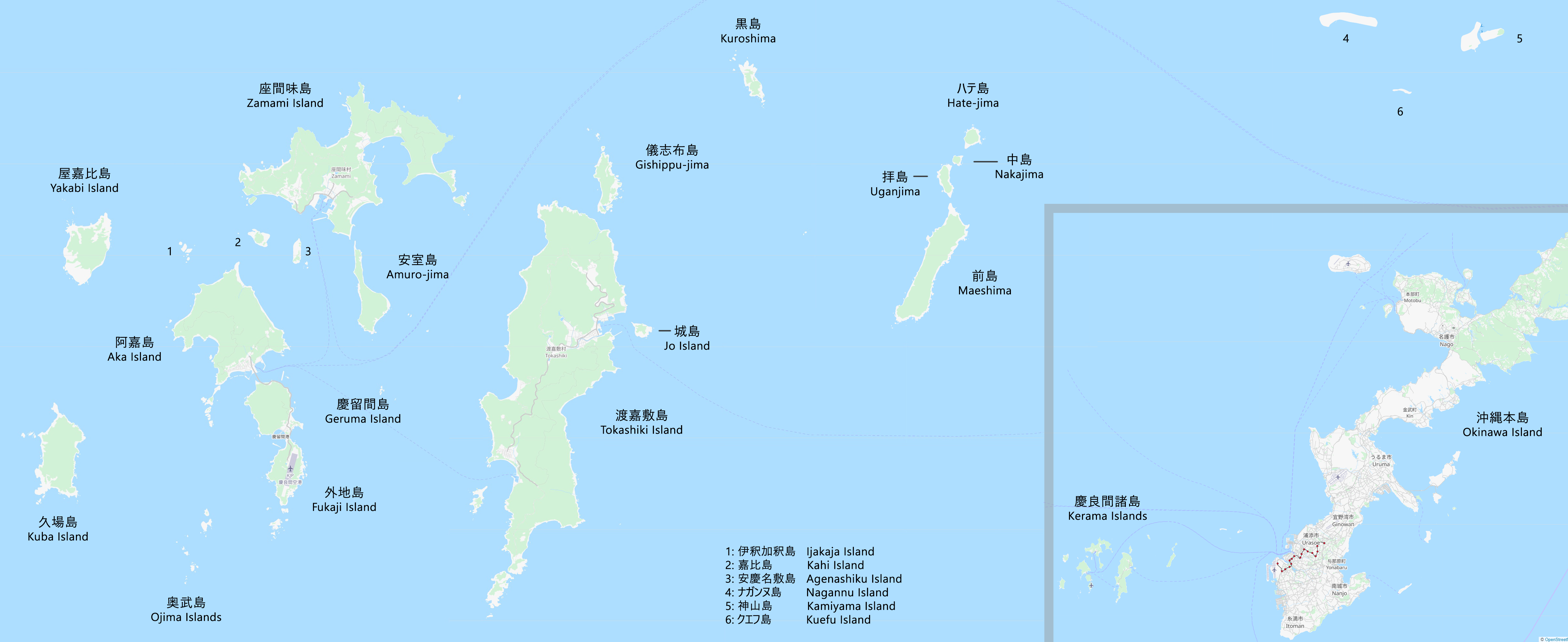
- Map of the Kerama Islands

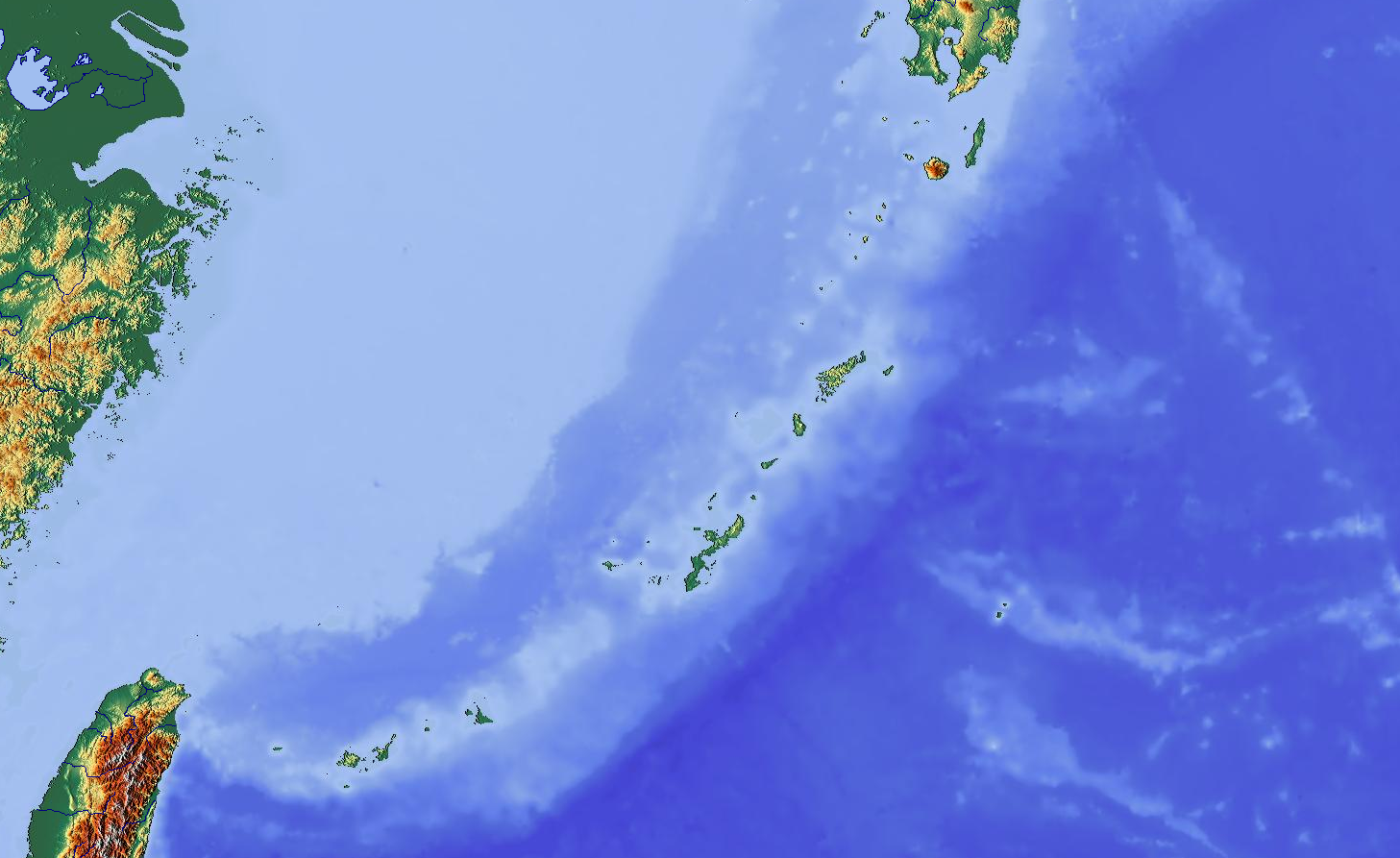
- Location of the Kerama Islands Kerama Islands (Okinawa Prefecture) Kerama Islands (Ryukyu Islands) Kerama Islands (Japan)

Geography
- Location: Pacific Ocean
- Coordinates: 26°12′00″N 127°19′59″E
- Archipelago: Okinawa Islands
- Total islands: 36
- Major islands: Tokashiki Island, Zamami Island
- Area: 35.97 km^{2} (13.89 sq mi)

Administration
- Japan
- Prefecture: Okinawa Prefecture

Demographics
- Population: 1,625 (October 2010)
- Pop. density: 45.2/km^{2} (117.1/sq mi)
- Ethnic groups: Ryukyuan, Japanese

Ramsar Wetland
- Official name: Keramashoto Coral Reef
- Designated: 8 November 2005
- Reference no.: 1546

The Kerama Islands (慶良間諸島, Kerama-shotō; Okinawan: キラマ Kirama) are a subtropical island group 32 kilometres (20 mi) southwest of Okinawa Island in Japan.

== Geography ==
Four islands are inhabited: Tokashiki Island, Zamami Island, Aka Island, and Geruma Island. The islands are administered as Tokashiki Village and Zamami Village within Shimajiri District. The Kerama-shotō coral reef is a Ramsar Site.

The archipelago consists of the following islands (-jima/-shima) – inhabited ones are highlighted in blue – and rocks (other suffixes, unnamed entries) with an area of at least 0.01 km^{2}.

Photo	Name		Size (km^{2})	Height (m)	Group	Coordinates
Photo	English	Japanese	Size (km^{2})	Height (m)	Group	Coordinates
	Tokashiki Island	渡嘉敷島	15.31	227.3	Tokashiki	26.186667°N 127.355556°E
	Zamami Island	座間味島	6.66	160.7	Zamami	26.234444°N 127.3075°E
	Aka Island	阿嘉島	3.82	165.0	Zamami	26.198889°N 127.278056°E
Maeshima (unterste Insel)	Mae Island	前島	1.60	132.8	Tokashiki	26.212222°N 127.447222°E
	Kuba-shima	久場島	1.55	270.1	Zamami	26.171389°N 127.237778°E
	Yakabi-jima	屋嘉比島	1.26	214.4	Zamami	26.216389°N 127.244444°E
	Geruma Island	慶留間島	1.15	157.3	Zamami	26.181667°N 127.289167°E
	Fukaji Island	外地島	0.83	76	Zamami	26.168333°N 127.292778°E
	Amuro-jima	安室島	0.73	98.8	Zamami	26.207222°N 127.311111°E
	Gishippu-jima	儀志布島	0.49	113.6	Tokashiki	26.230278°N 127.369444°E
	Kuroshima	黒島	0.27	126.1	Tokashiki	26.251667°N 127.404167°E
	Un-jima	ウン島	0.26	87	Tokashiki	26.142778°N 127.343056°E
	Gahi-jima	嘉比島	0.13	51	Zamami	26.218333°N 127.286111°E
	Gusukushima	城島	0.11	105.9	Tokashiki	26.198611°N 127.377778°E
	Hanari-jima	離島	0.10	59.2	Tokashiki	26.161667°N 127.338333°E
	Agenashiku-jima	安慶名敷島	0.10	41.6	Zamami	26.215278°N 127.295°E
	Sunashiru-jima	砂白島	0.05	28	Zamami	26.184167°N 127.274722°E
Kuba-iwa, Ou-jima, Naka-iwa und Yubu-iwa (von oben nach unten)	Ou-jima (Ubu-iwa)	奥武島(うぶ岩)	0.05	45.6	Zamami	26.156667°N 127.273333°E
Kuba-iwa, Ou-jima, Naka-iwa und Yubu-iwa (von oben nach unten)	Kuba-iwa	くば岩	0.01	14	Zamami	26.159167°N 127.273056°E
Kuba-iwa, Ou-jima, Naka-iwa und Yubu-iwa (von oben nach unten)	Yubu-iwa	ゆぶ岩	0.01	34	Zamami	26.147222°N 127.269722°E
Kuba-iwa, Ou-jima, Naka-iwa und Yubu-iwa (von oben nach unten)	Naka-iwa	なか岩	0.01	17	Zamami	26.150278°N 127.268333°E
	Achirāne-iwa	アチラーネ岩	0.05	–	Zamami	
	Mokaraku-jima	モカラク島	0.04	25	Zamami	26.156111°N 127.289722°E
	Tsumishiro-shima	積城島	0.02	–	Zamami	26.181111°N 127.273611°E
	Ijakaja-jima	伊釈迦釈島	0.02	56	Zamami	26.215556°N 127.268333°E
	Jinojitsuru-jima	地自津留島	0.01	54	Tokashiki	26.237778°N 127.368611°E
	Sakuhara no Hana	佐久原の鼻	0.01	–	Zamami	26.178333°N 127.274167°E
	Fukakane-se	ふかかね瀬	0.01	47	Zamami	26.175833°N 127.229028°E
	unnamed		0.01	–	Zamami	26.183333°N 127.2725°E
	unnamed		0.01	–	Zamami	26.159444°N 127.291944°E

=== Beaches ===
These are notable beaches of the Kerama Islands:

Notable beaches
Name	Island	Japanese name
Aharen Beach	Tokashiki Island	阿波連ビーチ（渡嘉敷島）
Tokashiku Beach	Tokashiki Island	渡嘉志久ビーチ（渡嘉敷島）
Ama Beach	Zamami Island	阿真ビーチ（座間味島）
Furuzamami Beach	Zamami Island	古座間味ビーチ（座間味島）
Kitahama Beach	Aka Island	北浜ビーチ（阿嘉島）

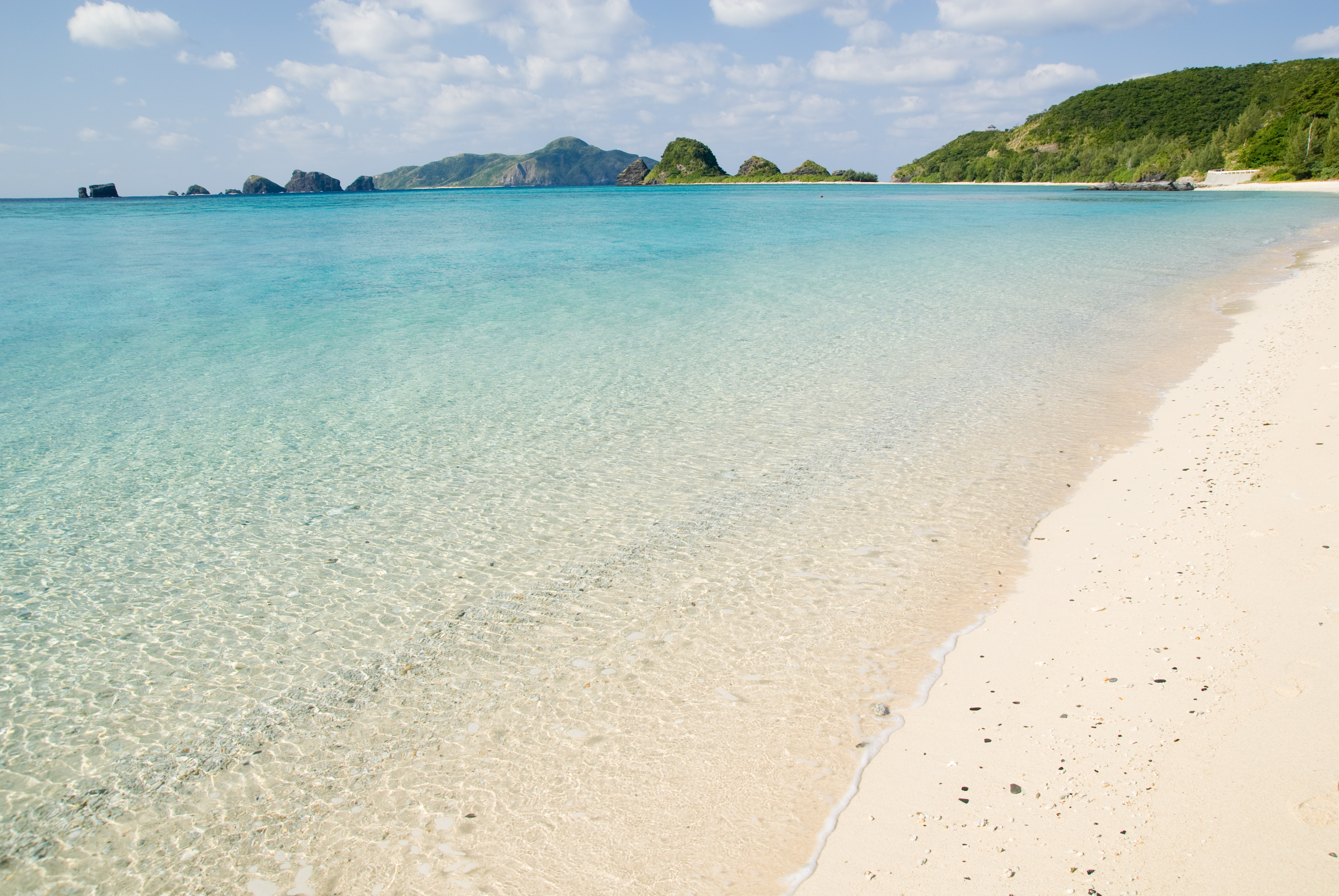
Ama beach in Zamami island

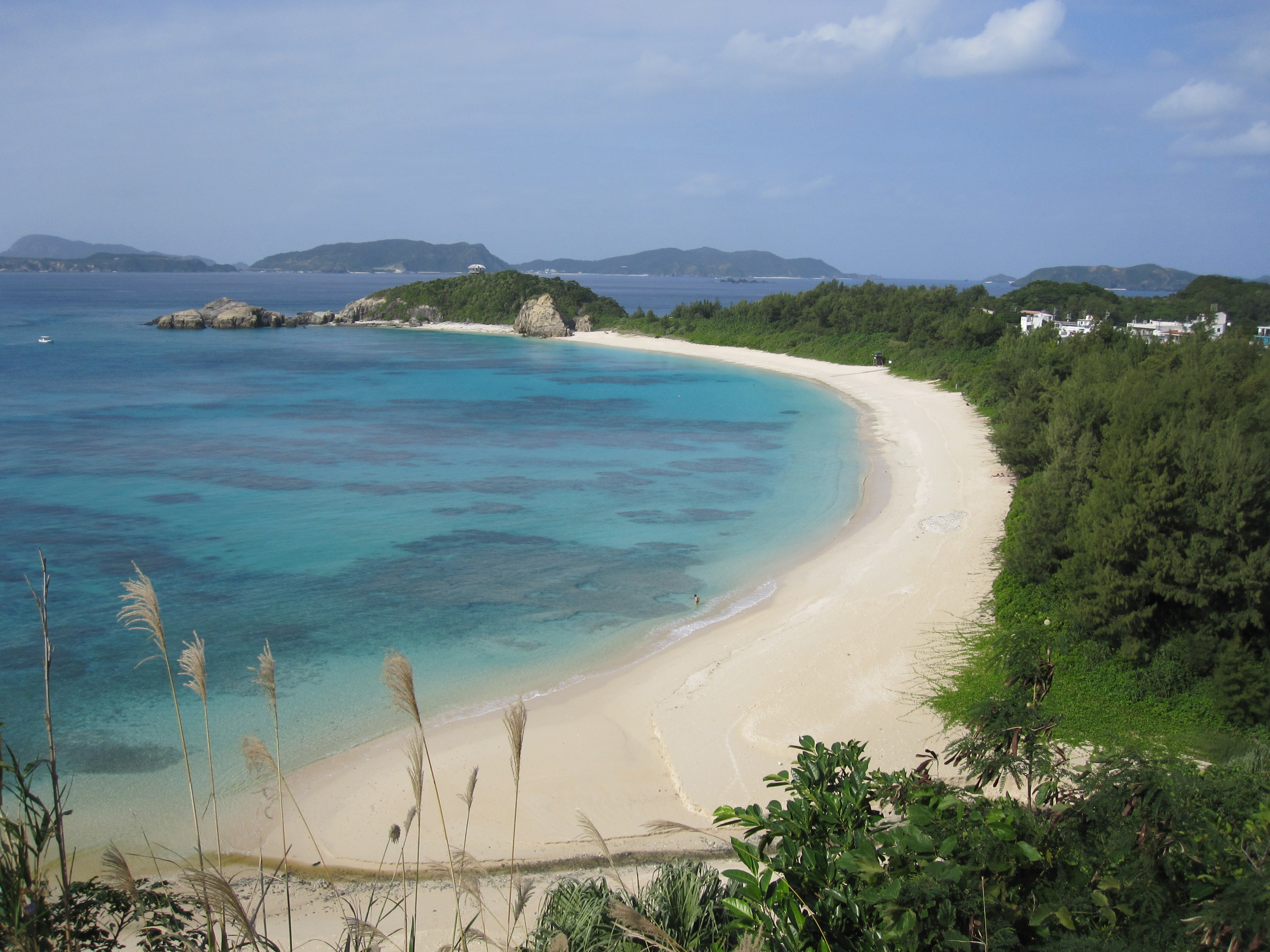
Aharen Beach on Tokashiki Island

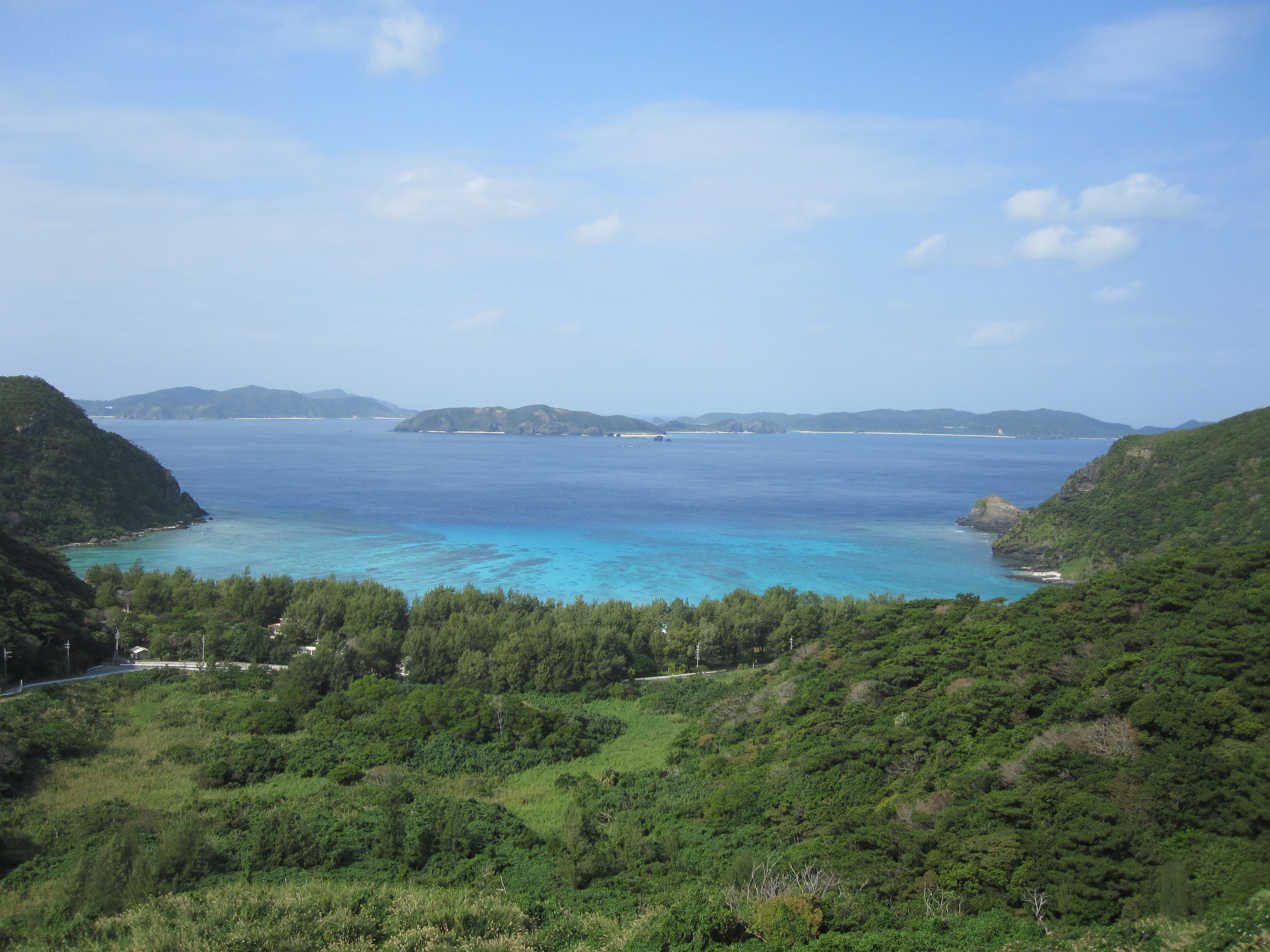
Tokashiku beach on Tokashiki Island

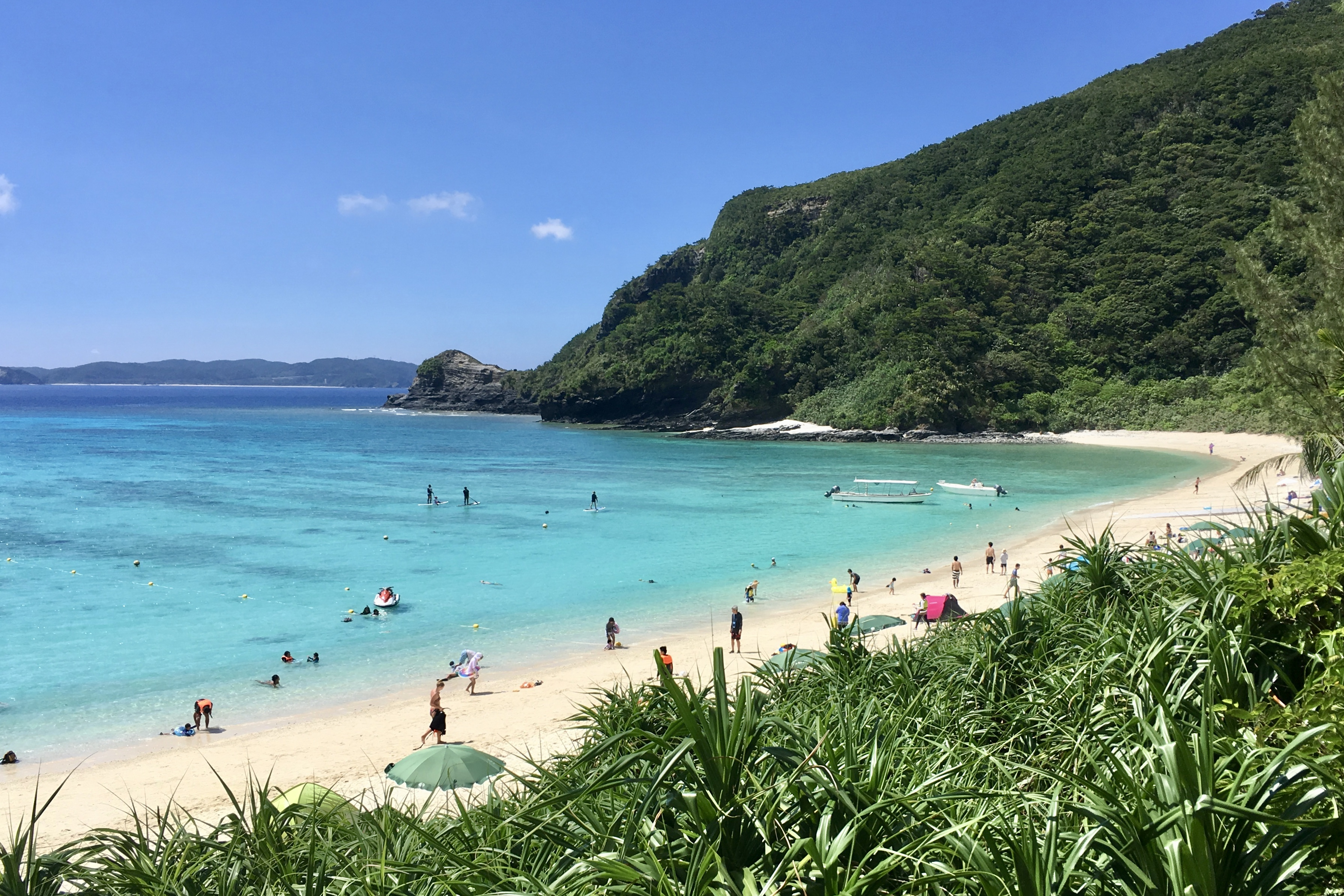
Tokashiku beach

== Flora ==
The archipelago has several extensive coral reefs. Two of them were designated as Ramsar sites in November 2005: a 120-hectare area along the west coast of Tokashiki-jima and around Hanari-jima, and a 233-hectare area around Ijakaja-jima, Gahi-jima and Agenashiku-jima, i.e., between Aka Island and Zamami Island. These reefs are home to 248 different coral species, most notably of the Acropora genus. On March 5, 2014, the waters and the islands were placed under protection as Kerama Shotō National Park.

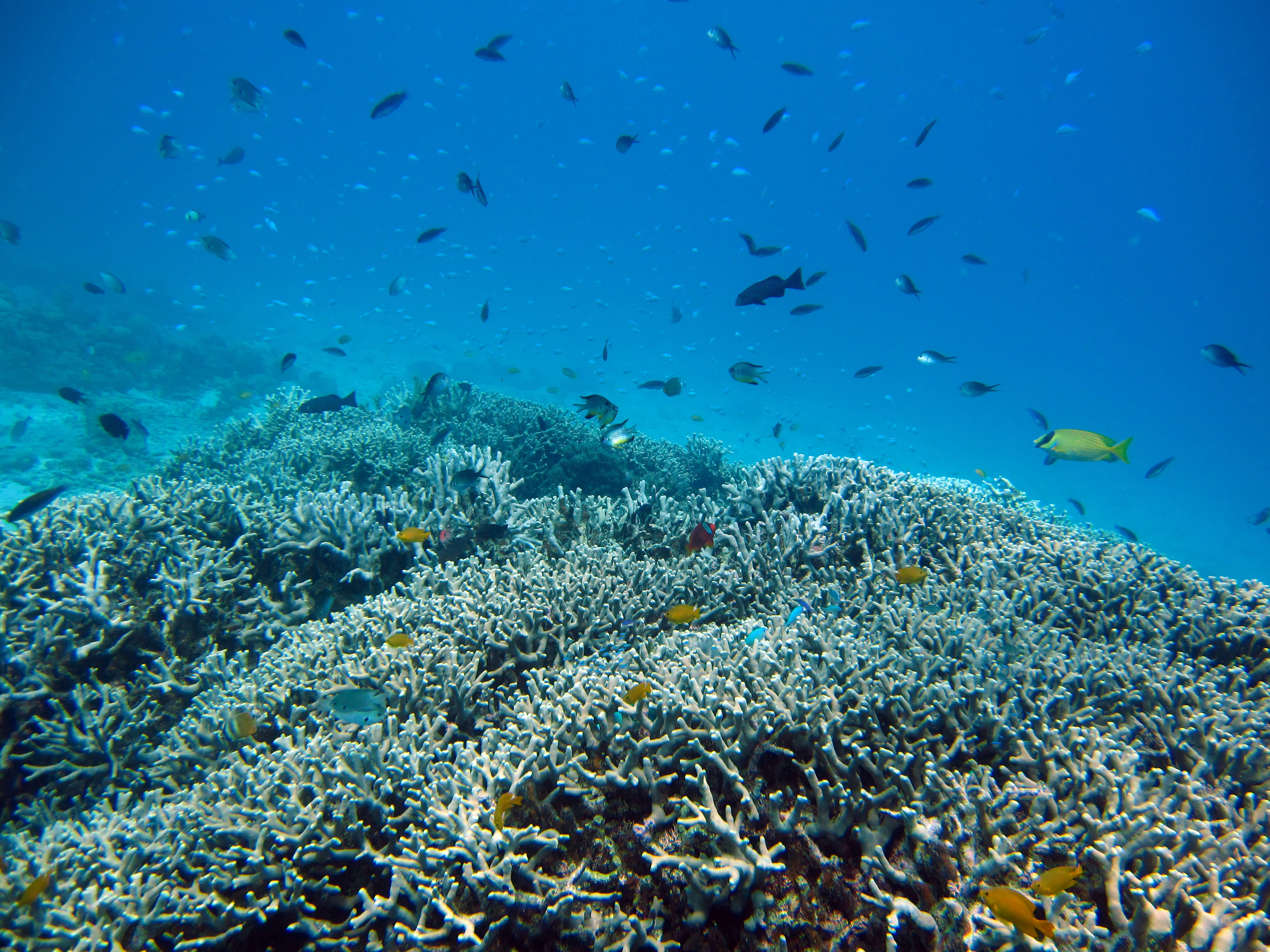
Coral reef, Aka island

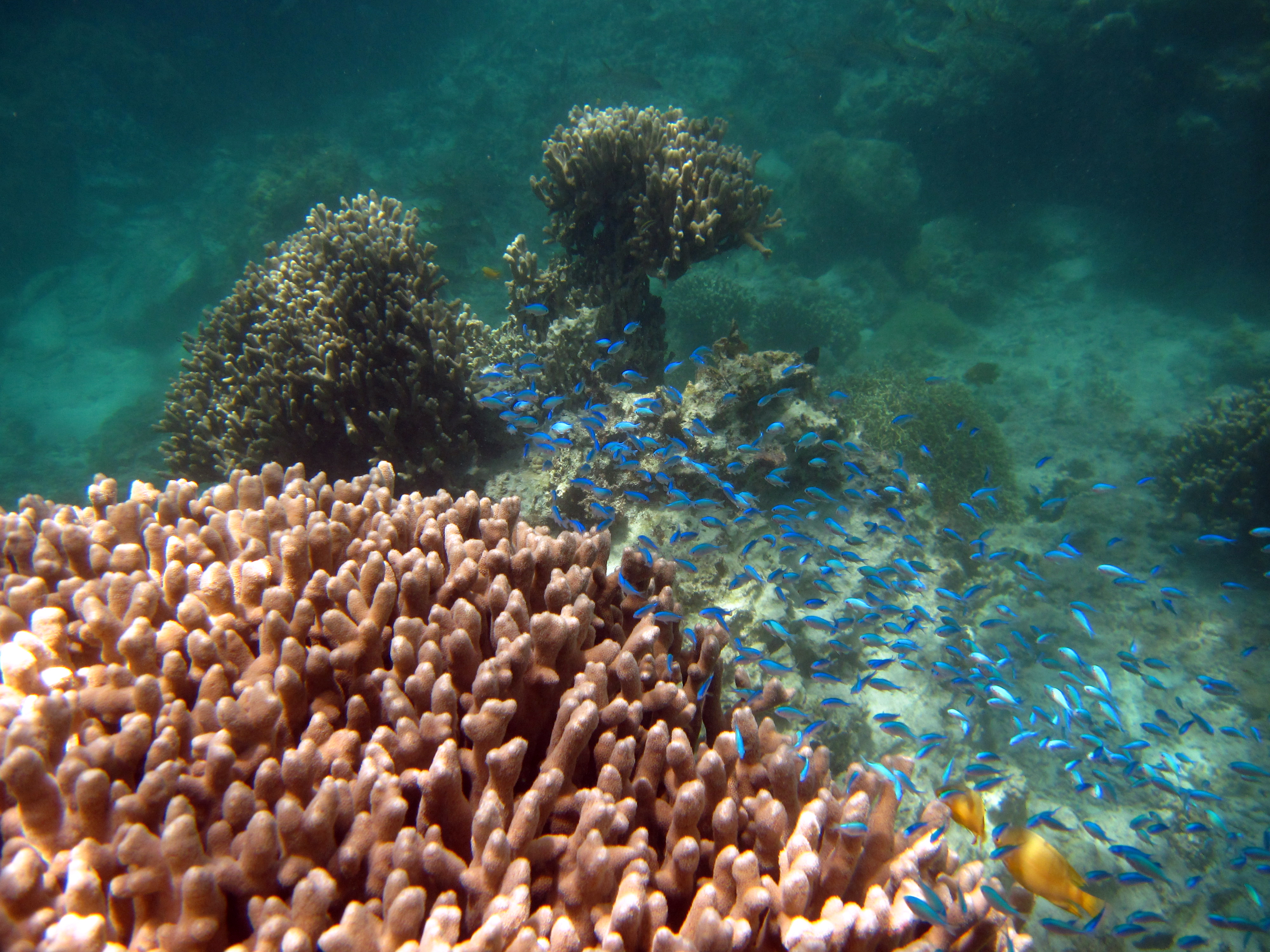
Coral reef, Aka island

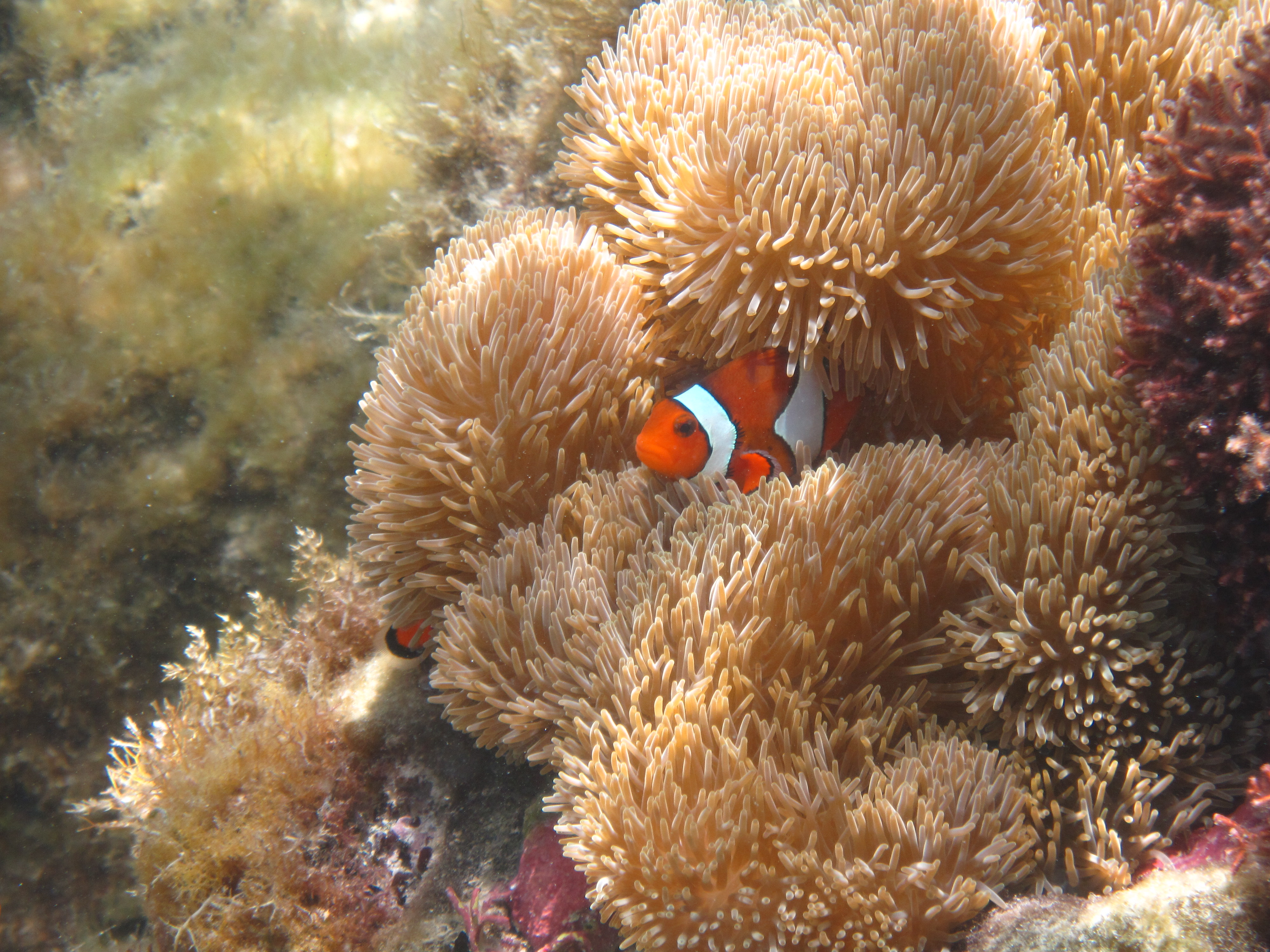
Clownfish, Aka island

== Fauna ==
The islands of Aka, Fukaji, Geruma and Yakabi provide the sole natural habitat of the endangered Kerama deer (Cervus nippon keramae), thought to be an introduced population of the Japanese sika deer in the early 17th century that has since adapted to their island environment.

== History ==
The Kerama islands were historically part of the Ryukyu Kingdom (1429–1879), when islanders were employed as navigators on the kingdom’s trading vessels to China.

During World War II and preliminary to the Battle of Okinawa, soldiers of the 77th Infantry Division landed in the Kerama Islands on March 26, 1945. Further landings followed, and the Kerama group was secured over the next five days. Kerama was used as a staging area for the assault on Okinawa. During the battle the first civilian mass suicides that later marked the Battle of Okinawa took place. The first US Navy ship to anchor in the harbor was USS Makin Island, a small "jeep" carrier.

Thereafter, the archipelago, like the rest of the Ryukyu Islands, was under US military administration before being returned to Japan in 1972.

The Kerama islands was the site of a true story about romance between two dogs who lived on neighboring islands that was made into the 1988 Japanese film I Want to See Marilyn (Marilyn ni Aitai). It is now a popular beach and diving destination for visitors to Okinawa.

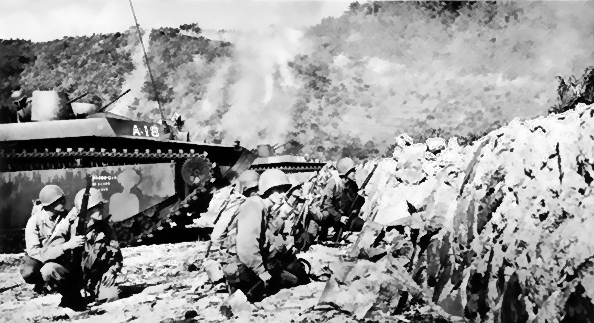
The 77th Infantry Division on Zamami Island during World War II

== Transportation ==
The Kerama Islands are served by the Kerama Airport, located on Fukaji Island. Regular ferries are also available from Naha to the three largest islands, Aka, Zamami, and Tokashiki. Ferries between the islands are also available, as are boat tours.
