= Geruma Island =

Island within Ryukyu Islands

Native name: 慶留間島 (Giruma)
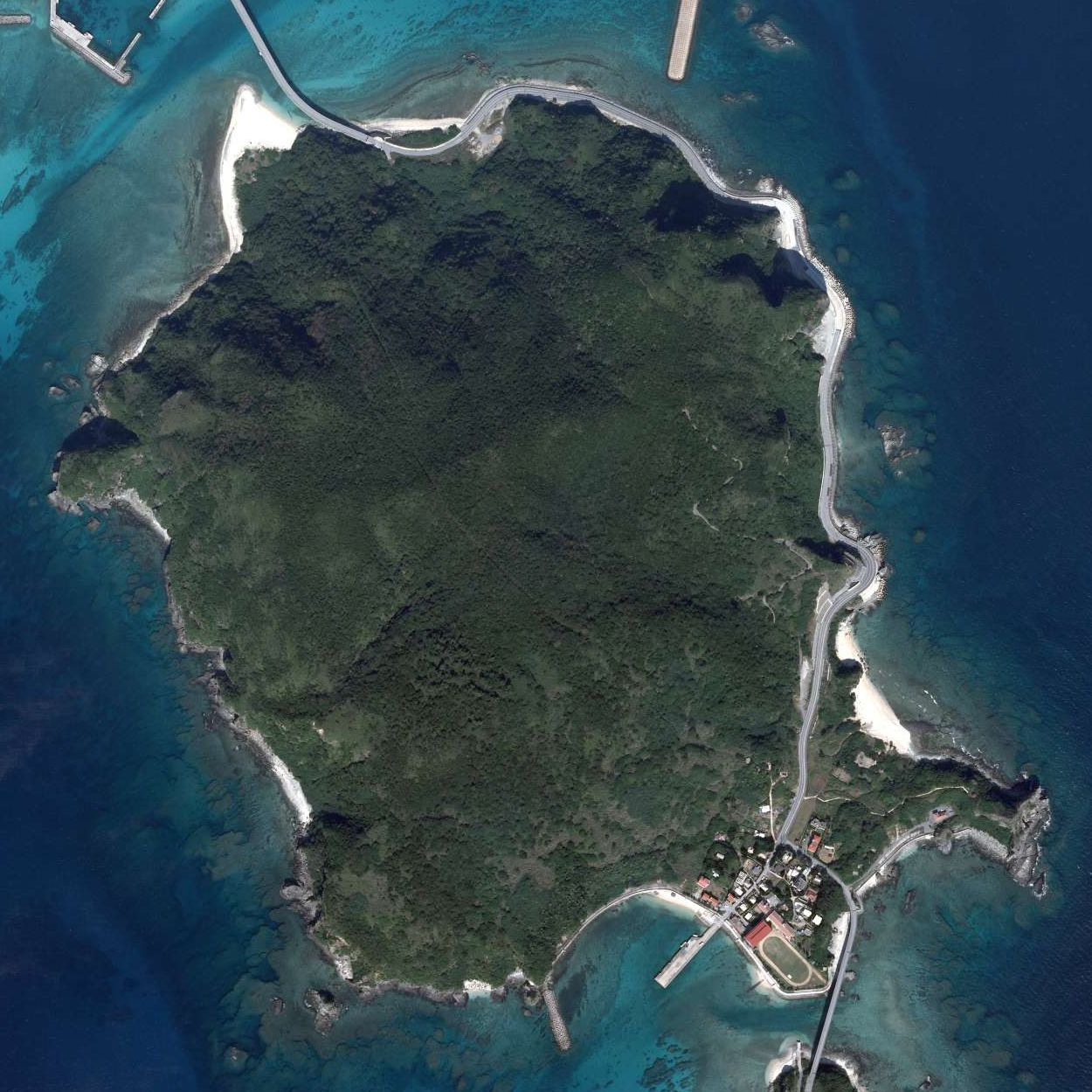
- Aerial view of Geruma Island

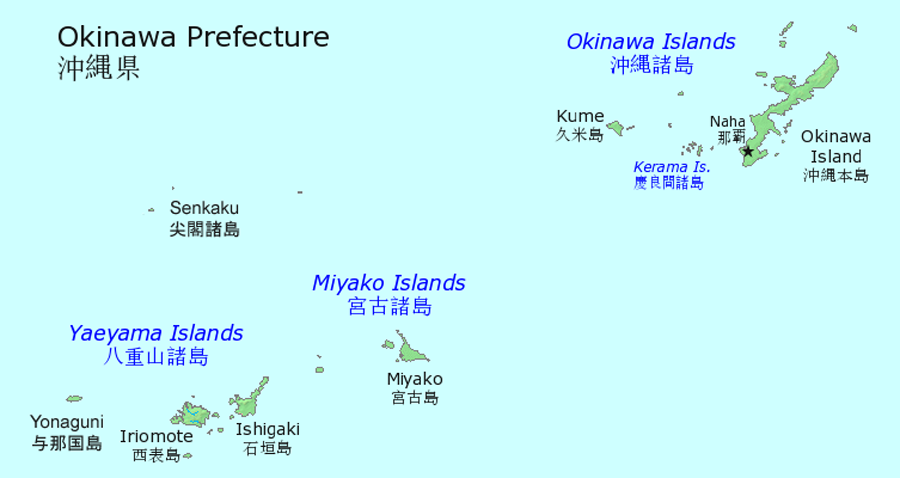

Geography
- Location: Pacific Ocean
- Coordinates: 26°10′53″N 127°17′21″E
- Archipelago: Kerama Islands

Administration
- Japan
- Prefecture: Okinawa Prefecture

Demographics
- Ethnic groups: Ryukyuan, Japanese

Geruma Island (慶留間島, Okinawan:Giruma)is an island in the Pacific Ocean. It is part of the Kerama Islands group in Shimajiri District, Okinawa Prefecture, Japan. This small island is linked by a bridge to Fukaji and Aka islands.
