= Tokashiki Island =

Island within Ryukyu Islands

Native name: Tukasiti
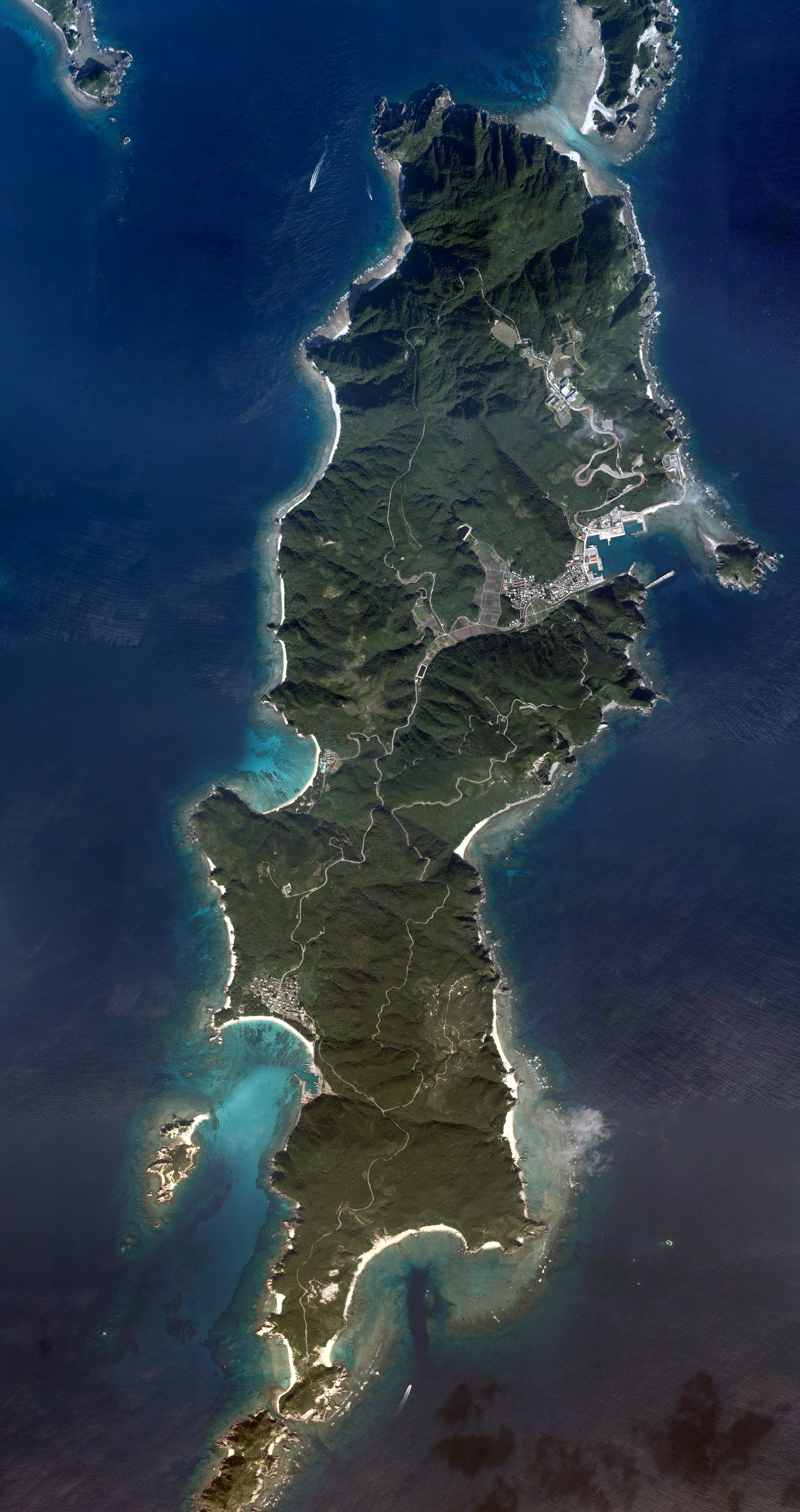
- Tokashiki Island

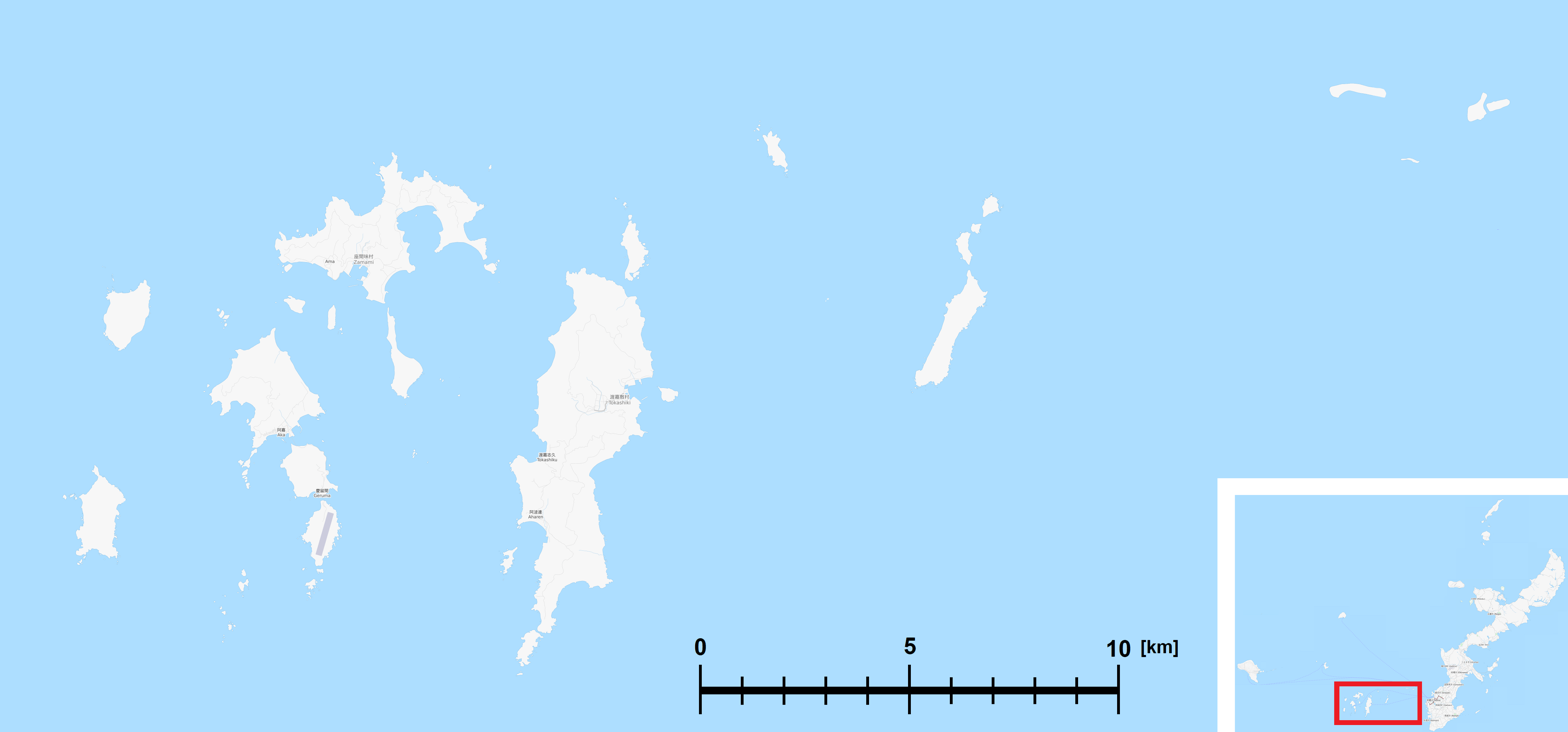
- Map of Kerama Islands; Tokashiki is largest in the center

Geography
- Location: Pacific Ocean
- Coordinates: 26°11′52″N 127°21′52″E
- Archipelago: Kerama Islands

Administration
- Japan
- Prefecture: Okinawa Prefecture
- Largest settlement: Tokashiki

Demographics
- Ethnic groups: Ryukyuan, Japanese

Tokashiki Island (渡嘉敷島, Tokashiki-jima; Okinawan: Tukasiti) is the largest of the Kerama Islands, a group of Japanese islands southwest of Okinawa in the Pacific Ocean. The island is administered from the village of Tokashiki in Shimajiri District, Okinawa Prefecture, Japan.

== Geography ==
Tokashiki is a hilly island of about 15.29 square kilometers with sheer cliffs which descend down to the seas.

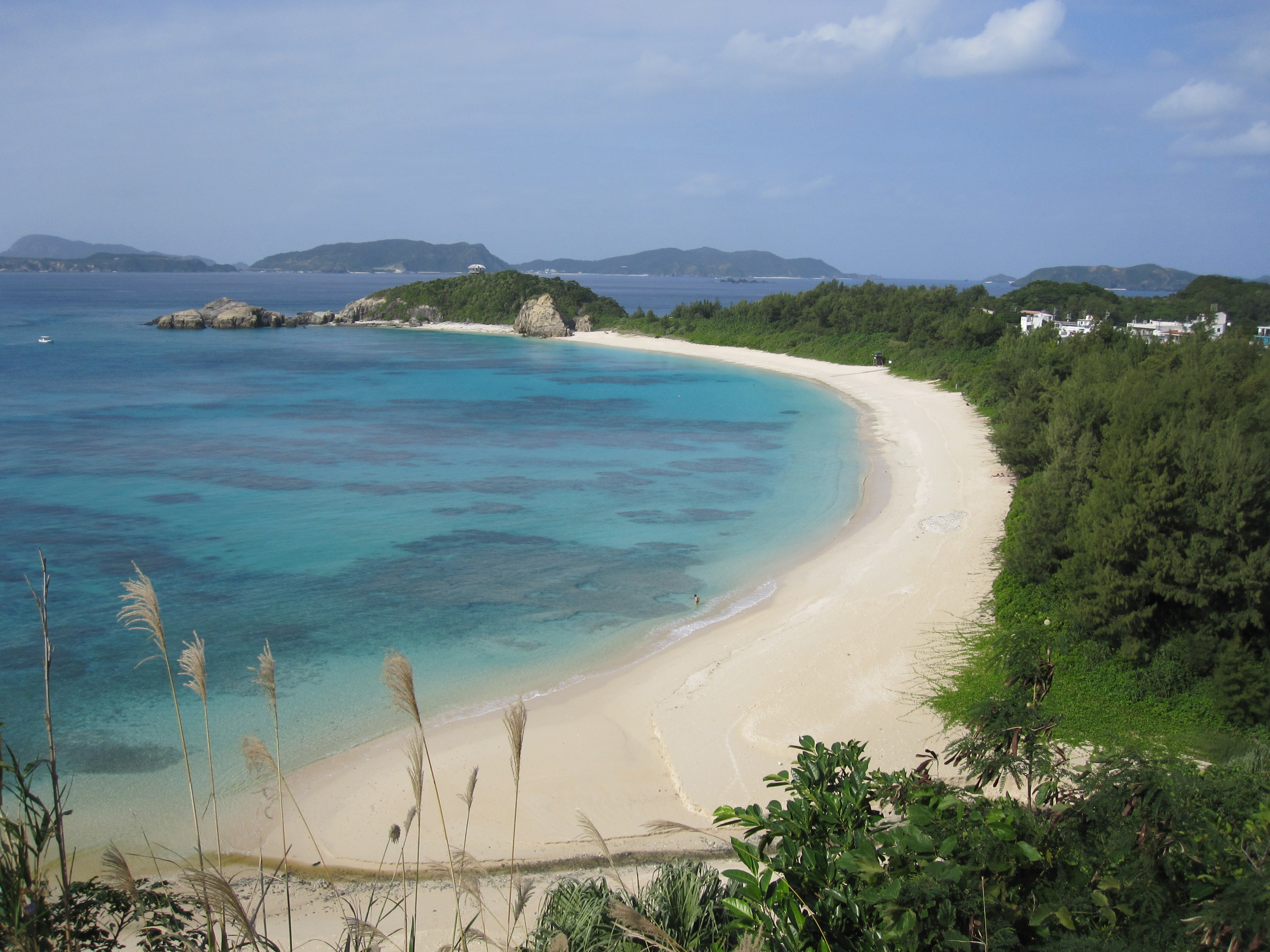
Aharen beach on Tokashiki island

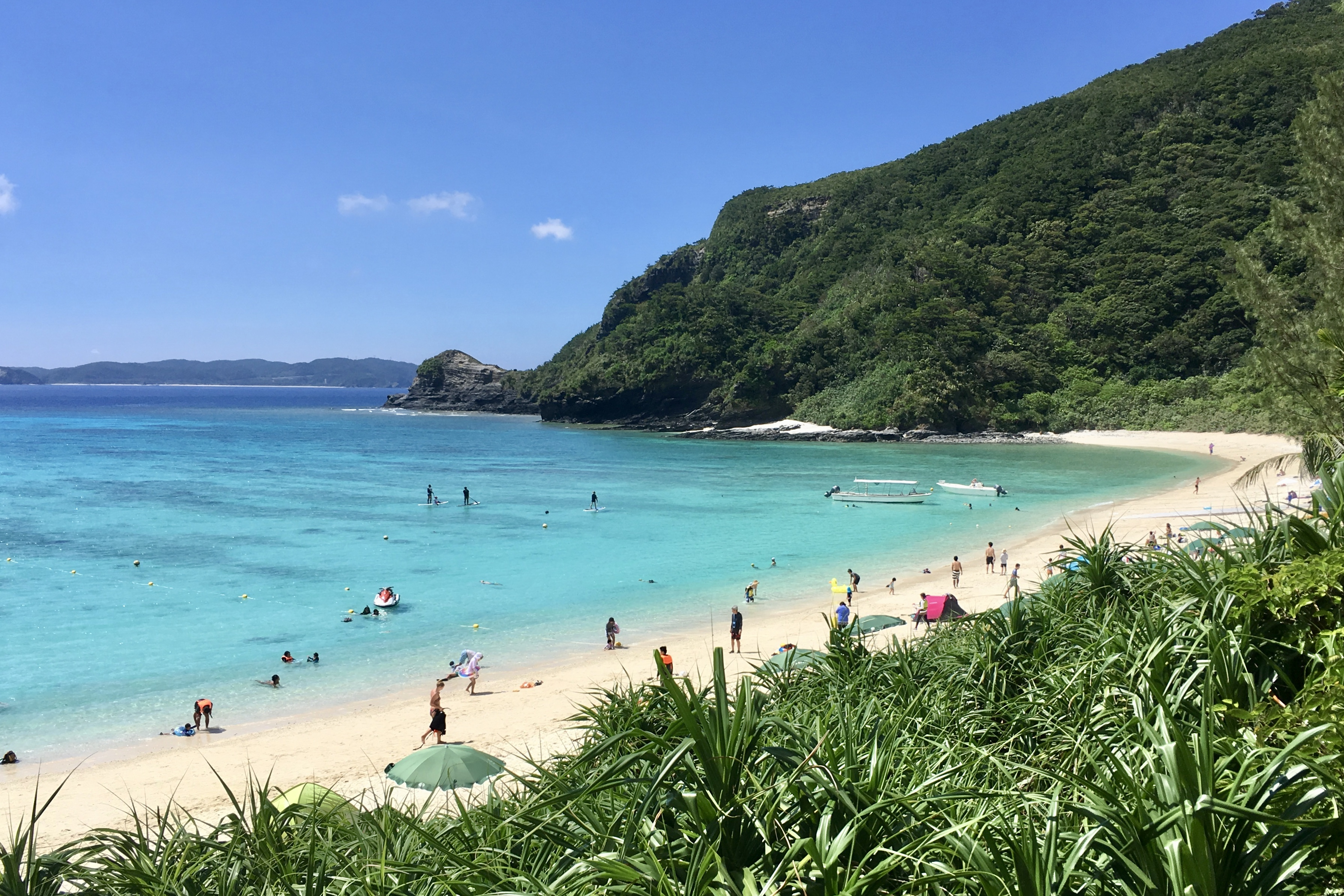
Tokashiku beach

== Climate ==
The climate is warm year-round with a daily mean of 21 Celsius. It has 1,938 hours of sunshine per year, but it can get cloudy in December through February.

Climate data for Tokashiki (1991−2020 normals, extremes 1977−present)
Month	Jan	Feb	Mar	Apr	May	Jun	Jul	Aug	Sep	Oct	Nov	Dec	Year
Record high °C (°F)	24.1 (75.4)	24.6 (76.3)	25.7 (78.3)	26.7 (80.1)	29.1 (84.4)	30.7 (87.3)	32.1 (89.8)	32.5 (90.5)	31.7 (89.1)	30.4 (86.7)	28.4 (83.1)	26.8 (80.2)	32.5 (90.5)
Mean daily maximum °C (°F)	17.8 (64.0)	18.1 (64.6)	19.7 (67.5)	22.0 (71.6)	24.6 (76.3)	27.5 (81.5)	29.3 (84.7)	29.3 (84.7)	28.3 (82.9)	25.8 (78.4)	22.8 (73.0)	19.5 (67.1)	23.7 (74.7)
Daily mean °C (°F)	15.6 (60.1)	15.7 (60.3)	17.2 (63.0)	19.5 (67.1)	22.2 (72.0)	25.1 (77.2)	26.9 (80.4)	26.8 (80.2)	25.8 (78.4)	23.5 (74.3)	20.7 (69.3)	17.4 (63.3)	21.4 (70.5)
Mean daily minimum °C (°F)	13.8 (56.8)	13.8 (56.8)	15.2 (59.4)	17.6 (63.7)	20.4 (68.7)	23.4 (74.1)	25.2 (77.4)	25.1 (77.2)	24.1 (75.4)	21.9 (71.4)	19.1 (66.4)	15.7 (60.3)	19.6 (67.3)
Record low °C (°F)	3.7 (38.7)	6.0 (42.8)	5.5 (41.9)	10.4 (50.7)	14.0 (57.2)	15.3 (59.5)	19.9 (67.8)	21.6 (70.9)	17.7 (63.9)	16.1 (61.0)	9.5 (49.1)	7.6 (45.7)	3.7 (38.7)
Average precipitation mm (inches)	134.2 (5.28)	129.2 (5.09)	170.3 (6.70)	194.9 (7.67)	269.1 (10.59)	284.8 (11.21)	154.7 (6.09)	208.8 (8.22)	234.6 (9.24)	157.4 (6.20)	120.9 (4.76)	135.8 (5.35)	2,200.5 (86.63)
Average precipitation days (≥ 1.0 mm)	12.1	11.3	13.0	11.8	12.4	11.7	8.4	11.0	11.7	8.6	9.1	10.9	132
Mean monthly sunshine hours	89.9	97.6	124.0	135.6	163.7	188.8	274.0	248.2	207.1	180.0	126.1	105.8	1,938.4
Source: Japan Meteorological Agency

== Transportation ==
Tokashiki port is connected to Naha by ferry. But the small Mitshushima ferry also connect the Aharen port to Zamami and Aka.
