= Kerama Shotō National Park =

Japanese national park

- 慶良間諸島国立公園
- IUCN category II (national park)
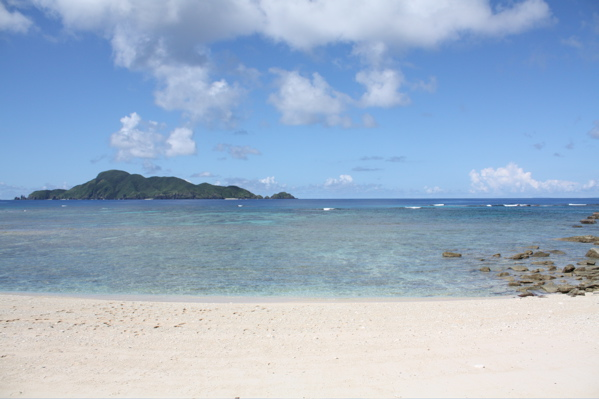

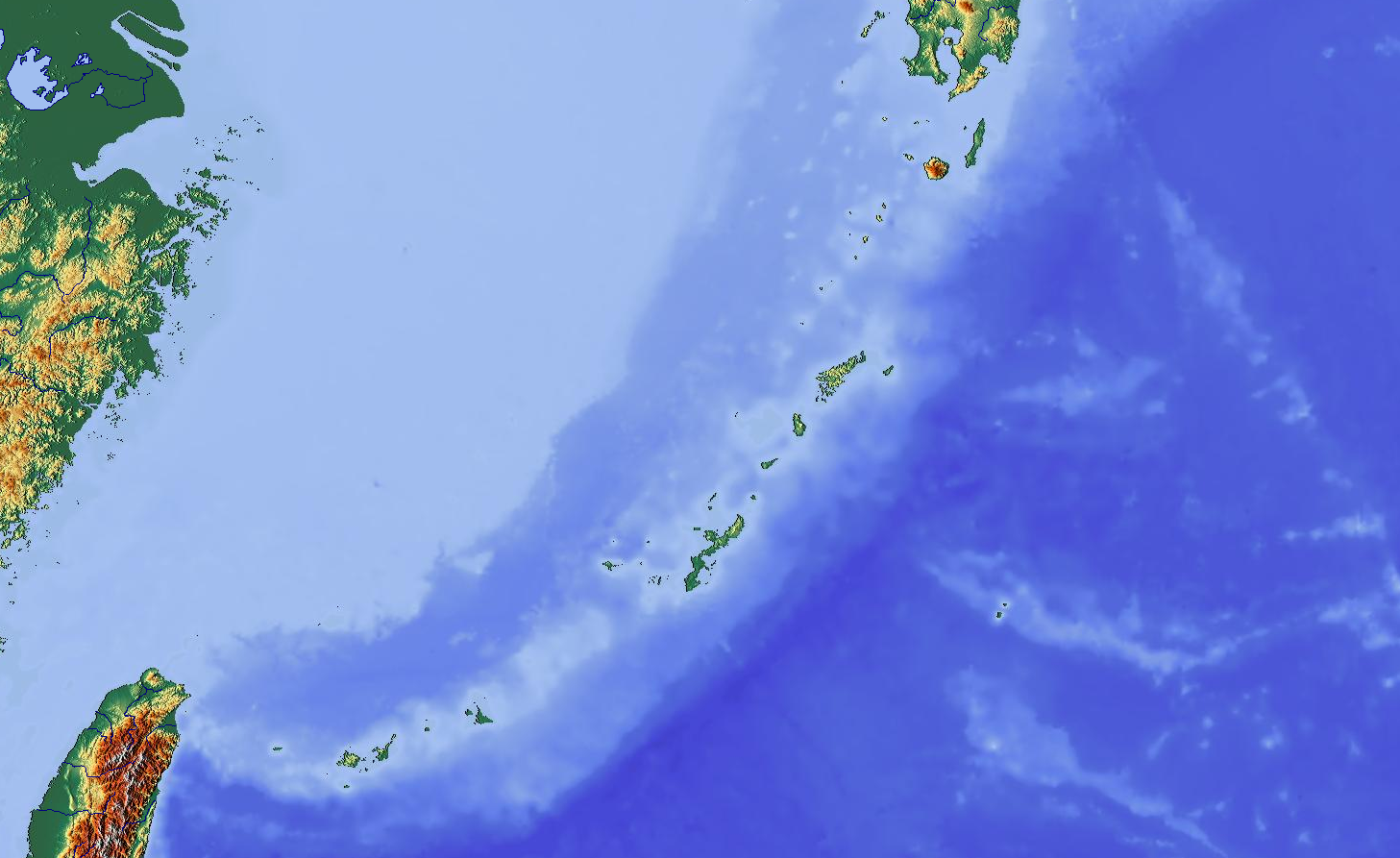
- Location within Ryukyu Islands Location within Japan
- Location: Kerama Islands, Okinawa, Japan
- Coordinates: 26°2′N 127°33′E
- Area: 939.95 km^{2} (362.92 sq mi)
- Established: 5 March 2014
- Governing body: Ministry of the Environment (Japan)

Kerama Shotō National Park (慶良間諸島国立公園, Kerama Shotō Kokuritsu Kōen) is a national park in Okinawa Prefecture, Japan. Established in 2014, it is located in and around the Kerama Islands. The park comprises a land area of 3,520 ha (8,700 acres) in the municipalities of Tokashiki and Zamami together with 90,475 ha (223,570 acres) of the surrounding waters. The Kerama Islands previously formed part of Okinawa Kaigan Quasi-National Park. The day of establishment, March 5, coincides with Coral Day (サンゴの日).

== Nature ==
Kerama Shoto has forests and coral reefs. The reefs are home to 248 species of reef-building corals. The islands also have over 620 native plants, including 46 species of trees, such as Ryukyu pines and fan palms. Some notable and rare species found here are green sea turtles, humpback whales, Ryukyu robins, sword-tail newt, Ryukyu black-breasted leaf turtle, and Kerama deer.

== See also ==
- List of national parks of Japan
