= Fukaji Island =

Uninhabited island in the Kerama Islands, Okinawa, Japan

Native name: 外地島 (Fukaji-jima)
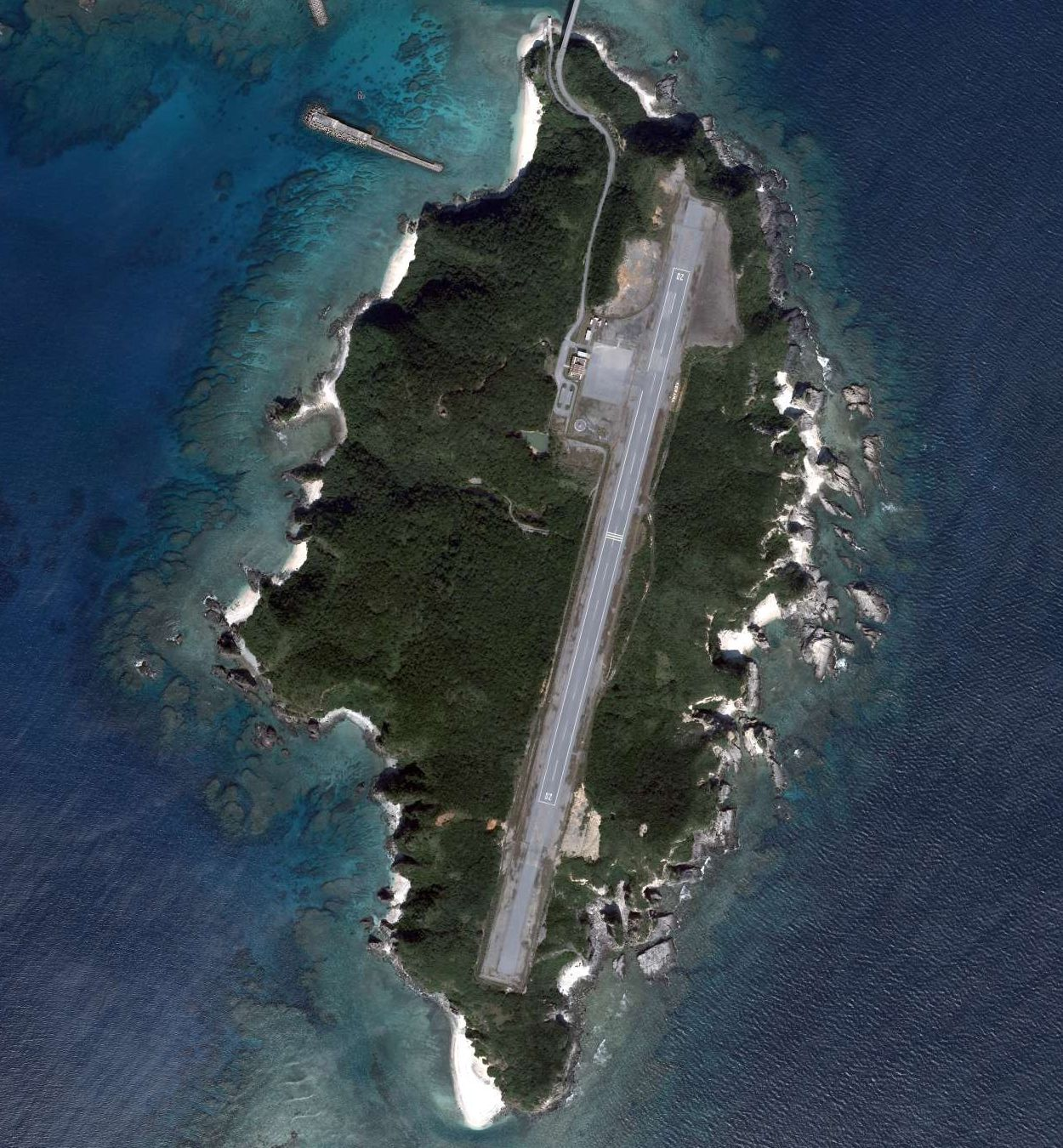
- Aerial view of Fukaji Island

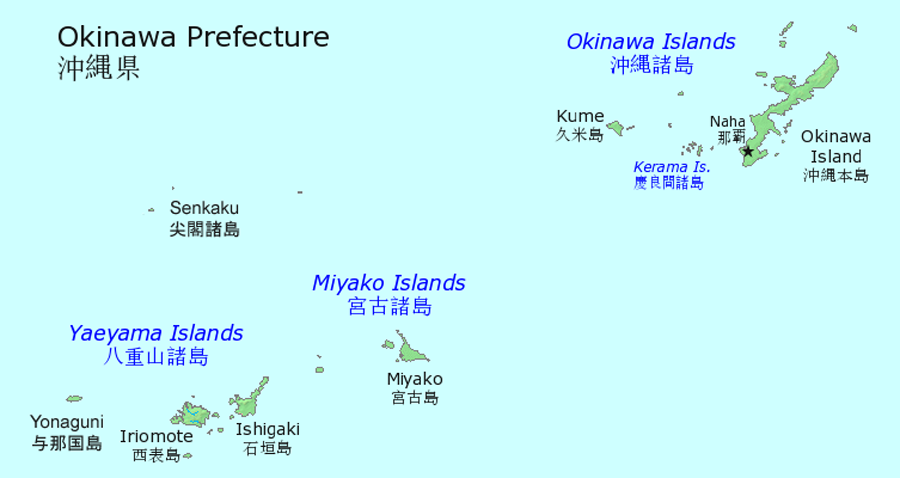

Geography
- Location: Pacific Ocean
- Coordinates: 26°10′04″N 127°17′31″E
- Archipelago: Kerama Islands

Administration
- Japan
- Prefecture: Okinawa Prefecture

Fukaji Island (外地島, Fukaji-jima) is an uninhabited island in the Pacific Ocean. It is part of the Kerama Islands group in Shimajiri District, Okinawa Prefecture, Japan.

The Kerama Airport is located on Fukaji. There is an observatory for whale watching near the entrance of the airport.
