= Zamami Island =

Island within Ryukyu Islands

Native name: Jamami
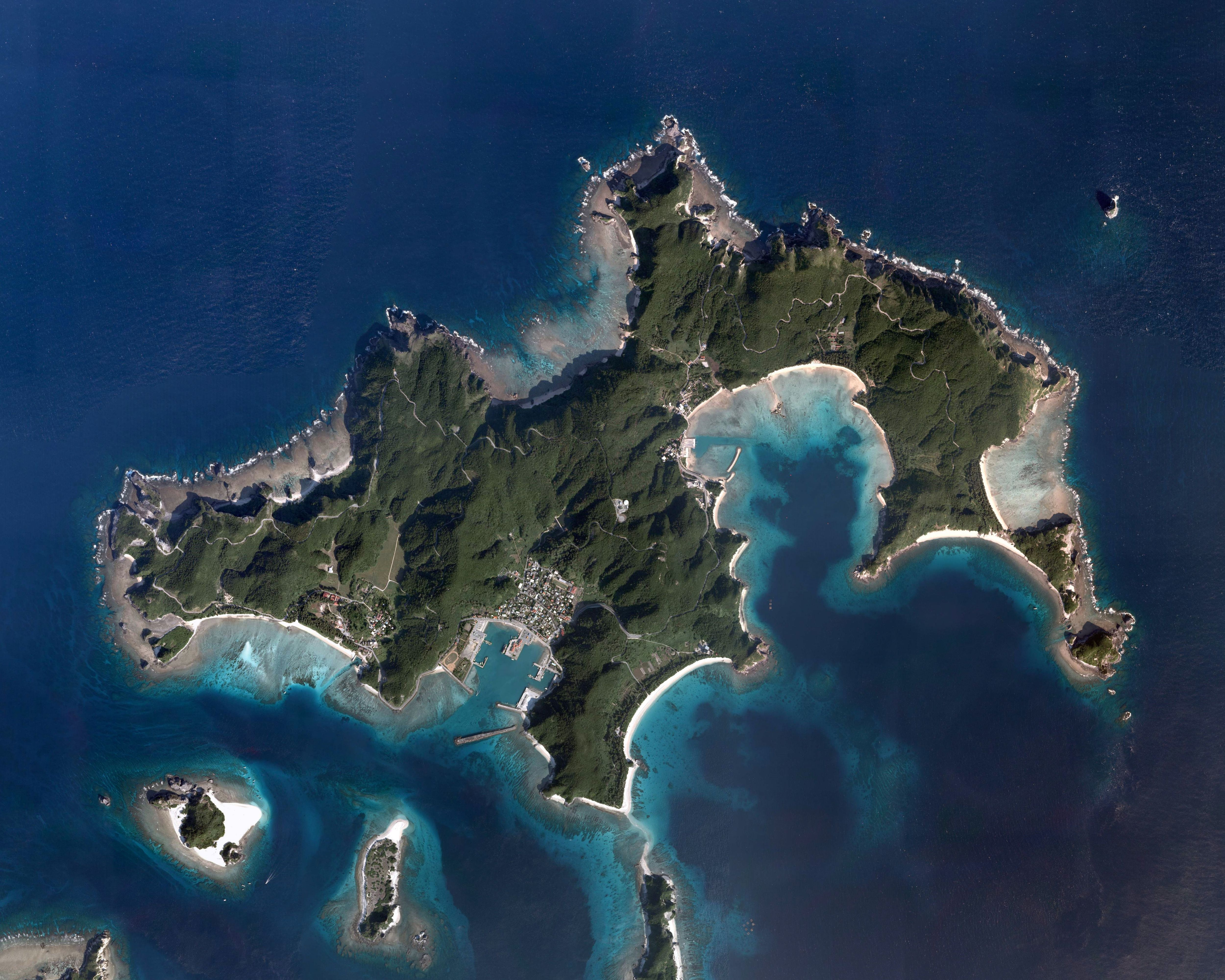
- Aerial view of Zamami Island

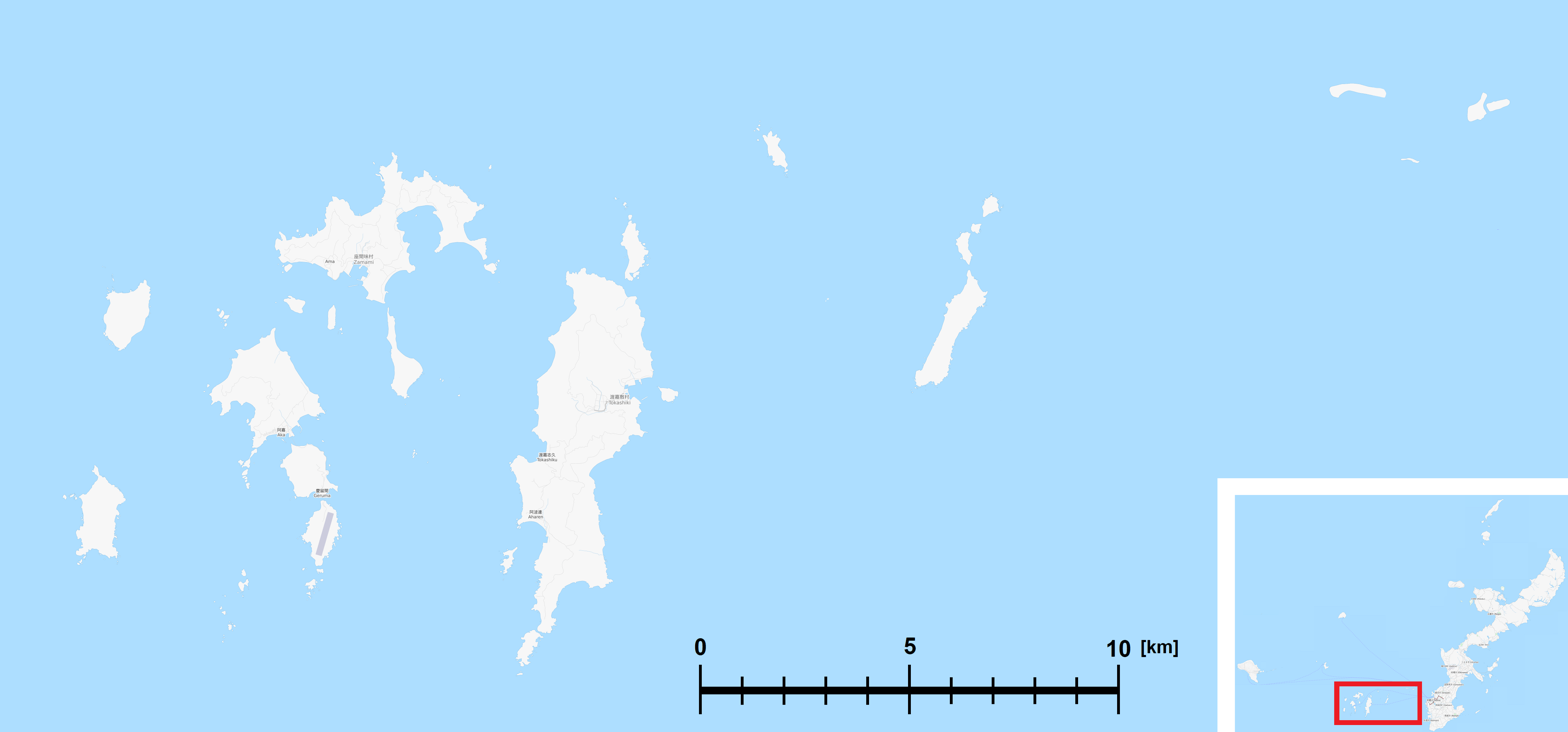
- Zamami Island in the Kerama Islands

Geography
- Location: Pacific Ocean
- Coordinates: 26°13′45″N 127°18′12″E
- Archipelago: Kerama Islands

Administration
- Japan
- Prefecture: Okinawa Prefecture

Demographics
- Ethnic groups: Ryukyuan, Japanese

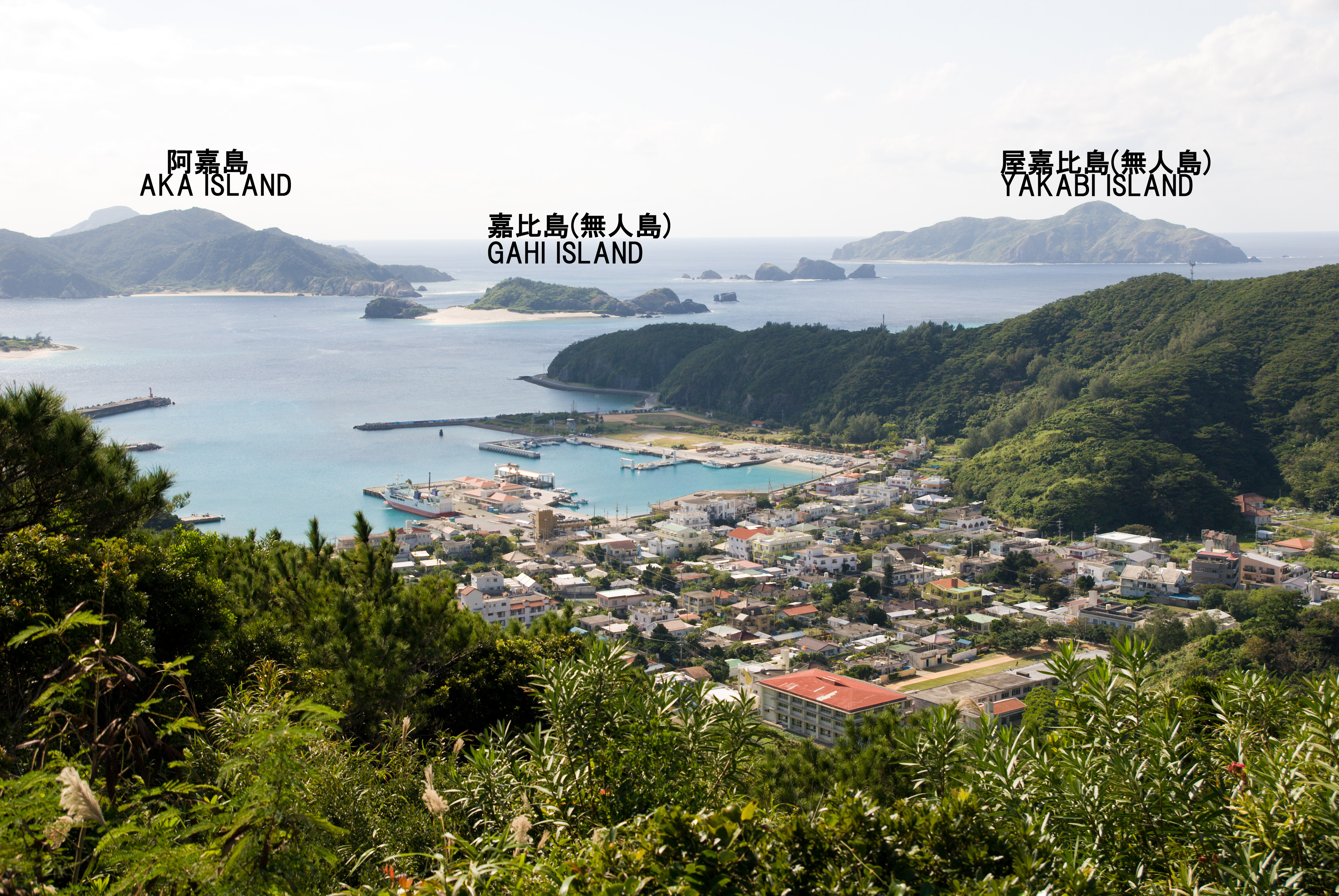
View from Mt. Takatsuki (overlooking Zamami Port and village)

Zamami Island (座間味島, Okinawan:Jamami ) is an island in the Pacific Ocean. It is part of the Kerama Islands group and administered as the village of Zamami in Shimajiri District, Okinawa Prefecture, Japan. Zamami Island is 24 kilometers in circumference. The island has 3 settlements, which are Zamami, Ama, and Asa.

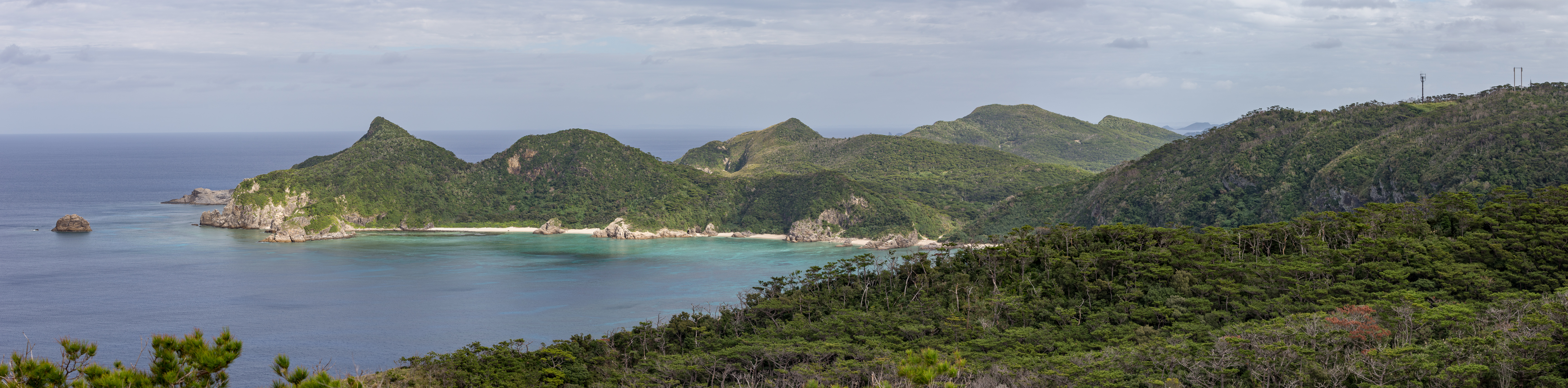
Zamami Island as seen from Inazaki Observatory, 2016

== Attractions ==
- Furuzamami Beach. It was ranked 4th in Japan in the “Travelers Choice World's Best Beach 2016” announced by Trip Advisor in 2016.
- Ama Beach
- Tower of Peace
- Statue of Marilyn (the dog portrayed in the 1988 movie I Want to Meet Marilyn)
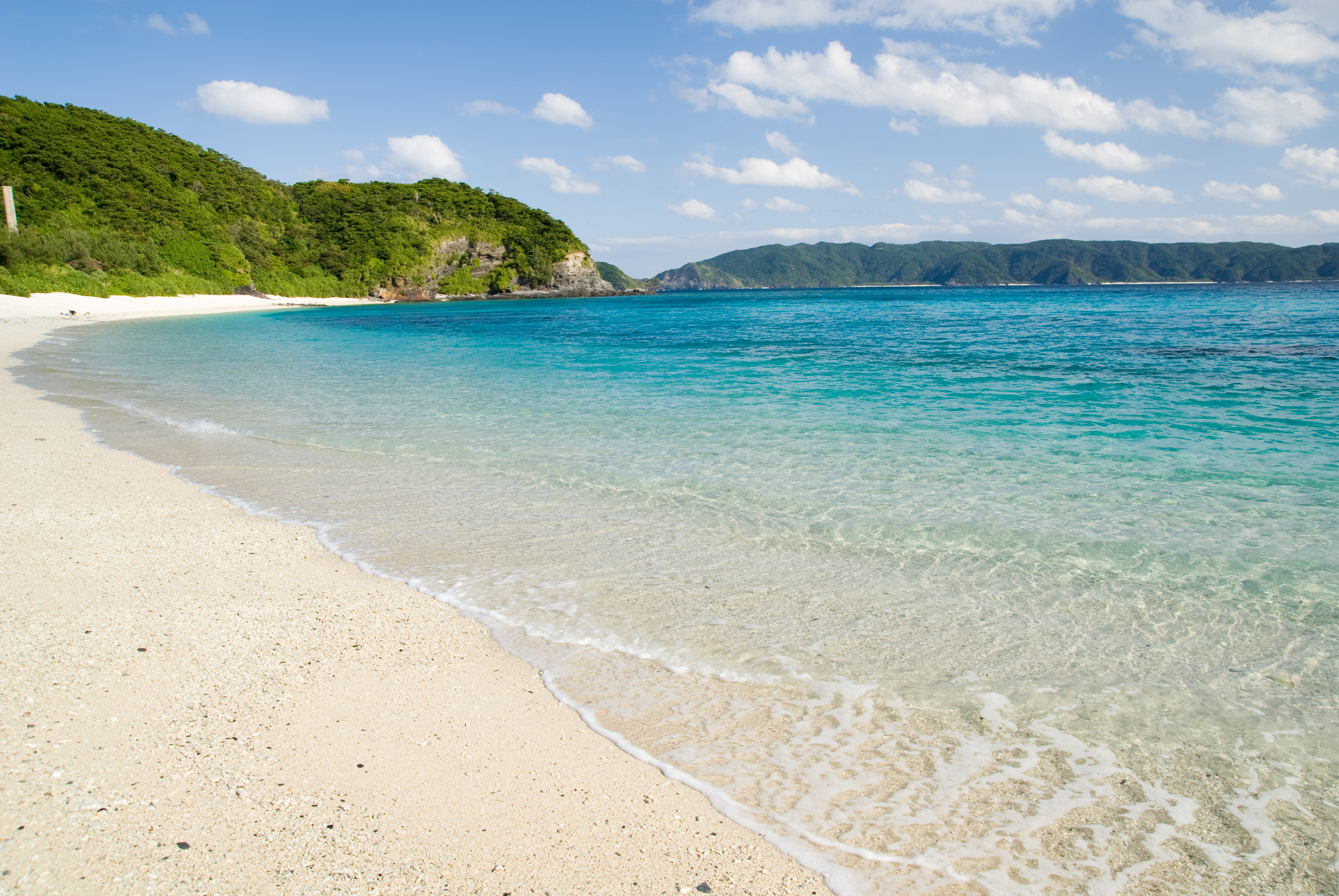
Furuzamami beach

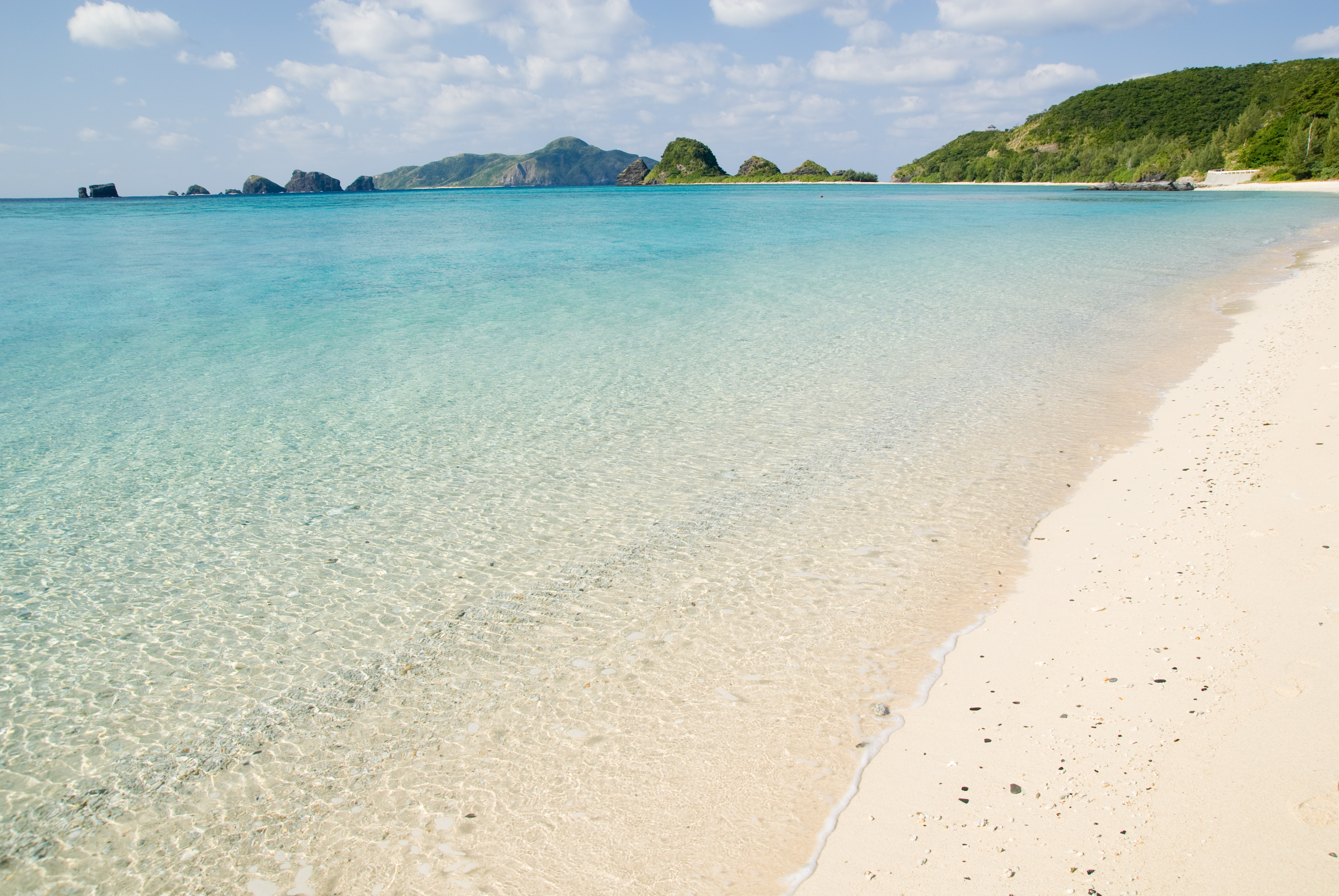
Ama beach

=== Lookout platforms ===
- Takatsuki mountain park
  - Takatsukiyama Observatory-Altitude 131m
  - Observatory 1-Overlooking the calm Ago-no-ura Bay
- Unaji-no-Sachi Observatory
- Inazaki Observatory
- Chishi Observatory
- Kami-no-Hama Observatory
