= 2019 Okinawa 3rd district by-election =

Local election in Japan

- 21 April 2019

Okinawa 3rd district
- Turnout: 43.99%
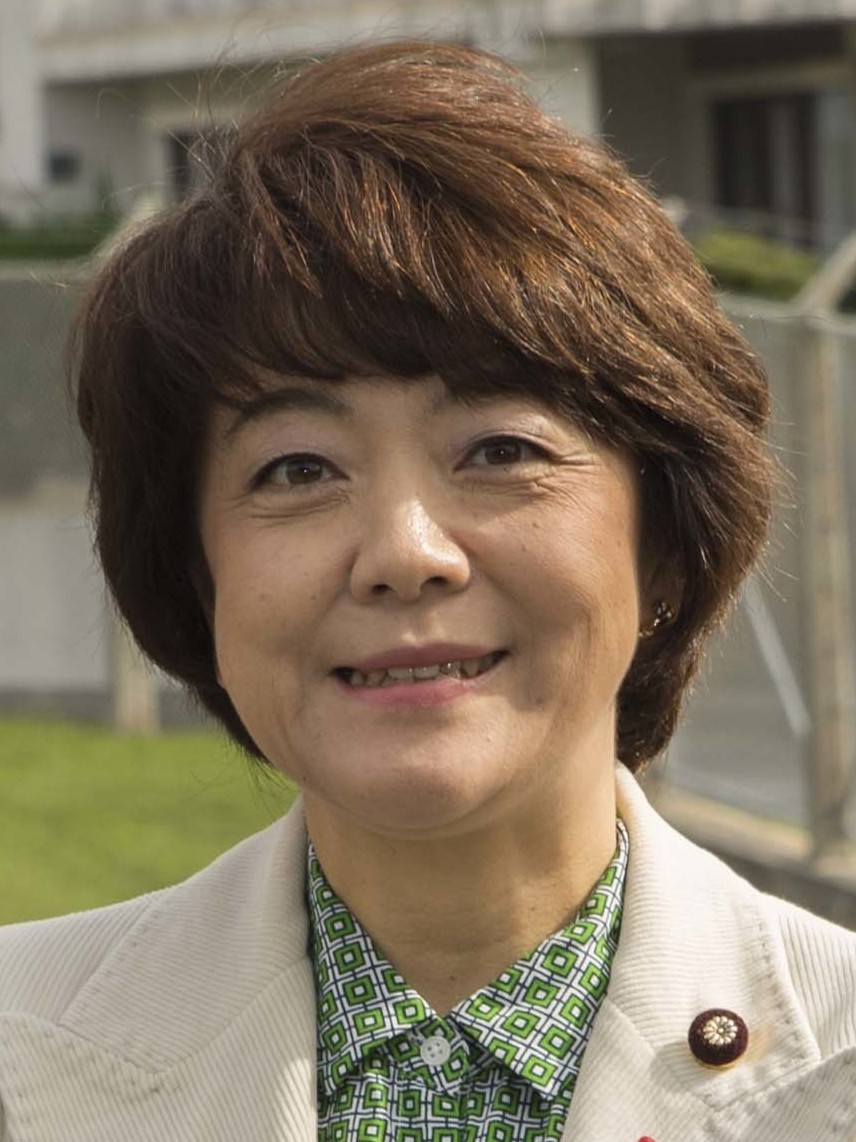
	Ind.
Candidate	Tomohiro Yara	Aiko Shimajiri
Party	Independent	LDP
Popular vote	77,156	59,428
Percentage	56.49%	43.51%
Representative before election
Denny Tamaki
Liberal
Elected Representative
Tomohiro Yara (Note: Yara joined the Liberal caucus soon after he was elected.)
Independent

A by-election for the Okinawa 3rd district in the Japanese House of Representatives was held on 21 April 2019.

== Background ==
The seat became vacant following the candidacy and election of its representative, Denny Tamaki to the governorship of Okinawa Prefecture. Tamaki was one of the two representatives from the Liberal Party in the House. He had served the district almost continuously since 2009 and defended the seat by a 17.56% margin in the 2017 election. The by-election was held on the same day with the second round of the unified local elections and another House by-election in the Osaka 12th district. The Okinawa-wide referendum in February influenced the by-election campaign.

The candidate supported by Tamaki and the All-Okinawa coalition, Tomohiro Yara won the by-election against LDP candidate and former minister Aiko Shimajiri.

== Candidates ==
1. Aiko Shimajiri (LDP), former member of the House of Councillors and cabinet minister.
2. Tomohiro Yara (LP), freelance journalist (endorsed by the All-Okinawa coalition).

== Results ==
House of Representatives: 2019 Okinawa 3rd district by-election
Party	Candidate	Votes	%	±%
Independent	Tomohiro Yara	77,156	56.5	
LDP	Aiko Shimajiri	59,428	43.5	
Total votes		136,584		
Turnout			43.99	−10.06
Independent gain from Liberal		Swing		
