= Genta Koja =

Japanese politician

- 古謝 玄太
- Koja in 2026

Governor of Okinawa Prefecture
- Incumbent
- Assumed office 30 September 2026
- Monarch: Naruhito
- Preceded by: Denny Tamaki

Deputy Mayor of Naha
- In office 21 December 2022 – 6 February 2026
- Mayor: Satoru Chinen
- Preceded by: Kengo Kuba
- Succeeded by: Kōya Kinjo

Vice President of the Okinawa Pharmaceutical Association
- In office 18 June 2023 – 30 September 2026
- President: Tomoko Maehama

Personal details
- Born: 23 October 1983 (age 43) Naha, Okinawa, Japan
- Party: Independent
- Other political affiliations: LDP (until 2022)
- Education: University of Tokyo
- Website: Official website

Genta Koja (Japanese: 古謝 玄太, Hepburn: Koja Genta; born 23 October 1983) is a Japanese politician serving as the 9th governor of Okinawa Prefecture. (Note: Depending on the method of counting, the numbering of Okinawa's governors varies. If counted by individual officeholders—excluding consecutive terms—Genta Koja is the 9th individual to serve as governor since the 1972 reversion of Okinawa to Japan. However, since several governors have served multiple terms, Koja’s administration constitutes the 15th gubernatorial term since the reversion.) Elected at age 42, he is the youngest governor in the prefecture's history and the first governor born after the U.S. occupation of the Ryukyu Islands.

== Early life and education ==
Koja was born on 23 October 1983 in Naha, Okinawa. His mother is from Hiroshima Prefecture, and his father is a physician originally from Miyakojima. His paternal family operates the Koja Soba noodle restaurant in Miyakojima. He attended the Junior and Senior High School Affiliated to Showa Pharmaceutical University, where he played competitive baseball during his junior high and high school years.

After graduating from secondary school, he was admitted to the University of Tokyo in April 2002, matriculating into Natural Sciences Category II. He graduated from the Faculty of Pharmaceutical Sciences in March 2006; he subsequently entered the graduate school but later dropped out.

== Public service ==
In April 2008, he joined the Ministry of Internal Affairs and Communications (MIC) and was assigned to the Municipal Division of Okayama Prefecture until 2009. From 2010 to 2012, he worked in the MIC Promotion of Content Distribution Division, later joining the Cabinet Secretariat in April 2013. He was seconded to the Nagasaki Prefectural Government from 2014 to 2018 and was appointed as an assistant to the counselor of the Reconstruction Agency in April 2019. He resigned from the Ministry of Internal Affairs and Communications in 2020.

Following his resignation, he joined the NTT Data Institute of Management Consulting, Inc. in April 2020. As a manager, he directed projects and contributed research concerning regional development, such as urban–rural linkages, resource mobilization, and regional revitalization. He also researched the development of public–private partnerships and the deployment of digital platforms to encourage regional community engagement.

== Political career ==
In the lead-up to the 2022 House of Councillors election, Kosaburo Nishime, a member of the Liberal Democratic Party (LDP) in the House of Representatives, approached Koja about running as an LDP candidate in the Okinawa at-large district. Koja accepted the request and announced his candidacy on 6 March 2022. On 10 July 2022, the election was held, and he finished in second place, losing by a slim margin of 2,888 votes to the independent, opposition-backed incumbent, Yōichi Iha.

On 21 December 2022, he took office as Deputy Mayor of Naha City under Mayor Satoru Chinen.

== Governor of Okinawa Prefecture ==
=== 2026 Okinawa gubernatorial election ===
On 1 December 2025, a preselection panel affiliated with the LDP—chaired by businessman Katsuya Kinjo and attended by mayors Satoru Chinen of Naha City and Masato Nakamura of Uruma City, as well as business and associational representatives—formed a committee to shortlist a candidate for the upcoming gubernatorial election. On 11 January 2026, the committee nominated Koja as its gubernatorial contender against incumbent left-wing candidate Denny Tamaki. He resigned as Deputy Mayor of Naha City on 6 February and officially accepted his candidacy on 23 March.

On 27 August, Koja's campaign officially commenced. Shortly before the announcement on 25 August, conservative candidate Mikio Shimoji withdrew from the race via a post on X, leaving Koja and Tamaki as the two main contenders in the election.

On 13 September, Koja won 59.42% of the popular vote, defeating Tamaki by a margin of 21 percentage points. Winning a majority in 40 of Okinawa's 41 municipalities, he secured the second-highest vote share, behind only the 64.38% record set by Keiichi Inamine. Koja's 423,124 votes surpassed Tamaki's 2018 record for the highest vote total.

On 17 September, Koja received an email threat demanding that he reject the governorship and call a new election, failing which the schools attended by his children, as well as the Okinawa Prefecture Government Building, would be bombed. In response, Koja issued a statement on 19 September, indicating that an investigation was ongoing.

=== First term (2026–present) ===
On 30 September 2026, Koja arrived at the Okinawa Prefecture Government Building, completed the official handover and assumed office as the 9th governor of Okinawa. At age 42, he became the youngest person to serve as governor of Okinawa and the first governor born after the 1972 reversion of Okinawa to Japan.

== Personal life ==
Koja and his wife, a Tottori native, have one son and four daughters. Following the birth of his fifth child, a daughter, in July 2023, Koja took a one-month paternity leave.

== Notes ==
Political offices
Preceded by Denny Tamaki (interim)	Governor of Okinawa Prefecture; 2026–present	Incumbent
