= 2022 Okinawa gubernatorial election =

- 11 September 2022
- Turnout: 57.92% ▼5.32%
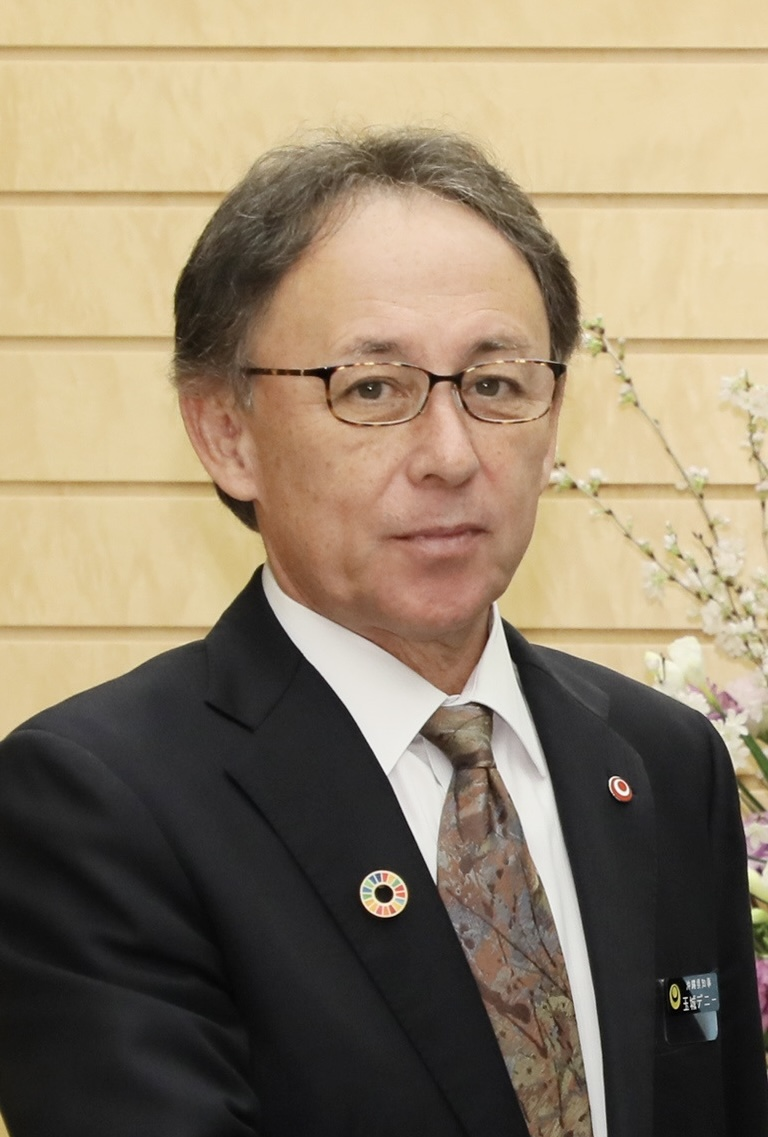

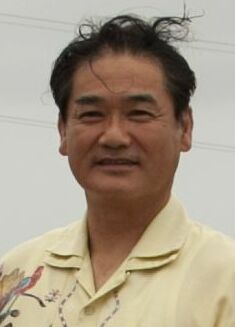

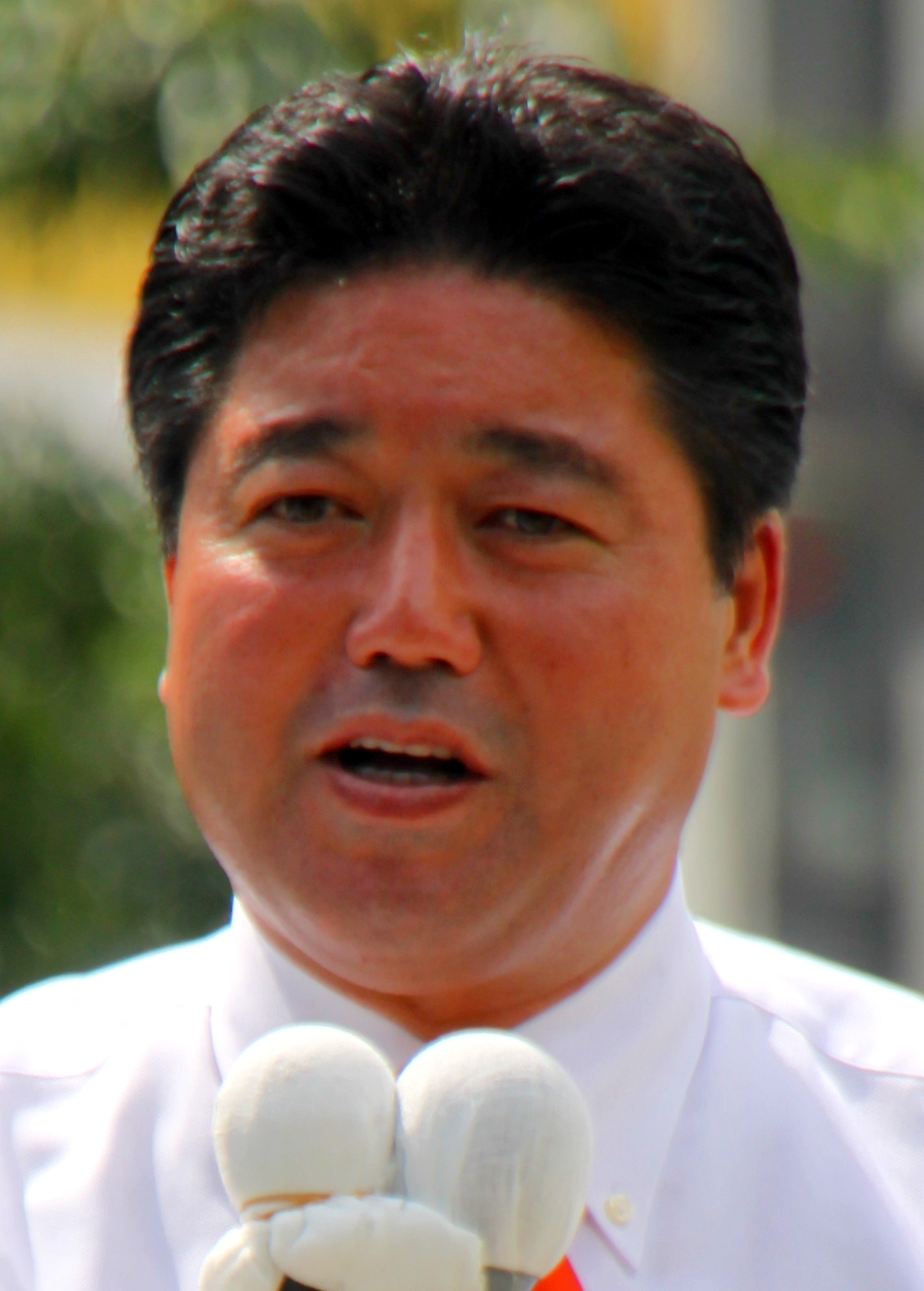
Candidate	Denny Tamaki	Atsushi Sakima	Mikio Shimoji
Party	Independent	Independent	Independent
Popular vote	339,767	274,844	53,677
Percentage	50.84%	41.13%	8.03%
Governor before election
Denny Tamaki
Independent
Elected Governor
Denny Tamaki
Independent

The 2022 Okinawa gubernatorial election was held on 11 September 2022 to elect the next governor of Okinawa. In the election, incumbent Governor Denny Tamaki who was backed by the Constitutional Democratic Party of Japan and some smaller parties ran against Atsushi Sakima who was supported by the Liberal Democratic Party and Komeito. Mikio Shimoji ran against both candidates as a third option. The potential relocation of the Naval Base Okinawa was, again, an important topic in the debate. Over 70% of voters in Okinawa opposed the relocation in the 2019 Okinawan referendum. Tamaki supported the complete removal of the base, while Sakima supported relocating it. Denny Tamaki won with 51.7% of the vote against Sakima and Mikio Shimoji.

== Candidates ==
=== Running ===
- Denny Tamaki, incumbent Governor of Okinawa (2018–). (nominated by CDP, JCP, Reiwa Shinsengumi, SDP, and OSMP)
- Atsushi Sakima, mayor of Ginowan (2012–2018) and candidate for Governor in the 2018 Okinawa gubernatorial election. (nominated by LDP and Komeito)
- Mikio Shimoji, former Minister of State for Disaster Management (2012) and Member of the House of Representatives (2014–)

== Results ==
Okinawa gubernatorial election, 2022
Party	Candidate	Votes	%	±%
Independent	Denny Tamaki	339,767	50.8	
Independent	Atsushi Sakima	274,844	41.1	
Independent	Mikio Shimoji	53,677	8.0	
Total valid votes		668,288	100.00	
Turnout		766,767	57.92	▼5.32
Registered electors		1,323,838		
