= 2019 Okinawan referendum =

- 24 February 2019
- On the central government's plan to conduct landfill work at Henoko, Nago for the planned relocation of Marine Corps Air Station Futenma

Results
Support	19.10%
Oppose	72.15%
No opinion either way	8.75%

A referendum was held in Okinawa Prefecture on 24 February 2019. The referendum asked whether voters approved or opposed the landfill work at Henoko Bay for the construction of a new United States Marine Corps base. This is the second prefecture-wide referendum in Okinawa, the first being the 1996 referendum on the reduction of US military presence. Governor Denny Tamaki announced the referendum in November 2018, fulfilling his manifesto promise from his successful campaign for governor.

The Okinawan electorate voted to overwhelmingly reject the central government's Henoko move plan. 72% of Okinawan voters opposed the plan, with 19% supporting the plan. The Oppose vote also passed the 25% electorate threshold, which means the governor is obliged to respect the result and to convey it to the Prime Minister of Japan and the President of the United States. However, the central government is not legally obliged to respect the result.

== Referendum question and options ==
The ballot asked voters to decide:

On the central government's plan to conduct landfill work at Henoko, Nago for the planned relocation of Marine Corps Air Station Futenma

Voters had three options: Support, Oppose and "No opinion either way". It was initially proposed that the referendum had two straight options: Support or Oppose. 5 conservative-aligned mayors of Okinawa City, Uruma, Ginowan, Miyakojima and Ishigaki protested at this plan and threatened to exclude their cities from the referendum. A compromise was reached in January to include the third "No opinion either way" option. The dispute caused a delay on the preparations for the vote in the 5 municipalities. Although a separate voting date for those municipalities was expected initially, the referendum preparations there were finished on time and they will hold the referendum on the same day as the rest of the prefecture.

Early voting was available from 15 to 23 February.

== Petition ==
On 8 December 2018, Okinawan-Hawaiian activist Robert Kajiwara created a petition titled, "Stop the landfill of Henoko/Oura Bay until a referendum can be held in Okinawa" on the White House's We the People petitioning portal. On 18 December, the petition got 100,343 signatures, reaching the necessary number of signatures for it to be reviewed and receive a response by the White House. The petition was drawn to attention by multiple individuals who signed it. People such as Brian May, Rola, Ryuichi Sakamoto, Daisuke Muramoto, Ryucheru, and others have openly expressed their support. The petition received over 200,000 signatures by the end of January. As of February 24 (date of referendum), the White House has not given a response.

Kajiwara was detained and interrogated by Japanese immigration officers when he came to Japan in February 2019 to campaign in the referendum.

== Endorsements ==
=== Support ===
==== Parties ====
- Liberal Democratic Party

==== Individuals ====
- Kosaburo Nishime, member of the House of Representatives for Okinawa 4th district.

=== Oppose ===
==== Parties ====
- Constitutional Democratic Party

==== Individuals ====
- Denny Tamaki, incumbent governor of Okinawa
- Ryuichi Sakamoto, composer
- Brian May, guitarist of Queen
- Rola, model and actress

== Opinion polling ==
Date(s) conducted	Polling organisation	Sample size	Support	Oppose	No opinion either way	Undecided	Lead
24 Feb 2019	Results	605,385	19.10%	72.15%	8.75%		53.05%
16–17 Feb 2019	Asahi Shimbun	1,125	16%	59%	21%	4%	38%
16–17 Feb 2019	Kyodo News		15.8%	67.6%	13.1%	0.5%	51.8%

== Results ==
Choice	Votes	%
Support	114,933	19.10%
Oppose	434,273	72.15%
No opinion either way	52,682	8.75%
Valid votes	601,888	99.42%
Invalid or blank votes	3,497	0.58%
Total votes	605,385	100%
Registered voters and turnout	1,153,591	52.48%
Source: Okinawa Prefectural Government Asahi Shimbun

=== Breakdown ===
Division	Subdivision												
Division	Subdivision	Support		Oppose		No opinion either way		Valid votes		Invalid votes		Turnout	
Division	Subdivision	Votes	%	Votes	%	Votes	%	Votes	%	Votes	%	Total	%
Cities	Naha	23,372	17.15	102,348	75.08	10,590	7.77	136,310	99.53	650	0.47	136,960	53.44
Cities	Ginowan	9,643	24.36	26,439	66.80	3,500	8.84	39,582	99.48	206	0.52	39,788	51.81
Cities	Ishigaki	3,566	20.99	12,165	71.60	1,259	7.41	16,990	99.14	148	0.86	17,138	44.63
Cities	Urasoe	9,801	20.21	34,498	71.14	4,192	8.64	48,491	99.58	203	0.42	48,694	54.79
Cities	Nago	4,455	18.00	18,077	73.04	2,216	8.95	24,748	99.46	135	0.54	24,883	50.47
Cities	Itoman	4,523	18.35	17,958	72.84	2,174	8.82	24,655	99.48	129	0.52	24,784	52.13
Cities	Okinawa	10,963	19.99	38,571	70.33	5,305	9.67	54,839	99.36	355	0.64	55,194	49.88
Cities	Tomigusuku	5,041	18.73	19,504	72.48	2,365	8.79	26,910	99.44	151	0.56	27,061	55.44
Cities	Uruma	9,757	20.17	33,891	70.05	4,734	9.78	48,382	99.29	347	0.71	48,729	50.28
Cities	Miyakojima	3,228	19.31	12,057	72.12	1,434	8.58	16,719	99.40	101	0.60	16,820	38.48
Cities	Nanjō	3,419	17.73	14,303	74.17	1,562	8.10	19,284	99.18	159	0.82	19,443	56.05
Cities	Cities total	87,768	19.21	329,811	72.18	39,331	8.61	456,910	99.44	2,584	0.56	459,494	51.51
Towns and villages	Kunigami District	5,552	20.33	19,155	70.13	2,607	9.54	27,314	99.25	206	0.75	27,520	52.66
Towns and villages	Kunigami	574	28.31	1,199	59.24	252	12.45	2,024	99.41	12	0.59	2,036	51.82
Towns and villages	Ōgimi	195	12.85	1,220	80.37	103	6.79	1,518	99.15	13	0.85	1,531	58.04
Towns and villages	Higashi	201	23.40	559	65.08	99	11.53	859	98.28	15	1.72	874	57.24
Towns and villages	Nakijin	646	14.53	3,430	77.69	339	7.68	4,415	99.24	34	0.76	4,449	58.12
Towns and villages	Motobu	1,045	19.76	3,707	70.09	537	10.15	5,289	98.99	54	1.01	5,343	49.33
Towns and villages	Onna	881	20.54	3,048	71.05	361	8.41	4,290	99.31	30	0.69	4,320	51.70
Towns and villages	Ginoza	488	17.92	1,921	70.55	314	11.53	2,723	99.09	25	0.91	2,748	59.64
Towns and villages	Kin	989	22.83	2,949	68.07	394	9.10	4,332	99.59	18	0.41	4,350	48.84
Towns and villages	Ie	534	28.65	1,122	60.19	208	11.16	1,864	99.73	5	0.27	1,869	49.07
Towns and villages	Nakagami District	12,613	18.36	49,914	72.65	6,175	8.99	68,702	99.43	391	0.57	69,093	56.43
Towns and villages	Yomitan	3,145	17.66	12,906	72.49	1,753	9.85	17,804	99.49	92	0.51	17,896	55.80
Towns and villages	Kadena	1,154	20.56	3,897	69.42	563	10.03	5,614	98.99	57	1.01	5,671	52.53
Towns and villages	Chatan	2,380	20.09	8,372	70.67	1,095	9.24	11,847	99.55	54	0.45	11,901	53.83
Towns and villages	Kitanakagusuku	1,423	18.48	5,629	73.10	648	8.42	7,700	99.30	54	0.70	7,754	57.58
Towns and villages	Nakagusuku	1,774	18.99	6,783	72.59	787	8.42	9,344	99.39	57	0.61	9,401	57.35
Towns and villages	Nishihara	2,737	16.70	12,327	75.20	1,329	8.11	16,393	99.53	77	0.47	16,470	59.67
Towns and villages	Shimajiri District	8,111	17.69	33,518	73.11	4,218	9.20	45,847	99.36	297	0.64	46,144	56.73
Towns and villages	Yonabaru	1,562	18.34	6,166	72.38	791	9.29	8,519	99.34	57	0.66	8,576	56.41
Towns and villages	Haebaru	2,843	16.39	12,960	74.69	1,548	8.92	17,351	99.42	101	0.58	17,452	58.87
Towns and villages	Tokashiki	101	26.44	193	48.25	52	13.61	382	99.48	2	0.52	384	66.78
Towns and villages	Zamami	103	18.49	381	68.40	73	13.11	557	98.41	9	1.59	566	72.66
Towns and villages	Aguni	58	19.80	198	67.58	37	12.63	293	97.99	6	2.01	299	50.76
Towns and villages	Tonaki	60	29.27	125	60.98	20	9.76	205	98.56	3	1.44	208	62.84
Towns and villages	Minamidaitō	136	28.81	274	58.05	62	13.14	472	98.54	7	1.46	479	49.23
Towns and villages	Kitadaitō	78	32.77	109	45.80	51	21.43	238	99.58	1	0.42	239	52.64
Towns and villages	Iheya	169	30.95	298	54.58	79	14.47	546	98.38	9	1.62	555	56.98
Towns and villages	Izena	205	34.86	307	52.21	76	12.93	588	99.16	5	0.84	593	51.34
Towns and villages	Kumejima	573	18.01	2,307	72.50	302	9.49	3,182	99.34	21	0.66	3,203	49.57
Towns and villages	Yaese	2,223	16.45	10,164	75.21	1,127	8.34	13,514	99.44	76	0.56	13,590	56.17
Towns and villages	Miyako District	133	31.52	254	60.19	35	8.29	422	100.00	0	0.00	422	50.36
Towns and villages	Tarama	133	31.52	254	60.19	35	8.29	422	100.00	0	0.00	422	50.36
Towns and villages	Yaeyama District	756	28.07	1,621	60.19	217	10.93	2,693	99.30	28	1.03	2,721	57.39
Towns and villages	Taketomi	520	26.20	1,248	62.87	99	13.98	1,985	98.06	14	0.70	1,999	59.02
Towns and villages	Yonaguni	236	33.33	373	52.68	316	11.73	708	98.97	14	1.94	722	53.32
Towns and villages	Towns and villages total	27,165	18.74	104,462	72.05	13,351	9.21	144,978	99.37	922	0.63	145,900	55.77
Total		114,933	19.10	396,632	72.15	52,682	8.75	720,210	99.42	3,506	0.58	605,394	52.48
Source: Results Turnout Election information website

== Aftermath ==
The day following the referendum, Prime Minister Shinzo Abe said that while the central government respected the result, construction works at Henoko would continue. This statement was reaffirmed by Chief Cabinet Secretary Yoshihide Suga and Minister of Defense Takeshi Iwaya. Construction works at Henoko also restarted straight away, causing indignation among the local populace who voted heavily to oppose it.
