= Tetsumi Takara =

Japanese politician

- 髙良 鉄美
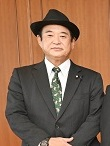
- Takara in 2022

Member of the House of Councillors
- Incumbent
- Assumed office 29 July 2019
- Preceded by: Keiko Itokazu
- Constituency: Okinawa at-large

Personal details
- Born: 15 January 1954 (age 72) Naha, Okinawa, USCAR
- Party: Okinawa Social Mass
- Education: Kyushu University

Tetsumi Takara (高良 鉄美, Takara Tetsumi; born January 15, 1954) is a Japanese politician currently serving as a member of the National Diet in the House of Councillors. He was elected on July 27, 2019, representing the Okinawa at-large district which encompasses the entirety of Okinawa Prefecture.

== Political career ==
Takara has expressed his disapproval towards the relocation of Marine Corps Air Station Futenma, saying “ I feel the weight of duty. I will bring attention to the issue of Henoko not being Okinawa’s problem, but a problem facing the whole of Japan“.

In the House of Councillors, he and fellow Okinawa representative Yōichi Iha form the Okinawa Whirlwind (沖縄の風) faction.
