= Takara (disambiguation) =

Takara was a Japanese toy and video game company that is now part of Takara Tomy.

Takara may refer to:

== People ==
- Takara (name), a Japanese surname and given name of other regions

== Other uses ==
- Takara (band), an American rock band
- Takara (whale), a killer whale living at SeaWorld San Antonio
- Takara, Central African Republic, a village in the Bamingui-Bangoran Prefecture
- Takara Holdings, a Japanese company that produces beverages, food, medical and computer supplies
