= Shiroma =

Shiroma (written: 白間 or 城間) is a Japanese surname. Notable people with the surname include:

- Mikiko Shiroma (城間 幹子, born 1951), Japanese politician
- Miru Shiroma (白間 美瑠, born 1997), Japanese singer
