= Protests against the US military presence in Okinawa =

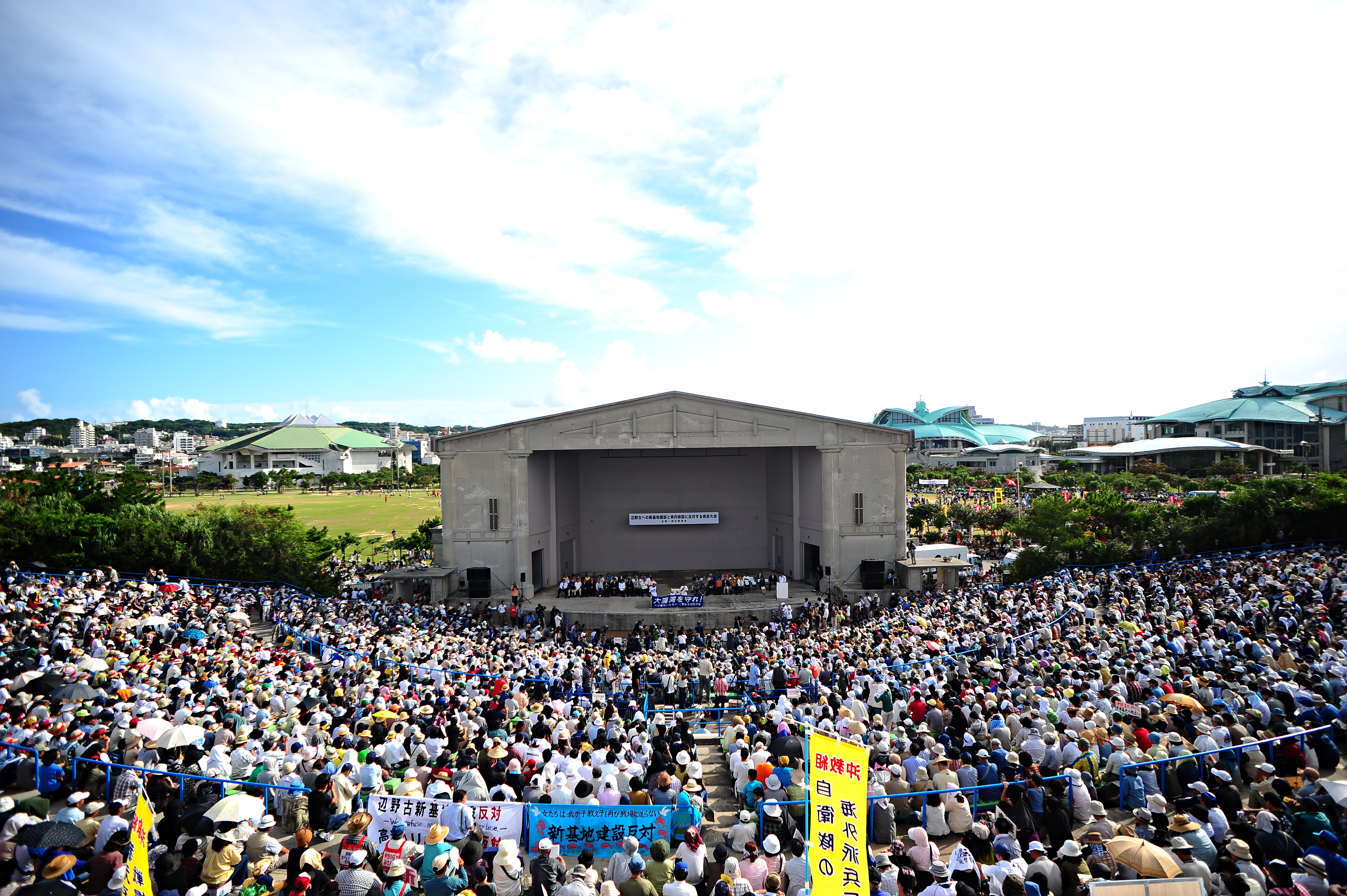
A crowd of Okinawans protesting the Futenma base in Ginowan, Okinawa

The main island of Okinawa accounts for 0.6% of Japan's land mass, though about 75% of United States forces in Japan are stationed in the Okinawa prefecture, encompassing about 18% of the main island of Okinawa. Following the ratification of the revised U.S.-Japan Security Treaty in 1960, massive protests of US military presence in Okinawa followed across Japan with an estimated 30 million Japanese citizens participating, known in Japan as the Anpo protest movement. With such a strong focus of United States Forces Japan in Okinawa, residents face economic problems of the highest unemployment in Japan as well as struggle for investment from outside businesses. Immense public opposition in Okinawa is still met with difficulty to create change for Okinawan citizens, while 25,000 American troops remain in Okinawa.

== Background ==
Okinawa was originally the heartland of the independent Ryukyu Kingdom with its capital at Shuri. While being a tributary state to China, Ryukyu found itself under a state of dual subordination after losing a war to Satsuma Domain of Japan. Satsuma directed Ryukyu to increase trade with China in order to circumnavigate the Tokugawa shogunate's policy of enforced isolationism. Following multiple visits to Ryukyu by Europeans and the Meiji Restoration, Japan increased control over Ryukyu until 1879 when, following several incidents of Ryukyuan resistance or refusals, the kingdom was forcefully annexed. Okinawa then became an official prefecture. This was followed by a period of cultural assimilation in order to make the Ryukyuans Japanese.

During World War II, Okinawa was the battlefield for an intense clash between American forces and the Imperial Japanese Army during the Battle of Okinawa. More than a quarter of the civilian population died, and the battle resulted in the American occupation of the Ryukyu Islands. While the Amami Islands were returned to Japanese control and military occupation ended in Japan in 1952, Okinawa remained under American control. Okinawa was returned to Japan in 1972, though U.S. forces retain bases on Okinawa to this day.

There has been continued civil unrest from Okinawans for the removal of the condensed military presence on the island. Accidents and crimes against Okinawans by Americans for years are the main factors for the Okinawan opposition. The U.S. has been continuously unwilling to remove troops from Okinawa because of its strategic location for surveillance and deployment for Pacific-Asian foreign affairs.

== Protests ==
In 1955, there was a rape and murder of a 6-year-old girl by an American soldier near the Kadena base which was then followed by another rape of a child by a soldier one week later. This led to the first Okinawan Citizens' Rally in protest of military occupation. Following this in 1956, the United States Civil Administration of the Ryukyu Islands (USCAR) recommended keeping U.S. forces in Okinawa, with no plans to leave in exchange for rental payments, and pursuit of acquiring more land for military use in a price report. In response to these actions, members of the Okinawan Parliament threatened to quit, and 16 political organizations combined to form the All-Okinawa Coalition for Land Protection. Upwards of 200,000 Okinawans participated in protests across the island.

Okinawans argued for land and private property rights, as farmers were limited by military presence. They also made antiwar arguments, arguing that they did not want their island used as an instrument to prepare for war and result in the death of more people. The U.S. argued that the military presence in Okinawa is helpful for economic stimulus to the citizens. During the Vietnam War Okinawans echoed even more antiwar sentiment and protested nuclear weapons being stationed in Okinawa.

In 1965, a six-ton trailer was parachute-dropped outside of the Yomitan Air Base and resulted in the death of a young girl. This incident was followed by a protest of 10,000 Okinawans calling to stop all military activities on the island. In June 2016, estimates of 65,000 Okinawans protested the rape and murder of a 20-year-old woman by a former U.S. Marine. Okinawa Governor Takeshi Onaga vouched for the removal of U.S. forces as a result of the incident.

=== Kadena Air Base ===
In June 1959, an F-100 fighter jet from Kadena Air Base crashed into an elementary school in Uruma, killing 17 and injuring 210. The residential area surrounding the Kadena Air Base has been subject to dangerously loud noise exposure from aircraft. During the Vietnam War, sound levels were dangerous enough to cause hearing loss for residents. Studies from noise recordings over the decades have allowed for the conclusion of risk of hearing loss among Okinawans in the area.

=== Koza riot ===
In December 1970, tensions in Koza, now Okinawa City, erupted in a clash between over 3,000 Okinawan citizens and U.S. military police. Clashes began when an American driver hit an Okinawan resulting in minor injuries. When military police arrived to see a crowd, warning shots were fired, which then caused the crowds to grow. The clashes led to a riot that lasted throughout the night, resulting in 82 vehicles being burned and 88 injuries. The spontaneous riot was thought to be a breaking point for Okinawans who were subject to poor treatment under U.S. military control.

=== 1995 rape incident ===
In September 1995, three U.S. servicemen from the Navy and Marines serving at Camp Hansen kidnapped, beat, and raped a 12-year-old Okinawan girl. The incident resulted in large protests in Okinawa calling for the men to be charged by Japanese authorities rather than American, where they were then charged and sentenced by the Naha District Court. Protests spread across the island, 80,000 Okinawans protested the rape at the Ginowan City Convention Center. Making international news, the incident shifted the dialogue to that of the damage caused by imperialism and calls for protection for women. This then lead to a debate of whether there should be a revision to U.S. military contracts in Okinawa. The rape incident was cause for the call for the relocation of the Futenma Air Station in Ginowan.

=== Murder of Rina Shimabukuro ===
On April 16th, 2016, Kenneth Shinzato (born Kenneth Franklin Gadson), a Marine veteran who had worked as a contractor at Kedena Air Base at the time, murdered and raped twenty year old Rina Shimabukuro. Several demonstrations would be held in response, with organizers estimating the amount of attendants at one rally to be 65,000. On December 1st, 2017, Shinzato was sentenced to life in prison without the possibility of parole.

=== Murder of Anna Yagi ===
According to the Japanese police, on October 3, 2026, Anna Yagi, a 39-year-old Japanese woman, was killed in a hotel in Naha, Okinawa Prefecture, by Jacob Ballard, a 20-year-old U.S. Marine corporal stationed at Marine Corps Air Station Futenma. Japanese prosecutors alleged that Ballard strangled her with a telephone cord and then stole her personal belongings. This incident has raised concerns among Okinawa residents about the large presence of US military forces on the island, and Japanese officials have called for full US cooperation with local investigations.

== Relocation of military bases ==
Following the rape incident, the U.S. was pushed to agree to close the Futenma Air Station and relocate it away from downtown Ginowan in response to large protests surrounding the issue. Futenma remained open for years while its relocation was debated and contested by Okinawans. In December 2013, Okinawa Governor Hirokazu Nakaima gave the go ahead for construction on the Henoko Bay base; this was responded with citizen disapproval and outrage.

On August 11, 2018, about 70,000 individuals gathered in Naha in opposition to the moving of the Futenma Air Station to the Henoko Bay, a less populated fishing village compared to Ginowan. The citizens of Okinawa wanted the base moved entirely off the island rather than to another area. Environmental groups oppose the relocation to the bay because of potential harm to coral and dugongs in the bay.

In February 2019, in a referendum for the citizens of Okinawa, over 70% of voters – about 434,000 people – voted against the construction of the new Henoko base. Following the results of the referendum, Prime Minister Shinzo Abe pushed for an understanding by Okinawan citizens for the relocation of the base. Some Okinawan voters claimed their voices were not heard in Tokyo as the central government still pushes for the move of the base to stay committed to the security alliance between the US and Japan.

In April 2012, Japan and the U.S. reached an agreement that 9,000 Marines stationed on Okinawa would soon leave. The Marines will be moved to Guam, Hawaii, or Australia to other military bases. The realignment is speculated to take place in 2024.
