= Soko Shimabuku =

Japanese politician (1926–2022)

- 島袋 宗康

Member of the House of Councillors
- In office 26 July 1992 – 25 July 2004
- Preceded by: Shinjun Ōshiro
- Succeeded by: Keiko Itokazu
- Constituency: Okinawa at-large

Personal details
- Born: 5 October 1926 Naha, Okinawa, Japan
- Died: 9 December 2022 (aged 96) Naha, Okinawa, Japan
- Party: Okinawa Social Mass
- Other political affiliations: Dainiin Club

Soko Shimabuku (Japanese: 島袋 宗康 Shimabuku Sōkō; 5 October 1926 – 9 December 2022) was a Japanese politician. A member of the Okinawa Social Mass Party, he served in the House of Councillors from 1992 to 2004.

Shimabuku died on 9 December 2022, at the age of 96.
