= Chiken Kakazu =

Japanese politician (1941–2024)

- 嘉数 知賢
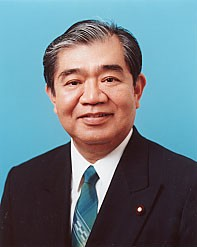
- Official portrait, 2002

Member of the House of Representatives
- In office 20 October 1996 – 21 July 2009
- Preceded by: Constituency established
- Succeeded by: Denny Tamaki
- Constituency: Kyushu PR (1996–2003); Okinawa 3rd (2003–2009)

Member of the Okinawa Prefectural Assembly
- In office 1980–1996
- Constituency: Nago City

Personal details
- Born: 1 June 1941 Nago, Okinawa, Japan
- Died: 15 October 2024 (aged 83) Nago, Okinawa, Japan
- Party: Liberal Democratic
- Education: Waseda University

Chiken Kakazu (Japanese: 嘉数 知賢, Hepburn: Kakazu Chiken; 1 June 1941 – 15 October 2024) was a Japanese politician of the Liberal Democratic Party, who served as a member of the House of Representatives in the Diet (national legislature). A native of Nago, Okinawa and graduate of Waseda University, he served in the assembly of Okinawa Prefecture for five terms beginning in 1980. He was elected to the House of Representatives for the first time in 1996. He lost his seat to Denny Tamaki in the 2009 general election. Kakazu died from bile duct cancer on 15 October 2024, at the age of 83.

== See also ==
- Masako Ganaha

== Sources ==
- "Seijika jōhō ~Kakazu Chiken~" 政治家情報 〜嘉数 知賢〜 [Politician information: Chiken Kakazu] (in Japanese). JANJAN. Archived from the original on 3 December 2007.
