= 2018 Okinawa gubernatorial election =

Japanese election

- 30 September 2018
- Turnout: 63.24% ▼0.89%
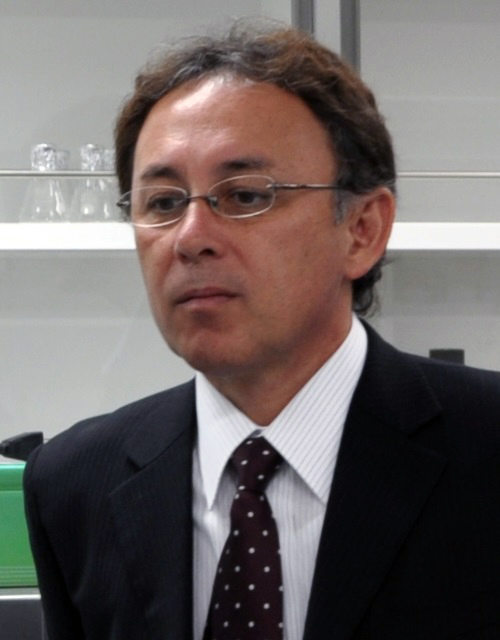

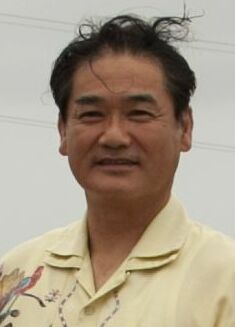
Nominee	Denny Tamaki	Atsushi Sakima
Party	Independent	Independent
Alliance	All Okinawa
Popular vote	396,632	316,458
Percentage	55.1%	43.9%
- Results by subdivision Tamaki: 40-50% 50-60% 60-70% Sakima: 50-60% 60-70% 70-80%
Governor before election
Takeshi Onaga
Independent
Elected Governor
Denny Tamaki
Independent

The 2018 Okinawa gubernatorial election was held on 30 September 2018 to elect the next governor of Okinawa. As there are no term limits in Japan, incumbent Governor Takeshi Onaga was eligible for re-election before his death in August 2018. The election was originally scheduled to be held on 9 December 2018, but this was brought forward after Onaga's untimely death. Onaga's deputy, Kiichiro Jahana temporarily assumed his post for three days until being replaced as interim governor by Moritake Tomikawa. This was the first gubernatorial election in Okinawa since the voting age was lowered to 18.

The relocation of the US air base in Ginowan to Nago was a major issue in the race. The campaign period ran from 13 September until election day.

The election was won by Denny Tamaki. Tamaki, like Onaga, wanted a fundamental reduction of the U.S. presence in Okinawa.

== Candidates ==
=== Running ===
- Atsushi Sakima, mayor of Ginowan (2012–2018). (endorsed by LDP, Komeito, Nippon Ishin no Kai, and Kibo)
- Denny Tamaki, member of the House of Representatives for the Okinawa 3rd district (2009–2018). (supported by CDP, DPFP, JCP, LP, SDP, and OSMP)
- Hatsumi Toguchi, former member of the Naha City Assembly.
- Shun Kaneshima, former IT company employee.

=== Speculative ===
- Takeshi Onaga, incumbent Governor, died in August 2018.

=== Declined ===
- Morimasa Goya, local businessman and Onaga ally.

== Campaign ==
Similar to the previous gubernatorial election, the issue of the relocation of the US air base in Ginowan to Nago dominated the campaign. The two main candidates were on opposing camps on the issue with Tamaki opposing any relocation within the prefecture and Sakima supporting the relocation. Tamaki made the relocation issue the main plank of his campaign. On the other hand, Sakima downplayed the relocation issue and instead focused on the local economy in his pitch. Voters that cited the base relocation as their most important issue mostly supported Tamaki, while those more concerned with the economy supported Sakima.

== Results ==
The exit poll on election night indicated a large victory for Tamaki and the NHK called the election for Tamaki early during the count. He gained 396,632 votes, the most ever obtained by a candidate in an Okinawa-wide election at the time, a record surpassed only by Genta Koja in 2026.

Okinawa gubernatorial election, 2018
Party	Candidate	Votes	%	±%
Independent	Denny Tamaki	396,632	55.07	
Independent	Atsushi Sakima	316,458	43.94	
Independent	Shun Kaneshima	3,638	0.51	
Independent	Hatsumi Toguchi	3,482	0.48	
Total valid votes		720,210	99.31	
Rejected ballots		5,044	0.69	
Turnout		725,254	63.24	▼0.89
Registered electors		1,146,815		

=== Breakdown ===
Division	Subdivision														
Division	Subdivision	Sakima Independent		Tamaki Independent		Toguchi Independent		Kaneshima Independent		Valid votes		Invalid votes		Turnout	
Division	Subdivision	Votes	%	Votes	%	Votes	%	Votes	%	Votes	%	Votes	%	Total	%
Cities	Naha	65,524	40.91	92,264	57.83	869	0.54	1,152	0.72	160,169	99.24	1,219	0.76	161,388	65.86
Cities	Ginowan	26,644	53.99	22,379	45.35	142	0.29	185	0.37	49,350	99.44	279	0.56	49,629	64.03
Cities	Ishigaki	11,648	50.89	11,015	48.12	97	0.42	129	0.56	22,889	99.12	204	0.88	23,093	55.25
Cities	Urasoe	25,319	44.80	30,622	54.18	264	0.47	312	0.55	56,517	99.34	376	0.66	56,893	65.60
Cities	Nago	15,013	46.86	16,796	52.43	136	0.42	93	0.29	32,038	99.58	135	0.42	32,173	68.30
Cities	Itoman	12,550	43.88	15,708	54.92	197	0.69	148	0.52	28,603	99.31	199	0.69	28,802	63.45
Cities	Okinawa	27,321	42.78	35,947	56.28	239	0.37	363	0.57	63,870	99.43	367	0.57	64,237	60.31
Cities	Tomigusuku	13,039	42.46	17,442	56.79	121	0.39	110	0.36	30,712	99.24	236	0.76	30,948	62.94
Cities	Uruma	26,407	42.54	35,011	56.39	352	0.57	312	0.50	62,082	98.98	642	1.02	62,724	60.36
Cities	Miyakojima	13,314	54.50	10,961	44.87	83	0.34	72	0.29	24,430	99.37	154	0.63	24,584	59.49
Cities	Nanjō	9,773	43.11	12,642	55.77	147	0.65	106	0.47	22,668	99.37	143	0.63	22,811	67.09
Cities	Cities total	246,552	44.56	301,147	54.42	2,647	0.48	2,982	0.54	553,328	99.29	3,954	0.71	557,282	63.53
Towns and villages	Kunigami District	15,069	44.66	18,354	54.40	181	0.54	136	0.40	33,740	99.45	187	0.55	33,927	66.02
Towns and villages	Kunigami	1,555	58.07	1,101	41.11	11	0.41	11	0.41	2,678	99.59	11	0.41	2,689	66.73
Towns and villages	Ōgimi	600	34.31	1,141	65.24	3	0.17	5	0.29	1,749	99.71	5	0.29	1,754	66.34
Towns and villages	Higashi	589	52.68	516	46.15	11	0.98	2	0.18	1,118	99.38	7	0.62	1,125	76.97
Towns and villages	Nakijin	1,817	35.43	3,261	63.59	31	0.60	19	0.37	5,128	99.34	34	0.66	5,162	67.37
Towns and villages	Motobu	3,095	45.70	3,621	53.46	34	0.50	23	0.34	6,773	99.40	41	0.60	6,814	63.94
Towns and villages	Onna	2,275	44.55	2,771	54.26	38	0.74	23	0.45	5,107	99.45	28	0.55	5,135	63.36
Towns and villages	Ginoza	1,389	44.15	1,716	54.55	21	0.67	20	0.64	3,146	99.24	24	0.76	3,170	72.94
Towns and villages	Kin	2,635	48.51	2,755	50.72	18	0.33	24	0.44	5,432	99.45	30	0.55	5,462	64.58
Towns and villages	Ie	1,114	42.70	1,472	56.42	14	0.54	9	0.34	2,609	99.73	7	0.27	2,616	65.11
Towns and villages	Nakagami District	30,632	39.85	45,597	59.32	355	0.46	279	0.36	76,863	99.39	470	0.61	77,333	65.37
Towns and villages	Yomitan	7,658	39.17	11,715	59.92	111	0.57	66	0.34	19,550	99.41	117	0.59	19,667	64.14
Towns and villages	Kadena	3,231	47.24	3,534	51.67	47	0.69	27	0.39	6,839	99.33	46	0.67	6,885	65.58
Towns and villages	Chatan	5,280	40.38	7,694	58.85	51	0.39	50	0.39	13,075	99.38	82	0.62	13,157	62.38
Towns and villages	Kitanakagusuku	3,169	36.94	5,344	62.30	32	0.37	33	0.38	8,578	99.54	40	0.46	8,618	66.41
Towns and villages	Nakagusuku	4,393	41.82	6,045	57.54	37	0.35	30	0.79	10,505	99.26	78	0.74	20,583	65.57
Towns and villages	Nishihara	6,901	37.68	11,265	61.50	77	0.42	73	0.40	18,316	99.42	107	0.58	18,423	68.48
Towns and villages	Shimajiri District	22,037	42.15	29,763	56.93	258	0.49	225	0.43	52,283	99.31	361	0.69	52,644	67.04
Towns and villages	Yonabaru	4,177	42.63	5,524	56.38	47	0.48	50	0.51	9,798	99.38	61	0.62	9,859	68.04
Towns and villages	Haebaru	7,435	38.63	11,669	60.63	75	0.39	67	0.35	19,246	99.42	113	0.58	19,359	66.78
Towns and villages	Tokashiki	207	51.75	193	48.25	0	0.00	0	0.00	400	97.80	9	2.20	409	75.84
Towns and villages	Zamami	261	44.54	319	54.44	5	0.85	1	0.17	586	99.49	3	0.51	589	81.17
Towns and villages	Aguni	189	52.21	169	46.69	4	1.10	0	0.00	362	99.45	2	0.55	364	63.51
Towns and villages	Tonaki	125	53.88	106	45.69	0	0.00	1	0.43	232	98.72	3	1.28	235	74.79
Towns and villages	Minamidaitō	513	68.31	231	30.76	5	0.67	2	0.27	751	99.60	3	0.40	754	77.08
Towns and villages	Kitadaitō	299	78.89	77	20.32	3	0.79	0	0.00	379	98.44	6	1.56	385	85.32
Towns and villages	Iheya	380	57.40	275	41.54	2	0.30	5	0.76	662	98.51	10	1.49	672	73.79
Towns and villages	Izena	437	59.05	291	39.32	9	1.22	3	0.41	740	97.88	16	2.12	756	69.76
Towns and villages	Kumejima	1,544	40.28	2,233	58.26	42	1.10	14	0.37	3,833	99.33	26	0.67	3,859	64.90
Towns and villages	Yaese	6,470	42.30	8,676	56.73	66	0.43	82	0.54	15,294	99.29	109	0.71	15,403	65.37
Towns and villages	Miyako District	421	68.68	191	31.16	1	0.16	0	0.00	613	99.51	3	0.49	616	73.89
Towns and villages	Tarama	421	68.68	191	31.16	1	0.16	0	0.00	613	99.51	3	0.49	616	73.89
Towns and villages	Yaeyama District	1,747	51.64	1,580	46.70	40	1.18	16	0.47	3,383	98.00	69	2.00	3,452	72.64
Towns and villages	Taketomi	1,148	48.58	1,178	49.85	25	1.06	12	0.51	2,363	97.40	63	2.60	2,426	71.70
Towns and villages	Yonaguni	599	58.73	402	39.41	15	1.47	4	0.39	1,020	99.42	6	0.58	1,026	75.23
Towns and villages	Towns and villages total	69,906	41.89	95,485	57.22	835	0.50	656	0.39	166,882	99.35	1,090	0.65	167,972	66.18
Total		316,458	43.94	396,632	55.07	3,482	0.48	3,638	0.51	720,210	99.30	5,044	0.70	725,254	63.24
Source: Results
