= 1996 Okinawan referendum =

8 September 1996
- Reviewing the U.S.–Japan Status of Forces Agreement and reducing the American military bases in Okinawa prefecture.

Results
Choice	Votes	%
Yes	482,538	91.26%
No	46,232	8.74%
Valid votes	528,770	97.62%
Invalid or blank votes	12,868	2.38%
Total votes	541,638	100.00%
Registered voters/turnout	909,832	59.53%

A referendum was held in Okinawa Prefecture on 8 September 1996 about the presence of United States Forces Japan bases in the prefecture. The referendum asked: "How do you feel about reviewing the Japan-United States Status of Forces Agreement and reducing the American bases in our prefecture?" The wording of the referendum was criticised for being unclear; a telephone survey conducted by the Ryūkyū Shimpō found that people were confused as to whether it called for the complete removal of US bases or just for a reduction in their number. With a turnout of 59.52% (9% lower than that seen in the recent assembly elections), 89% of voters, representing 53% of the electorate, agreed with reviewing the Japan-United States Status of Forces Agreement and reducing the American bases in the prefecture. Crimes committed by American soldiers stationed on the island, including the rape and beating of a 12 year old girl by three soldiers the previous year were seen as contributing to the strong opposition to the base. Support for the bases and thus for a "no" vote on the referendum came from a variety of sources; the local LDP, workers on US bases (at least 200 of which formed a breakaway union in protest of the main base worker union's support for the referendum), landowners of land owned by the US military, and local business owners who were reliant on income from American soldiers. Following the referendum the Governor of Okinawa Masahide Ota said that the results of the referendum should be clear to "those in the U.S. Congress who still feel like they own Okinawa." Despite the victory of those opposed to the bases in the referendum, Governor Ota allowed the expansion of the base to continue after the Supreme Court ruled the central government had authority.
