= Takara (name) =

Takara (宝 or 高良) is a Japanese surname. Notable people with the surname include:

== Real people ==
- Tetsumi Takara (高良 鉄美), Japanese politician
- Ryoko Takara (高良 亮子), Japanese football player
- Marcio Takara, Brazilian comic book artist
- Kathryn Waddell Takara (born 1943), American poet (surname acquired by marriage)

== Fictional characters ==
- Takara (佟寶駒), a character in the Taiwanese television series Port of Lies (八尺門的辯護人).

== Others ==
- Takara (whale), a killer whale living at SeaWorld San Antonio

== See also ==
- Japanese name
- Okinawan name
