= 2026 Okinawa gubernatorial election =

- 13 September 2026
- Turnout: 61.57% ▲3.65%

Candidate	Genta Koja	Denny Tamaki
Party	Independent	Independent
Popular vote	423,124	276,060
Percentage	59.42%	38.77%
Governor before election
Denny Tamaki
Independent
Elected Governor
Genta Koja
Independent

The 2026 Okinawa gubernatorial election was held on 13 September 2026 to elect the next governor of Okinawa.

Incumbent Governor Denny Tamaki ran for re-election, but he was defeated by Genta Koja.

== Candidates ==
A total of 6 candidates registered candidacies for the election.

Name	Age	Party	Title
Genta Koja （古謝玄太）	42	Independent (Note: endorsed by LDP, Ishin, Komei Okinawa, DPP, Sanseitō, CPJ.)	Former Deputy Mayor of Naha
Shun Kaneshima （兼島俊）	48	Independent	President of a tech company
Masahiro Sueyoshi （末吉正弘）	73	Independent	Healthcare Corporate Executive
Denny Tamaki （玉城デニー）	66	Independent (Note: endorsed by CDP, JCP, Okinawa Social Mass Party, Party of Life.)	Incumbent governor of Okinawa
Takashi Higa （比嘉隆）	49	Independent	President of a Civil Engineering Firm
Chōsuke Yara （屋良朝助）	74	Ryūkyū Independence Party	Leader of the Ryukyu Independence Party

== Party's endorsement ==
- LDP, Ishin, Komei Okinawa, DPP, Sanseitō, CPJ endorsed Koja.
- CDP, JCP, Okinawa Social Mass Party, Party of Life endorsed Tamaki.

== Results ==
Okinawa gubernatorial election, 2026
Party	Candidate	Votes	%	±%
Independent	Genta Koja	423,124	59.42	
Independent	Denny Tamaki	276,060	38.77	
Independent	Shun Kaneshima	4,657	0.65	
Independent	Takashi Higa	3,542	0.50	
Kariyushi Club	Chōsuke Yara	2,467	0.35	
Independent	Masahiro Sueyoshi	2,270	0.32	
Total valid votes		712,120	100.00	
Turnout		717,714	61.57	▲3.65
Registered electors		1,165,704		
