= Okinawa 3rd district =

Constituency for the Japanese House of Representatives

Okinawa 3rd District
- Parliamentary constituency for the Japanese House of Representatives
- Numbered map of Okinawa Prefecture single-member districts
- Prefecture: Okinawa
- Proportional District: Kyushu
- Electorate: 316,908 (2021)

Current constituency
- Created: 1994
- Seats: One
- Party: LDP
- Representative: Aiko Shimajiri
- Created from: Okinawa's at-large "medium-sized" district
- Municipalities: Nago, Okinawa City, Uruma, Kunigami District and parts of Shimajiri District (Iheya and Izena)

Okinawa 3rd district is a constituency of the House of Representatives in the Diet of Japan (national legislature). It is located in Okinawa Prefecture and encompasses the cities of Nago, Okinawa, Uruma, Kunigami District and parts of Shimajiri District (Iheya and Izena). As of 2016, 312,171 eligible voters were registered in the district.

In 2018 the district was represented by Denny Tamaki of the Liberal Party who automatically forfeited his seat after becoming a gubernatorial candidate in September. The by-election was not held in the immediate by-election slot in October 2018, but only in April 2019 because a Supreme Court decision on the constitutionality of the malapportionment in the last general election to the House of Representatives was still pending. The by-election date was later announced to be 21 April 2019. In the 2019 election, Tomohiro Yara, freelance journalist and strong opponent of the relocation of the Futenma US Marine base, defeated Aiko Shimajiri, former member of the Diet Upper House and minister. However, the 2021 general elections reversed the results. Reportedly, this was due to increased support for the LDP among younger voters because of the party's harder line on China and proactive security policy.

== List of representatives ==
Representative	Party	Dates	Notes
Kōsuke Uehara	SDP	1996 – 2000	
Mitsuko Tōmon	SDP	2000 – 2003	
Chiken Kakazu	LDP	2003 – 2009	
Denny Tamaki	DPJ	2009 – 2012	
Denny Tamaki	PLF	2012	
Denny Tamaki	TPJ	2012	
Natsumi Higa	LDP	2012 – 2014	
Denny Tamaki	LP	2014 – 2017	
Denny Tamaki	Ind.	2017 – 2018	Resigned to run in the 2018 Okinawa gubernatorial election
Vacant (September 2018 – April 2019)
Tomohiro Yara	Ind.	2019 – 2021	
Aiko Shimajiri	LDP	2021 –	

== Election results ==
2026
Party	Candidate	Votes	%	±%
LDP	Aiko Shimajiri	87,075	51.8	▲5.2
Centrist Reform	Tomohiro Yara	61,714	36.7	▼8.8
Sanseitō	Akiko Nakama	19,270	11.5	▲3.7
Registered electors		318,372		
Turnout			53.62	▲3.29
LDP hold				

2024
Party	Candidate	Votes	%	±%
LDP	Aiko Shimajiri (endorsed by Kōmeitō)	73,226	46.66	▼5.48
CDP	Tomohiro Yara (elected by PR)	71,457	45.54	▼2.32
Sanseitō	Tsukasa Shinjō	12,242	7.80	New
Turnout		156,925	50.33	▼3.67
LDP hold				

2021
Party	Candidate	Votes	%	±%
LDP	Aiko Shimajiri	87,710	52.14	▲8.63
CDP	Tomohiro Yara	80,496	47.86	▼8.63
Turnout			54.00	▲10.01
LDP gain from Independent				

2019 by-election
Party	Candidate	Votes	%	±%
Independent	Tomohiro Yara	77,156	56.49	▼1.37
LDP	Aiko Shimajiri	59,428	43.51	▲3.21
Turnout			43.99	▼10.06
Independent hold				

2017
Party	Candidate	Votes	%	±%
Independent	Denny Tamaki	95,517	57.86	▼2.12
LDP	Natsumi Higa (endorsed by Kōmeitō)	66,527	40.30	▲0.27
Happiness Realization	Tatsurō Kinjō	3,031	1.84	N/A
Majority		28,990	17.56	
Turnout			54.05	▲3.40
Independent hold		Swing	▼1.20	

2014
Party	Candidate	Votes	%	±%
People's Life	Denny Tamaki (endorsed by JCP, SDP, PLP, OSMP, the Greens and Shinfūkai)	89,110	59.97	▲23.91
LDP	Natsumi Higa (elected by PR, endorsed by Kōmeitō)	59,491	40.03	▼3.54
Majority		29,619	19.94	
Turnout			50.65	
People's Life gain from LDP		Swing	▲13.73	

2012
Party	Candidate	Votes	%	±%
LDP	Natsumi Higa (endorsed by NKP)	68,523	43.57	▲19.82
Tomorrow	Denny Tamaki (elected by PR, endorsed by NPD)	56,711	36.06	▼12.66
Restoration	Toshio Ōshiro (endorsed by YP)	12,503	7.95	N/A
JCP	Noboru Miyazato	10,269	6.53	N/A
Democratic	Hironobu Sakihama	7,404	4.71	N/A
Happiness Realization	Tatsurō Kinjō	1,874	1.19	▲0.31
Majority		11,812	7.51	
Turnout				
LDP gain from Tomorrow		Swing	▲16.24	

2009
Party	Candidate	Votes	%	±%
Democratic	Denny Tamaki (endorsed by PNP and OSMP)	89,266	48.72	▲24.76
LDP	Chiken Kakazu (endorsed by NKP)	43,513	23.75	▼18.76
Social Democratic	Shūsei Arakawa (endorsed by OSMP)	24,911	13.60	▼16.38
Independent	Tōru Odo	23,920	13.06	N/A
Happiness Realization	Tatsurō Kinjō	1,613	0.88	N/A
Majority		45,753	24.97	
Democratic gain from LDP		Swing	▲21.76	

2005
Party	Candidate	Votes	%	±%
LDP	Chiken Kakazu (endorsed by NKP)	72,407	42.51	
Social Democratic	Mitsuko Tōmon (endorsed by OSMP)	51,074	29.98	
Democratic	Denny Tamaki	40,819	23.96	
JCP	Ken Inohara	6,043	3.55	
LDP hold		Swing		

2003
Party	Candidate	Votes	%	±%
LDP	Chiken Kakazu (endorsed by NKP)	62,975	38.5	
Social Democratic	Mitsuko Tōmon (elected by PR, endorsed by DPJ and OSMP)	58,931	36.0	
Independent	Kōnosuke Kokuba (endorsed by NCP)	35,149	21.5	
JCP	Ken Inohara	6,581	4.0	
LDP gain from Social Democratic		Swing		

2000
Party	Candidate	Votes	%	±%
Social Democratic	Mitsuko Tōmon (endorsed by LL and OSMP)	68,378	33.8	
Independents' Club	Kenjirō Nishida	52,089	25.8	
LDP	Chiken Kakazu (elected by PR, endorsed by NKP and NCP)	48,622	24.1	
Democratic	Kōsuke Uehara	32,917	16.3	

1996
Party	Candidate	Votes	%	±%
Social Democratic	Kōsuke Uehara	80,534	47.0	
LDP	Chiken Kakazu	45,591	26.6	
Liberal League	Yoshimasa Takaesu	24,699	14.4	
JCP	Maneyoshi Furugen	20,532	12.0	
