= Keiko Itokazu =

Japanese politician

- 糸数 慶子
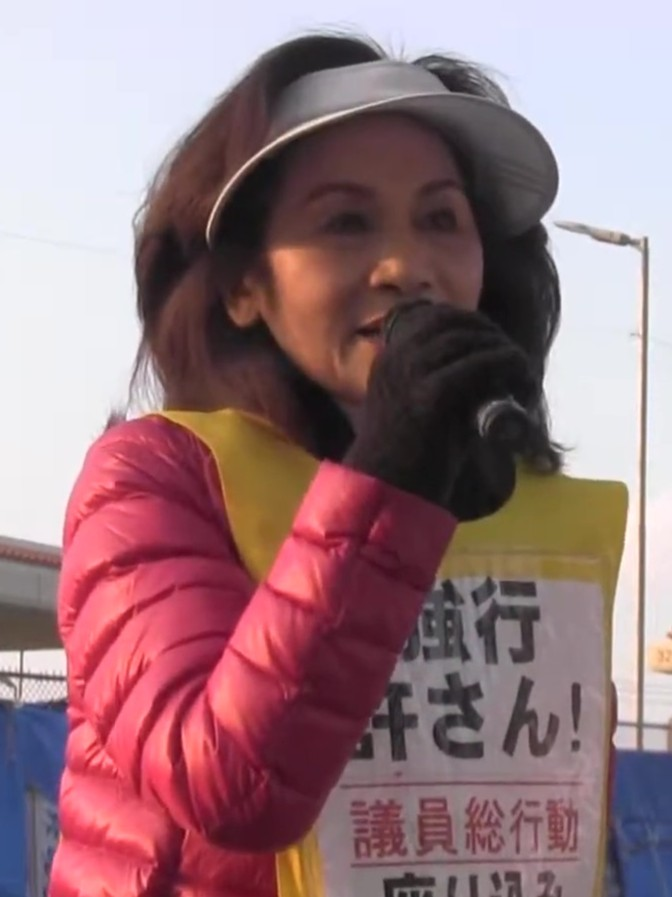

Member of the House of Councillors
- In office 29 July 2007 – 28 July 2019
- Preceded by: Junshirō Nishime
- Succeeded by: Tetsumi Takara
- Constituency: Okinawa at-large
- In office 26 July 2004 – 2 November 2006
- Preceded by: Soko Shimabuku
- Succeeded by: Aiko Shimajiri
- Constituency: Okinawa at-large

Member of the Okinawa Prefectural Assembly
- In office 1992–2004
- Constituency: Naha City

Personal details
- Born: 11 October 1947 (age 79) Yomitan, Okinawa, USMGR
- Party: Okinawa Social Mass
- Education: Yomitan High School

Keiko Itokazu (糸数 慶子, Itokazu Keiko; born October 11, 1947) is a Japanese politician, an independent and member of the House of Councillors in the Diet (national legislature). A native of Yomitan, Okinawa and high school graduate, she served in the assembly of Okinawa Prefecture for three terms, starting in 1992, and was elected to the House of Councillors for the first time in 2004. After running unsuccessfully for governorship of Okinawa Prefecture in 2006, she was re-elected to the House of Councillors in 2007.

Itokazu is a member of the Church of Jesus Christ of Latter-day Saints.

House of Councillors
Preceded by Kōsō Shimabuku	Councillor for Okinawa's At-large district 2004–2006; 2007–present	Succeeded by Aiko Shimajiri
Preceded by Junshirō Nishime	Councillor for Okinawa's At-large district 2004–2006; 2007–present	Incumbent
