= Denny Tamaki =

Governor of Okinawa Prefecture from 2018 to 2026

- 玉城 デニー
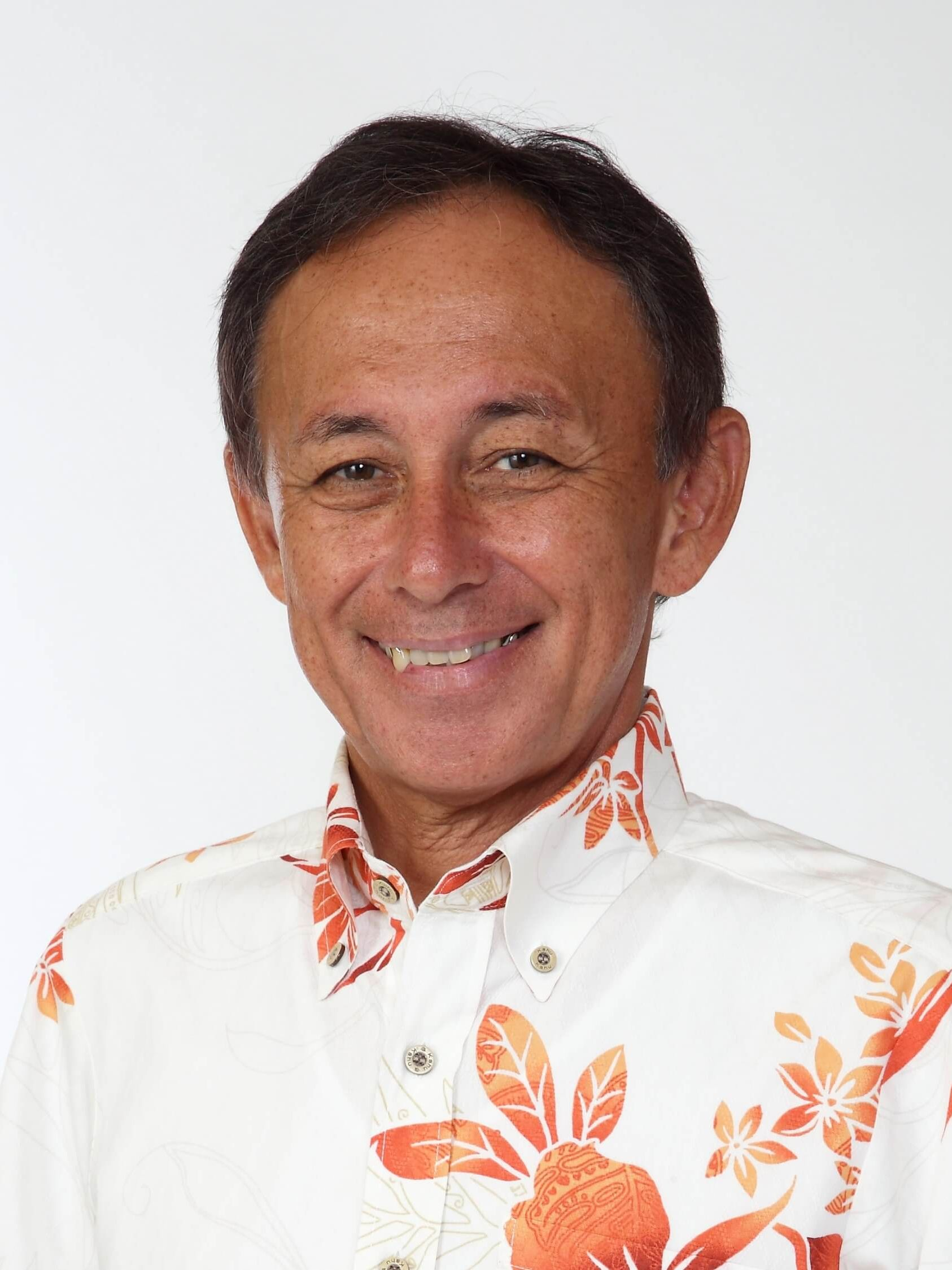
- Official portrait

Governor of Okinawa Prefecture
- In office 4 October 2018 – 29 September 2026
- Monarchs: Akihito; Naruhito
- Preceded by: Takeshi Onaga; Kiichiro Jahana (interim); Moritake Tomikawa (interim)
- Succeeded by: Genta Koja

Member of the House of Representatives
- In office 30 August 2009 – 13 September 2018
- Preceded by: Chiken Kakazu
- Succeeded by: Tomohiro Yara
- Constituency: Okinawa 3rd (2009–2012); Kyushu PR (2012–2014); Okinawa 3rd (2014–2018)

Member of the Okinawa Prefectural Assembly
- In office 28 September 2002 – August 2005
- Constituency: Okinawa City

Personal details
- Born: Dennis Tamaki; 13 October 1959 (age 67) Yonashiro, Okinawa, USCAR
- Party: Independent (2002–2005; 2018–present)
- Other political affiliations: DPJ (2005–2012); TPJ (2012); PLF (2012); PLP (2012–2018)
- Education: Sophia School of Social Welfare
- Website: Official website

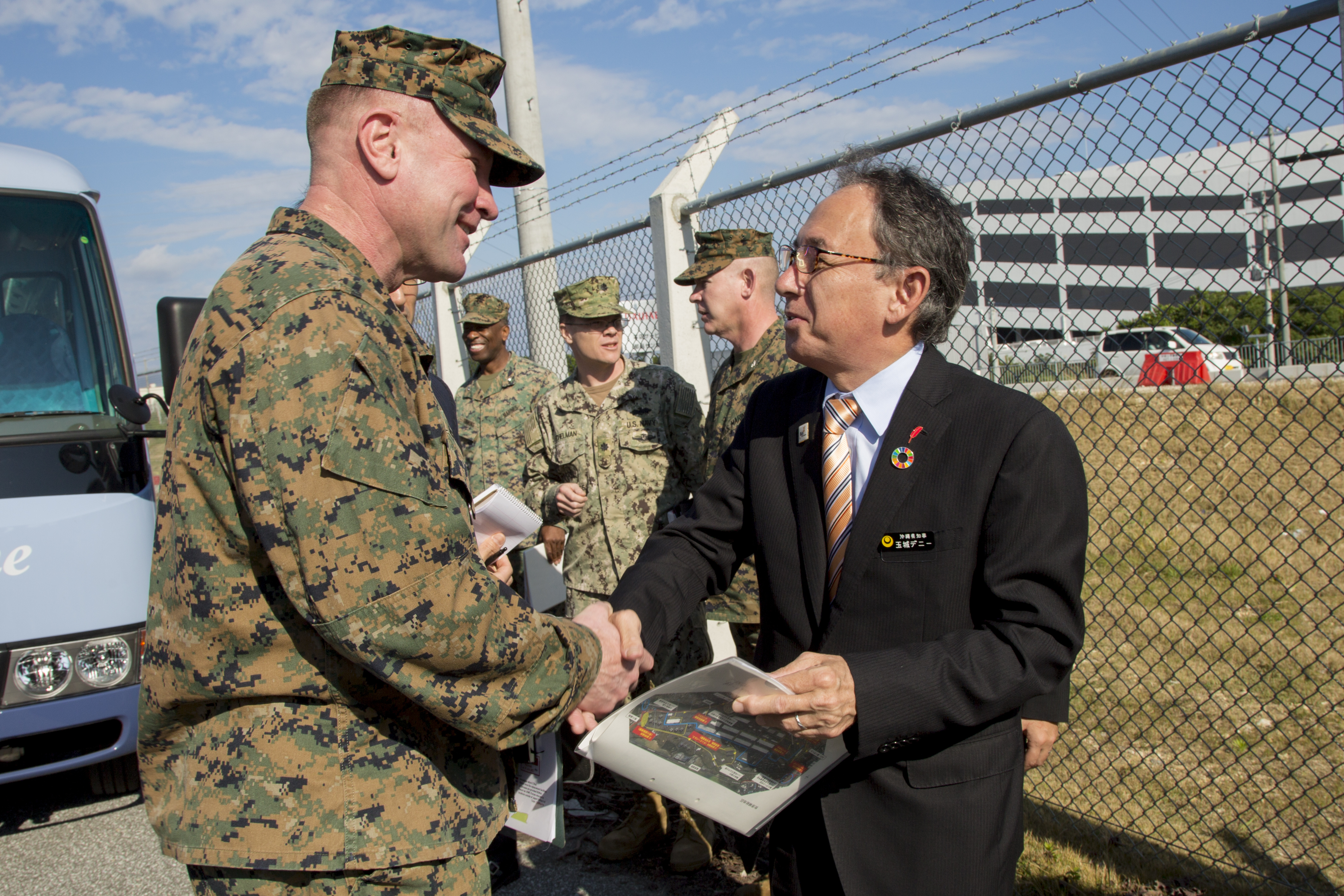
Tamaki (right) with US Marines stationed in Okinawa (2019)

Denny Tamaki (玉城 デニー, Tamaki Denī; born 13 October 1959) is a Japanese politician who served as the Governor of Okinawa Prefecture from 2018 to 2026. Tamaki was a member of the Okinawa Prefectural Assembly for Okinawa City from 2002 to 2005 and became the first Amerasian member of the Japanese House of Representatives as the representative for Okinawa Prefecture's 3rd district from 2009 to 2012 and 2014 to 2018. Tamaki was elected governor as an independent in the 2018 Okinawa gubernatorial election following the untimely death of Governor Takeshi Onaga. He was re-elected again in 2022. He was defeated for re-election in 2026.

== Early life ==
Dennis Tamaki (玉城 デニス, Tamaki Denisu) was born on 13 October 1959 in Yonashiro (now part of Uruma), Okinawa under American civil administration to an Okinawan mother and an American father who was a member of the U.S. Marine Corps and left Okinawa before he was born. Tamaki changed his legal name to Yasuhiro Tamaki (玉城 康裕, Tamaki Yasuhiro) at 10 years of age, with Denny (デニー, Denī) being a nickname kept since childhood. Tamaki has never met his father, and his mother remained single throughout his youth and destroyed most materials related to his father. Tamaki searched for his father, but was unsuccessful in locating him. Although Tamaki rarely discusses his American background, he describes himself as embodying Okinawa's predicament as a host for United States military personnel.

Tamaki left Okinawa to attend a trade school in Tokyo and returned afterward, working as a radio disc jockey for several years.

== Political career ==
Tamaki was an Okinawa City Council member from 2002 to 2005 until running in the 2005 general election for the Okinawa 3rd district in the House of Representatives, but lost to incumbent Chiken Kakazu. Tamaki ran again in the 2009 general election and defeated Kakazu for the 3rd district seat.

After his election to the Diet, Tamaki became a member of the Lower House Standing Committee on National Security and director of the Special Committee on Okinawa and Northern Territories Affairs. Tamaki joined Ichirō Ozawa in opposing the consumption tax hike proposed by Prime Minister Yoshihiko Noda in 2012, and was removed from the Democratic Party of Japan.

Tamaki lost the Okinawa 3rd district seat to Natsumi Higa in the 2012 general election, but retained a seat in the Kyushu proportional representation block with the Tomorrow Party, which collapsed and became the People's Life Party following the election. Tamaki recontested the seat in the 2014 election and regained the seat from Higa with a comfortable 20-point majority.

Shortly before his death in August 2018, Takeshi Onaga, the Governor of Okinawa Prefecture, named Tamaki and businessman Morimasa Goya as possible candidates to succeed him. Tamaki won the 2018 Okinawa gubernatorial election with 55% of the vote. Tamaki defeated Atsushi Sakima, a candidate supported by the Liberal Democratic Party. The election drew the attention of the national LDP, with national political figures such as Yoshihide Suga, Toshihiro Nikai and Shinjiro Koizumi traveling to Okinawa to campaign for Sakima.

On September 11, 2022, Tamaki was re-elected to serve another four-year term as governor, defeating Sakima a second time.

In 2026, Tamaki lost reelection as governor to Genta Koja.

== Positions ==
Tamaki has long been opposed to the U.S. military presence on Okinawa. In 2009, Tamaki called for a sharp reduction in American troop strength on Okinawa, stating that "it's about time the Japanese government let Okinawa go back to its original self" and "we need to wean our economy from its dependence on the bases." This position was the major focus of his 2018 gubernatorial campaign, in which he argued against the relocation of Marine Corps Air Station Futenma to another location on Okinawa, a position consistent with his late predecessor Onaga. The base relocation was the most important issue for voters in the 2018 election, according to an Asahi Shimbun exit poll. In June 2019, Tamaki stated that Chinese patrols near the disputed Senkaku islands (administered by Japan as part of Okinawa Prefecture) should not be bothered, which critics questioned if Tamaki thought they were not Japanese territory. Tamaki responded by taking back his statement and expressed that he was misunderstood.

Following a COVID-19 outbreak in the prefecture's US bases in 2020, Tamaki criticized the American military, expressing deep regret and doubt concerning the bases' ability to stop the spread of the virus, which at the time had already infected over 61 personnel. He cited possible sources of the outbreak, including off-base military parties on July 4, which had high risks of community spread.

== Personal life ==
Tamaki is married with two sons and two daughters. He is a singer and guitarist, and has written lyrics for Rinken Band.

Political offices
Preceded by Moritake Tomikawa (interim)	Governor of Okinawa Prefecture; 4 October 2018 – 30 September 2026	Succeeded by Genta Koja
