= Okinawa at-large district =

Japanese House of Councillors constituency

Coordinates: 26°30′N 128°0′E

Okayama at-large district
- 沖縄県選挙区
- Parliamentary constituency for the House of Councillors
- Prefecture: Okinawa
- Electorate: 1,178,239 (as of September 2022)

Current constituency
- Created: 1970
- Seats: 2
- Councillors: Class of 2019: Tetsumi Takara (OSMP); Class of 2022: Yōichi Iha (Ind.)

The Okinawa at-large district is a constituency of the House of Councillors in the Diet of Japan (national legislature). It consists of the entire prefecture of Okinawa and was created in 1970 following the agreement between US president Richard Nixon and prime minister Eisaku Satō on restoration of Japanese sovereignty over the Ryūkyū islands. Okinawa is represented by two Councillors electing one every three years.

Single-member districts for the House of Councillors ([参議院]一人区, [sangiin] ichininku) usually get higher attention in House of Councillors elections because they are easier to swing completely than multi-member districts and thus play a decisive role for the outcome of elections. As a result of the concentrated US military presence in Okinawa, the prefecture has become a focal point of political debate over the mutual security treaty which is the cornerstone of Japanese foreign policy. The district was in many elections contested between only two candidates backed by the major postwar parties, the conservative Liberal Democratic Party (LDP) and the Japan Socialist Party (JSP). The Japanese Communist Party (JCP) in Okinawa unlike in most other districts for national elections cooperated with the Socialists in nominating candidates in the form of the Kakushin Tōitsu (革新統一, "progressive unification").

Current Councillors for Okinawa are:

- Yōichi Iha (Independent; term ends 2022), elected in 2016. A member of the Okinawa Whirlwind caucus in the Diet.
- Tetsumi Takara (Independent; term ends 2025), elected in 2019.

Both Councilors are members of the Okinawa Whirlwind caucus, despite Iha maintaining independence from the Okinawa Social Mass Party.

== Elected Councillors ==
| Class of 1974 | Election year | Class of 1971 |
| #1 (1970: #1, 4-year term) | Election year | #1 (1970: #2, 1-year term) |
|---|---|---|
| Shin’ei Kyan (Indep.) | 1970 by-election | Ichirō Inamine (LDP) |
| Shin’ei Kyan (Indep.) | 1971 | Ichirō Inamine (LDP) |
| Shin’ei Kyan (Indep.) | 1974 | Ichirō Inamine (LDP) |
| Shin’ei Kyan (Indep.) | 1977 | Ichirō Inamine (LDP) |
| Shin’ei Kyan (Indep.) | 1980 | Ichirō Inamine (LDP) |
| Shinjun Ōshiro (LDP) | 1982 by-election | Ichirō Inamine (LDP) |
| Shinjun Ōshiro (LDP) | 1983 | Shin’ei Kyan (Indep.*) |
| Shinjun Ōshiro (LDP) | 1986 | Shin’ei Kyan (Indep.*) |
| Shinjun Ōshiro (LDP) | 1989 | Shin’ei Kyan (Indep.*) |
| Sōkō Shimabuku (Others*) | 1992 | Shin’ei Kyan (Indep.*) |
| Sōkō Shimabuku (Others*) | 1995 | Kantoku Teruya (Indep.) |
| Sōkō Shimabuku (Others*) | 1998 | Kantoku Teruya (Indep.) |
| Sōkō Shimabuku (Others*) | 2001 | Junshirō Nishime (LDP) |
| Keiko Itokazu (Indep.*) | 2004 | Junshirō Nishime (LDP) |
| Aiko Shimajiri (Others*→LDP) | 2007 by-election | Junshirō Nishime (LDP) |
| Aiko Shimajiri (Others*→LDP) | 2007 | Keiko Itokazu (Indep.*) |
| Aiko Shimajiri (Others*→LDP) | 2010 | Keiko Itokazu (Indep.*) |
| Aiko Shimajiri (Others*→LDP) | 2013 | Keiko Itokazu (Indep.*) |
| Yōichi Iha (Indep.) | 2016 | Keiko Itokazu (Indep.*) |
| Yōichi Iha (Indep.) | 2019 | Tetsumi Takara (Indep.) |
