= Aiko Shimajiri =

Japanese politician

- 島尻 安伊子
- Official portrait, 2012

Minister of State for Okinawa and Northern Territories Affairs
- In office 7 October 2015 – 3 August 2016
- Prime Minister: Shinzo Abe
- Preceded by: Shunichi Yamaguchi
- Succeeded by: Yōsuke Tsuruho

Member of the House of Representatives
- Incumbent
- Assumed office 3 November 2021
- Preceded by: Tomohiro Yara
- Constituency: Okinawa 3rd

Member of the House of Councillors
- In office 27 April 2007 – 25 July 2016
- Preceded by: Keiko Itokazu
- Succeeded by: Yōichi Iha
- Constituency: Okinawa at-large

Member of the Naha City Assembly
- In office 2004–2007

Personal details
- Born: 4 March 1965 (age 61) Sendai, Miyagi, Japan
- Party: Liberal Democratic (since 2007)
- Other political affiliations: Democratic (2004–2005); Independent (2005–2007)
- Children: 4
- Education: Sophia University

Aiko Shimajiri (島尻 安伊子, Shimajiri Aiko; born 4 March 1965) is a Japanese politician of the Liberal Democratic Party, who has served as a member of the House of Councillors and the House of Representatives in the Diet (national legislature). Shimajiri was elected for the first time in 2007 and re-elected in 2010 in Okinawa Prefecture constituency. Shimajiri was appointed the Minister of State for Okinawa and Northern Territories Affairs in the cabinet reshuffle on October 7, 2015, and is one of 3 women serving in Shinzo Abe's cabinet.

In an interview following her appointment as the minister of state, Shimajiri stated that she will not deal with issues regarding the construction of new U.S. military facilities in Okinawa.

Shimajiri lost her Diet seat to former Ginowan, Okinawa mayor Yōichi Iha, a critic of the US military presence in Okinawa supported by a coalition of opposition parties, in the 2016 Japanese House of Councillors election. This was viewed by some analysts as a setback for the proposed relocation of Futenma.

House of Councillors
Preceded by Keiko Itokazu	Councillor for Okinawa's at-large district 2007–2016	Succeeded by Yoichi Iha
