= Kiichiro Jahana =

Japanese politician (born 1957)

- 謝花 喜一郎
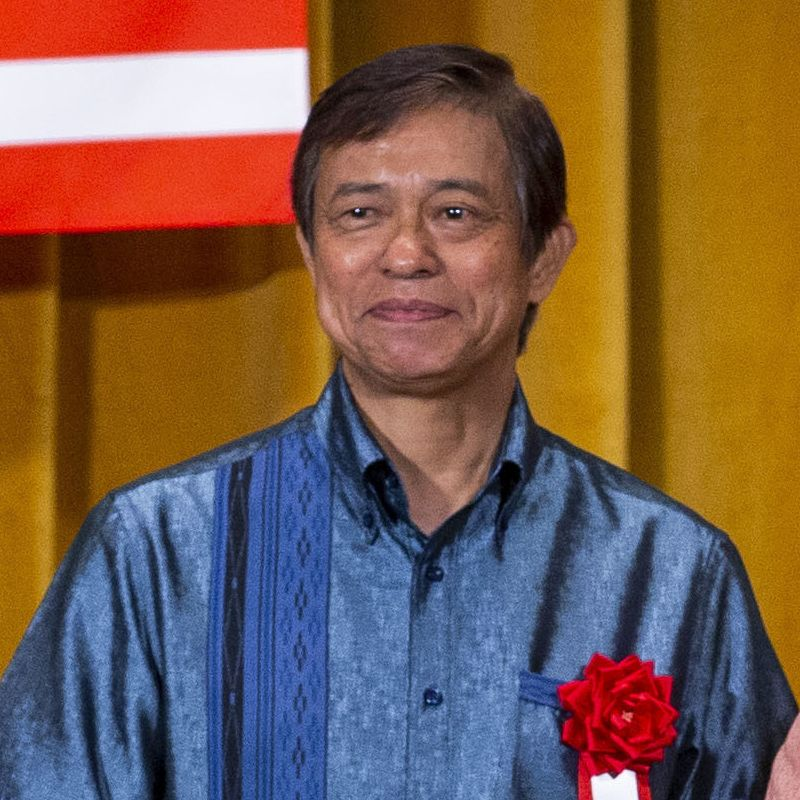
- Jahana in 2018

Interim Governor of Okinawa Prefecture
- In office 8 August 2018 – 12 August 2018
- Monarch: Akihito
- Preceded by: Takeshi Onaga
- Succeeded by: Moritake Tomikawa (interim)

Vice Governor of Okinawa Prefecture
- In office 1 April 2018 – 31 March 2022 Serving with Moritake Tomikawa (until 2018), Yoshimi Teruya (since 2018)
- Governor: Takeshi Onaga
- Preceded by: Ishō Urasaki
- Succeeded by: Takekuni Ikeda

Personal details
- Born: 1957 (age 68–69) Nakijin, Okinawa, USCAR
- Party: Independent
- Education: University of the Ryukyus

Kiichiro Jahana (謝花 喜一郎, Jahana Kiichiro; born 1957) is a Japanese politician. He was the vice governor of Okinawa Prefecture and took over the interim governorship for a few days.

== See also ==
- Takeshi Onaga
- Relocation of Marine Corps Air Station Futenma
