= Takeshi Onaga =

Japanese politician (1950–2018)

- 翁長 雄志
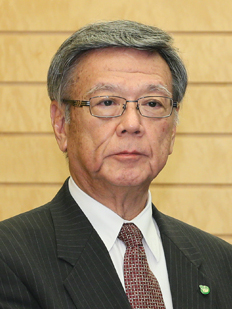
- Onaga in 2016

Governor of Okinawa Prefecture
- In office 10 December 2014 – 8 August 2018
- Monarch: Akihito
- Preceded by: Hirokazu Nakaima
- Succeeded by: Kiichiro Jahana (interim); Moritake Tomikawa (interim); Denny Tamaki

Mayor of Naha
- In office November 2000 – 3 October 2014
- Preceded by: Kōsei Oyadomari
- Succeeded by: Mikiko Shiroma

Member of the Okinawa Prefectural Assembly
- In office 1992–2000
- Constituency: Naha City

Member of the Naha City Assembly
- In office 1985–1992

Personal details
- Born: 2 October 1950 Naha, Ryukyu Islands
- Died: 8 August 2018 (aged 67) Urasoe, Okinawa, Japan
- Party: Independent
- Education: Hosei University
- Website: onagatakeshi.jp

Takeshi Onaga (翁長 雄志, Onaga Takeshi) (2 October 1950 – 8 August 2018) was a Japanese politician who was Governor of Okinawa Prefecture from 2014 to 2018.

Onaga served as a member of the Okinawa Prefectural Assembly from 1992 to 1996 and four terms as mayor of Naha, the capital and largest city of Okinawa Prefecture, from 2000 to 2014 before being elected governor as an independent. Onaga's governorship was characterized by his opposition to the U.S. military presence in Okinawa. Onaga died in office aged 67 from illness in August 2018 and was succeeded by Okinawa 3rd district representative Denny Tamaki.

== Early life ==
Takeshi Onaga was born on 2 October 1950 in Naha, Okinawa, at the time under American military administration after Japan's defeat in World War II. His father, Josei Onaga, was a politician who was once the mayor of Naha, and his mother, Kazuko, was a merchant.

According to his biographer Koji Matsubara, Onaga was interested in politics since his childhood. When he was 12 years old, Onaga told his classmates that he wanted to run for mayor. Onaga pursued higher education at Hosei University in Tokyo, but because Okinawa was still under American occupation unlike the rest of Japan, he required a passport to go to Tokyo.

== Political career ==
Upon graduating from Hosei University, Onaga returned to Okinawa shortly before the United States returned the islands to Japan in 1972. After briefly working for a construction company, Onaga ran and was elected to the Naha City Council in 1985 for the Liberal Democratic Party. Onaga went on to become a member of the Okinawa Prefectural Assembly in 1992.

=== Mayoralty ===
Onaga became the Mayor of Naha in 2000, running as an independent candidate. During his term as mayor, Onaga supported a plan to relocate the Marine Corps Air Station Futenma, located in an urban area near Naha, to a more remote area of the island in Nago. According to his biographer, Onaga gave this support reluctantly. Onaga thought the base was against the will of the Okinawan people but he did not feel as mayor he has the power to oppose the Japanese central government, who supported the move. Onaga served four terms as mayor until he was elected as the Governor of Okinawa Prefecture in 2014.

=== Governorship ===
Onaga was elected to the governorship defeating the incumbent, Hirokazu Nakaima. His campaign was based on opposing the relocation of the Futenma Base within Okinawa, and ending U.S. military presence in Okinawa. In October 2015, Onaga revoked the land reclamation permit needed for continued work on the base. This stance also made him a target of regular smear campaign by some Japanese right-wing activists on the internet. For example, in April 2015, Toshio Tamogami, former chief of the Japanese Air Self-Defense Force tweeted that Onaga's daughter had studied in Beijing and married a Chinese Communist Party (CCP) official, an allegation intended to link Onaga and his opposition to the American bases in Okinawa to the CCP.

== Death ==
Onaga was diagnosed with a pancreatic tumor in April 2018, then had a surgery and returned to work in May. According to The New York Times, Onaga looked "visibly weakened" during a war-memorial service in June.

Onaga died at a hospital in Urasoe on 8 August 2018, four days after announcing his "last resort" of withdrawing planning permission for the construction of the U.S. military . His deputy, Kiichiro Jahana, took over the governorship ad interim, and announced that an election would be held within 50 days. Around 70,000 people rallied in Okinawa on 11 August 2018 in honour of Onaga's memory and his struggle against the relocation of U.S. Marine Corps Air Station Futenma to Henoko Bay in northern Okinawa Island.

Political offices
Preceded by Hirokazu Nakaima	Governor of Okinawa Prefecture; 10 December 2014 – 8 August 2018	Succeeded by Kiichiro Jahana (Interim)
