= Mikiko Shiroma =

Japanese politician

- 城間 幹子

Mayor of Naha
- In office 18 November 2014 – 15 November 2022
- Preceded by: Takeshi Onaga
- Succeeded by: Satoru Chinen

Personal details
- Born: 20 January 1951 (age 75) Izena, USCAR (now Izena, Okinawa, Japan)
- Party: Independent
- Education: Miyagi University of Education
- Website: Official website

Mikiko Shiroma (城間 幹子, Shiroma Mikiko; born 20 January 1951) is a Ryukyuan politician and former mayor of Naha, the capital city of Okinawa Prefecture.
