= Yōichi Iha =

Japanese politician

- 伊波 洋一
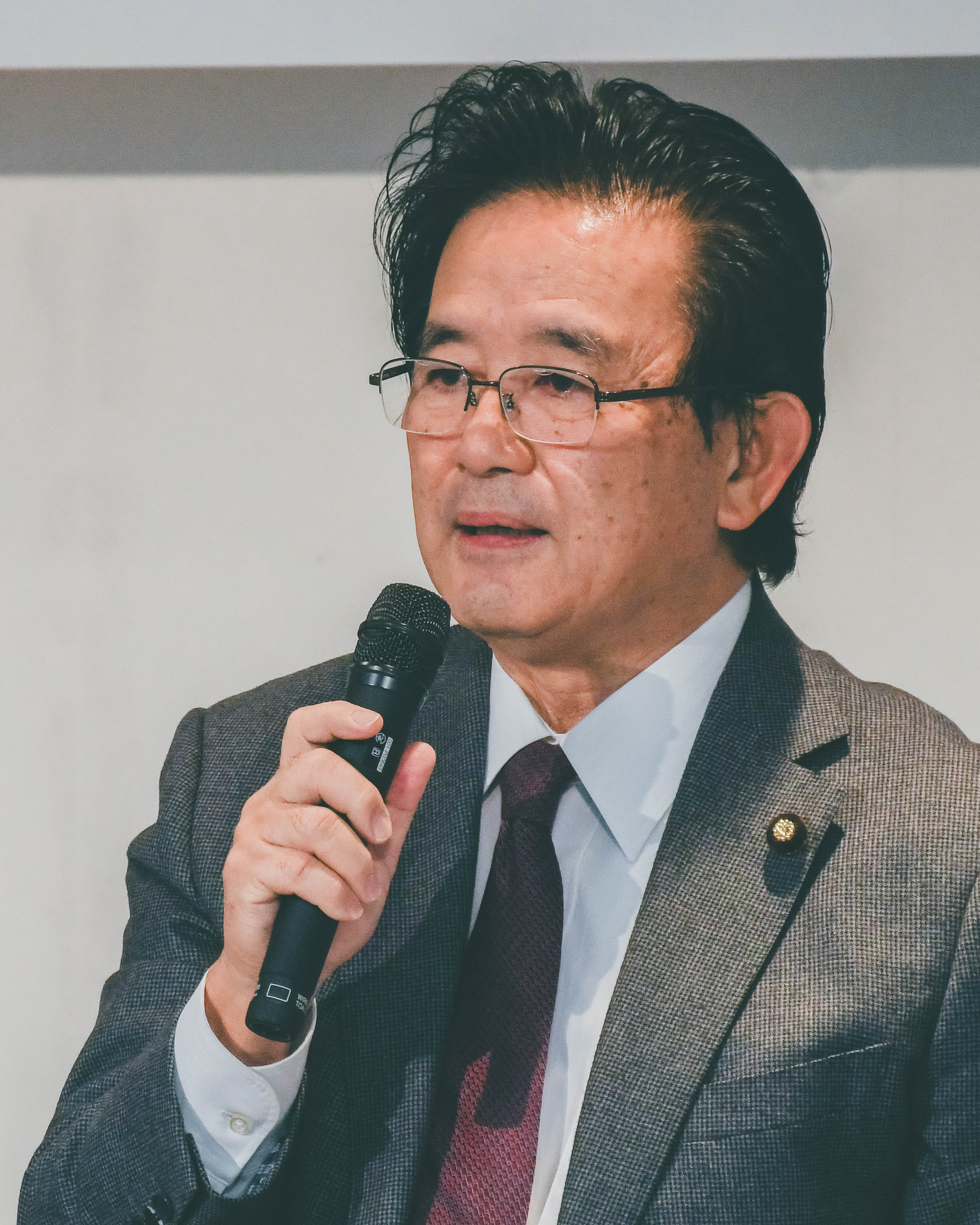
- Iha in 2019

Member of the House of Councillors
- Incumbent
- Assumed office 26 July 2016
- Preceded by: Aiko Shimajiri
- Constituency: Okinawa at-large

Mayor of Ginowan
- In office 28 April 2003 – 18 October 2010
- Preceded by: Seikō Higa
- Succeeded by: Takeshi Asato

Member of the Okinawa Prefectural Assembly
- In office June 1996 – April 2003
- Constituency: Ginowan City

Personal details
- Born: 4 January 1952 (age 74) Ginowan, Okinawa, USCAR
- Party: Independent
- Education: University of the Ryukyus

Yōichi Iha (伊波 洋一, Iha Yōichi; born 4 January 1952) is a Japanese politician. He has represented the Okinawa at-large district in the Japanese House of Councillors since 2016. He also served two terms as the mayor of Ginowan, Okinawa.
