= Relocation of Marine Corps Air Station Futenma =

Political dispute in Okinawa, Japan

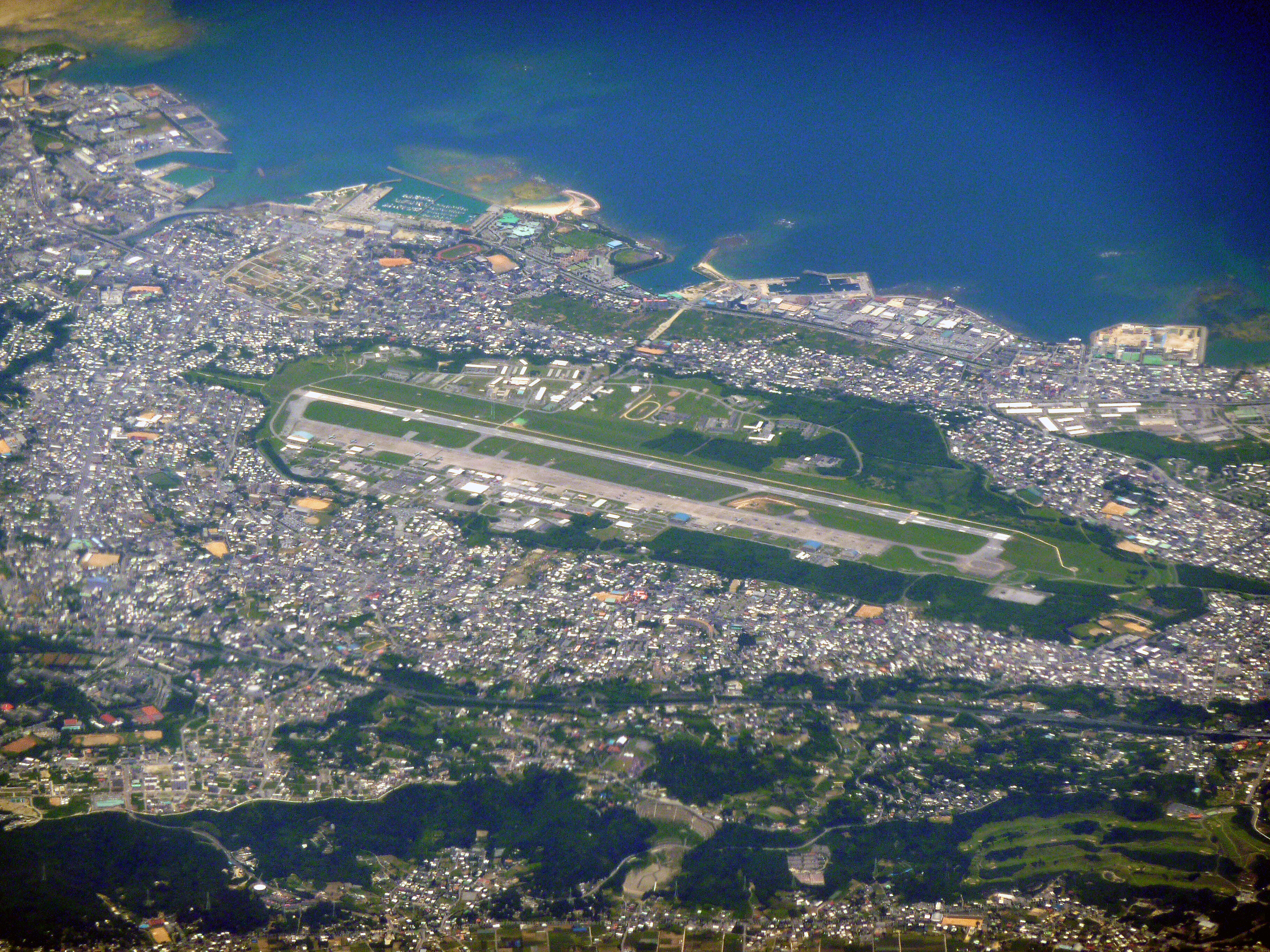
Aerial view of Marine Corps Air Station Futenma in 2010

Over the last five decades there have been various plans to move Marine Corps Air Station Futenma (海兵隊普天間航空基地, Kaiheitai Futenma Kōkū Kichi), a United States Marine Corps base located within the urban area of Ginowan City (pop. 93,661) in Okinawa, Japan. The current proposal for a new site in Henoko Bay, Nago, has faced opposition from Okinawans and the local government who wish for the new base to be located off the island altogether.

In October 2015, following a temporary halt after negotiations with the government of Okinawa Prefecture, the Japanese central government began work to build the base in Henoko Bay. The issue was taken to court by both parties in November and December. After a tentative court-mediated settlement in March 2016, the national government sued Okinawa governor Takeshi Onaga (翁長 雄志, Onaga Takeshi) in July, and obtained a High Court ruling in September determining that it was illegal for Onaga to revoke his predecessor's permission for landfill work at the new site. The Supreme Court of Japan indicated in December 2016 that it would let this judgment stand, opening a door for the move to proceed. In September 2023, the court ordered the Okinawan government to approve the central government's plan for construction.

== General controversy ==
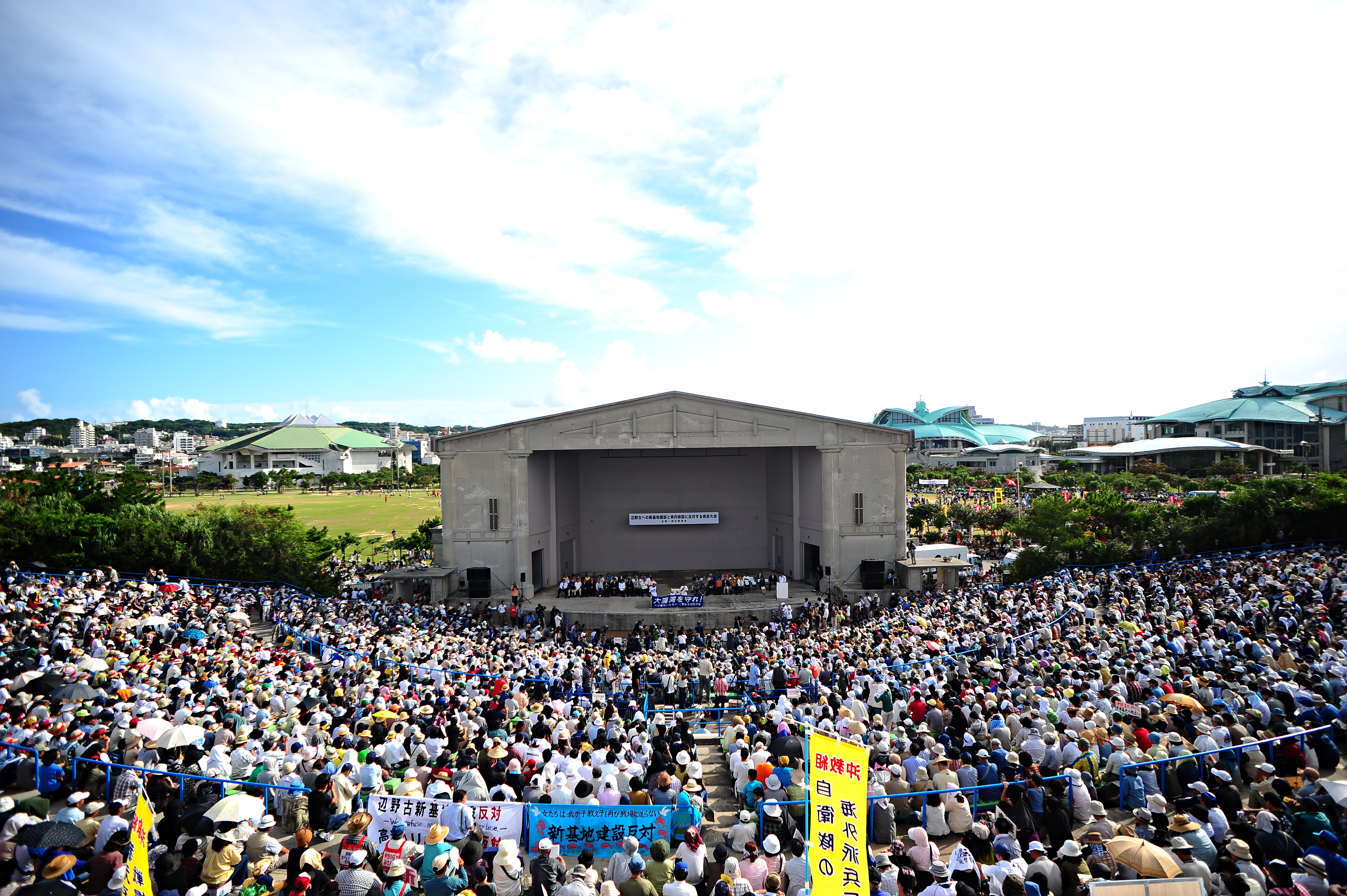
Protest meeting against the base, in Ginowan, November 2009

Okinawa prefecture constitutes 0.6% of Japan's land surface, yet as of 2006, 75% of all USFJ bases were located on Okinawa, and U.S. military bases occupied 18% of the main island.

There is local opposition in Okinawa to the construction of a new base; more than 76 percent of the population having expressed their opposition to a move to Henoko.

== History ==
=== Henoko Bay plan ===
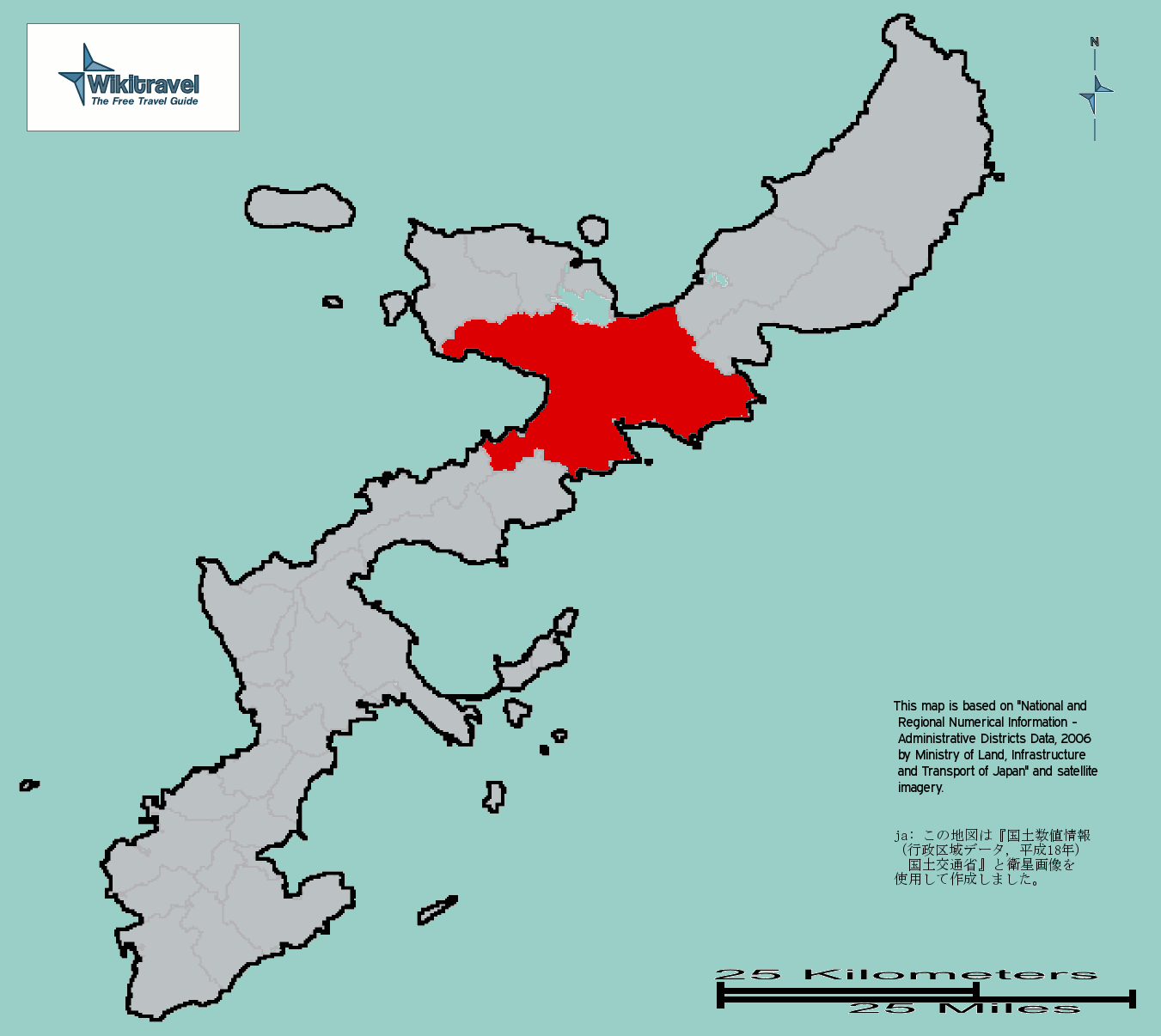
Nago, Okinawa Island

==== Plan secretly formulated in 1960s ====
Declassified reports indicate the plan to build new runways at Henoko Bay was secretly formulated in the 1960s during the U.S. military occupation and administration of the islands. Building an expanded base at Henoko has been called the "only solution" to resolving the issues at Futenma. The U.S. military had originally proposed constructing "an offshore landfill facility with two 3,000-meter runways, a large military port and an integrated ammunition bunker capable of storing nuclear weapons."

"The newly obtained 40-page document contains a memorandum approving the plan sent by Earle Wheeler, chairman of the Joint Chiefs of Staff, to Defense Secretary Robert McNamara on July 20, 1967, before the reversion of Okinawa to Japan from U.S. control.

A separate 260-page report revealed the master plan for U.S. Navy facilities of the base expansion that was submitted by an American company under contract to the Navy in 1966.

The report states that the U.S. government "should continue to emphasize to the government of Japan that Japan's security is in large part dependent on the maintenance of a substantial U.S. military posture."

The base expansion plan was abandoned for a few reasons. One was local opposition and criticism over the seizure of civilian-owned land. Also, as the Vietnam War was ending, the US drawdown in forces reduced the need for the base and constrained budgetary resources.

==== 1996–1997 ====
In December 1996, as part of the Defense Policy Review Initiative (DPRI), the Japanese and U.S. governments decided that the Futenma base should be moved to an off-shore location in the Oura Bay of Henoko (Ourawan in Japanese and ʻUdaang in Okinawan; often called Henoko Bay), in Nago, a relatively less populated area of the northern part of the island, 'in order to reduce military impact to the populated communities of southern Okinawa'.

This was and remains a controversial decision, since the projected site involved construction on a coral reef and seagrass beds inhabited by the dugong, an endangered marine mammal protected under Japanese law and U.S. law. The environmental impact extends beyond the coral reef and seagrass beds, with there expected to be waste dumping, the disruption of fisheries, and an overall decrease in biological diversity. In October 2015, The Japan Times mentioned that 'two members of a governmental panel monitoring the environmental impact of the Futenma base move within Okinawa Prefecture (had) admitted to accepting donations from contractors involved.'

In a non-binding referendum conducted in December 1997, the majority of Nago residents voted against the Henoko relocation plan. However, a few days later on 24 December, Nago Mayor Tetsuya Higa ignored the referendum results and accepted the relocation plan, resigned, and moved to Tokyo. The next year Tateo Kishimoto was elected mayor of Nago and tried to find compromises regarding the relocation. So did his successor Yoshikazu Shimabukuro, at a time when the Prefecture Governor, Masahide Ota, was opposed to the Henoko move. The next mayor too, Susumu Inamine, was opposed to it and he was elected twice with a high margin on an anti-base agenda.

=== Camp Schwab plan (2005–2006) ===
On 26 October 2005, the governments of the United States and Japan agreed to move the new site for Futenma from the reef area off Henoko to the interior and coastal portions of the existing Marine base at Camp Schwab, just a few hundred meters away from the previously planned offshore facility. One of the cited reasons for the change was to reduce the engineering challenge associated with building a runway on reefs in deep water: experts estimate that rather than the 15-plus years required to construct a new airbase at the previous reef location, the Camp Schwab plan will enable Futenma to be moved sooner. These plans were also accelerated when a CH-53D Sea Stallion transport helicopter experienced mechanical issues and crashed on the campus of Okinawa International University in August 2004: all three crew members were injured but there were no civilian injuries.

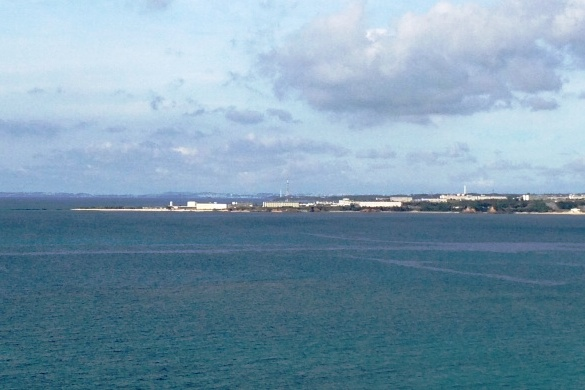
Camp Schwab and the Henoko Cape, 2013

The mayor of Nago, which hosts Camp Schwab, formally agreed to accept the move when he signed an agreement with Defense Minister Nukaga on 8 April 2006. Mayor Shimabukuro was later joined by all five of the major mayors of northern Okinawa. Although some all-Okinawa public opinion polls indicated that majority of Okinawans wish the based moved out of the prefecture entirely, all 12 elected mayors of northern Okinawa publicly accepted the new relocation plan, exposing a range of conflicting opinions among Okinawans: those who maintain that military facilities and associated public works infrastructure benefit the island's economy, environmentalists, and those who either object or are critical to the U.S. military presence on ideological grounds or on rooted sentiments.

The relocation plans again gained national attention in 2009 when the Democratic Party of Japan included a promise to move Futenma off the island in its manifesto. After winning the election, Prime Minister Yukio Hatoyama found the promise hard to honor and resigned after only eight months in office when it was confirmed that the base would not move off Okinawa. At one point in 2009, Osaka Prefecture governor Toru Hashimoto even publicly proposed moving the base's functions to Osaka's Kansai International Airport (which is on an artificial island), remarking that "the burden [of bases on Okinawa] should be spread more evenly throughout Japan."

Susumu Inamine, the mayor of Nago city elected on 24 January 2010, and reelected again on 19 January 2013, is against the Henoko relocation plan and argued for moving Futenma outside of Okinawa. The local assembly of Nago voted against the plan, and the Okinawa Prefectural Assembly also formally asked the prime minister to move the base out of the prefecture. On 17 May 2010, the anniversary of the reversion of Okinawa to Japan, an estimated 17,000 Okinawans encircled the base in protest. This was the fifth time such an action took place.

=== Guam and Okinawa plan (2011–2012) ===
In 2011, the chairman and ranking member of the United States Senate Committee on Armed Services called for an alternative plan where Futenma aircraft would move to Kadena Air Base while the current aircraft at Kadena would move to Andersen Air Force Base in Guam. However, US and Japan governments remained with the relocation plan as previously agreed and the fate of Futenma remained unresolved through early 2012, with the U.S. insisting that the Marine Corps' aviation elements be kept on the island while the Okinawa Prefectural government and Nago City government would like the base moved off the island. The US alleged that the aviation elements should be in close proximity to the ground and logistics elements of the Marine Air Ground Task Force, and the Japanese government of the time maintained the plan to keep the replacement airbase within Okinawa.

The US and Japan delinked the move of Futenma from plans to decrease the number of Marines stationed on Okinawa under a troop redeployment agreement in April 2012. Under the terms of the new U.S.-Japan agreement, 5,000 U.S. Marines were to be moved to Guam and 4,000 U.S. Marines to other Pacific locations such as Hawaii or Australia, while some 10,000 Marines would remain on Okinawa. No timetable for the Marines redeployment was announced, but the Washington Post reported that U.S. Marines would leave Futenma as soon as suitable facilities on Guam and elsewhere would be ready. The relocation move was expected to cost 8.6 billion US Dollars and included a $3.1 billion cash commitment from Japan for the move to Guam as well as for developing joint training ranges on Guam and on Tinian and Pagan in the Commonwealth of the Northern Mariana Islands.

During this period, the US began to deploy Bell Boeing V-22 Osprey tilt rotor aircraft to Futenma in 2012, allowing the Marines (and the MV-22B Osprey aircraft) from Okinawa to train all along the length of Japan and around the entire Asia-Pacific region, with the Osprey's greatly increased speed, lift capabilities and range.

=== "Okinawa Consolidation Plan" (2013–2015) ===
In April 2013, the United States and Japan released an "Okinawa Consolidation Plan," which detailed more general positions of the 1996 DPRI and 2006 SACO plans, specifying 2,500 acres of land to be returned Japan. This included returning the entirety of MCAS Futenma by "Japanese Fiscal Year 2022 or later" once the "replacement facilities in Okinawa are provided." As part of the original DPRI plan, Futenma's KC-130J 'Super Hercules' refueling transport squadron moved to MCAS Iwakuni on mainland Japan in July 2014. The plan also included, as in previous plans, moving Marine Corps airfield facilities to Camp Schwab at Henoko. The proposed location within Camp Schwab is insulated from potential protesters, unlike the previous proposed location in Henoko Bay where local civilians were able to enter the survey area.

In December 2013, Okinawa Governor Hirokazu Nakaima approved a landfill proposal by the Japanese government to permit construction of new military facilities in Henoko, a move praised by the US. The decision came two days after Tokyo earmarked 348 billion yen for Okinawa's economic development and despite earlier campaign promises by Nakaima to move the base outside of the prefecture all together. Over 2,000 citizens responded immediately with a protest in front of the prefectural administration building, with around 1,000 forcing their way into the building to stage a sit-in. The head of the Nago municipal assembly responded that "what the governor has done is unforgivable. Residents who are opposed will surely resort to the use of force, such as blocking roads to stop this from happening." The Okinawa Prefectural Assembly adopted a resolution by a 24–21 vote calling for Nakaima's resignation, stating that he broke an election promise by agreeing to the move.

Susumu Inamine, Mayor of Nago, where the new facility is to be built, opposed the plan, while Mayor Atsushi Sakima, of Ginowan where the current facility is located, supported the plan. Nago held a mayoral election in January 2014, in which Inamine's main rival, former Vice Mayor Bunshin Suematsu, supported the plan as "a significant step toward reducing the dangers posed by Futenma." Inamine won the election and subsequently vowed to block any landfill plans in the city, but the national government said it would continue with the plan and that the authority to approve the plan rested at the time with the governor of Okinawa.

Takeshi Onaga, running on an anti-base platform, won the November 2014 gubernatorial elections in Okinawa promising to veto any landfill work needed for the new base to be built. In March 2015, Onaga ordered a suspension of work on the new base, and in August 2015 the Japanese government agreed to halt construction activities temporarily while talks with Okinawan officials continued.

=== Recent development ===
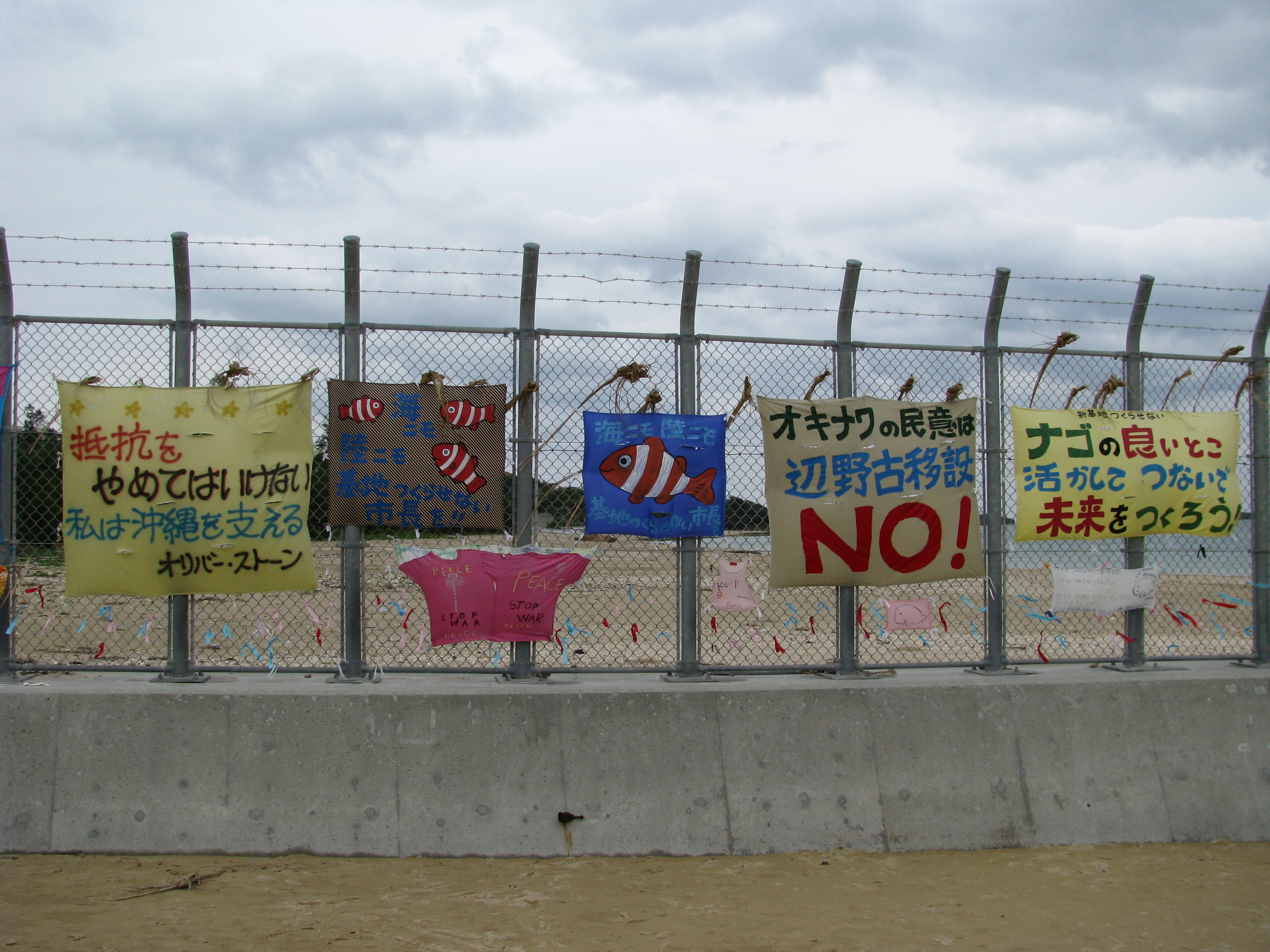
Posters opposing the base relocation in Henoko (Henoko, Nago, 2013)

The Japanese central government began work on 29 October 2015 to build the base in the Henoko coastal area of Nago, to replace the Futenma Air Station, despite strong opposition among Okinawans and political and legal action initiated by Governor Takeshi Onaga, who insisted the move was 'extremely unjust'.

In November 2014 Takeshi Onaga, who had run for election on an anti-base platform, was elected Governor of Okinawa. His predecessor and main opponent in the gubernatorial race, Hirokazu Nakaima, had previously opposed the relocation plans himself too; but 11 months before the 2014 election, Nakaima approved a landfill permit allowing the relocation plans to progress, two days after Tokyo earmarked 348 billion yen for Okinawa's economic development.

On 15 July 2015's daily press briefing at the White House, US Navy Admiral John Kirby said in regards to opposition: "Construction of the facility is the meaningful result of many years of sustained work between the United States and Japan, and our understanding is that construction's going to continue. This is something we've talked at length about with the Government of Japan. Certainly I've seen the reports and understand some of the angst by people in Okinawa, but nothing's changed about our approach or our policies with respect to that facility. We have, through many different fora, consistently talked about the importance of this relocation and the degrees to which it helps strengthen our alliance with Japan."

The opposition to the move has received notable support outside of Okinawa, including those of animation film maker Hayao Miyazaki, who will help 'a fund set up to oppose the relocation', of Nobel Prize winner Kenzaburo Oe and of musician Ryuichi Sakamoto. The latter, whose October 2015 single is a charity work in favor of the Henoko Fund, is "a critic of the national security legislation enacted (in September 2015) (and) said the issue of the heavy U.S. military presence on Okinawa and the contentious security laws share the same root."

In November 2015, George Washington University professor Mike Mochizuki explained that "an option of setting up a helicopter base at Marine Corps Camp Schwab in Nago could be considered instead of the current plan to build runways in the camp that would extend offshore" "The option was included in a 1996 report by the Special Action Committee on Okinawa between the two countries.", noted the Japan Times.

Greenpeace too gathered signatures of people from 164 countries, in a call for the move to be stopped and the coral reef and dugong habitat preserved.

In November 2015, the Asahi Shimbun called Japanese Government agenda on the matter an 'obsession'.

"Japanese officials in the ruling and opposition parties had in the past suggested Kyushu and Hokkaido as alternatives to Henoko." In November 2015 a group of 'traditionally anti-base activist' citizens from Kansai called for Futenma's replacement airstrip to be built in Osaka, in "hope to lighten Okinawa's base-hosting burden and prevent an escalation of violence."

In December 2015, a group of 70 American personalities, including the filmmaker Oliver Stone, criticized the U.S. Ambassador to Japan, Caroline Kennedy, for the support she expressed to the contentious U.S.-Japan relocation plan.

In June 2016, massive protests took place after the rape and murder of an Okinawan woman by an American base staff member: "The incidents seem certain to complicate efforts to move a Marine air base at Okinawa, to a less densely populated part of the island. Onaga and a majority of Okinawa residents want the base moved off the island.", commented USA Today.

On 14 December 2018, landfill on a controversial new U.S. military runway that will one day facilitate the move and closure of Marine Corps Air Station Futenma began in Okinawa following years of protests and legal challenges. Okinawa Gov. Denny Tamaki showed his resolve to counter Tokyo's efforts to press ahead with a controversial U.S. military base relocation project in the prefecture. It was "intolerable" that the Japanese government started dumping soil into the landfill off the Henoko coastal district in Nago, Okinawa Prefecture, as part of the relocation project, Tamaki said at a protest rally held in Henoko. "It's an outrage committed by the state."

On 4 September 2023, the Supreme Court of Japan ordered the government of Okinawa Prefecture to approve the Government of Japan's plan despite protests by locals. The ruling upheld a High Court ruling in March that the central government's plan and its instruction for Okinawa's approval are valid.

== See also ==
- Japan–United States relations
