= Japan National Route 58 =

National highway in Kagoshima and Okinawa prefectures, Japan

National Route 58
- 国道58号
- Japan National Route 58 highlighted in red

Route information
- Length: 245.2 km (152.4 mi)
- Existed: 1972–present

Major junctions
- From: National Route 3 / National Route 10 in Kagoshima
- To: National Route 330 / National Route 331 / National Route 390 in Naha

Section 1
- From: National Route 3 / National Route 10 in Kagoshima
- From: Port of Kagoshima

Section 2
- From: Nishinoomote, Kagoshima
- From: Minamitane, Kagoshima

Section 3
- From: Amami, Kagoshima
- From: Setouchi, Kagoshima

Section 4
- From: Kunigami, Okinawa
- Major intersections: National Route 331; National Route 505; National Route 449; Okinawa Expressway
- From: National Route 330 / National Route 331 / National Route 390 in Naha

Location
- Country: Japan

Highway system
- National highways of Japan; Expressways of Japan
← National Route 57	→ National Route 101

National Route 58 (国道58号, Kokudō Gojūhachi-gō) is a Japanese national highway connecting the capital cities Kagoshima and Naha of Kagoshima Prefecture and Okinawa Prefecture, respectively. With a total length of 884.4 kilometers (549.5 mi), it is the longest national highway in Japan, though it measures only 245.2 kilometers (152.4 mi) on land. The highway begins at an intersection with National Routes 3 and 10 in Kagoshima. From Kagoshima, it travels southwest along the first island chain that divides the Pacific Ocean from the East China Sea. From the north to the south, it has sections on the islands of Tanegashima, Amami Ōshima, and finally, Okinawa. On Okinawa it ends at an intersection with National Routes 330, 331, and 390 in Naha.

== Route description ==
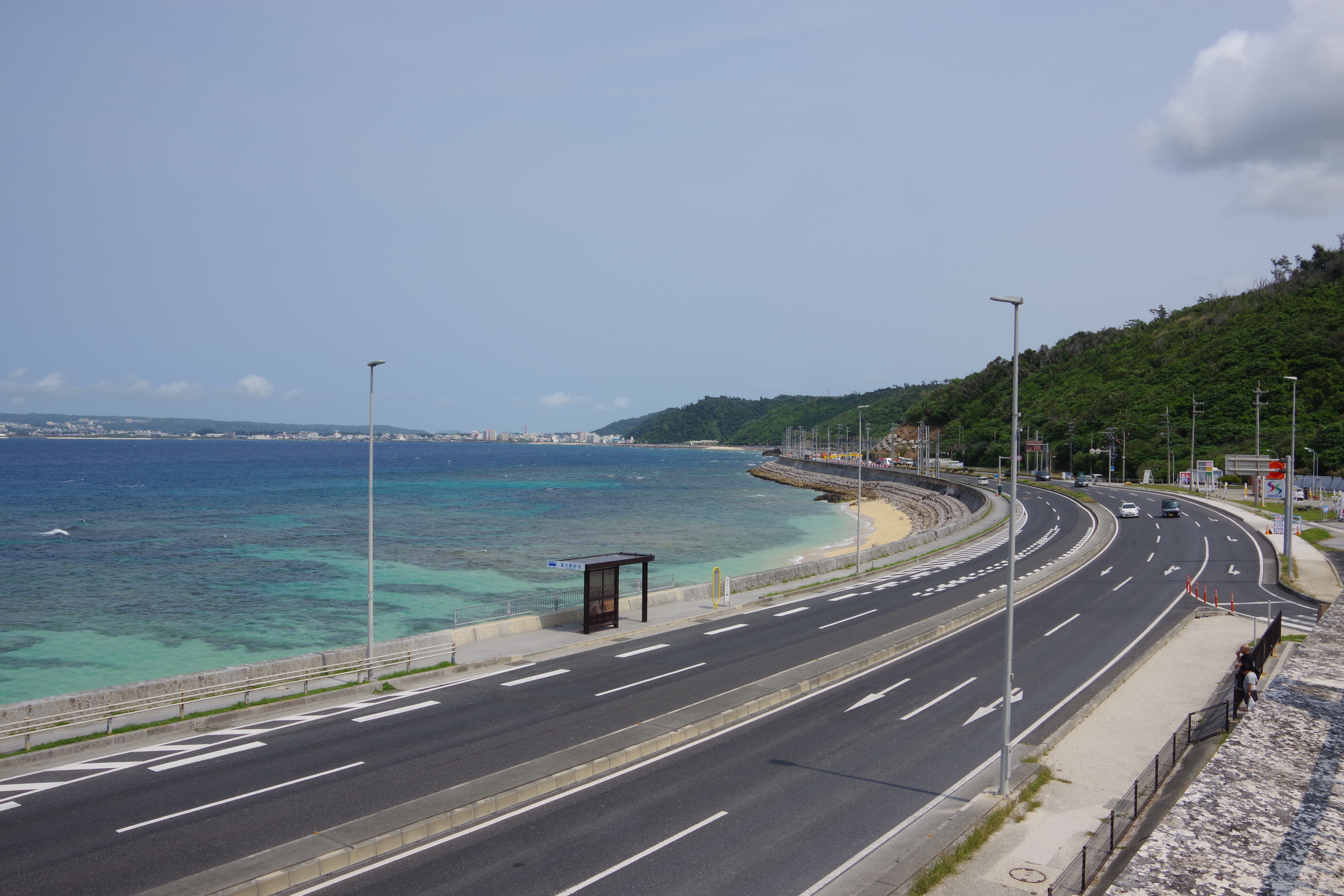
National Route 58 as seen from Michinoeki Kyoda in Nago

This unusual, yet scenic, island highway is made up of several disconnected segments across the islands of Kyūshū, Tanegashima, Amami Ōshima, and Okinawa. The road has a total length of 245.2-kilometer-long (152.4 mi) on land, but it has a length of 884.4 kilometers (549.5 mi) when its maritime sections are included into its total length, making it the longest national highway in Japan. It originates in the prefectural capital of Kagoshima in Kagoshima Prefecture and terminates in Naha, the capital of Okinawa Prefecture.

=== Kagoshima Prefecture ===
At its northern terminus, National Route 58 meets National Routes 3, 10, 224, 225, and 226. The segment in the city of Kagoshima has a length of about 700 meters (2,300 ft) and also carries National Route 224 towards the Port of Kagoshima. At the port, National Route 224 leaves National Route 58, continuing by ferry to the city of Tarumizu beyond the stratovolcano, Sakurajima.

Heading south by ferry, the highway resumes its land route in Nishinoomote on the northern end of Tanegashima. It travels alongside the western coast of the island within Nishinoomote. Upon crossing into the town, Nakatane, the highway ventures inland, heading towards the central district of the town. Continuing south the highway crosses into the town, Minamitane on the southern end of Tanegashima. After traveling through the center of Minamitane, the highway turns northwest and heads towards the west coast of the island where the maritime section of the highway resumes at the Port of Shimama. Unlike the previous maritime section, no ferry carries the highway from Shimama to its next land segment on Amami Ōshima. In all, the highway has a length of 49.7 kilometers (30.9 mi) on Tanegashima.

Resuming its land route in the Amami Ōshima city of Amami, the highway travels southeast across the island from its northeastern tip. The highway crosses through the town of Tatsugo and then returns into the city of Amami. After passing through the central part of the city, the highway curves to the south, traveling towards the island's eastern coast. It then curves to the west, heading towards the south-central part of the island. It curves to the south once and crosses into Setouchi. Upon reaching the island's southern coast, the highway curves to the southwest, heading towards the Setouchi's central district on the southwestern end of Amami Ōshima. In the center of the town the highway's land section ends once again. Like the previous maritime section, there is no ferry between Amami Ōshima and the highway's land section on Okinawa. In all, the highway has a length of 72.7 kilometers (45.2 mi) on Amami Ōshima.

=== Okinawa Prefecture ===
The highway's final land segment starts near the Port of Oku in Kunigami at the northern tip of Okinawa Island. It travels around the edges of Cape Hedo from the point's eastern side to the west coast of the cape and then curves to the southwest running along the western coast of the island to the highway's southern terminus in Naha. Further to the south along the coast, the highway crosses into the village of Ōgimi. In the village the highway meets National Route 331 on the northern shore of Shioya Bay. As the highway leaves the village and crosses in the city of Nago, it curves to the west. It then meets National Route 505, and proceeds to the south, leaving the coast and crossing the bottom of the Motobu Peninsula.

As the highway approaches central Nago, it has an intersection with the Nago-higashi Bypass, an alternate route of National Route 58. Upon reaching central Nago, the highway meets the Nago Bypass, an alternate route of National Route 449. Curving to the south, the highway meets the mainline of National Route 449. Here the highway meets the western coast of Okinawa once more and continues traveling alongside it away from central Nago. Near the southern limits of the city the highway meets the northern end of the Okinawa Expressway, a tolled, limited-access highway that parallels National Route 58 to the east from Nago to Naha. The national highway continues south along the coast passing through the rural villages of Onna and Yomitan.

In the town of Kadena, the highway curves its way around the northwestern and western edges of the United States Air Force's Kadena Air Base. Proceeding south, the highway then goes through the town of Chatan and its American Village, a shopping and entertainment district that boast American themes. The town is also home to the United States Marine Corps Camp Lester. The highway curves to the southwest after leaving Chatan and entering the city of Ginowan, home to the Marine Corps Air Station Futenma. The highway travels along the northern edge of the installation, here an auxiliary route of National Route 58, the Ginowan Bypass, travels further to the north along the coast. The two highways meet after they cross into the city of Urasoe. Another US military installation, Camp Kinser, is located to the west of the National Route 58 in Urasoe while the central district of the city lies to the east of the route.

Crossing into Naha, the last stretch of the highway is six lanes wide in the city. The highway is flanked by shops and sites that display the influence the American occupation had on the city. The highway ends at a junction just north of Meiji Bridge with National Routes 330, 331, and 390.

== History ==
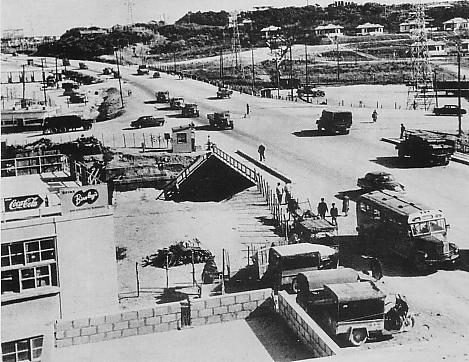
Government Highway 1 in 1954

The precursor to what would eventually become National Route 58 on Okinawa was originally established in the 15th century during the reign of Shō Kinpuku, ruler of the Ryukyu Kingdom. Shō Kinpuku ordered the construction of a road, called the Yanbaru-kokudō (やんばる国道) that traveled all of the way around Okinawa. National Route 58 is mostly situated along the western route of the Yanbaru-kokudō. The Yanbaru-kokudō was designated as an Okinawa Prefecture Road in 1915 between the cities of Nago and Naha.

The direct predecessors to National Route 58 in Okinawa are Military Road 1, which was established during the Battle of Okinawa and maintained by United States Civil Administration of the Ryukyu Islands, and Government Highway 1, which was maintained by the Government of the Ryukyu Islands until the islands were returned to Japan. The highway functioned as the island's main road during World War II and the subsequent US administration of the region. Military Road 1 was captured during the early stages of the Battle of Okinawa and it was quickly redeveloped by Japanese prisoners of war to facilitate the US effort to capture the island—and occupy it. The highway was mainly developed as a high-speed logistics route for the US military that could carry vehicles weighing up to 35 tons. It was re-designated as Government Highway 1 during the civil administration of the island, but the US military's vehicles still took priority over the local Okinawan driving community, who were not allowed to pass US military convoys and vehicles. After the return of the Ryukyu Islands from the United States to Japan on 15 May 1972, the aforementioned highways were all re-designated as a part of National Route 58. It remains the only Japanese national highway to be given a two-digit number following the reclassification of the Primary and Secondary National Highways as the General National Highways in 1965. Until 30 July 1978, traffic on National Route 58 in Okinawa Prefecture drove on the right rather than the left. After the 730 switch, Okinawa joined the rest of Japan in driving on the left in accordance to the Vienna Convention on Road Traffic.

== Major intersections ==
The list below does not account for distances on the highway's maritime sections.

Prefecture	Location	km	mi	Destinations	Notes
Kagoshima	Kagoshima	0.0	0.0	National Route 10 – to National Route 3, Kumamoto, Satsumasendai, Miyazaki, Kirishima	Northern terminus; northern end of National Route 224 concurrency
Kagoshima	Kagoshima	0.1	0.062	Kagoshima Prefecture Route 25 – Kamō, Yoshida, Hioki, Kagoshima-Chūō Station	
Kagoshima	Kagoshima	0.6	0.37	Kagoshima Prefecture Route 204 north – Sakurajima Ferry; Kagoshima Prefecture Route 214 south – Makurazaki, Ibusuki	
Kagoshima	Kagoshima	0.7	0.43	Kagoshima Port	Southern end of National Route 224 concurrency
Kagoshima Bay / East China Sea				Kagoshima–Nishinoomote ferry	
Kagoshima	Nishinoomote	0.7	0.43	Kagoshima Prefecture Route 581 north – Kunigami; Kagoshima Prefecture Route 582 south – Minamitane, Nakatane	
Kagoshima	Nishinoomote	1.4	0.87	Kagoshima Prefecture Route 75 south – Iseki, Anno	
Kagoshima	Nishinoomote	1.7	1.1	Kagoshima Prefecture Route 582 north – Kunigami, Nishinoomote Port	
Kagoshima	Nishinoomote	2.3	1.4	Kagoshima Prefecture Route 76 south – Cosmoport Tanegashima	
Kagoshima	Nakatane	18.1	11.2	Kagoshima Prefecture Route 583 east – Cosmoport Tanegashima, Jurokuban	
Kagoshima	Nakatane	26.2	16.3	Kagoshima Prefecture Route 588 south – Shimama Port	
Kagoshima	Nakatane	27.5	17.1	Kagoshima Prefecture Route 75 north – Taiyo Village Athletic Park	Northern end of Kagoshima Prefecture Route 75 concurrency
Kagoshima	Nakatane	27.7	17.2	Kagoshima Prefecture Route 75 south – Tanegashima Space Center, Kumano Beach	Southern end of Kagoshima Prefecture Route 75 concurrency
Kagoshima	Minamitane	41.7	25.9	Kagoshima Prefecture Route 586 east – Tanegashima Space Center	
Kagoshima	Minamitane	49.6	30.8	Kagoshima Prefecture Route 75 south – Cape Kadokura	
Kagoshima	Minamitane	50.3	31.3	Kagoshima Prefecture Route 588 north – Nishinoomote, central Nakatane	
Kagoshima	Minamitane	50.4	31.3	Shimama Port	
Pacific Ocean					
Kagoshima	Amami	50.4	31.3	Kagoshima Prefecture Route 601 east – Amami Airport, Cape Ayamaru; Kagoshima Prefecture Route 602 north – Gamozaki Tourist Park	
Kagoshima	Tatsugō	58.8	36.5	Kagoshima Prefecture Route 82 east – Amami Airport, Cape Ayamaru, Amami Park	
Kagoshima	Tatsugō	63.2	39.3	Kagoshima Prefecture Route 81 west – Akina, the Remains of Nanshū Saigō	
Kagoshima	Tatsugō	66.5	41.3	Kagoshima Prefecture Route 611 south – Tagumo, Toguchi	
Kagoshima	Amami	78.1	48.5	Kagoshima Prefecture Route 79 south – Yamato, Oshima Branch Office, Amami City Office; Kagoshima Prefecture Route 81 east – Yamato, Ohama Seaside Park, Naze Port	
Kagoshima	Amami	83.6	51.9	Kagoshima Prefecture Route 607 east – Amami Ōshima Pongee Fabric Dyeing Park, Kominato	
Kagoshima	Amami	98.4	61.1	Kagoshima Prefecture Route 609 east – Yanma, Amami Island	
Kagoshima	Amami	106.7	66.3	Kagoshima Prefecture Route 85 west – Yuwandake Park, Uken	
Kagoshima	Setouchi	121.3	75.4	Kagoshima Prefecture Route 79 north – Uken, Shinokawa; Kagoshima Prefecture Route 626 ends	Northern end of Kagoshima Prefecture Route 626 concurrency
Kagoshima	Setouchi	121.4	75.4	Kagoshima Prefecture Route 626 east – Yadorihama, Honohoshi Beach, Sokaru	Southern end of Kagoshima Prefecture Route 626 concurrency
Pacific Ocean					
Okinawa	Kunigami	121.4	75.4	Okinawa Prefecture Route 70 south	Roadway continues as Okinawa Prefecture Route 70
Okinawa	Kunigami	143.9	89.4	Okinawa Prefecture Route 2 east – Ada	
Okinawa	Ōgimi	159.8	99.3	National Route 331 south – Higashi	
Okinawa	Ōgimi	161.2	100.2	Okinawa Prefecture Route 9 east – Taiho Dam, Higashi	
Okinawa	Nago	166.8	103.6	Okinawa Prefecture Route 14 east – Higashi	
Okinawa	Nago	169.6	105.4	Okinawa Prefecture Route 110 – Kouri Island, Yagaji Island	
Okinawa	Nago	171.0	106.3	National Route 505 west – Ocean Expo Park (Okinawa Churaumi Aquarium), Nakijin	
Okinawa	Nago	173.9	108.1	Okinawa Prefecture Route 71 – Nakijin, central Nago	
Okinawa	Nago	174.4	108.4	National Route 58 south (Nago-higashi Bypass) – Naha, Okinawa	
Okinawa	Nago	177.2	110.1	Okinawa Prefecture Route 84 – central Nago, Ocean Expo Park (Okinawa Churaumi Aquarium)	
Okinawa	Nago	177.7	110.4	National Route 449 west (Nago Bypass) – Motobu	
Okinawa	Nago	178.5	110.9	National Route 449 west – Ocean Expo Park (Okinawa Churaumi Aquarium), Motobu; Okinawa Prefecture Route 91 east – central Nago	
Okinawa	Nago	180.1	111.9	Okinawa Prefecture Route 71 north – central Nago	Northern end of Okinawa Prefecture Route 71 concurrency
Okinawa	Nago	180.6	112.2	Okinawa Prefecture Route 84 west – Nago Castle	
Okinawa	Nago	181.6	112.8	National Route 58 north (Nago-higashi Bypass) / National Route 329 south – Okinawa, Uruma	
Okinawa	Nago	185.6– 187.0	115.3– 116.2	Okinawa Expressway south – Naha, Ishikawa	Kyoda Interchange (E58 exit 10)
Okinawa	Nago	186.1	115.6	Okinawa Prefecture Route 71 south – Ginoza	Southern end of Okinawa Prefecture Route 71 concurrency
Okinawa	Onna	197.3	122.6	Okinawa Prefecture Route 104 south – Kin	
Okinawa	Onna	198.4	123.3	National Route 58 south (Onna Bypass) – Naha, Kadena	
Okinawa	Onna	204.0	126.8	National Route 58 north (Onna Bypass) – Ocean Expo Park (Okinawa Churaumi Aquarium), Nago; Okinawa Prefecture Route 88 south – to Okinawa Expressway, Yaka	
Okinawa	Onna	204.8	127.3	National Route 58 south (Onna-minami Bypass) – Naha, Kadena	
Okinawa	Onna	210.6	130.9	National Route 58 north (Onna-minami Bypass) – Ocean Expo Park (Okinawa Churaumi Aquarium), Nago; Okinawa Prefecture Route 73 east – to Okinawa Expressway, Uruma	
Okinawa	Onna	211.9	131.7	Okinawa Prefecture Route 6 east – Higashionna	Northern end of Okinawa Prefecture Route 6 concurrency
Okinawa	Onna	212.8	132.2	Okinawa Prefecture Route 6 west – Cape Zanpa	Southern end of Okinawa Prefecture Route 6 concurrency
Okinawa	Yomitan	218.2	135.6	Okinawa Prefecture Route 12 west – Cape Zanpa	
Okinawa	Yomitan	220.7	137.1	Okinawa Prefecture Route 6 east – Cape Zanpa	
Okinawa	Yomitan	221.5	137.6	Okinawa Prefecture Route 16 west – Furugen	Northern end of Okinawa Prefecture Route 16 concurrency
Okinawa	Kadena	222.4	138.2	Okinawa Prefecture Route 16 / Okinawa Prefecture Route 74 east – to Okinawa Expressway, Okinawa	Southern end of Okinawa Prefecture Route 16 concurrency
Okinawa	Chatan	227.3	141.2	Okinawa Prefecture Route 23 east – to Okinawa Expressway, Okinawa	
Okinawa	Chatan	229.4	142.5	Okinawa Prefecture Route 24 east – Okinawa	
Okinawa	Chatan	229.7	142.7	Okinawa Prefecture Route 130 east – Kitanakagusuku	
Okinawa	Ginowan	231.6	143.9	National Route 58 south (Ginowan Bypass) – Okinawa Convention Center, Ginowan Seaside Park	
Okinawa	Ginowan	232.3	144.3	Okinawa Prefecture Route 81 east – Futenma	
Okinawa	Ginowan	235.4	146.3	Okinawa Prefecture Route 34 east – Maehara	
Okinawa	Urasoe	236.1	146.7	National Route 58 north (Ginowan Bypass) – Okinawa Convention Center; Okinawa Prefecture Route 153 south – to Okinawa Expressway	
Okinawa	Urasoe	238.9	148.4	Okinawa Prefecture Route 38 east – Nishihara, Urasoe Art Museum	
Okinawa	Naha	241.1	149.8	Okinawa Prefecture Route 82 east – to Okinawa Expressway, Shuri Castle, Shikina-en Royal Garden	
Okinawa	Naha	242.4	150.6	Naha Central Belt Highway east – Makabi	
Okinawa	Naha	242.9	150.9	Okinawa Prefecture Route 29 east – Shuri	
Okinawa	Naha	243.3	151.2	Okinawa Prefecture Route 43 south – Tomari Wharf, Tsushima Maru Memorial Museum	
Okinawa	Naha	243.9	151.6	Okinawa Prefecture Route 221 south / Okinawa Prefecture Route 222 east – Matsuo	
Okinawa	Naha	244.3	151.8	National Route 58 south (Naha West Road) – Wakasa, Naminoue Beach, Fukushūen Garden; Okinawa Prefecture Route 42 south – Okinawa Prefectural Office, Prefectural Office Station, Makishi Public Market, Kokusai Street	
Okinawa	Naha	244.7	152.0	Okinawa Prefecture Route 47 north – Naminoue	
Okinawa	Naha	245.0	152.2	National Route 329 north / National Route 330 south / National Route 507 south (Tsubogawa-Ōdōri) – Yonabaru; National Route 390 west (Sunshine-dōri) – Naha Wharf	Northern end of National Route 329 concurrency
Okinawa	Naha	245.2	152.4	National Route 329 north (Naha-higashi Bypass) – to Okinawa Expressway, Yonabaru, Tomigusuku; National Route 329 ends National Route 331 south / National Route 332 west – Itoman, Naha Airport	Southern terminus; southern end of National Route 329 concurrency, highway continues as National Routes 331 and 332
1.000 mi = 1.609 km; 1.000 km = 0.621 mi: Concurrency terminus; Route transition

== See also ==
- 1996 Padilla car crash
