= Motobu Peninsula =

Peninsula of Okinawa Island

Coordinates: 26°39′N 127°56′E

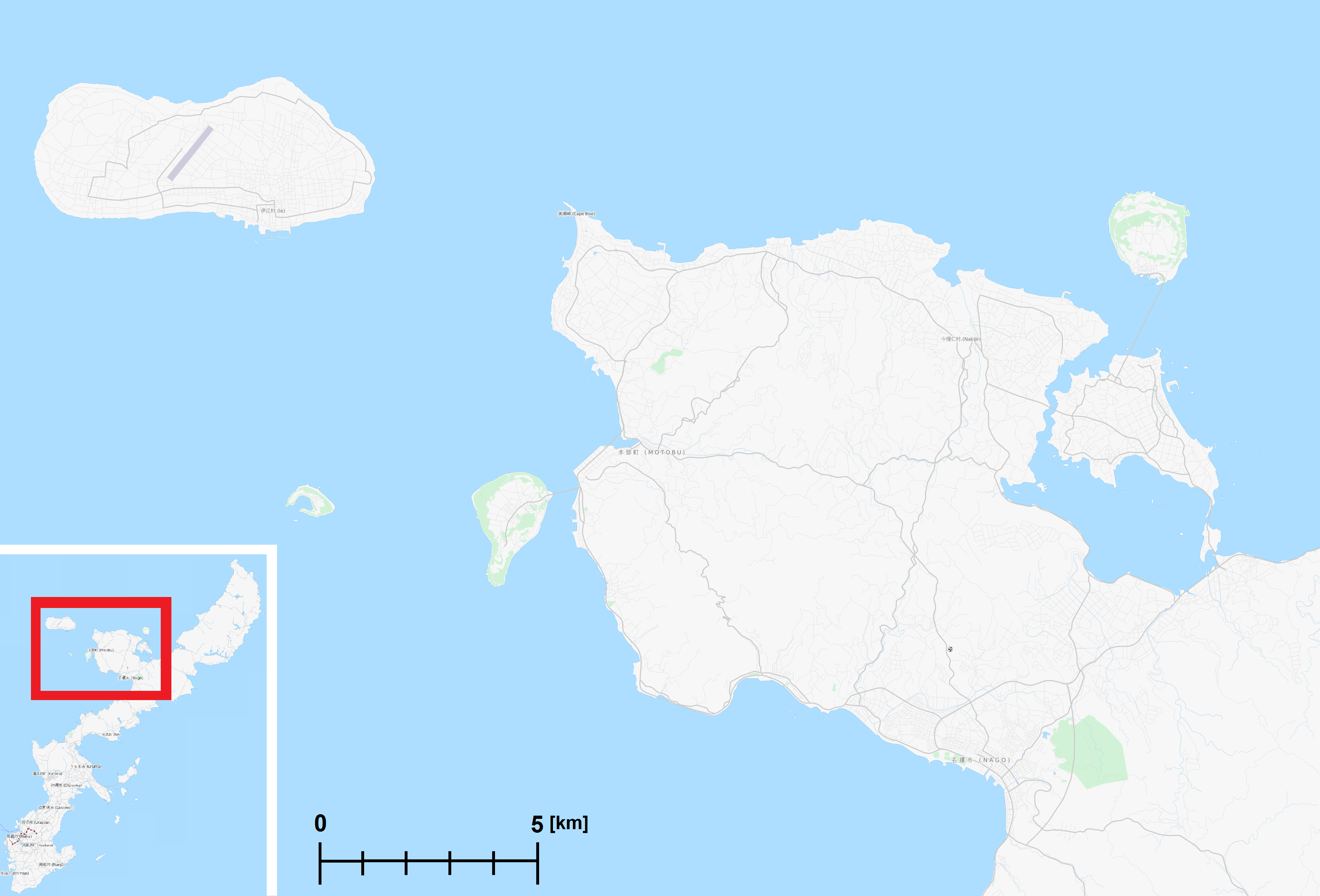
Motobu Peninsula and surrounding islands

The Motobu Peninsula (本部半島, Motobu hantō; Okinawan: Mutubu) is a peninsula in the Yanbaru region of Okinawa Island. It is surrounded by Nago Bay to the east, the Haneda Inland Sea to the north, and the East China Sea to the west. It is mostly mountainous, with a few plains. The peninsula's northeasternmost point is Cape Bise. Its highest point is Mount Yae, whose summit is 593 metres (1,946 ft). Due to a US military communications tower, the summit is off-limits. The peninsula was the center of power for the kingdom of Hokuzan in medieval times, and was the site of fierce fighting during the Battle of Okinawa in 1945.

== Transportation ==
The Okinawa Expressway connects Naha to Nago. Japan National Route 58 crosses the bottom of the Motobu Peninsula. Japan National Route 505 connects Motobu Town to Haneji, as Japan National Route 449 connects Motobu to Nago. Both Route 404 and Route 449 run around the edge of the Motobu Peninsula.

== Sites ==
In the area are Nago Castle and Nakijin Castle. The Native Okinawan Village is also there. Okinawa Churaumi Aquarium features the world's third largest aquarium tank.

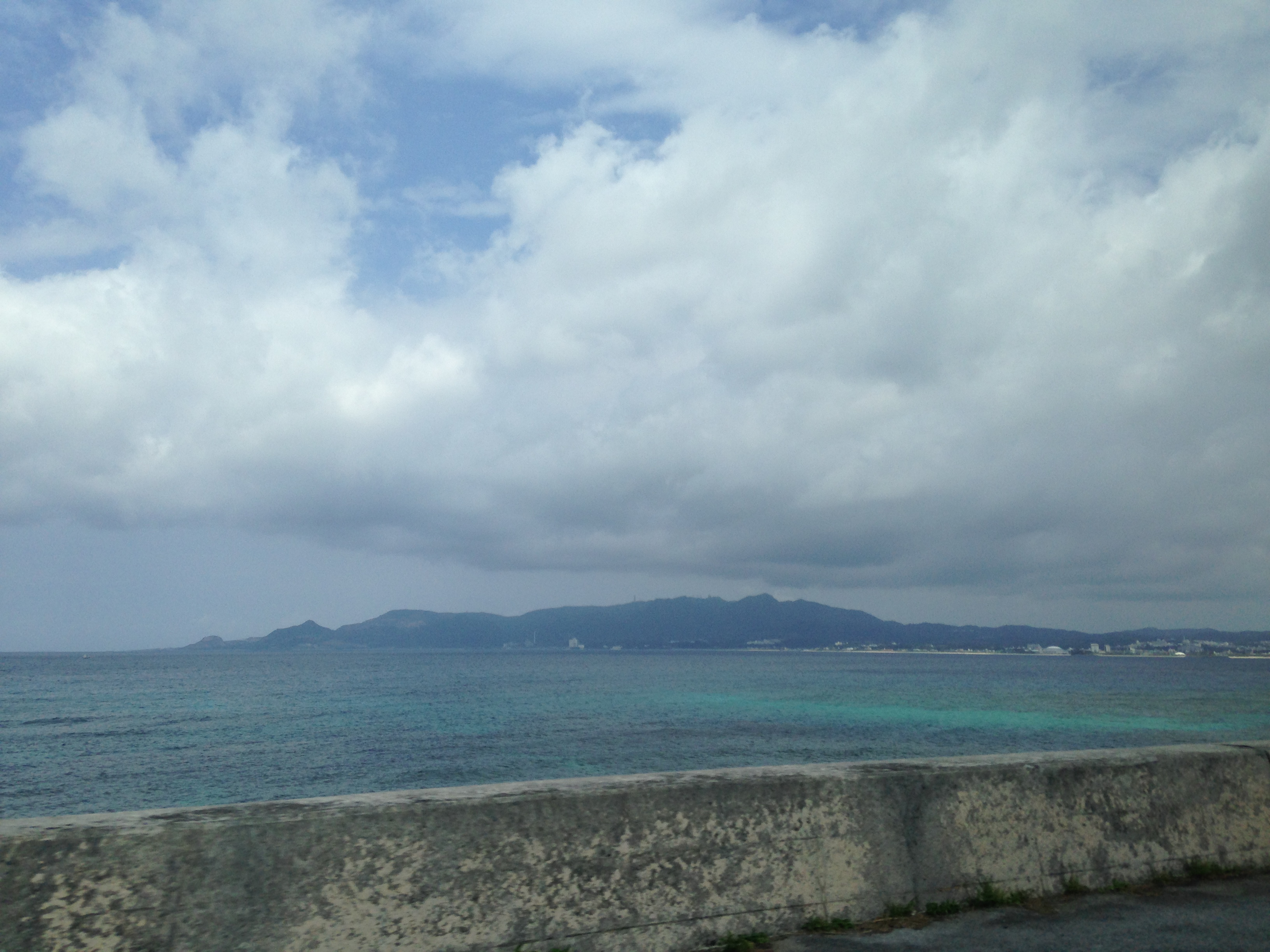
View of the Motobu Peninsula from Onna, Okinawa

=== Rivers ===
- Oigawa River
- Shiokawa River (a national natural treasure, the shortest river in Japan, and has salt water.)

=== Beaches ===
- Uppama Beach
- Emerald beach (inside Ocean Expo Park)
- Shiokawa Beach
- Nagahama Beach
- Forest of the 21st Century Beach

== Geology ==
The east side of the Motobu Peninsula is truncated by the Nago fault, bounding the northwestern coast of Okinawa Island. This area is of zone of Paleozoic metamorphic and igneous rocks. The Pleistocene Ryukyu Group comprises the northern part of the peninsula.

== Municipalities ==
- Motobu
- Nago
- Nakijin

== Events ==
- Invasion of Hokuzan (1416)
- Initial Japanese landing during the Invasion of Ryukyu (1609)
- Fighting on Mount Yae during the Battle of Okinawa (1945)
- Expo '75
- Miss International 1975.

== People ==
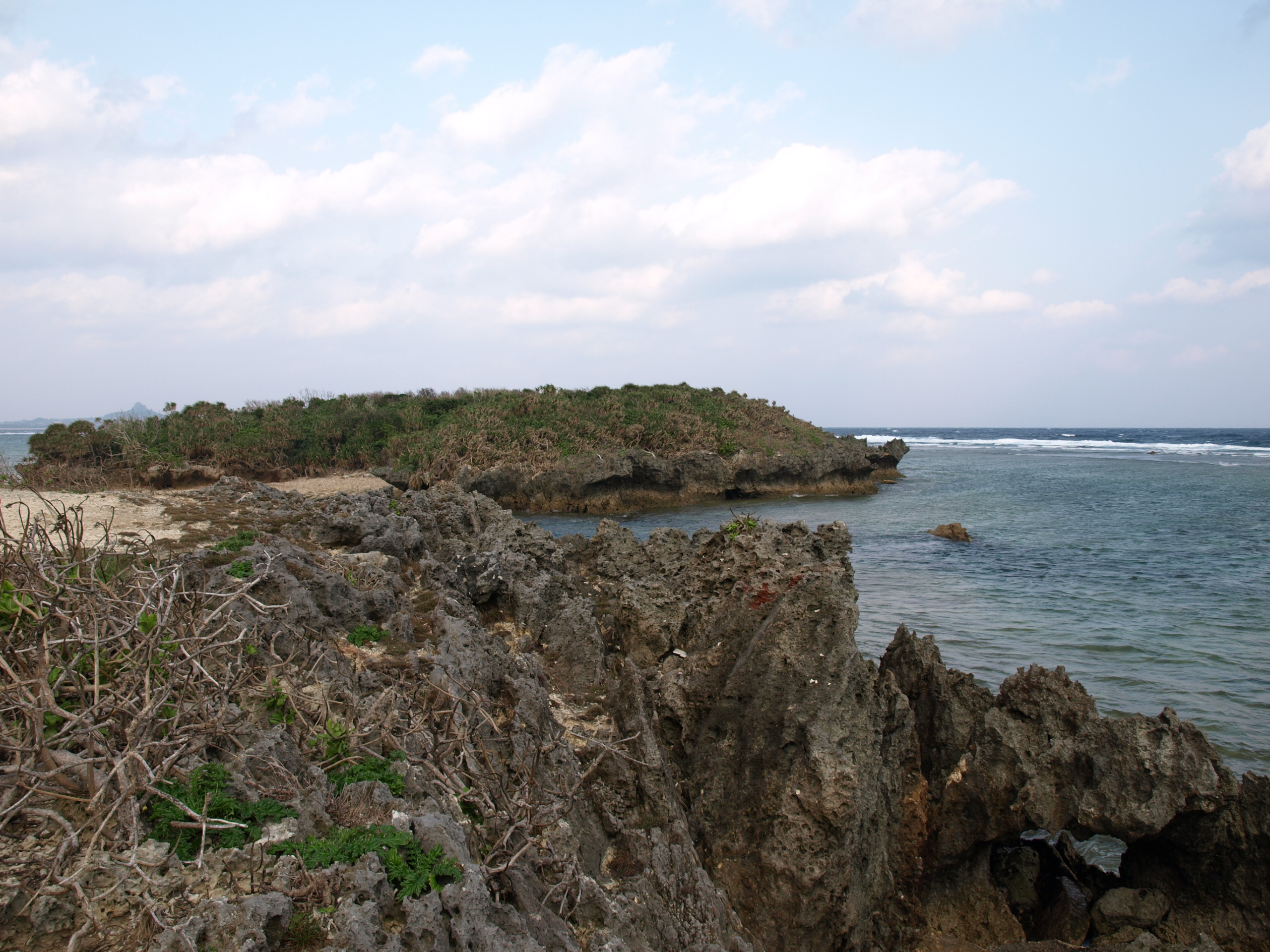
Cape Bise

Kanbun Uechi, the founder of Uechi-ryū, one of the primary karate styles of Okinawa, was from the Motobu Peninsula.

== Nearby islands ==
- Iejima (also "Ie Shima") is near the Motobu Peninsula. Notably, Ernie Pyle died, on Iejima
- Kōri-jima, which is connects to Yagaji Island by a bridge
- Minnajima
- Sesokojima, which is connected to Motobu Peninsula by a bridge
- Yagaji Island, which is connected to Motobu Peninsula by a bridge

== United States military operations ==
During the Battle of Okinawa, by April 10, 1945 the Motobu Peninsula had been mostly secured.

Motobu Airfield was located on Motobu Peninsula, but was decommissioned after 1945.

== Other peninsulas on Okinawa ==
- Chinen Peninsula
- Henoko Peninsula
- Katsuren Peninsula
- Yomitan Peninsula

== See also ==
- Eisa, a form of Okinawan dance
- Uechi-ryū, a style of karate founded by Kanbun Uechi
- Naval Base Okinawa
