= Okinawa (city) =

City in Okinawa Prefecture, Japan

Okinawa City 沖縄市 Uchinaa
- City
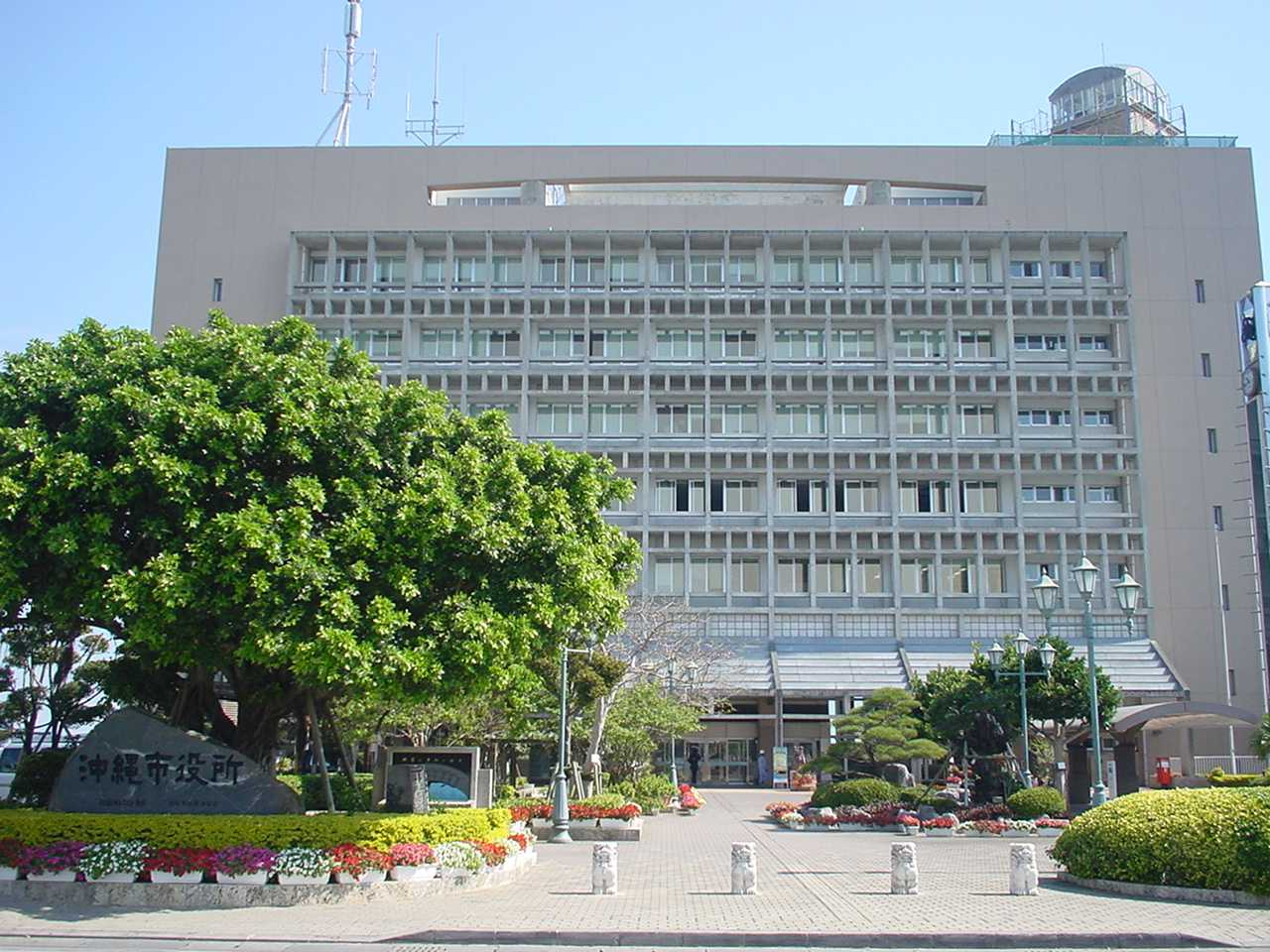
- Okinawa City Hall

- Flag Seal

- Location of Okinawa in Okinawa Prefecture

- Location within Japan
- Coordinates: 26°20′3″N 127°48′20″E
- Country: Japan
- Region: Kyushu
- Prefecture: Okinawa Prefecture
- First official recorded: 12th century (official estimated)
- Koza city settled: July 1, 1956
- Current city name changed: April 1, 1974

Government
  - Mayor: Daisuke Hanashiro (花城大輔) - from January 2026

Area
  - Total: 49.00 km^{2} (18.92 sq mi)

Population (October 1, 2020)
  - Total: 142,752
  - Density: 2,913.31/km^{2} (7,545.4/sq mi)
- Time zone: UTC+9 (Japan Standard Time)
- Tree: Chinese Fan Palm (Livistona chinensis)
- Flower: Hibiscus
- Phone number: 098-939-1212
- Address: 26-1 Nakasonechō, Okinawa-shi 904-8501
- Website: www.city.okinawa.okinawa.jp (in Japanese)

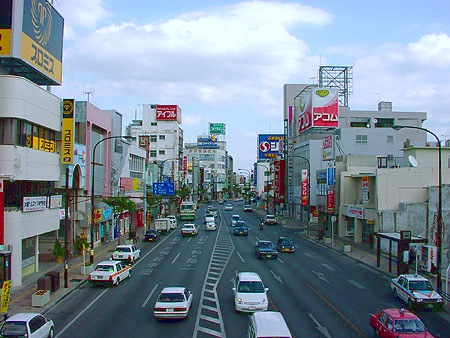
Okinawa City downtown

Okinawa City (沖縄市, Okinawa-shi; pronounced [ò̞.k̟ʲí.nä́.β̞ä́(.ɕì)]) is the second-largest city in Okinawa Prefecture, Japan, following Naha, the capital city. It is located in the central part of the island of Okinawa, about 20 kilometres (12 mi) north of Naha. As of 1 October 2020, the city has an estimated population of 142,752 and a population density of 2,913.31 people per km^{2}. The total area is 49.00 km^{2}.

== History ==
Under the Ryukyu Kingdom the present-day area of Okinawa City was occupied by two magiri, a type of administrative district. The Goeku magiri occupied the south of the city, and the north of the city was part of the Misato magiri.

In 1908, Okinawa Prefecture ended the magiri system and established the villages of Goeku and Misato. Both villages were agricultural and lacked urbanized areas prior to World War II.

After the Battle of Okinawa the United States established the first refugee camp in Okinawa in the area south of present-day Kadena Air Base. The population of the former villages swelled rapidly. An area of Goeku, called Goya (ごや), was mispronounced by Americans as Koza (コザ). During the occupation of Okinawa, the U.S. military government established the city of Koza (コザ市, Koza-shi) in Goeku. Koza was the first city to use the katakana syllabary for its name. Misato merged into a neighboring community, and in 1946, again became separate, as did Goeku. Both municipalities, which were formerly largely agricultural, became heavily urbanized as a result of the construction of refugee camps and the establishment of large-scale military bases. The area became a "base city" catering to United States military personnel. On June 13, 1956, Goeku changed its name to the village of Koza; on July 1 of the same year it became a city.

The city of Okinawa was the site of the Koza riot on the night of December 20, 1970. Roughly 5,000 Okinawans came into violent contact with roughly 700 American MPs. Approximately 60 Americans were injured and 75 cars were burned. Additionally, several buildings on Kadena Air Base were destroyed or heavily damaged. The Koza riot was considered a symbol of Okinawan anger after 25 years of US military occupation. The riot was unexpected, and strained the ongoing negotiations on the end of the United States administration of Okinawa.

The city of Okinawa was founded on April 1, 1974 with the merger of Koza and Misato.

== Geography ==
The commercial center of the city lies along Route 330. It extends from Goya Crossing to Koza Crossing. The district extending from Goya to the gate of Kadena Air Base, and Chūō Park Avenue, has many visitors from the U.S. military, and many shops have signs in both Japanese and English. However, the development of large shopping centers in nearby communities has resulted in some decline in these areas.

=== Administrative divisions ===
The city includes forty-six wards.

- Ageda (安慶田)
- Akemichi (明道)
- Awase (泡瀬)
- Chibana (知花)
- Chūō (中央)
- Dakujaku (大工廻)
- Goeku (越来)
- Goya (胡屋)
- Higashi (東)
- Hiyagon (比屋根)
- Ikehara (池原)
- Kaihō (海邦)
- Kaihōchō (海邦町)
- Kamara (嘉間良)
- Karagawa (嘉良川)
- Koja (古謝)
- Kojatsukazan (古謝津嘉山町)
- Kubota (久保田)
- Kuroshiki (倉敷)
- Matsumoto (松本)
- Mihara (美原)
- Minamitōbaru (南桃原)
- Misato (美里)
- Misatonakahara (美里仲原町)
- Miyazato (宮里)
- Morikawa (室川)
- Morine (森根)
- Moromizato (諸見里)
- Nakasone (仲宗根町)
- Noborikawa (登川)
- Odonshiki (御殿敷)
- Ōzato (大里)
- Shionomori (潮乃森)
- Shirakawa (白川)
- Shiromae (城前町)
- Sonda (園田)
- Sumiyoshi (住吉)
- Takahara (高原)
- Teruya (照屋)
- Tōbaru (桃原)
- Uechi (上地)
- Ukuda (宇久田)
- Yaeshima (八重島)
- Yamauchi (山内)
- Yamazato (山里)
- Yogi (与儀)

=== Neighboring municipalities ===
Neighboring municipalities consist of:

- Chatan
- Kadena
- Kitanakagusuku
- Onna
- Uruma
- Yomitan.

== Environmental problems ==
In June 2013 more than 20 barrels were found on an Okinawa city civilian soccer field built on former U.S. military land. Barrels revealed traces of herbicides and nearby water had levels of dioxins 840 times above safe limits.

== Parks and recreation ==
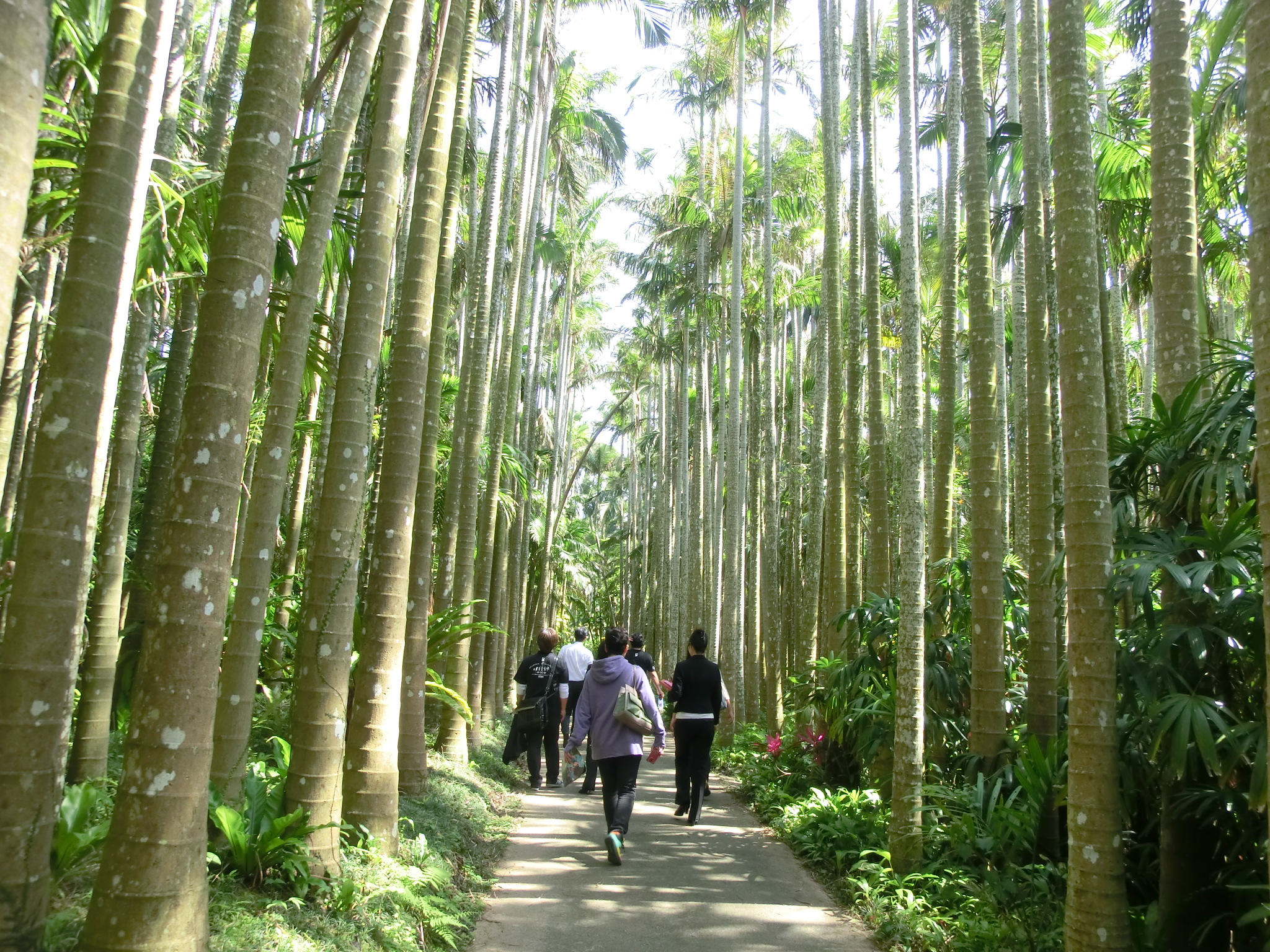
Path of Palm Trees, Southeast Botanical Gardens

A park in the southeastern portion of the city was the site of a National Sports Festival of Japan. Other city facilities include a baseball stadium where the Hiroshima Toyo Carp hold their spring training.

== Education ==
The city operates 15 elementary schools and eight middle schools. There is also a private elementary school. The five high schools are operated by Okinawa Prefectural Board of Education.

Department of Defense Education Activity (DoDEA) schools on Kadena Air Base, and in Okinawa City:

- Bob Hope Elementary School
- Kadena Elementary School
- Ralph F. Stearley Primary School
- Amelia Earhart Intermediate School
- Kadena Middle School
- Ryukyu Middle School
- Kadena High School

== Transportation ==
=== Roads ===
The Okinawa Expressway has two interchanges in the city. They are Okinawa North Number 5 and Okinawa South Number 4. The national highways passing through the city are Routes 329 and 330.

=== Bus lines ===
Ryūkyū, Okinawa, and Tōyō buses operate on some 26 routes in Okinawa.

== United States military installations ==
The United States has six installations located at least partially in the city of Okinawa. These are Kadena Air Base, Kadena Ammunition Storage Area, which lies on the boundaries with the town of Kadena and the village of Onna, Camp Shields, Camp Foster, Awase Communication Station, and an Army Petroleum product depot.

The Japan Ground Self-Defense Forces operate an anti-aircraft training facility.

== Sports ==
The city hosted some matches for 2023 FIBA Basketball World Cup sharing with Philippines and Indonesia at the Okinawa Arena.

== Notable people ==
Notable people with links to the city of Okinawa include:

- Gackt, singer-songwriter, actor
- Robert Griffin III, NFL Quarterback for the Washington Redskins-born in United States Army Base Okinawa, Okinawa
- Kenji Haga, singer
- High and Mighty Color, J-rock band
- Issa from hip-hop group Da Pump
- Shōkichi Kina, rock musician with Champloose
- Narito Namizato, basketball player
- Orange Range, band
- SPEED, J-POP band
- Tamlyn Tomita, actress and singer
- Yu Yamada, model-actress

== In popular media ==
- The Yokai King, an American television series was shot in 2013 in various locations in Okinawa City.
- The Karate Kid Part II (1986) is set in Okinawa, in a fishing village bordering Kadena Air Force Base, where Mr. Miyagi returns home after decades to tend to his dying father. Filming was actually done in Oahu, Hawaii, and Los Angeles, due to the modern build-up on Okinawa. The Okinawan village portrayed in the film was constructed on a private estate on the windward side of Oahu, where seven authentic replicas of Okinawan houses were constructed, along with more than three acres of planted crops. Fifty Okinawa-born Hawaii residents were also recruited as film extras.

== Points of interest ==
- Southeast Botanical Gardens

== Cultural Properties ==
Okinawa City hosts thirty designated or registered cultural properties and monuments, at the national, prefectural or municipal level.

- Name (Japanese) (Type of registration)

=== Cultural Properties ===
- Awase Bijuru Sacred Site (main shrine, torii gate, water sink) (泡瀬ビジュル(社殿、鳥居、手水鉢)) (Municipal)
- Nzatu Murayā (美里村屋) (National)
- Okinawa City Furusato-en: Former Hirata Family Residence (pig latrines) (沖縄市立ふるさと園 旧平田家マチフール) (National)
- Okinawa City Furusato-en: Former Kuba Family Residence (hinpun wall) (沖縄市立ふるさと園 旧久場家住宅ヒンプン) (National)
- Okinawa City Furusato-en: Former Kuba Family Residence (main house) (沖縄市立ふるさと園 旧久場家住宅主屋) (National)
- Sanshin, Hiranaka Chinen Type, inscribed Tokuke (三線平仲知念型銘時受) (Prefectural)
- Sanshin, Itogura Nagayonagusuku Type (三線糸蔵長与那城型) (Prefectural)
- Sanshin, Yonagusuku Type, inscribed Tamagusuku Yona (三線与那城型銘玉城與那) (三線与那城型銘玉城與那) (Prefectural)
- Survey stone of Akahirabaru ミ (ハル石 (印部石 ミ 赤ひら原)) (Municipal)
- Survey stone of Kinoshitabaru ア (ハル石 (印部石 ア 木の下原)) (Municipal)
- Survey stone of Sakubaru さ (ハル石 (印部石 さ さく原)) (Municipal)
- Uechi bamboo baskets (made by Yoshihira Chōhō) (上地のバーキ(與志平朝蒲制作竹細工)) (Municipal)

=== Folk Cultural Properties ===
- Bijuru sacred stones of Koja (古謝のビジュル) (Municipal)
- Chibana hanaori cloth: Cotton and banana thread navy blue base, warp kasuri, embroided hanaori costume (木綿芭蕉紺地経絣縫取花織衣裳) (Municipal)
- Chibana hanaori cloth: Cotton navy blue base, floating warp hanaori costume (木綿紺地経浮花織衣裳) (Municipal)
- Chibana hanaori cloth: Cotton navy blue base, warp and weft kasuri hanaori costume (木綿紺地経緯絣花織衣裳) (Municipal)
- Coffin palanquin of Misato (美里の龕) (Municipal)
- Ii-nu-tunu-mō meadows (上之殿毛) (Municipal)
- Village flag of Moromizato (諸見里の村旗) (Municipal)

=== Historic Sites ===
- Hījā-gā spring in Misato (美里のヒージャーガー) (Municipal)
- Hō-an-den (奉安殿) (Municipal)
- Kafunjā Bridge (カフンジャー橋) (Municipal)
- Monument to the Loyal Dead (忠魂碑) (Municipal)
- Murokawa Shell Mound (室川貝塚) (Municipal)
- Murukā-gā / Murugā spring (室川井) (Municipal)
- Noborikawa Stele (登川碑) (Municipal)
- Sēku-gā spring in Misato (美里のセークガー) (Municipal)
- Uni-Ufugusuku's Tomb (鬼大城の墓) (Municipal)

=== Places of scenic beauty ===
- Amamiku-nu-mui (Goeku Gusuku) (アマミクヌムイ (ごゑく=越来グスク)) (National)

=== Natural Monuments ===
- Sea fig of Koja Bijuru Sacred Site (古謝のビジュルにあるアコウ) (Municipal)

== Sister cities ==
Okinawa, Japan has the following sister cities, according to Sister Cities International and the city of Okinawa:

- Dili, Democratic Republic of Timor-Leste
- Lakewood, Washington, United States of America
