= List of highways numbered 58 =

The following highways are numbered 58:

== International ==
- European route E58

== Australia ==
- Riverina Highway

== Canada ==
- Alberta Highway 58
- Highway 58 (Ontario)
- Saskatchewan Highway 58

== Finland ==
- Finnish national road 58

== Greece ==
- EO58 road

== India ==
- National Highway 58, (NH 58)

== Iran ==
- Road 58

== Italy ==
- Autostrada A58

== Japan ==
- Japan National Route 58
- Okinawa Expressway
- Naha Airport Expressway

== Korea, South ==
- National Route 58

== New Zealand ==
- New Zealand State Highway 58

== Philippines ==
- N58 highway (Philippines)

== United Kingdom ==
- British A58 (Prescot-Wetherby)
- British M58 (Netherton-Orrel)

== United States ==
- U.S. Route 58
- Alabama State Route 58 (former)
  - County Route 58 (Lee County, Alabama)
- Arkansas Highway 58
  - Arkansas Highway 58E
- California State Route 58
- Colorado State Highway 58
- Connecticut Route 58
- Delaware Route 58
- Georgia State Route 58
- Hawaii Route 58
- Idaho State Highway 58
- Illinois Route 58
- Indiana State Road 58
- Iowa Highway 58
- K-58 (Kansas highway)
- Kentucky Route 58
- Louisiana Highway 58
- Maryland Route 58
- Massachusetts Route 58
- M-58 (Michigan highway)
- Minnesota State Highway 58
  - County Road 58 (Ramsey County, Minnesota)
- Missouri Route 58
- Nebraska Highway 58
- Nevada State Route 58 (former)
- New Jersey Route 58 (former)
- New Mexico State Road 58
- New York State Route 58
  - County Route 58 (Cattaraugus County, New York)
  - County Route 58 (Chautauqua County, New York)
  - County Route 58 (Clinton County, New York)
  - County Route 58 (Dutchess County, New York)
  - County Route 58 (Madison County, New York)
  - County Route 58 (Niagara County, New York)
  - County Route 58 (Otsego County, New York)
  - County Route 58 (Putnam County, New York)
  - County Route 58 (Rensselaer County, New York)
  - County Route 58 (Saratoga County, New York)
  - County Route 58 (St. Lawrence County, New York)
  - County Route 58 (Suffolk County, New York)
  - County Route 58 (Warren County, New York)
  - County Route 58 (Wyoming County, New York)
- North Carolina Highway 58
- North Dakota Highway 58
- Ohio State Route 58
- Oklahoma State Highway 58
  - Oklahoma State Highway 58A
- Oregon Route 58
- Pennsylvania Route 58
- South Carolina Highway 58
- Tennessee State Route 58
- Texas State Highway 58 (former)
  - Farm to Market Road 58
  - Texas State Highway Spur 58 (former)
  - Texas Park Road 58
- Utah State Route 58
- Vermont Route 58
- Virginia State Route 58 (1930-1933) (former)
- West Virginia Route 58
- Wisconsin Highway 58

== See also ==
- A58 (disambiguation)
- Route 58A

Preceded by 57	Lists of highways 58	Succeeded by 59
