= List of highways numbered 505 =

The following highways are numbered 505:

== Canada ==
- Alberta Highway 505
- Manitoba Provincial Road 505
- New Brunswick Route 505
- Ontario Highway 505 (former)

== Costa Rica ==
- National Route 505

== Israel ==
- Route 505 (Israel)

== Japan ==
- Japan National Route 505

== United Kingdom ==
- A505 road

== United States ==
- Interstate 505 (California)
  - Interstate 505 (Oregon; never built)
- Arizona State Route 505
- Florida State Road 505
- Louisiana Highway 505
- Maryland Route 505
- County Route 505 (New Jersey)
- New Mexico State Road 505
- Ohio State Route 505
- Pennsylvania Route 505
- Ranch to Market Road 505
- Washington State Route 505

Territories

- Puerto Rico Highway 505

Preceded by 504	Lists of highways 505	Succeeded by 506
