= Naha Airport Expressway =

Road in Okinawa Prefecture, Japan

Naha Airport Expressway
- 那覇空港自動車道
- The Naha Airport Expressway highlighted in red

Route information
- Length: 11.7 km (7.3 mi)
- Existed: 2000–present
- Component highways: National Route 506

Major junctions
- East end: Nishihara Junction in Nishihara; Okinawa Expressway
- National Route 507
- West end: Tomigusuku-Nakachi Interchange in Tomigusuku; National Route 331 / Okinawa Prefecture Route 256

Location
- Country: Japan

Highway system
- National highways of Japan; Expressways of Japan
← National Route 505	→ National Route 507

The Naha Airport Expressway (那覇空港自動車道, Naha Kūkō Jidōsha-dō) is an expressway on Okinawa Island in Okinawa Prefecture, Japan. The expressway has a length of 11.7 kilometres (7.3 mi). The Ministry of Land, Infrastructure, Transport and Tourism maintains most of the expressway, but the West Nippon Expressway Company is the owner and operator of a short section of the expressway at its eastern end. It is signed E58 as a spur route of the Okinawa Expressway under the "2016 Proposal for Realization of Expressway Numbering". It also carries the entire length of National Route 506.

== History ==
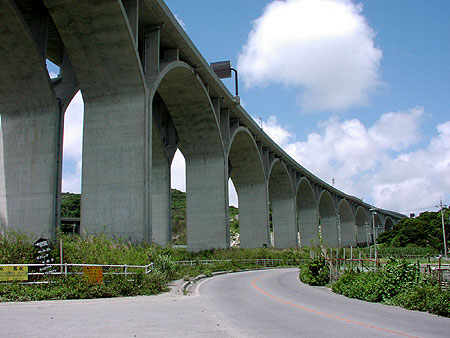
The Naha Airport Expressway in Haebaru

The Naha Airport Expressway first opened on 23 June 2000 between its eastern terminus at the junction with the Okinawa Expressway and Haebaru-minami Interchange. It was extended further west on 26 April 2003 from Haebaru-minami Interchange to Tomigusuku Interchange. It was extended to its current western terminus at Tomigusuku-Nakachi Interchange on 22 March 2008.

== Junction list ==
The entire expressway is in Okinawa Prefecture.

Location	km	mi	Exit	Name	Destinations	Notes
Nishihara	0	0.0	1-1	Nishihara	Okinawa Expressway	Eastern terminus; eastbound exit, westbound entrance
Haebaru	1.7	1.1	A1	Haebaru-kita	National Route 329 – Yonabaru, Naha	
Haebaru	5.9	3.7	A2	Haebaru-minami	National Route 507 / Okinawa Prefecture Route 82 – Yaese, Naha	
Tomigusuku	9.4	5.8	A3	Tomigusuku	Okinawa Prefecture Route 7 – Itoman, Naha	
Tomigusuku	12.1	7.5	A4	Tomigusuku-Nakachi	National Route 331 (Oroku Bypass) – Naha Airport, Naha; Okinawa Prefecture Route 68 – Nakachi	Western terminus; highway continues as the Oroku Bypass
1.000 mi = 1.609 km; 1.000 km = 0.621 mi: Incomplete access; Route transition
