= SR58 =

SR58 may refer to:

- SR58 (battery)
- SR58 (highway)
