= Ishikawa Tunnel =

Part of Japan National Route 329 in Uruma, Okinawa

National Route 329
- 国道329号
- 国道329号

Route information
- Length: 78.5 km (48.8 mi)

Major junctions
- From: National Route 331 in Nago
- To: National Route 331 in Naha

Location
- Country: Japan

Highway system
- National highways of Japan; Expressways of Japan

The Ishikawa Tunnel (石川トンネル, Ishikawa Tonneru) is part of Japan National Route 329 in Uruma, Okinawa. It cuts through the cliffs south of Ishikawa to connect the Ishikawa By-pass to Route 329 proper. The by-pass, tunnel, and bridge were built in the 1990s.

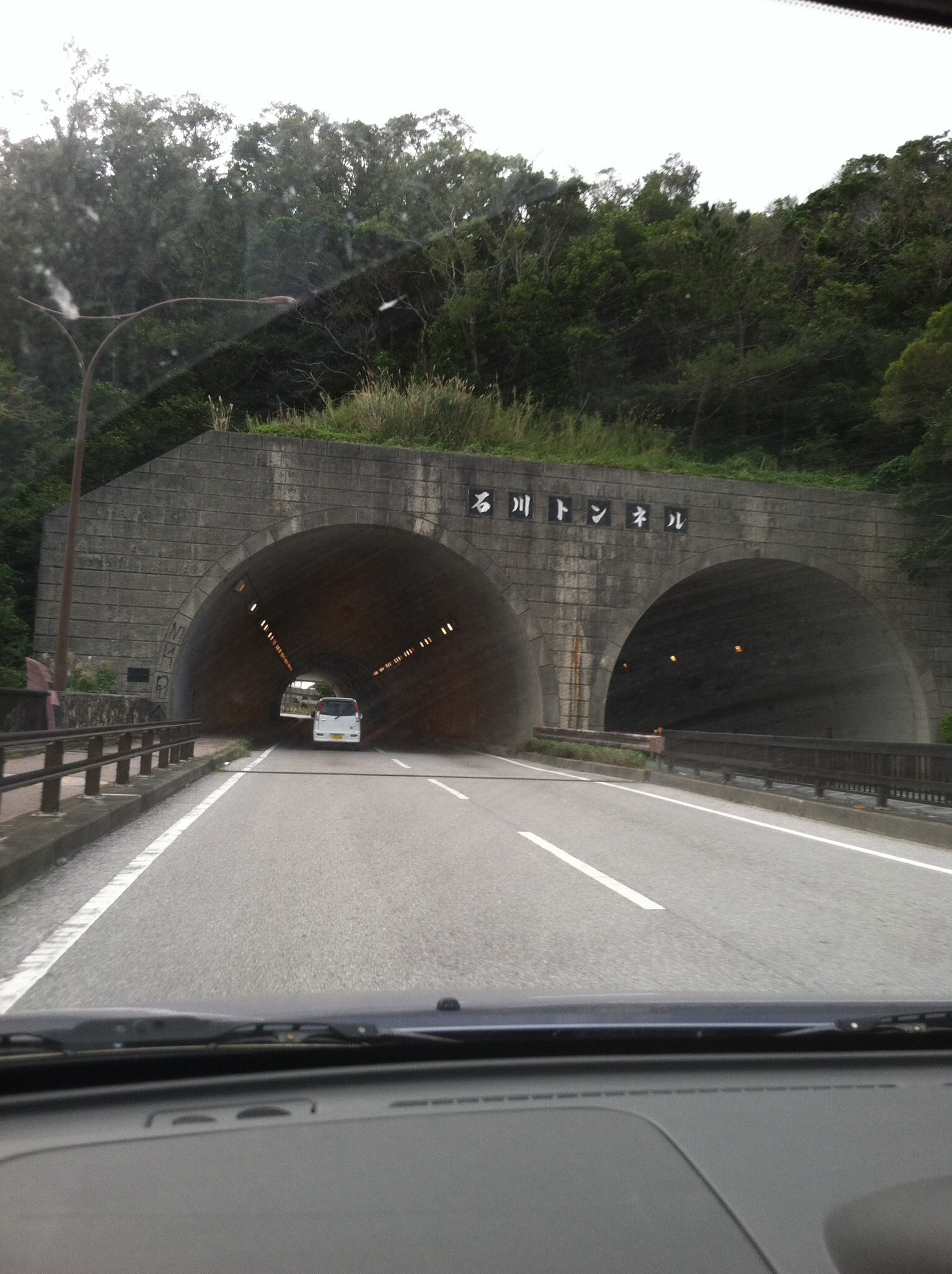
The Ishikawa Tunnel from the North entrance.
