= List of highways numbered 507 =

The following highways are numbered 507:

== Canada ==
- Alberta Highway 507
- Manitoba Provincial Road 507
- Ontario Highway 507 (former)

== Costa Rica ==
- National Route 507

== India ==
- National Highway 507 (India)

== Japan ==
- Japan National Route 507

== United Kingdom ==
- A507 road

== United States ==
- Florida State Road 507
  - Florida State Road 507 (pre-1945) (former)
- County Road 507 (Brevard County, Florida)
- Montana Secondary Highway 507
- County Route 507 (New Jersey)
- Ohio State Route 507
- Pennsylvania Route 507
- Puerto Rico Highway 507
- Washington State Route 507

Preceded by 506	Lists of highways 507	Succeeded by 508
