= Ishikawa By-pass =

Road in Okinawa, Japan

National Route 329
- 国道329号
- 国道329号

Route information
- Length: 78.5 km (48.8 mi)

Major junctions
- From: National Route 331 in Nago
- To: National Route 331 in Naha

Location
- Country: Japan

Highway system
- National highways of Japan; Expressways of Japan

The Ishikawa By-pass (石川バイパス, Ishikawa Baipasu) is part of Japan National Route 329 in Uruma, Okinawa. It goes through the cliffs south of Ishikawa via the Ishikawa Tunnel (石川トンネル) and a bridge, all built in the early 1990s.

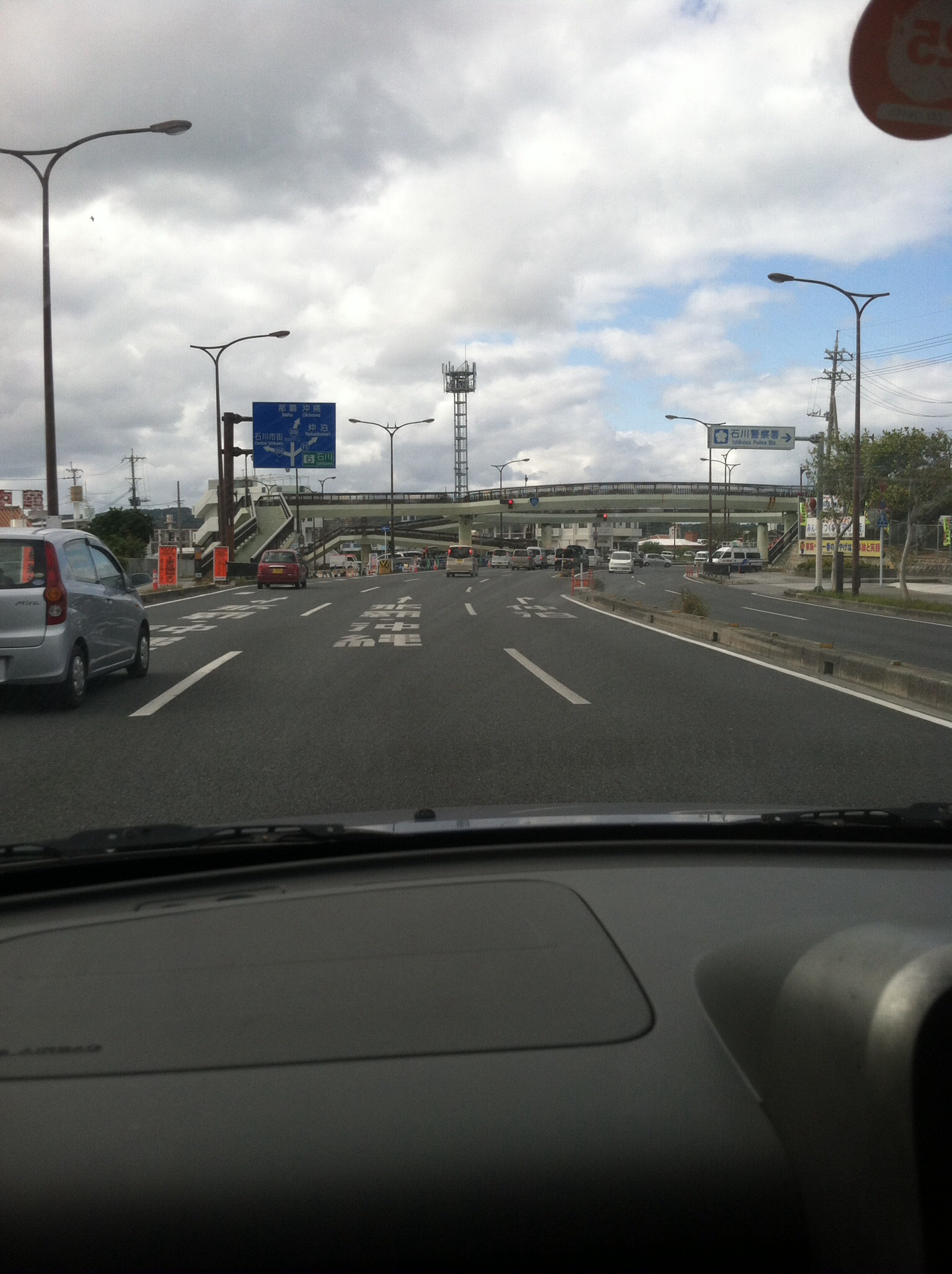
Intersection of the Ishikawa By-pass and Highway 329 in downtown Ishikawa.
