= List of highways numbered 504 =

The following highways are numbered 504:

== Costa Rica ==
- National Route 504

== Japan ==
- Japan National Route 504

== Russia ==
- R504 Kolyma Highway

== United States ==
States

- Mississippi Highway 504
- Pennsylvania Route 504

Territories

- Puerto Rico Highway 504

| Preceded by 503 | Lists of highways 504 | Succeeded by 505 |
