= Japan National Route 503 =

Road in Japan

National Route 503
- 国道503号

Route information
- Length: 112.7 km (70.0 mi)
- Existed: 1993; 32 years ago–present

Major junctions
- North end: National Route 265 / National Route 315 in Takamori, Kumamoto
- South end: National Route 10 in Hyūga, Miyazaki

Location
- Country: Japan

Highway system
- National highways of Japan; Expressways of Japan
| ← National Route 502 | → National Route 504 |

National Route 503 is a national highway of Japan connecting between Takamori, Kumamoto and Hyūga, Miyazaki in Japan, with total length has 112.7 km (70.0 mi).
