= Mount Yae =

Mountain in Japan

Coordinates: 26.6356°N 127.9283°E

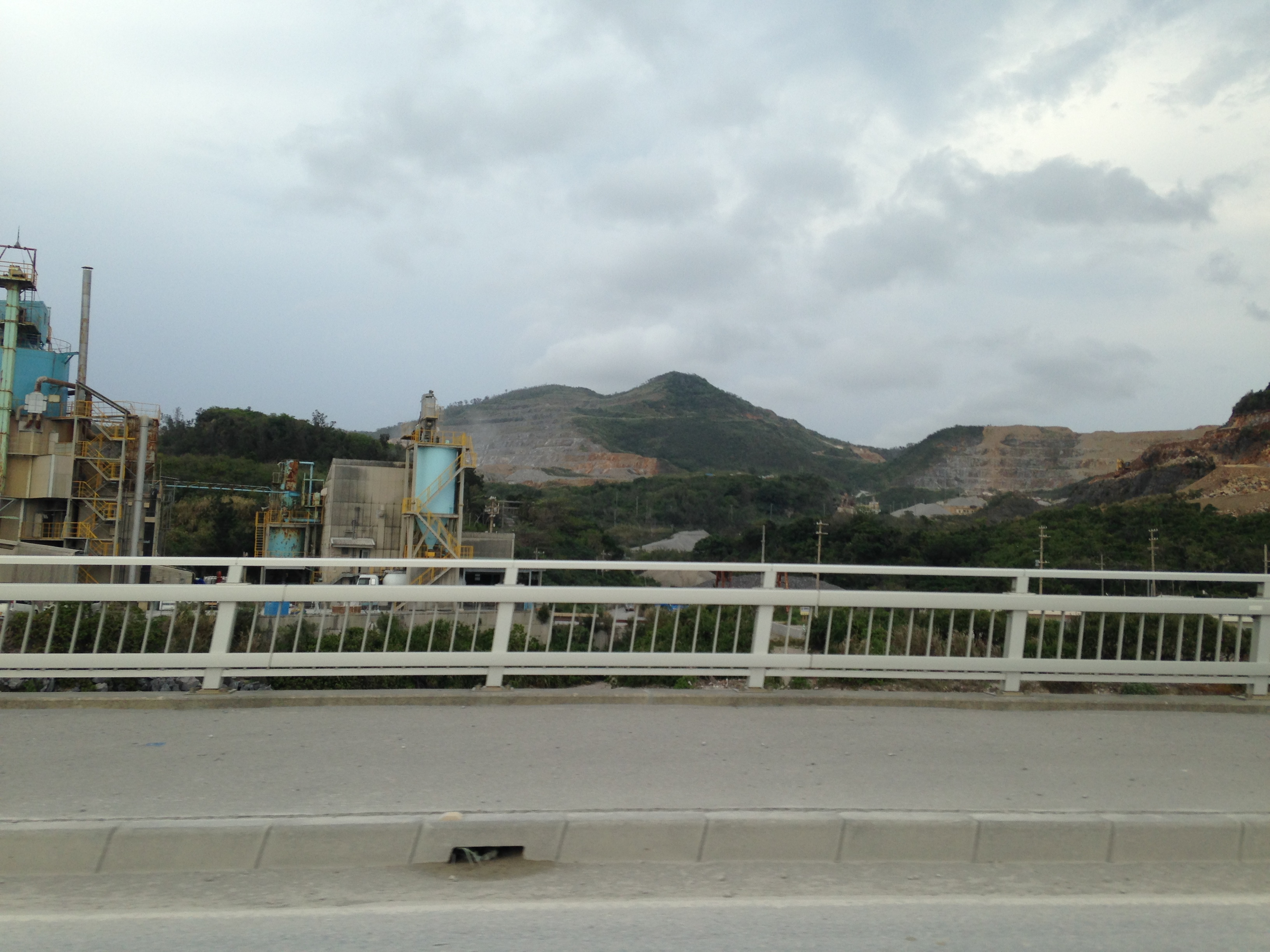
Mount Yaedake from Japan National Route 449 in Awa, Nago, Okinawa.

Mount Yae (八重岳, Yae-dake; Kunigami: Yē-dakī, Okinawan: Yē-daki), also known as Mount Yaedake or Yae-take, is a mountain in Motobu, Okinawa on Okinawa Island. It is the tallest mountain on the Motobu Peninsula, standing at 453.4 m (1,487 ft 6 1/2 in). Nakijin Castle and Nago Castle were built nearby in the 14th century. The mountain itself was used as a major Japanese defensive position during the Battle of Okinawa. Today it is famous for its annual Cherry Blossom Festival (桜祭り, Sakura Matsuri) held in March.
