= Route 58 (disambiguation) =

Route 58 may refer to:

- Route 58 (MTA Maryland), a bus route in Baltimore, Maryland and its suburbs
- London Buses route 58
- Melbourne tram route 58

== See also ==
- List of highways numbered 58
