= Japan National Route 330 =

Road in Okinawa prefecture, Japan

National Route 330
- 国道330号
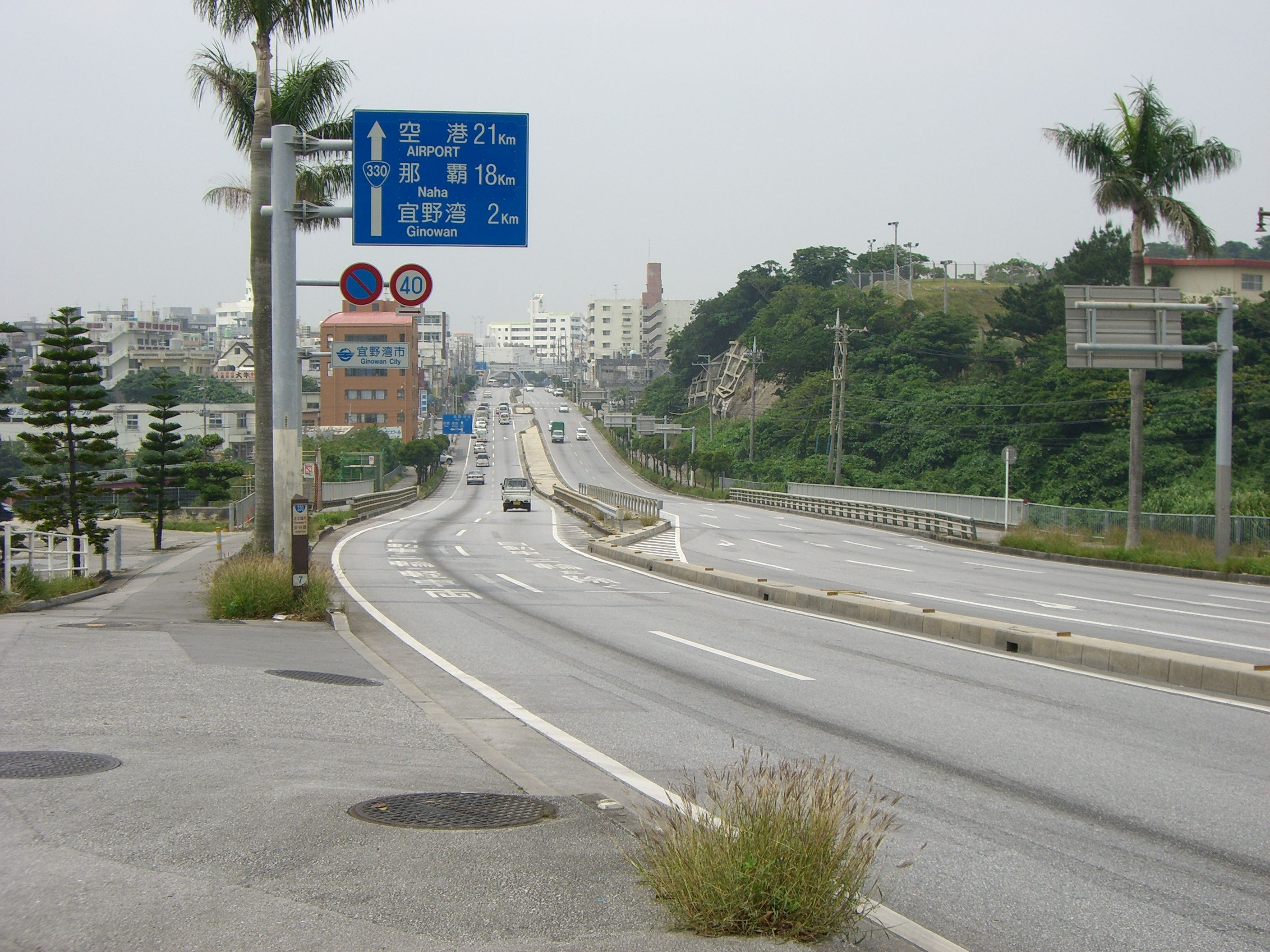

Route information
- Length: 26.1 km (16.2 mi)

Major junctions
- East end: National Route 329 in Okinawa, Okinawa
- Okinawa Expressway; National Route 507
- West end: National Route 58 / National Route 331 / National Route 390 in Naha, Okinawa

Location
- Country: Japan

Highway system
- National highways of Japan; Expressways of Japan
← National Route 329	→ National Route 331

National Route 330 is a national highway of Japan connecting Okinawa, Okinawa and Naha, Okinawa in Japan, with a total length of 26.1 km (16.22 mi).
