= List of highways numbered 508 =

The following highways are numbered 508:

== United Kingdom ==
- A508 road

== United States ==
- SR 508
- LA 508
- MD 508
- PR-508
- FM 508

Preceded by 507	Lists of highways 508	Succeeded by 509
