= Japan National Route 501 =

National highway in Japan

National Route 501
- 国道501号
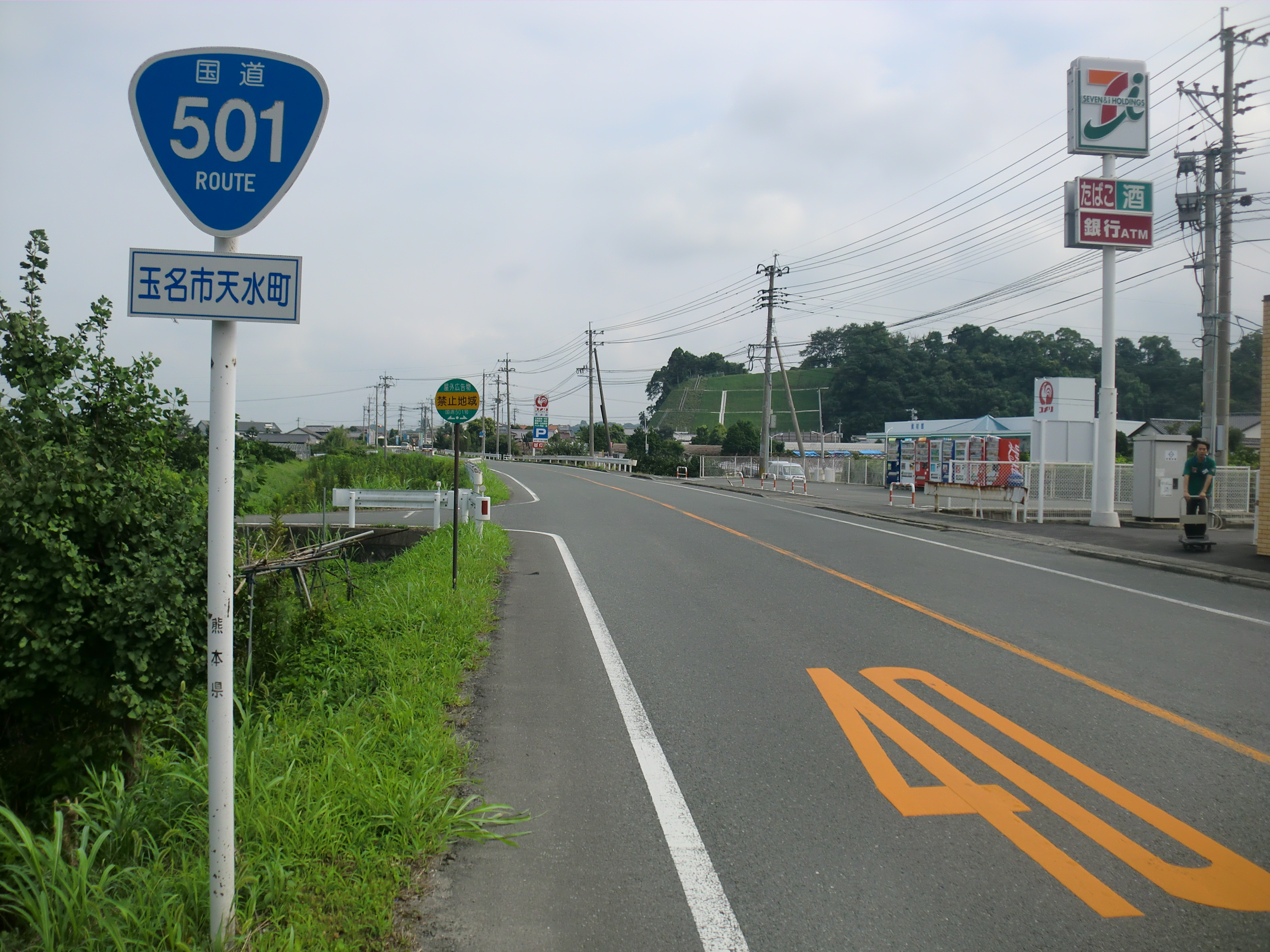

Route information
- Length: 47.1 km (29.3 mi)
- Existed: 1993–present

Major junctions
- North end: National Route 208 / National Route 209 in Omuta, Fukuoka
- South end: National Route 57 in Uto, Kumamoto

Location
- Country: Japan

Highway system
- National highways of Japan; Expressways of Japan
← National Route 500	→ National Route 502

National Route 501 is a national highway of Japan connecting between Omuta, Fukuoka and Uto, Kumamoto in Japan. The route has a total length of 47.1 km (29.3 mi).
