= Japan National Route 502 =

Road in Oita prefecture, Japan

National Route 502
- 国道502号

Route information
- Length: 53.3 km (33.1 mi)
- Existed: 1993–present

Major junctions
- West end: National Route 57 in Taketa, Ōita
- East end: National Route 217 in Usuki, Ōita

Location
- Country: Japan

Highway system
- National highways of Japan; Expressways of Japan
| ← National Route 501 | → National Route 503 |

National Route 502 (国道502号, Kokudō 502-gō) is a national highway between Usuki, Ōita and Taketa, Ōita in Japan. It has a total length of 53.3 km (33.1 mi).

== Route description ==
A section of National Route 502 in Taketa is a musical road.
