= Japan National Route 507 =

Road in Okinawa prefecture, Japan

National Route 507
- 国道507号
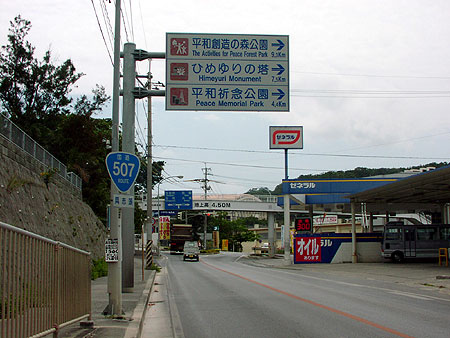

Route information
- Length: 26.5 km (16.5 mi)
- Existed: 1993–present

Major junctions
- South end: National Route 331 in Itoman, Okinawa
- National Route 329
- North end: National Route 330 in Naha, Okinawa

Location
- Country: Japan

Highway system
- National highways of Japan; Expressways of Japan
← National Route 506	→ National Route 1

National Route 507 is a national highway of Japan connecting Itoman and Naha on the island of Okinawa, with a total length of 26.5 km (16.46 mi).
