= List of highways numbered 506 =

The following highways are numbered 506:

== Costa Rica ==
- National Route 506

== United States ==
Maryland

- Maryland Route 506

Territories

- Puerto Rico Highway 506

Preceded by 505	Lists of highways 506	Succeeded by 507
