= Japan National Route 389 =

National highway in Japan

National Route 389
- 国道389号

Route information
- Length: 155.4 km (96.6 mi)

Location
- Country: Japan

Highway system
- National highways of Japan; Expressways of Japan
← National Route 388	→ National Route 390

National Route 389 is a national highway of Japan on the island of Kyushu, connecting Ōmuta, Fukuoka and Akune, Kagoshima in Japan, with a total length of 155.4 km (96.56 mi).
