= A58 =

A58 or A-58 may refer to:

- A58 road, a road connecting Prescot and Wetherby in England
- Autostrada A58, a bypass of Milano, Italy
- A58 motorway (Netherlands), a road connecting Eindhoven and Breda
- A-58 highway (Spain), a proposed road to connect Trujillo and the A5 and A66 in Spain
- Benko Gambit in chess (Encyclopaedia of Chess Openings code A58, among others)

== See also ==
- 58A
