= Japan National Route 448 =

Road in Japan

National Route 448
- 国道448号
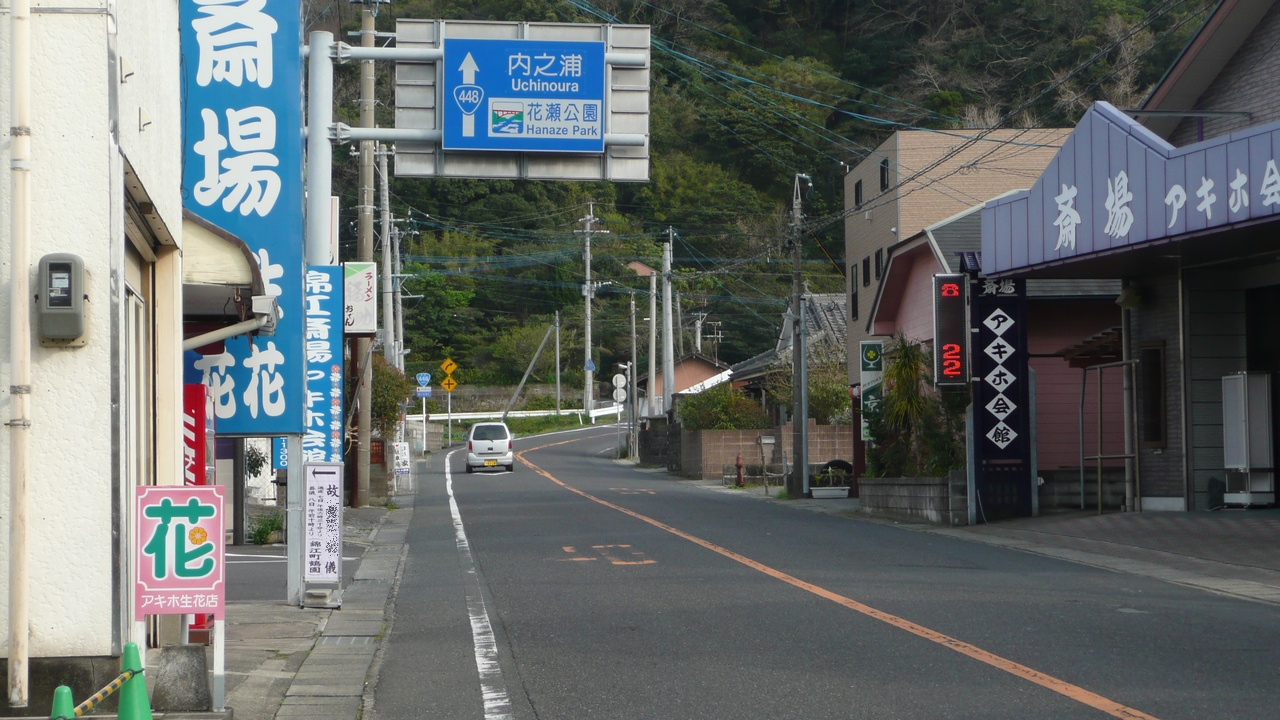

Route information
- Length: 231.1 km (143.6 mi)

Location
- Country: Japan

Highway system
- National highways of Japan; Expressways of Japan
← National Route 447	→ National Route 449

National Route 448 is a national highway of Japan connecting Ibusuki, Kagoshima and Miyazaki, Miyazaki in Japan, with a total length of 231.1 km (143.6 mi).
