= List of highways numbered 509 =

The following highways are numbered 509:

== Ireland ==
- R509 road (Ireland)

== United Kingdom ==
- A509 road (England)
- A509 road (Northern Ireland)

== United States ==
- SR 509 (former)
- LA 509
- MD 509
- PR-509
- FM 509
- SR 509

Preceded by 508	Lists of highways 509	Succeeded by 510
