= Toyo Bus =

Japanese bus company

Toyo Bus Co., Ltd. 東陽バス株式会社
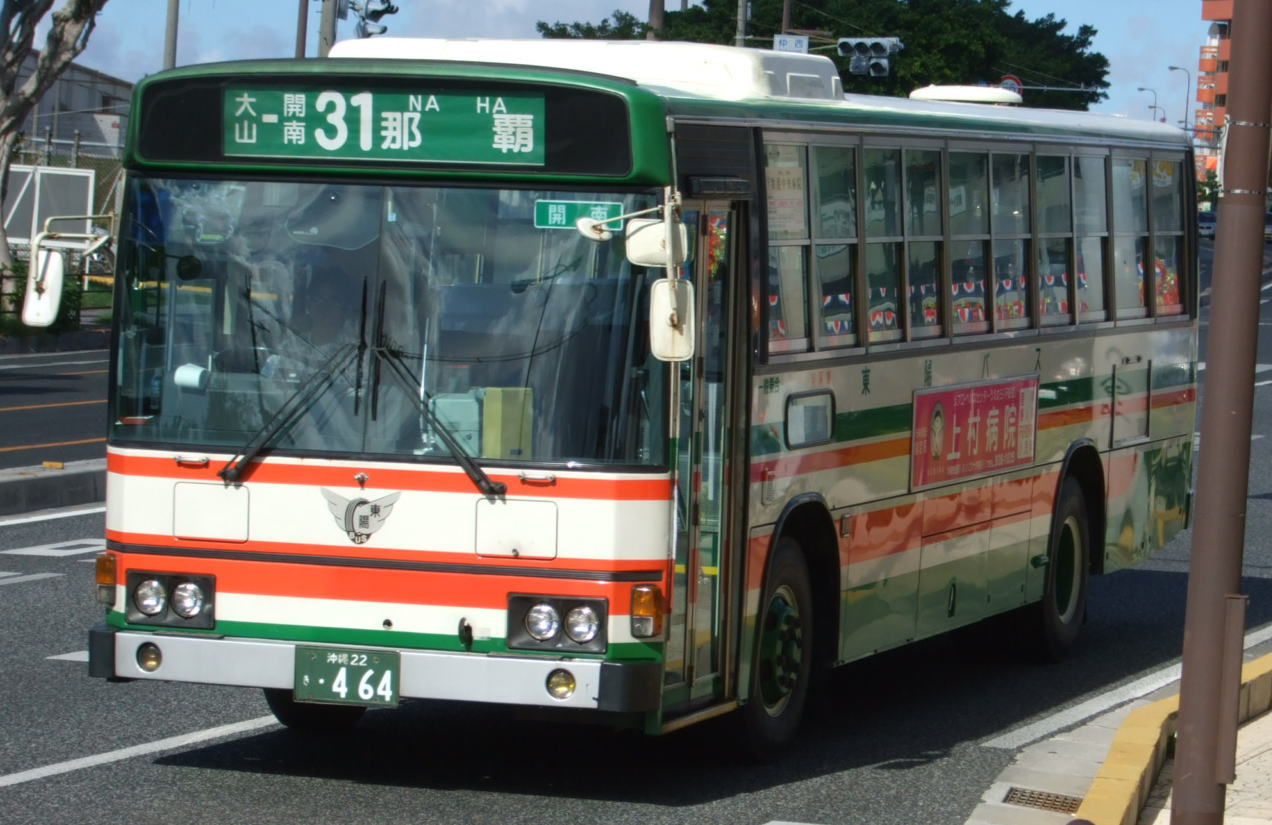
- Founded: May 18, 2012; 13 years ago
- Headquarters: Shinzato-545 Sashiki, Nanjō, Okinawa 901-1412, Japan
- Routes: Passenger division: 12; Tourism division: 3 (airport shuttles)
- Fleet: 140 vehicles (Passenger division: 88) (Tourism division: 52)

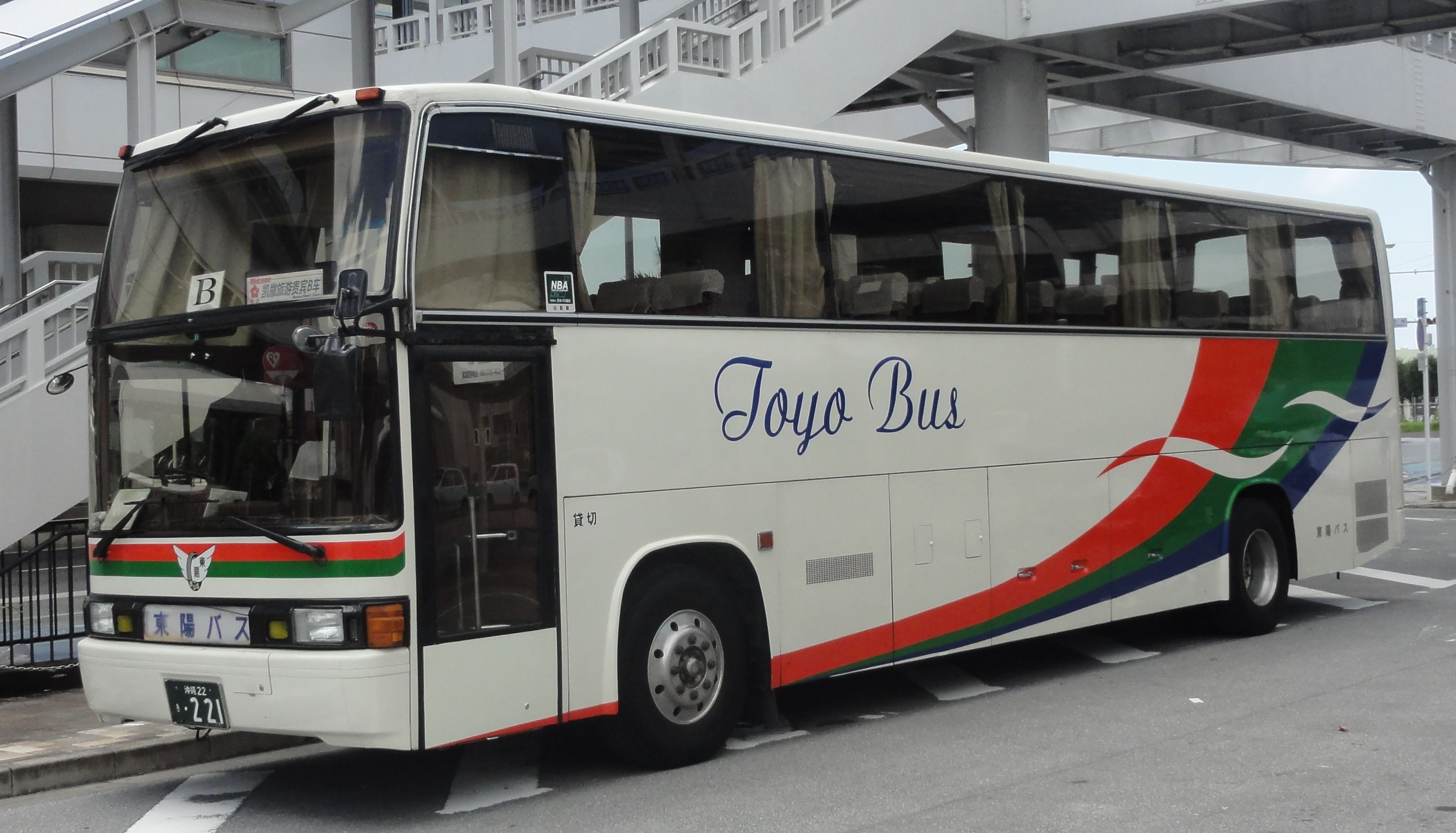
A Toyo Bus High Decker (ハイデッカー).

Toyo Bus Company (東陽バス株式会社, Tōyō basu Kabushikigaisha) is a bus company on Okinawa Island, established on May 18, 2012, and headquartered in Nanjō City. It primarily operates in South and Central Okinawa, and currently operates four bus models. The average cost is ¥220 for adults and ¥110 for children.

== See also ==
- Ryukyu Bus Kotsu
