= Japan National Route 315 =

Road in Yamaguchi prefecture, Japan

National Route 315
- 国道315号

Route information
- Length: 88.9 km (55.2 mi)

Location
- Country: Japan

Highway system
- National highways of Japan; Expressways of Japan
← National Route 314	→ National Route 316

National Route 315 is a national highway of Japan connecting Shūnan and Hagi in Yamaguchi prefecture, with a total length of 88.9 km (55.24 mi).
