= List of highways numbered 58A =

Route 58A may refer to routes in the following countries:

- Ontario Highway 58A
- Route 58A (Connecticut)
- National Route 58A, Madagascar

== See also ==
- Route 58
