= Japan National Route 332 =

Road in Okinawa prefecture, Japan

National Route 332
- 国道332号
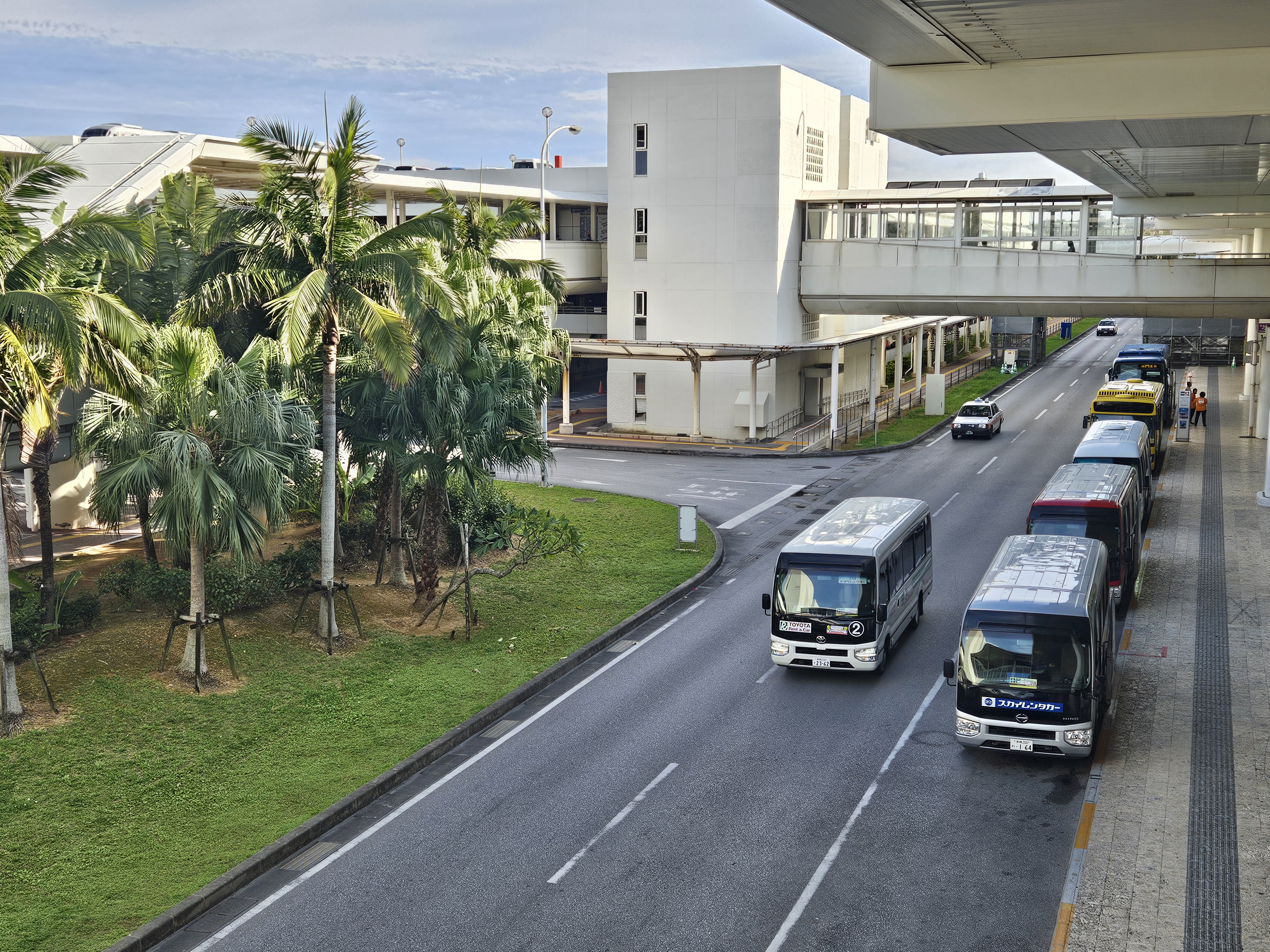

Route information
- Length: 3.1 km (1.9 mi)

Major junctions
- West end: Naha Airport
- East end: National Route 331 in Yamashita-cho, Naha, Okinawa

Location
- Country: Japan

Highway system
- National highways of Japan; Expressways of Japan
← National Route 331	→ National Route 333

National Route 332 is a national highway of Japan connecting Naha Airport and central Naha, Okinawa in Japan, with a total length of 3.1 km (1.93 mi).
