= Fukushūen =

Traditional Chinese garden in Naha, Okinawa

Coordinates: 26.21797°N 127.675943°E

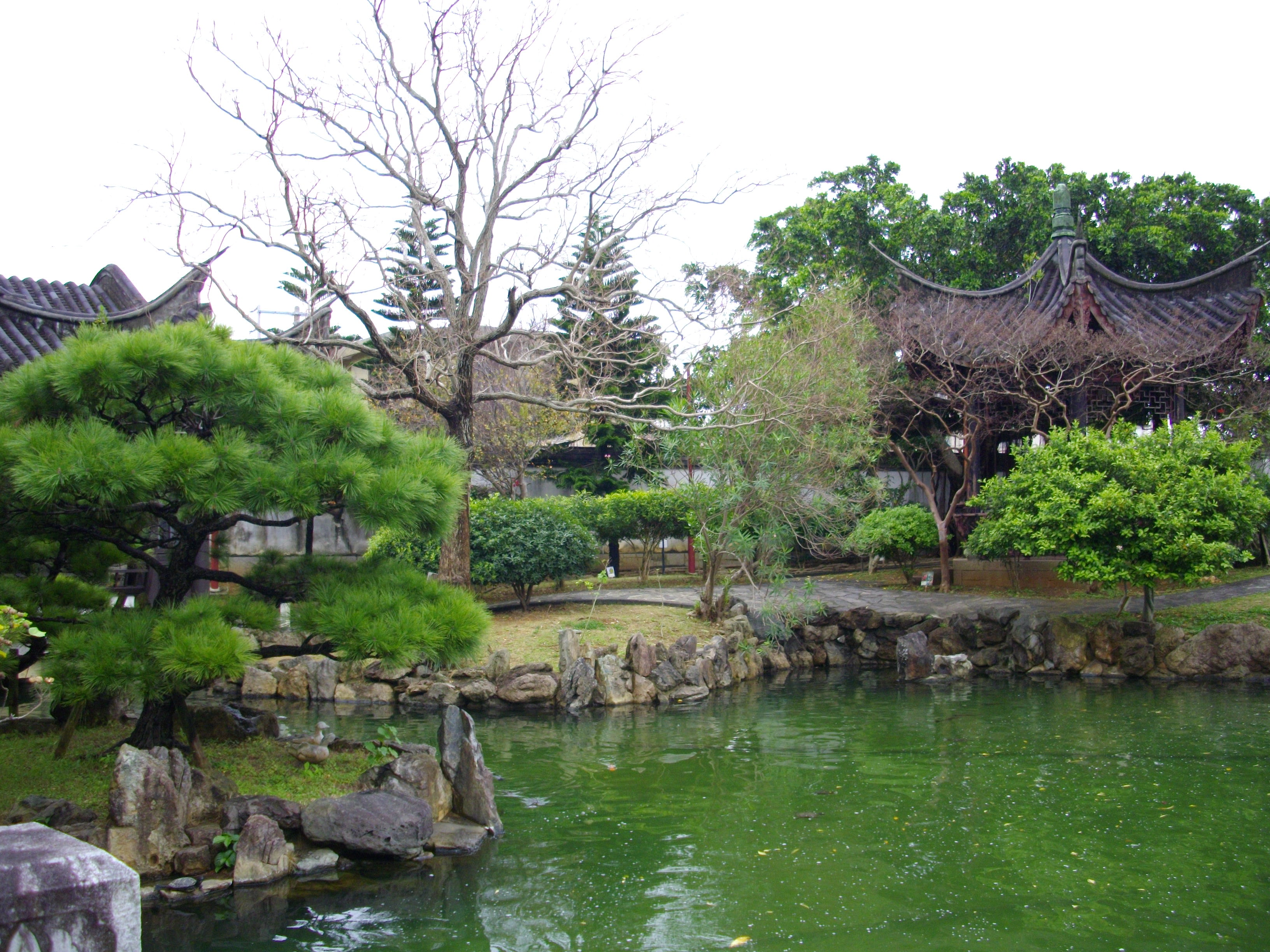

Fukushūen (福州園, lit. "Fuzhou Garden" or "Foochow Garden") is a traditional Chinese garden in the Kume area of Naha, Okinawa.

The garden was constructed in 1992, in celebration of the 10th anniversary of the establishment of the sister city relationship between Naha and Fuzhou in China. The Kume neighborhood where the garden is located, previously known as Kumemura (Kume Village), was for centuries the center of Chinese culture and learning in the Ryūkyū Kingdom, and a symbol of the significant role of Chinese cultural influence in Okinawan history and culture.

The garden was built nearly entirely with the use of wood and stone from Fuzhou, with the help of artisans from Fuzhou, and according to specifications representative of traditional gardens in Fuzhou. It thus contains many of the elements essential to the design of a traditional Chinese garden. It is walled, divided into individual sections, features much asymmetry, rocks including scholar's rocks, and water in the form of a single pond which extends into most sections of the garden. Several bridges in a variety of styles extend over the pond, which houses koi and turtles, a symbol of longevity and wisdom in Chinese culture. The centerpiece of the garden perhaps is its waterfall, located on the west side of the pond, directly facing the east entrance. The rock pile it flows from contains an artificial cave, and can be entered, and climbed; stairs cut into the rock lead to a Chinese-style pavilion, one of two high points in the garden allowing for a view of much of the garden, and the surrounding scenery.

The garden also has gates on the four cardinal directions, a number of six-sided pavilions, sculptures, bells, several inscriptions painted large on wood and stone, and in one building, a small exhibit of Chinese paintings and of a model of the style of ship that would have journeyed to Fuzhou during the time of the Ryūkyū Kingdom to bring tribute and to engage in trade. The Chinese and Japanese concept "borrowing of scenery ("shakkei")" (借景, C:jie jing, J:shakkei) is also used, adding to the sense of the garden's size. One element indicative of Okinawa, however, is seen in the plants and trees chosen for the garden. Trees such as Murraya paniculata, a relative of the orange and mikan, called gekkitsu (月橘) in Japanese, and Acacia confusa, called sōshiju (相思樹) in Japanese, both native to the Ryukyu Islands, Taiwan, and parts of Southeast Asia, were chosen for their aesthetic qualities, particularly for their flowers, which allow the garden's appearance and atmosphere to change with the seasons in a particular way appropriate for a traditional Chinese garden.

Access to the garden is open to the public; there is a small admission fee (adults 200¥, child 100¥). The garden is open from 9 AM to 6 PM and is closed on Wednesdays.

== Gallery ==
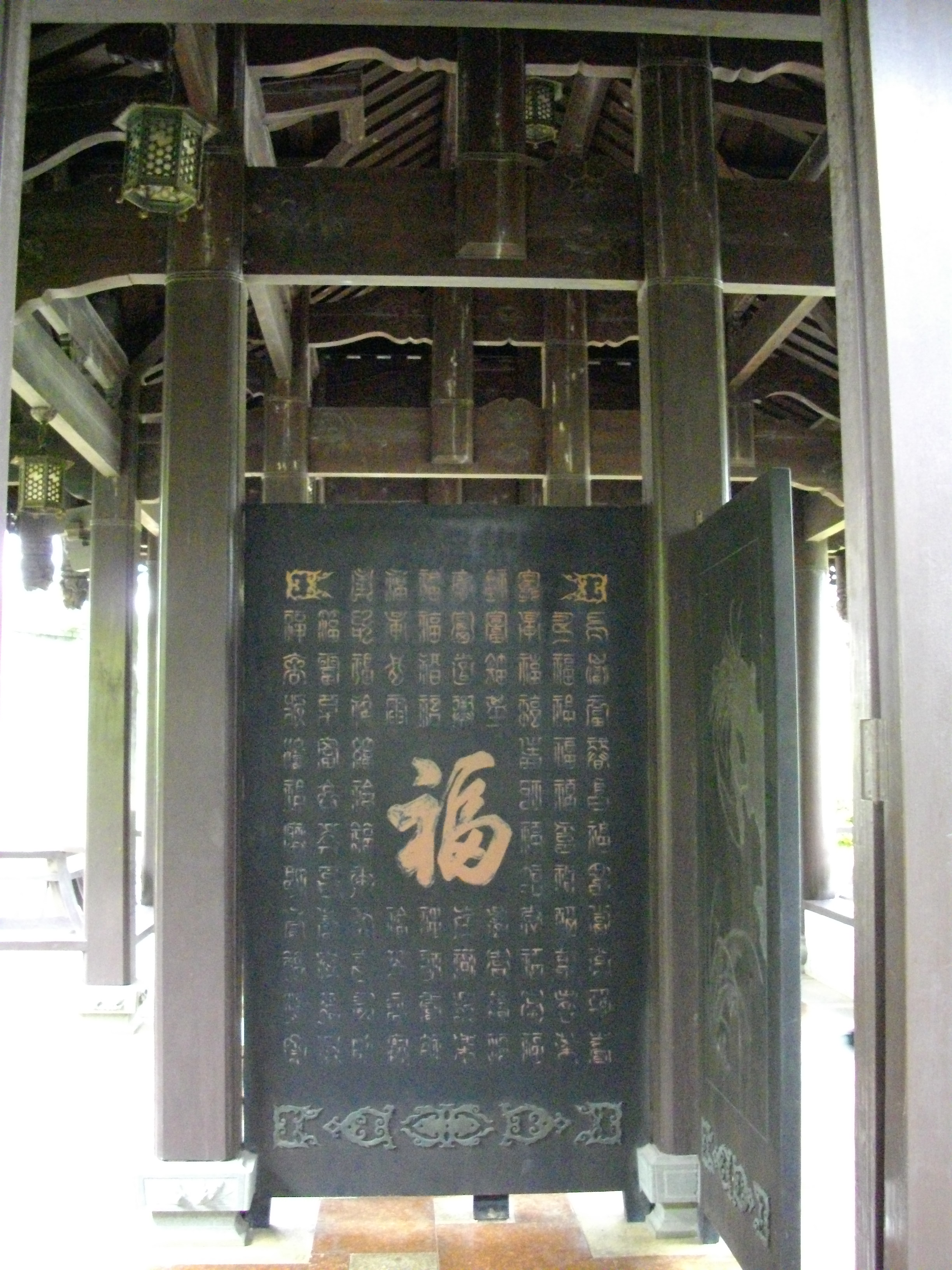

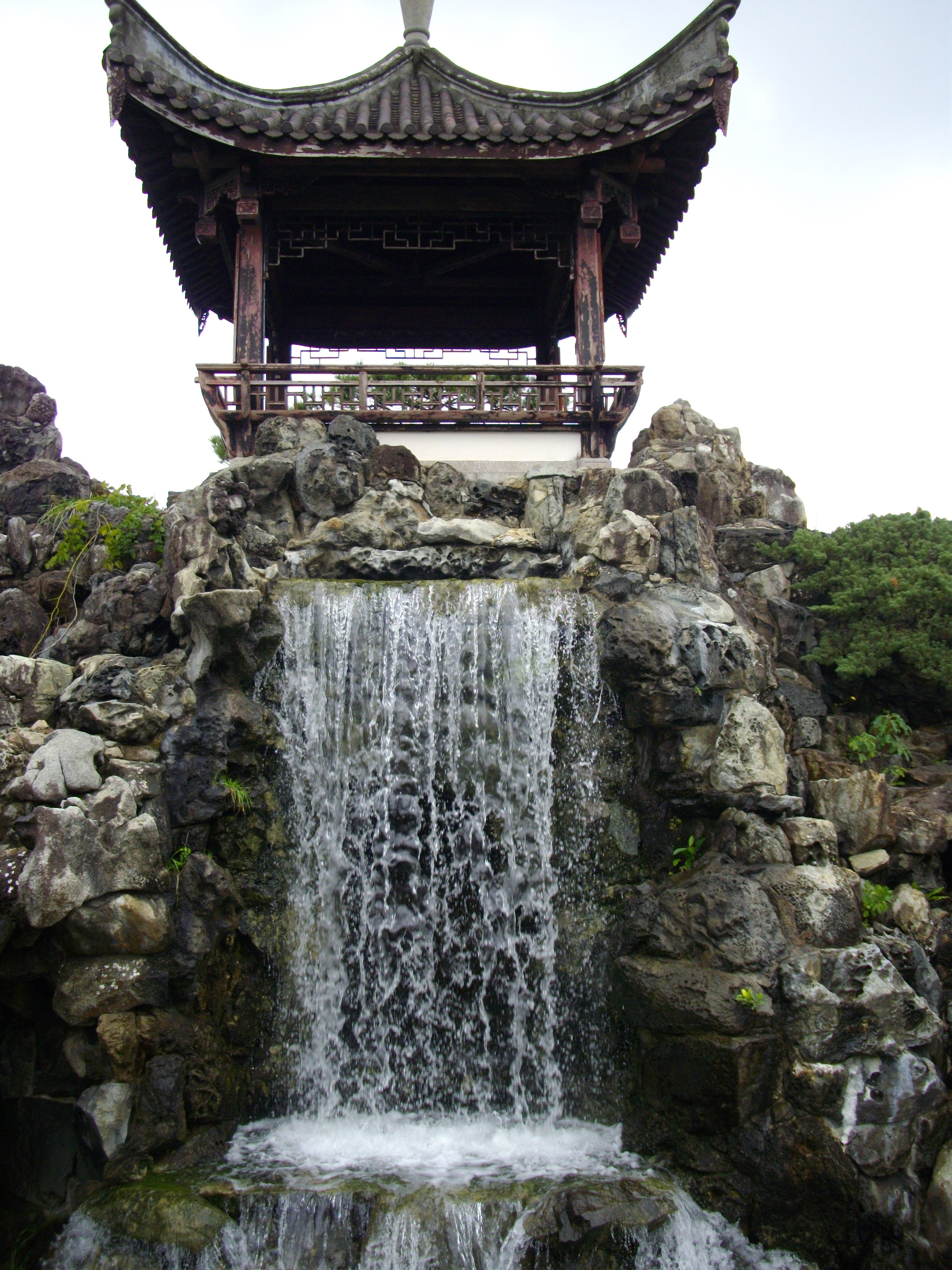

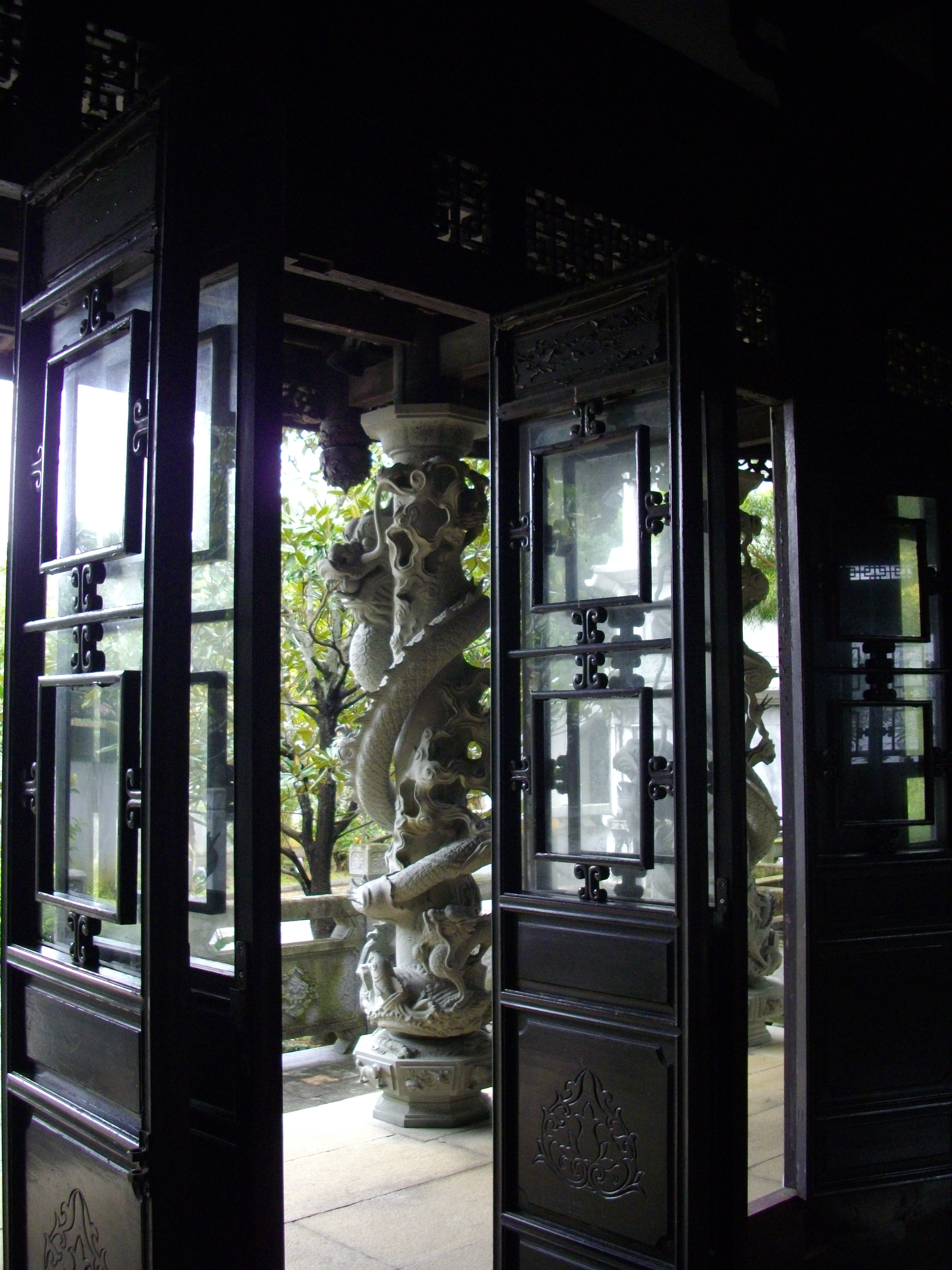
