= Japan National Route 504 =

Road in Kagoshima prefecture, Japan

National Route 504
- 国道504号
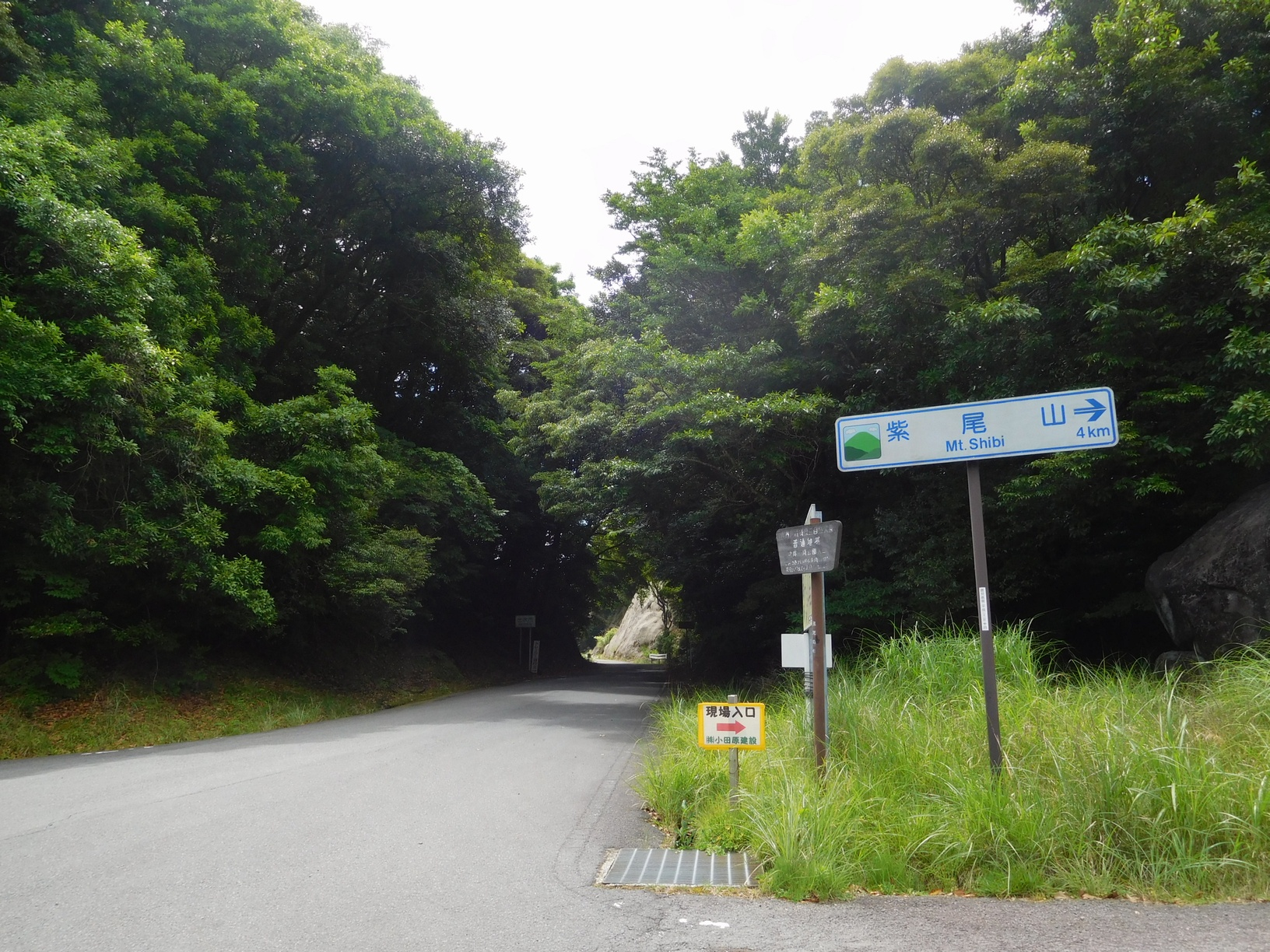

Route information
- Length: 145.1 km (90.2 mi)
- Existed: 1993–present

Major junctions
- North end: National Route 269 in Kanoya, Kagoshima
- South end: National Route 3 in Izumi, Kagoshima

Location
- Country: Japan

Highway system
- National highways of Japan; Expressways of Japan
← National Route 503	→ National Route 505

National Route 504 is a national highway of Japan connecting between Kanoya, Kagoshima and Izumi, Kagoshima in Japan, with total length has 145.1 km (90.2 mi).
