= Okinawa Expressway =

Expressway on Okinawa Island in Okinawa Prefecture, Japan

Okinawa Expressway
- 沖縄自動車道
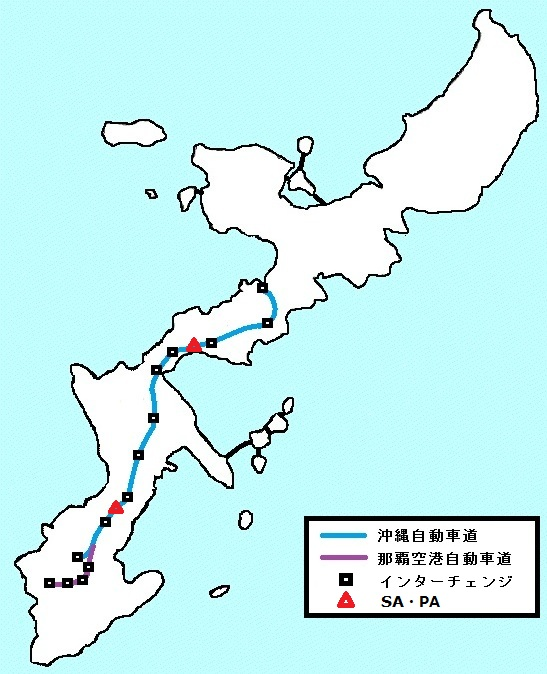

Route information
- Length: 57.3 km (35.6 mi)
- Existed: 1975–present

Major junctions
- From: Naha Interchange in Naha, Okinawa; Prefectural Route 82
- National Route 330; National Route 329; Naha Airport Expressway
- To: Kyoda Interchange in Nago, Okinawa; National Route 58

Location
- Country: Japan
- Major cities: Naha, Urasoe, Ginowan, Okinawa, Uruma

Highway system
- National highways of Japan; Expressways of Japan

The Okinawa Expressway (沖縄自動車道, Okinawa Jidōsha-dō) is an expressway on Okinawa Island in Okinawa Prefecture, Japan. The expressway has a length of 57.3 kilometers (35.6 mi). The West Nippon Expressway Company is the owner and operator of this expressway. It is signed E58 under the "2016 Proposal for Realization of Expressway Numbering".

== Route description ==
=== Tolls ===
The toll from end to end is 1020 yen for normal-sized cars and 840 yen for kei cars. For comparison, the Tōmei and Tōhoku Expressways radiating from Tokyo have tolls of about 1650 yen for similar distances.

=== Utilization ===
In 2002, an average of 23,910 vehicles per day used the expressway. This was a 5.6% increase from the previous year. This is the only expressway in Japan having more than 20% kei car traffic; the national average is 7.3%.

== Junction list ==
The entire expressway is in Okinawa Prefecture.

| Location | km | mi | Exit | Name | Destinations | Notes |
|---|---|---|---|---|---|---|
| Naha | 0 | 0.0 | 1 | Naha | Okinawa Prefecture Route 82 – to National Route 58, Naha Airport, Prefectural Office, Shuri Castle, Shuri | Southern terminus; partially signaled intersection |
| Nishihara | 2.4 | 1.5 | 1-1 | Nishihara | Naha Airport Expressway – Naha Airport, Haebaru-kita | Southbound exit, northbound entrance |
| Urasoe | 5.6 | 3.5 | 2 | Nishihara | National Route 330 – Nishihara, Urasoe | |
| Nakagusuku | 10.2 | 6.3 | PA | Nakagusuku Parking Area | | |
| Kitanakagusuku | 12.0 | 7.5 | 3 | Kitanakagusuku | Okinawa Prefecture Route 29 – Ginowan, Kitanakagusuku | |
| Kitanakagusuku | 13.4 | 8.3 | 3-1 | Kishaba | Okinawa Prefecture Route 81 | Southbound entrance only Access only for vehicles equipped with ETC |
| Okinawa | 17.8 | 11.1 | 4 | Okinawa-minami | Okinawa Prefecture Route 85 – Okinawa, Kadena, Chatan | |
| Okinawa | 22.9 | 14.2 | 5 | Okinawa-kita | National Route 329 – Nago, Ishikawa, Naha, Yonabaru; Okinawa Prefecture Route 36 east – Uruma | |
| Uruma | 31.4 | 19.5 | 6 | Ishikawa | Okinawa Prefecture Route 73 – to National Route 58, National Route 329, Nago, Kin, Nakadomari, Onna | |
| Kin | 34.1 | 21.2 | 7 | Yaka | Okinawa Prefecture Route 88 – Ishikawa, Nago | Southbound entrance, northbound exit |
| Kin | 36.7 | 22.8 | SA | Igei Service Area | | |
| Kin | 39.9 | 24.8 | 8 | Kin | National Route 329 – Kin, Yaka | |
| Ginoza | 48.1 | 29.9 | 9 | Ginoza | National Route 329 (Ginoza Bypass) – Ocean Expo Park (Okinawa Churaumi Aquarium), Nago, Okinawa, Uruma | |
| Nago | 57.3 | 35.6 | 10 | Kyoda | National Route 58 – Cape Busena, Inbu, Kyoda, Nago, Motobu | Northern terminus |
1.000 mi = 1.609 km; 1.000 km = 0.621 mi: Electronic toll collection; Incomplete access
