= Ryukyu Bus Kotsu =

Bus company of Okinawa Island, Japan

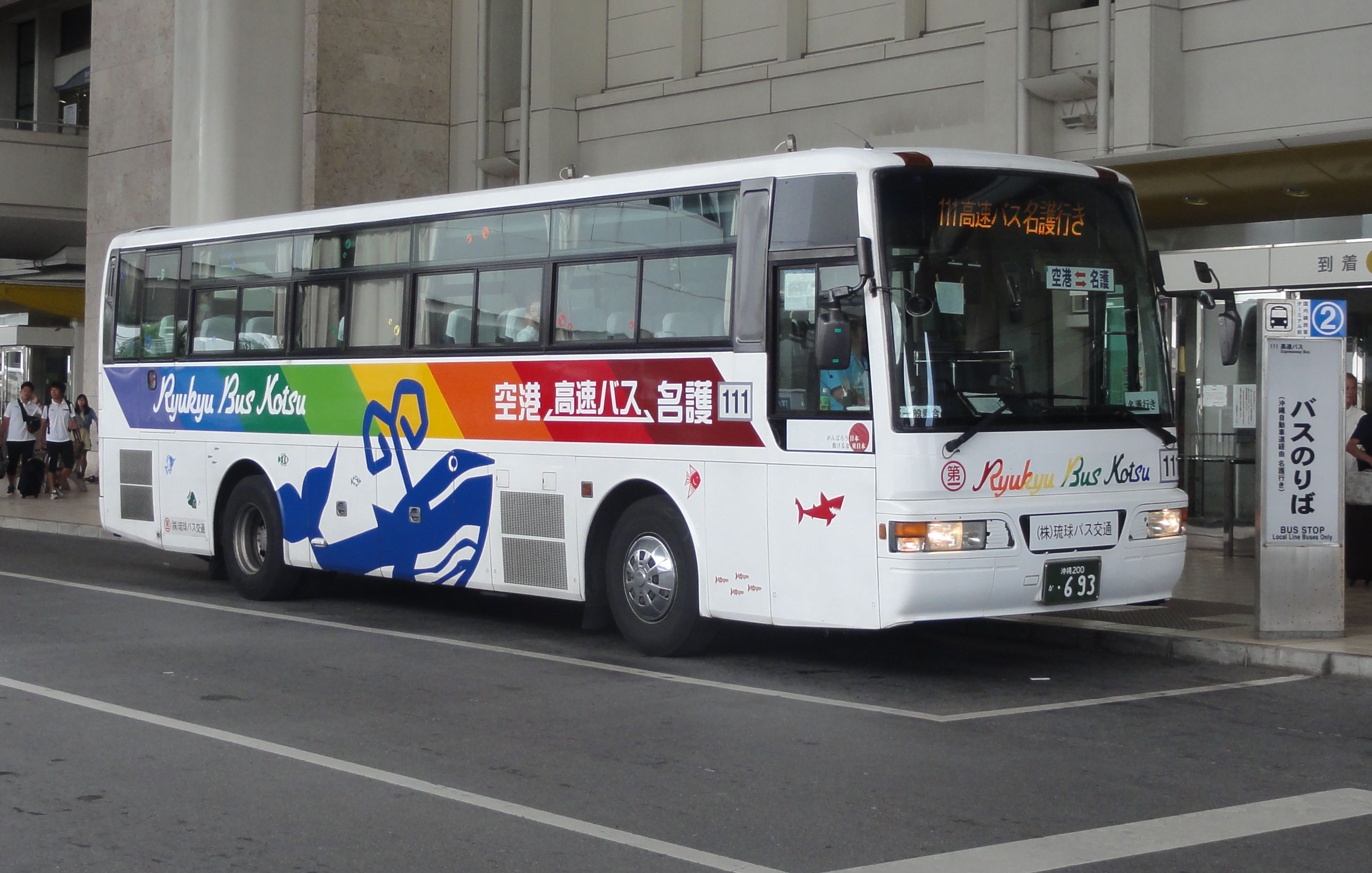
Ryukyu Bus Kotsu Motorcoach (大型).

Ryukyu Bus Kotsu (琉球バス交通, Ryūkyū basu kōtsū) is a bus company on Okinawa Island, established September 1, 2006, and headquartered in Tomigusuku City. They operate throughout the island, but primarily in the South and Central, and currently operate 6 bus models. The average cost is ¥220 for adults and ¥110 for children.

== See also ==
- Toyo Bus
