= Japan National Route 449 =

Road in Okinawa prefecture, Japan

National Route 449
- 国道449号

Route information
- Length: 20.3 km (12.6 mi)

Major junctions
- West end: National Route 505 in Motobu, Okinawa
- East end: National Route 58 in Nago, Okinawa

Location
- Country: Japan

Highway system
- National highways of Japan; Expressways of Japan
← National Route 448	→ National Route 450

National Route 449 is a national highway of Japan connecting Motobu, Okinawa and Nago, Okinawa in Japan, with a total length of 20.3 km (12.61 mi).
