= Japan National Route 505 =

National highway in Japan

National Route 505
- 国道505号

Route information
- Length: 21.1 km (13.1 mi)
- Existed: 1993–present

Major junctions
- West end: National Route 449 in Motobu, Okinawa
- East end: National Route 58 in Nago, Okinawa

Location
- Country: Japan

Highway system
- National highways of Japan; Expressways of Japan
← National Route 504	→ National Route 506

National Route 505 is a national highway of Japan. The highway connects Motobu, Okinawa and Nago, Okinawa. It has a total length of 21.1 kilometres (13.1 mi).
