= Japan National Route 390 =

Road in Okinawa prefecture, Japan

National Route 390
- 国道390号
- Japan National Route 390 highlighted in red
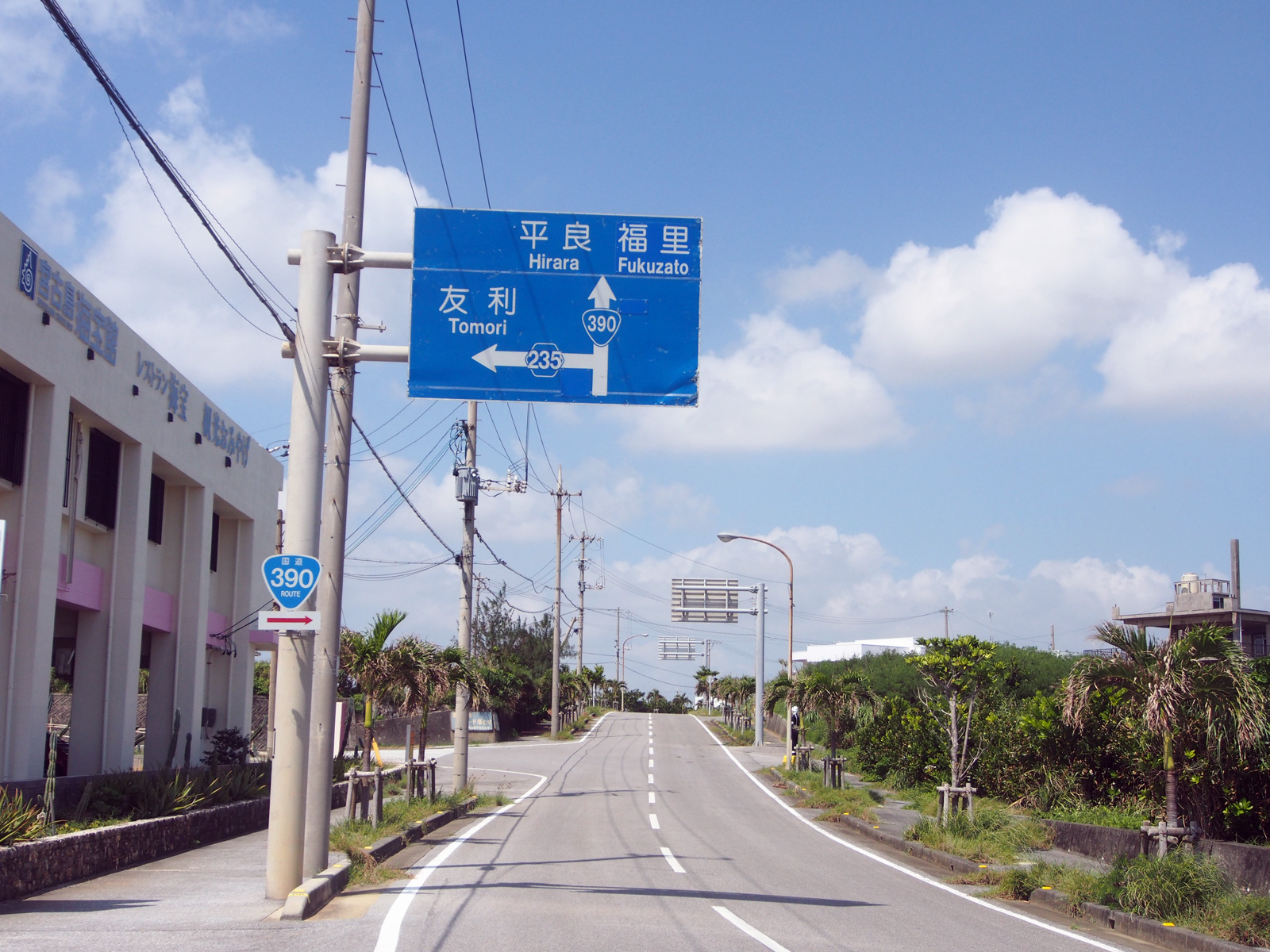

Route information
- Length: 58.2 km (36.2 mi)

Location
- Country: Japan

Highway system
- National highways of Japan; Expressways of Japan
← National Route 389	→ National Route 391

National Route 390 (国道390号, Kokudō Sanbyaku kyu-jū-gō) is both the southernmost and westernmost of the national highways of Japan. It connects Ishigaki, Okinawa on Ishigaki Island, to Miyako-jima, and Naha on Okinawa Island in Japan. Spanning the three islands by ferry, the highway has a total length of 58.2 kilometers (36.2 mi) on land and 552.2 kilometers (343.1 mi) when maritime distance is added.

== Route description ==
National Route 390 features the 730 Intersection in Ishigaki, a monument to the day when traffic in Okinawa Prefecture was reverted from driving on the right-hand side of the road to the left after the United States relinquished control over the prefecture to Japan following the 1971 Okinawa Reversion Agreement.
