= Japan National Route 329 =

National highway in Japan

National Route 329
- 国道329号
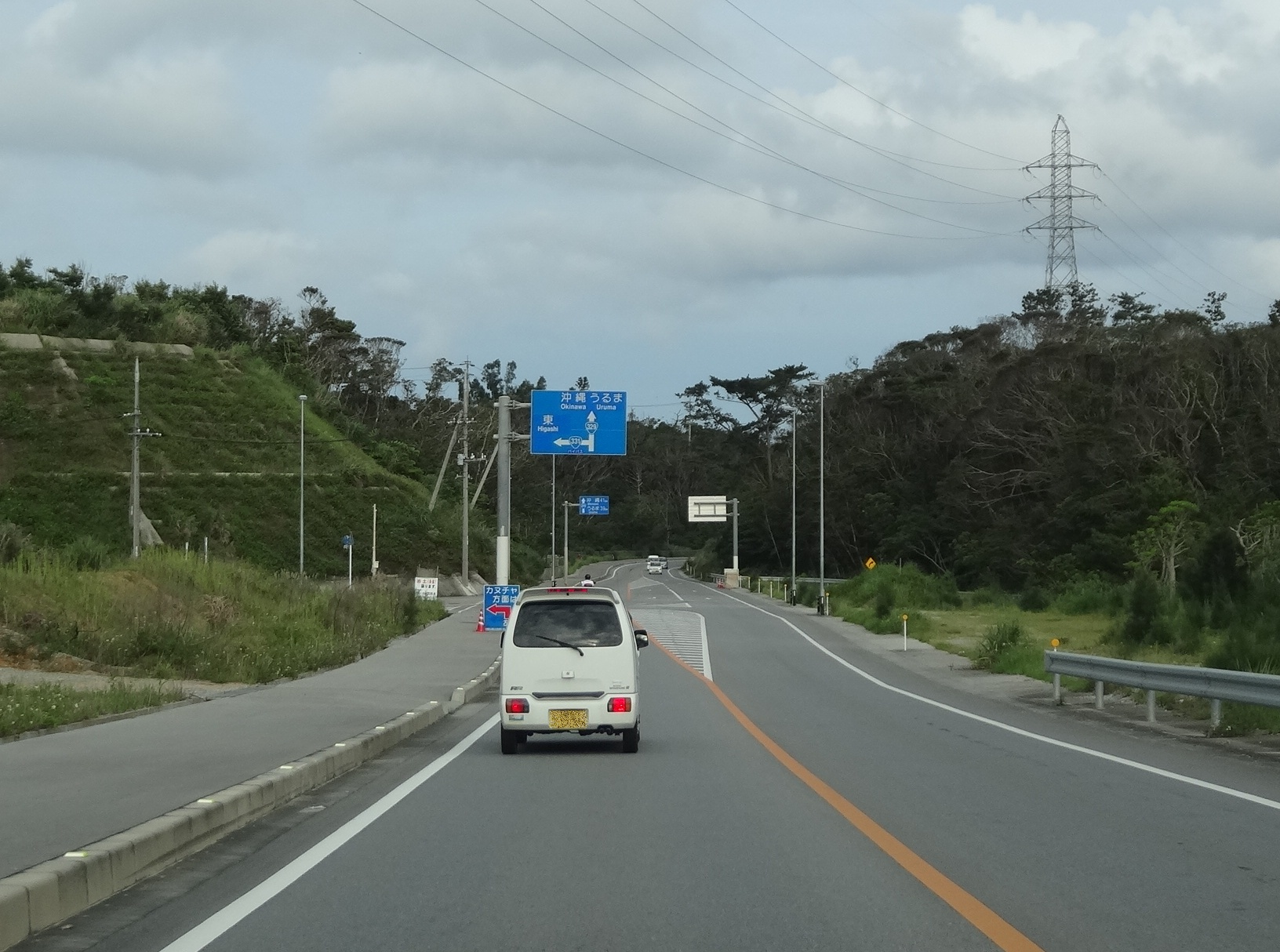

Route information
- Length: 78.5 km (48.8 mi)

Major junctions
- From: National Route 331 in Nago
- To: National Route 331 in Naha

Location
- Country: Japan

Highway system
- National highways of Japan; Expressways of Japan
← National Route 328	→ National Route 330

National Route 329 is a national highway of Japan connecting Nago, Okinawa, and Naha, Okinawa, in Japan, with a total length of 78.5 km (48.78 mi). The highway forks in Higashionna where the old 329 goes around the cliffs and the Ishikawa By-pass goes through the cliffs via the Ishikawa Tunnel (石川トンネル) and a bridge, all built in the early 1990s.
