= Japan National Route 331 =

National highway in Japan

National Route 331
- 国道331号
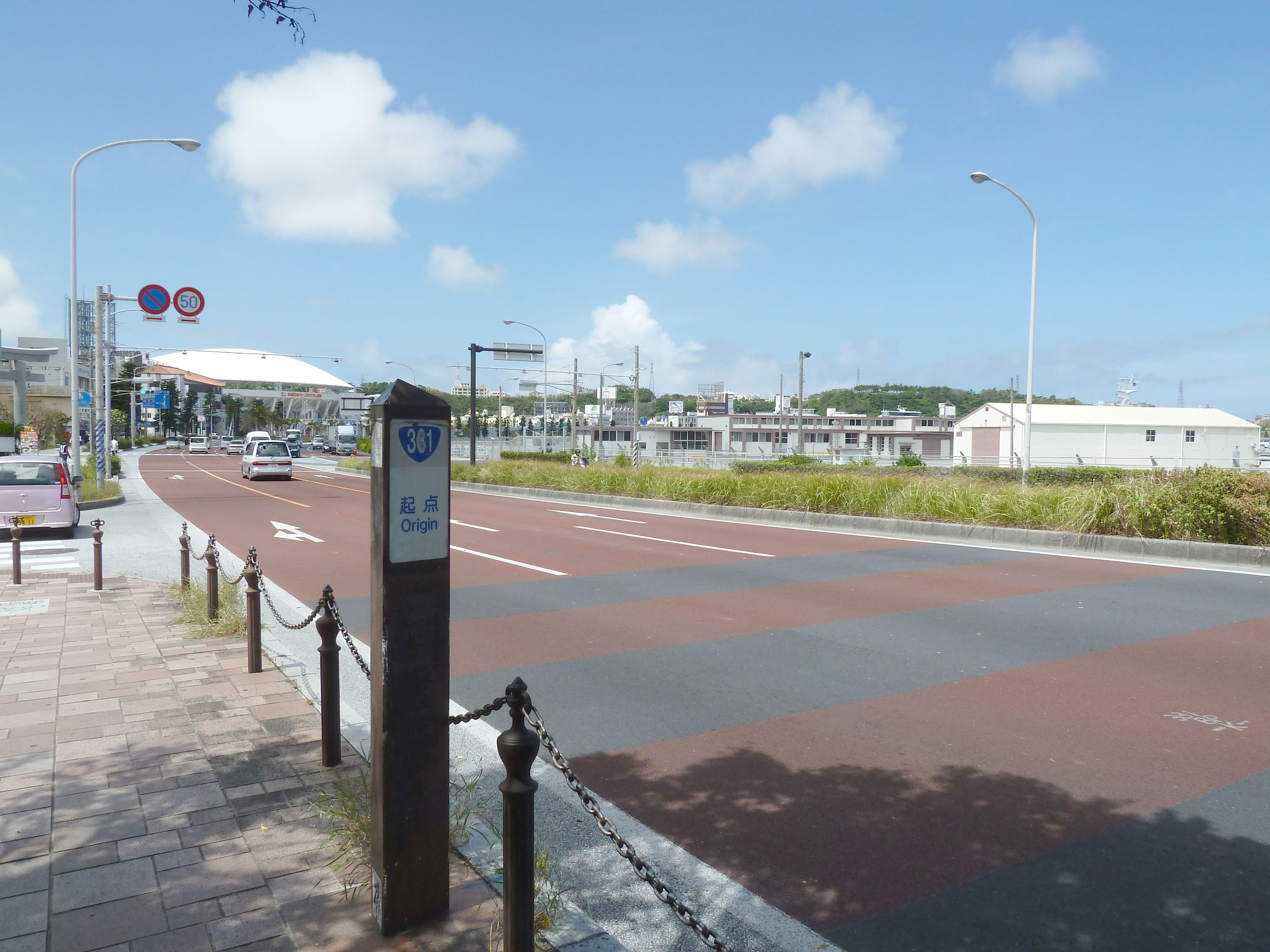

Route information
- Length: 150.4 km (93.5 mi)

Location
- Country: Japan

Highway system
- National highways of Japan; Expressways of Japan
← National Route 330	→ National Route 332

National Route 331 is a national highway of Japan connecting Itoman, Okinawa and Ōgimi, Okinawa in Japan, with a total length of 150.4 km (93.5 mi).

== Route description ==
A section of National Route 331 in Nago is a musical road.
