= Shun Medoruma =

Japanese writer

Shun Medoruma 目取真 俊
- Born: Tadashi Shimabukuro; October 6, 1960 (age 65); Nakijin, Okinawa, Japan
- Occupations: Novelist, short-story writer, essayist, activist
- Writing career
- Genres: Fiction, surrealism, magical realism,
- Notable works: "Droplets" (1997), "Mabuigumi" (Spirit Stuffing) (1998), Fūon: The Crying Wind (2004), Me no oku no mori (Forest at the Back of my Eye (2009)
- Website: blog.goo.ne.jp/awamori777

Shun Medoruma (目取真 俊, Medoruma Shun; born 10 October 1960) is a Japanese writer, who, along with Tatsuhiro Oshiro, Tami Sakiyama, and Eiki Matayoshi, is one of the most important contemporary writers from Okinawa, Japan. Early in his career he won the 11th Ryukyu Shimpō Short Story Prize in 1983 for "Taiwan Woman: Record of a Fish Shoal" ("Gyogunki"), translated by Shi-Lin Loh in Islands of Protest: Japanese Literature from Okinawa, and the New Okinawan Literature Prize in 1986 for "Walking the Street Named Peace Boulevard" ("Heiwa doori to nazukerareta machi o aruite"). He was awarded the 27th Kyushu Arts Festival Literary Prize and the 117th Akutagawa Prize in 1997 for his short story "A Drop of Water" ("Suiteki"). (Also translated as "Droplets" by Michael Molasky, appearing in the collection of translated stories and poems from Japanese into English titled Southern Exposure: Modern Japanese literature from Okinawa.) In 2000, his short story "Mabuigumi" ("Spirit Stuffing," 1998) won the prestigious Kawabata Yasunari and Kiyama Shōhei literary prizes. Medoruma also wrote the screenplay for the film Fūon: The Crying Wind, which received the Montreal Film Festival Innovation Prize in 2004, and published a novel based on the screenplay the same year. His critically acclaimed novel In the Woods of Memory (眼の奥の森, Me no oku no mori; translated by Kasumi Sminkey) is the first full-length novel by an Okinawan writer to be translated and published in English.

== Central themes and concerns ==
Central themes in Medoruma's literary works are the psychological after-effects of the Battle of Okinawa, the Japanese occupation and suppression of Okinawan culture and language, as well as the contradictions of force in dealing with the presence of American soldiers on the islands. Three of Medoruma's most important works dealing with the theme of war are the aforementioned "Droplets" and "Spirit Stuffing" as well as "Tree of Butterflies" ("Gunchō no ki," 2000), translated by Aimée Mizuno, which portray how war survivors physically bear the burden of survival without resolution of their war trauma. Medoruma's war fiction also depicts the unexplained and fragmented emanations of suppressed war trauma and memory that children of war survivors witnessed and grew up with on a daily basis. Medoruma's novel Rainbow Bird and short story "Hope" provocatively explore the possibilities of hope through rage at the injustices that arise due to the military bases in Okinawa within the "violent" lives of ordinary Okinawans who have typically been excluded from society through social norms of "good" and "evil" or sanitized categorizations of force as "violence."

== Social criticism and activism ==
Medoruma also writes social commentary and criticism about Okinawa's current and historical relationship with Japan and the United States and emerged as an important public intellectual in Okinawa and Japan through his writing after he was awarded the Akutagawa Prize in 1997. His commentary and criticism has been published in local Okinawan newspapers, leading national journals, collected and reprinted in books, and his blog, "Uminari no shima kara". Medoruma has also been actively supporting and participating in protests of the construction of an offshore military base in Henoko.

== Selected works ==
Short Stories

- "Droplets" (水滴 Suiteki). 1997. Translated by Michael Molasky. In Southern Exposure: Modern Japanese Literature from Okinawa, edited by Michael Molasky and Steve Rabson, 255–85. Honolulu: University of Hawaii Press, 2000.
- “Hope” (Machi-monogatari — Kibō). Translated by Steve Rabson. In, Japan Policy Research Institute Critique 6, no. 12 (1999): http://www.jpri.org/publications/critiques/critique_VI_12.html.
- "Mabuigumi" (魂込み Spirit Stuffing ). 1998. Translated by Kyle Ikeda. MĀNOA: Living Spirit: Literature and Resurgence in Okinawa 23, no. 1 (2011): 112–34.
- “Fūon” (風音 "The Wind Sound"). 1997. Translated by Kyoko Selden and Alisa Freedman. Review of Japanese Culture and Society 21, (2009): 137–72.
- "Taiwan Woman: Record of a Fish Shoal" (魚群記 Gyogunki). 1983. Translated by Shi-Lin Loh. In Islands of Protest: Japanese Literature from Okinawa, edited by Davinder L. Bhowmik and Steve Rabson, 49–70. Honolulu: University of Hawaii Press, 2016.
- "Tree of Butterflies" (群蝶の木 Gunchō no ki). 2000. Translated by Aimée Mizuo. In Islands of Protest: Japanese Literature from Okinawa, edited by Davinder L. Bhowmik and Steve Rabson, 71–112. Honolulu: University of Hawaii Press, 2016.

Novels

- In the Woods of Memory (眼の奥の森, Me no oku no mori; translated by Kasumi Sminkey). 2017. Berkeley, CA: Stone Bridge Press.
- Rainbow Bird (虹の鳥, Niji no tori). 2006. Tokyo: Kage Shobō.
- Fūon: The Crying Wind (風音, Fūon). 2004. Tokyo: Ritoru moa.
