= Beat (1998 film) =

- DVD cover
- Directed by: Amon Miyamoto
- Screenplay by: Amon Miyamoto
- Release date: 1998 (Venice)
- Country: Japan

Beat is a 1998 Japanese film. Directed by Amon Miyamoto, the film's narrative is set in Okinawa in the 1960s, during the military occupation by the American government. The plot was inspired by Naminoue no Maria, a novel by the Okinawan writer Eiki Matayoshi.

Beat was screened during Critics' Week at the 1998 Venice International Film Festival.

== Cast ==
- Claude Maki - Takeshi
- Yuki Uchida - Michi
- Dean Stapleton - Ryan
- Naoto Hirata - The Youth
- Judy Motomura - Maria
- Toshiya Nagasawa - Kazuo
- Ayako Kawahara - Lee

== Crew ==
- Amon Miyamoto - director, screenwriter
- Shinya Kawai - producer
- Takashige Ichise - producer
- Genkichi Hasegawa - cinematographer
- Hirohide Abe - editor
- Hiroshi Butsuda - special effects
- Makoto Ishihara - associate producer
- Yuji Tsuzuki - production designer
