= Fuon =

- Film poster
- Directed by: Yōichi Higashi
- Screenplay by: Shun Medoruma
- Based on: Kazane and Utsumi by Shun Medoruma
- Produced by: Tetsujiro Yamagami
- Starring: Muneo Uema; Haruko Kato; Miho Tsumiki; Ken Mitsuishi; Saburo Kitamura
- Cinematography: Takahiro Tsutai
- Edited by: Yōichi Higashi
- Music by: Taraf de Haïdouks; Takashi Hirayasu
- Production company: SIGLO Ltd.
- Distributed by: SIGLO Ltd.
- Release date: July 31, 2004 (Japan)
- Running time: 106 minutes
- Country: Japan
- Language: Japanese

Fuon (Japanese: 風音), also known as The Crying Wind, is a 2004 Japanese coming of age drama film directed by Yōichi Higashi. It was adapted by Shun Medoruma from two of his own short stories, "Kazane" and "Utsumi". The film tells the story of two young boys in Okinawa who are fascinated by local tales of the "Crying Head", the skull of a kamikaze pilot shot down in World War II. It stars Muneo Uema (a non-professional actor) in the lead role, in addition to Haruko Kato, Miho Tsumiki, Ken Mitsuishi and Saburo Kitamura. Takashi Hirayasu and the group Taraf de Haïdouks co-composed the film's score. Fuon premiered at the 27th Montreal World Film Festival before being theatrically released by SIGLO Ltd. on July 31, 2004, in Japan.

== Premise ==
The setting is the present-day, more than fifty years after the end of World War II, in a small seaside village in northern Okinawa. In a burial ground on a cliff near the ocean, resides the skull of a kamikaze pilot who was shot down in the final days of the war. The villagers call it the "Crying Head" for the sound the bullet hole in the skull makes when the wind blows. They have enshrined it as the guardian deity of the island and fear it.

Fleeing her abusive husband, Kazue and her 10 year old son, Masashi, come to live in the village with her elderly mother. There Masashi befriends 12 year old Akira, the grandson of aging fisherman Seikichi. The boys are fascinated by tales of the skull. One summer day, they decide to find it. After locating it, they mess around with the "Crying Head". From that day on, the "sound of the wind" stops, and ripples begin to rise in the peaceful daily life of the village. At the same time, an old woman visits the island. She is the pilot's former lover. She is dying and wishes to find out what happened to him.

As the memories of those who live on the island, those who come from outside the island, and those who died on the island overlap, everyone's secrets are slowly revealed.

== Cast ==
- Muneo Uema as Seikichi Toma
- Haruko Kato as Shiho Fujino
  - Mio Kato as Shiho, Age 17
- Miho Tsumiki as Kazue Shimazaki
- Ken Mitsuishi as Hisaki Shimazaki
- Saburo Kitamura as Ishikawa Ward Mayor
- Taeko Yoshida as Makoto Kinjo
- Fumio Haruya as Ear-Cutting Uncle
- Takahito Hosoyamada as Shinichi Kano
- Tomoya Iju as Masashi Shimazaki
- Asaya Shimabukuro as Akira
- Akira Fukuhara

== Background ==
Medoruma's original short stories were first published in 1997, and translated to English by Kyoko Selden and Alisa Freedman. After the film's release, Medoruma expanded the short stories into a full novel titled Fuon: The Crying Wind.

== Release ==
Fuon was theatrically released by SIGLO Ltd. on July 31, 2004, in Japan. The film was later released to DVD on August 5, 2005 by Toei Video.

== Reception ==
Writing for Variety, Derek Elley called the film "Clumsily scripted," and said that it "aims for a semi-mystical tone, but is sunk by largely dull performances." He also stated that the "magical touch" Higashi brought to his previous films Village of Dreams and My Grandpa is "largely absent" in Fuon, and he believed that the film was clearly "constrained by its low budget."

A review for kamikazeimages.net stated that "This high-quality Japanese film by a native Okinawan writer allows viewers to get a glimpse of rural life on the island and the influence that the tragic events of WWII still have on Japan's oldest generation."

== Awards and nominations ==
27th Montreal World Film Festival

- Won: Innovation Award (Yōichi Higashi)
- Nominated: Grand Prix des Amériques (Yōichi Higashi)
