= Okinawa Prefecture =

Prefecture of Japan

Okinawa Prefecture 沖縄県
- Prefecture

Name transcription(s)
  - Japanese: 沖縄県
  - Rōmaji: Okinawa-ken
  - Okinawan: Uchinaachin
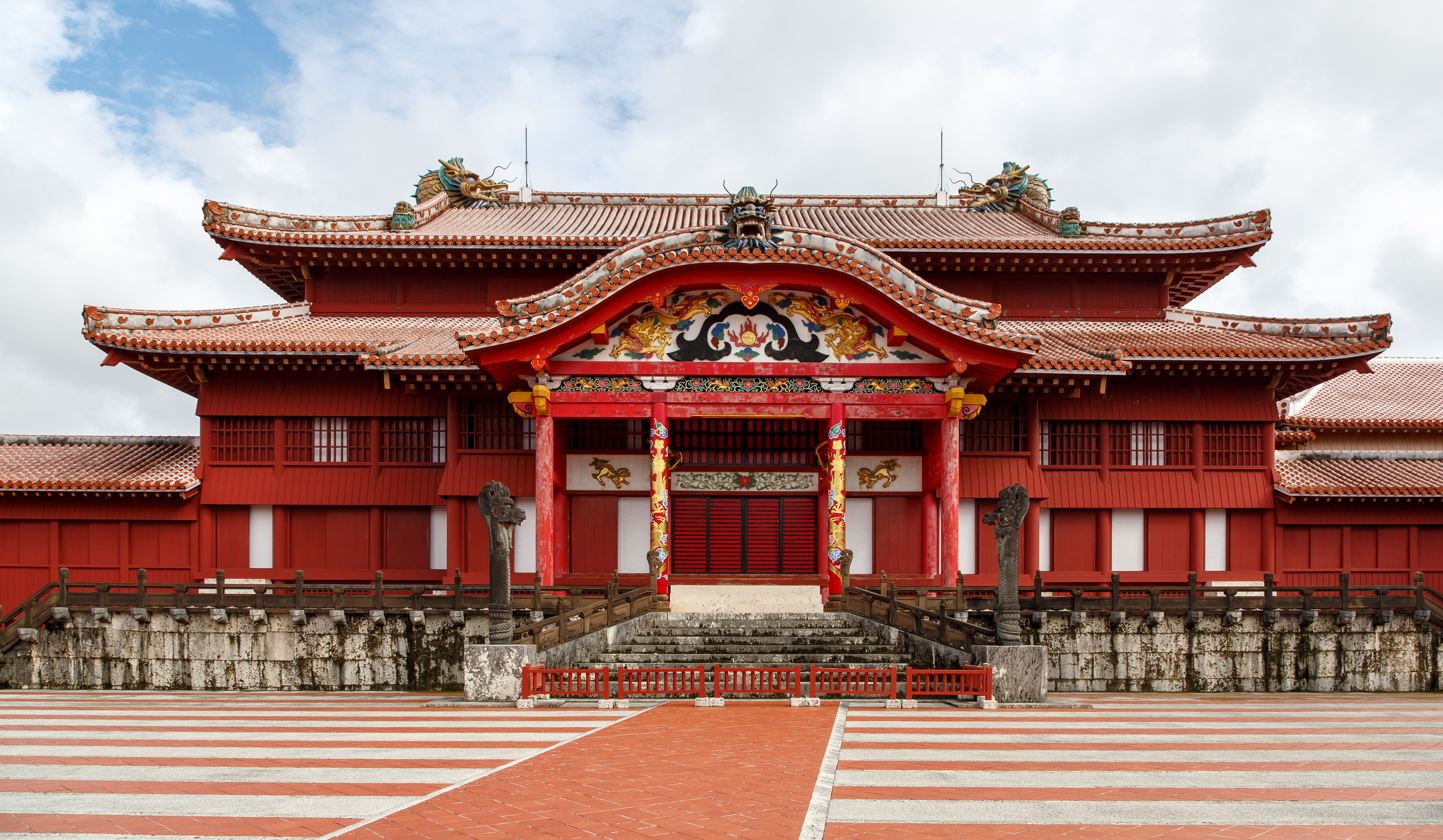
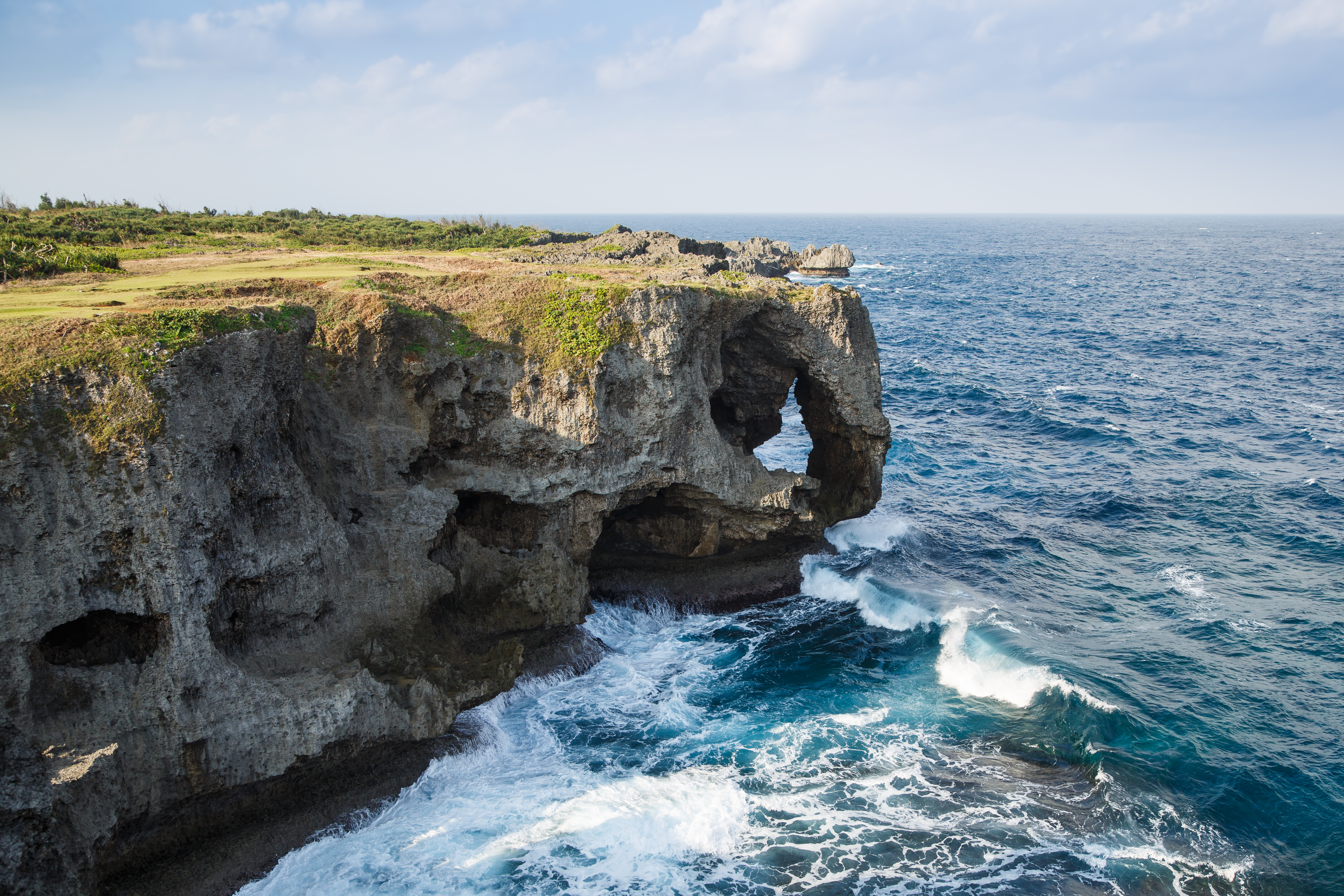
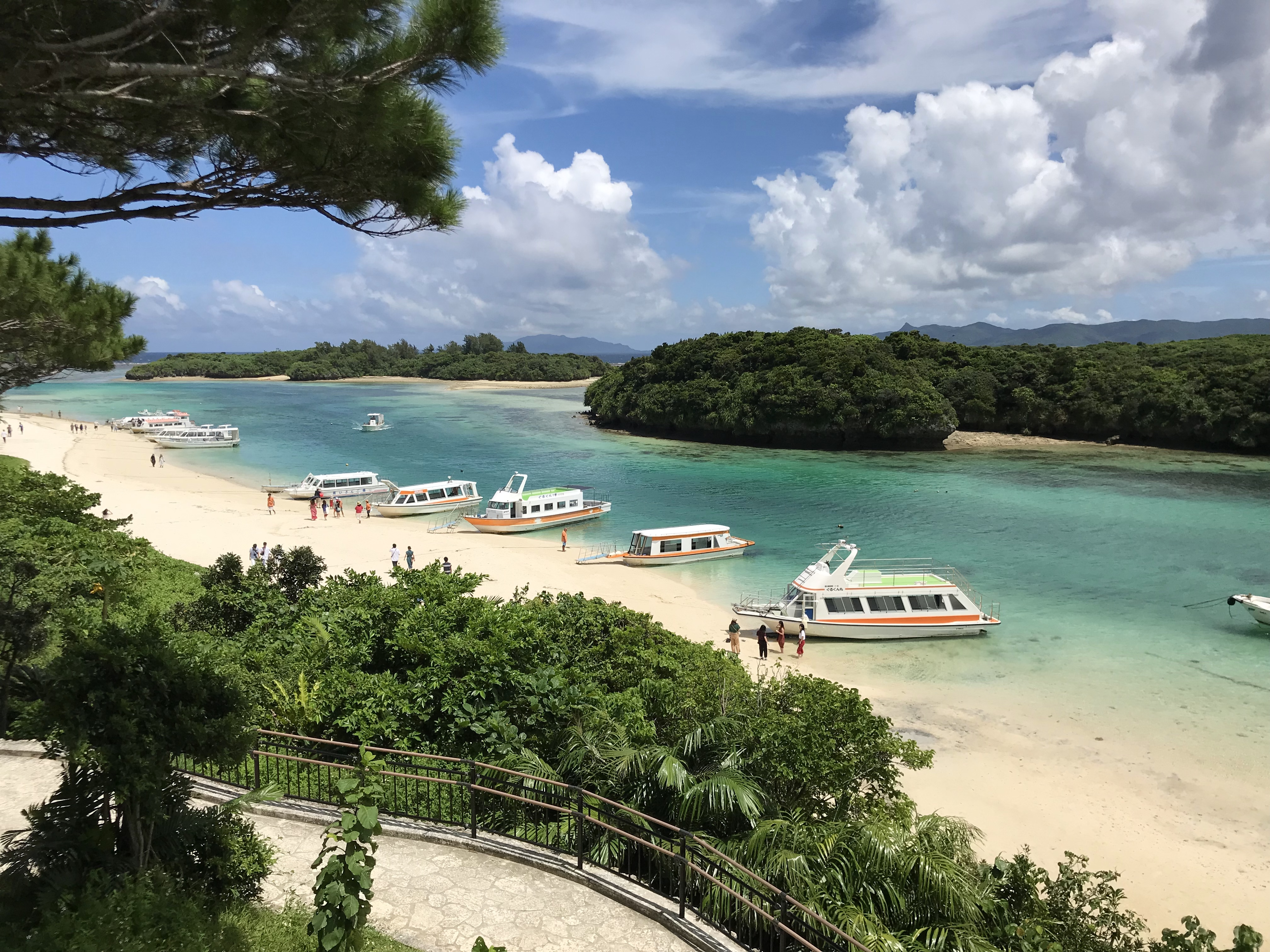
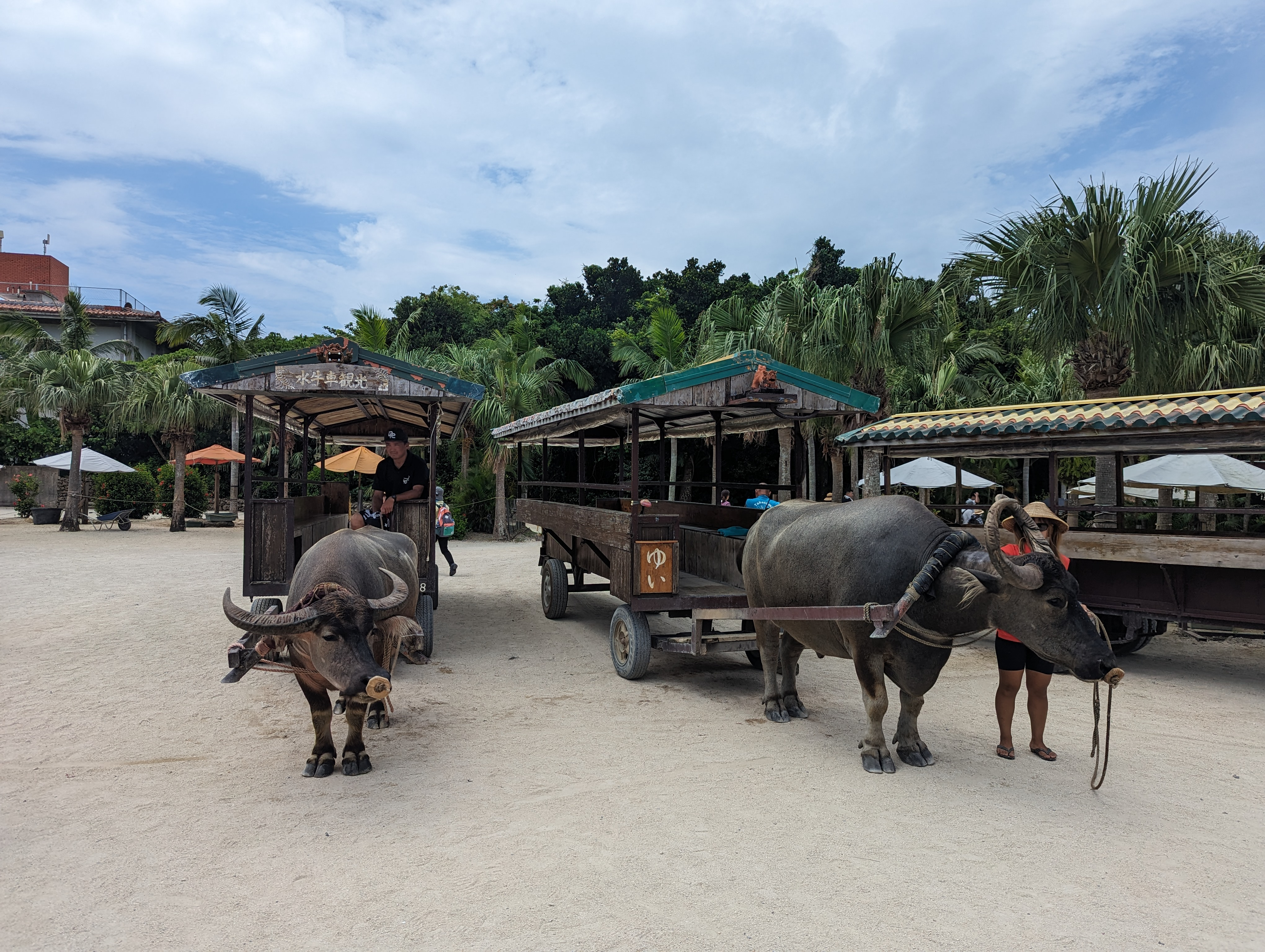
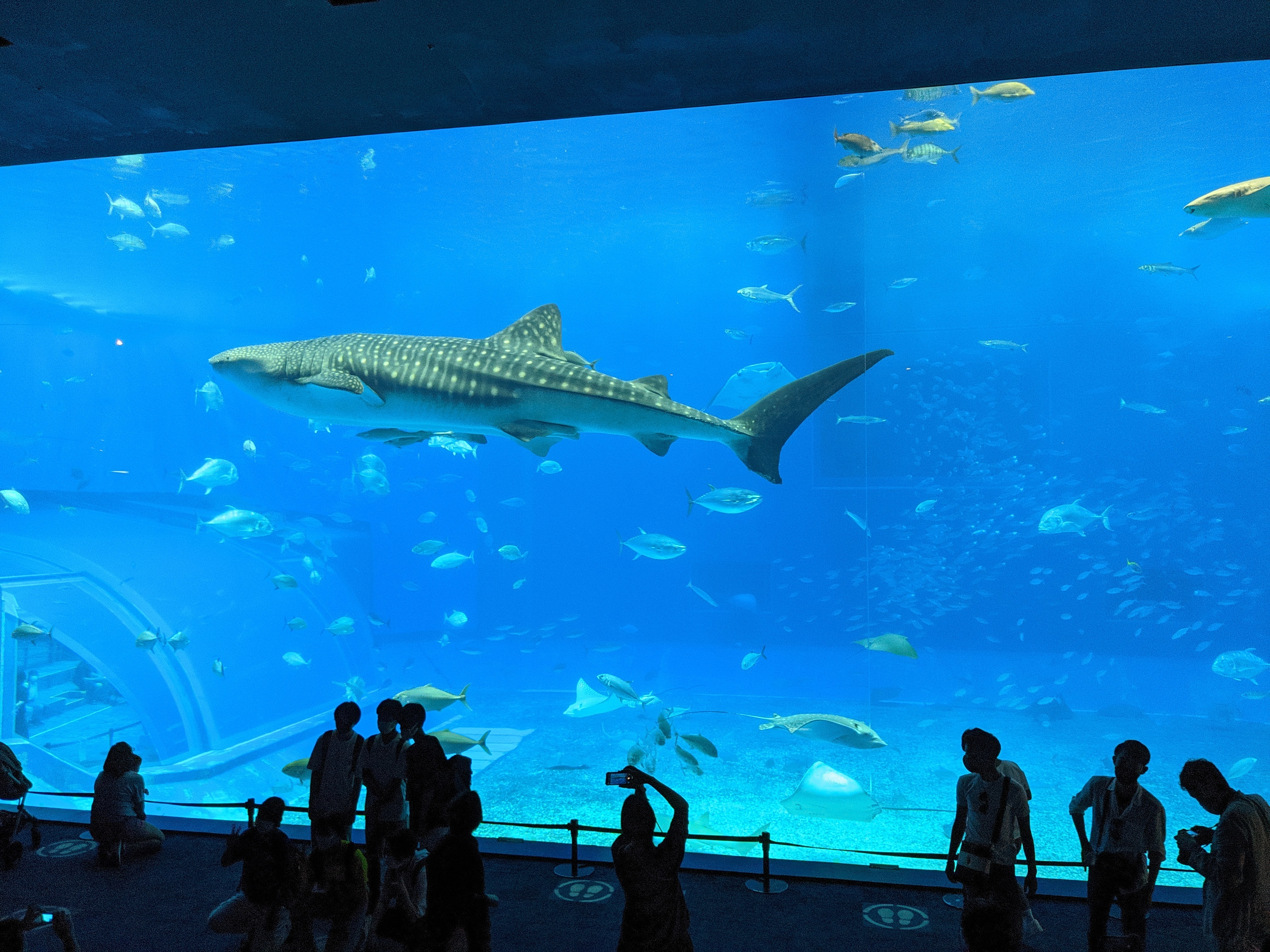
- Shuri Castle Cape Manzamo Kabira Bay Bullock carts on Taketomi Island Okinawa Churaumi Aquarium

- Flag Emblem
- Anthem: "Song of Okinawa Prefecture" (沖縄県民の歌, Okinawa Kenmin no Uta)
- Coordinates: 26°30′N 128°0′E
- Country: Japan
- Region: Kyushu
- Islands: Okinawa, Daitō, Miyako, Yaeyama, and Senkaku
- Capital: Naha
- Subdivisions: Districts: 5, Municipalities: 41

Government
  - Governor: Genta Koja

Area
  - Total: 2,281 km^{2} (881 sq mi)
  - Rank: 44th

Population (October 1, 2025)
  - Total: 1,468,220
  - Rank: 25th
  - Density: 643.7/km^{2} (1,667/sq mi)

GDP
  - Total: JP¥4,462 billion US$32.9 billion (2022)
- ISO 3166 code: JP-47
- Website: www.pref.okinawa.lg.jp
- Symbols of Japan
- Bird: Okinawa woodpecker (Sapheopipo noguchii)
- Fish: Banana fish (Pterocaesio diagramma, "takasago", "gurukun")
- Flower: Deego (Erythrina variegata)
- Tree: Pinus luchuensis ("ryūkyūmatsu")

Okinawa Prefecture (Japanese: 沖縄県, Hepburn: Okinawa-ken; pronounced [ò̞.k̟ʲí.nä́.β̞ä́(.kè̞ɴ̀)]; Okinawan: ウチナーチン, romanized: Uchinaachin) is the southernmost and westernmost prefecture of Japan. It consists of three main island groups—the Okinawa Islands, the Sakishima Islands, and the Daitō Islands—spread across a maritime zone approximately 1,000 kilometers east to west and 400 kilometers north to south. Despite a modest land area of 2,281 km^{2} (880 sq mi), Okinawa's territorial extent over surrounding seas makes its total area nearly half the combined size of Honshu, Shikoku, and Kyushu. Of its 160 islands, 49 are inhabited. The largest and most populous island is Okinawa Island, which hosts the capital city, Naha, as well as major urban centers such as Okinawa, Uruma, and Urasoe. The prefecture has a subtropical climate, characterized by warm temperatures and high rainfall throughout the year. People from the Nansei Islands, including Okinawa, the Sakishima Islands, and parts of Kagoshima Prefecture, are often collectively referred to as Ryukyuans. However, there are significant cultural and customary differences between individual islands and even between local communities.

Historically the center of the Ryukyu Kingdom, Okinawa long served as a trading hub; the kingdom participated in the Chinese tributary system—maintaining formal tribute relations with the Ming and Qing—and retained distinct statehood until it was incorporated into Japan as Okinawa Prefecture in 1879 following the Ryukyu Disposition. After the Battle of Okinawa (1945), the islands were under U.S. administration until reversion to Japan in 1972, and today host a large share of U.S. military facilities in Japan (around 70% of the land area exclusively used by U.S. forces in Japan and amounting to about 10% of the prefecture's total land area), a continuing source of local and national debate. A small but persistent independence movement exists, reflecting Okinawa's distinct historical trajectory and identity.

Over time, Okinawa developed its own distinctive traditions, cuisine, and performing arts. Today, Okinawan music, characterized by the distinctive sanshin instrument, and festivals such as Eisa have gained popularity across the country. The islands are also the birthplace of karate, later popularized on the Japanese mainland and worldwide. The prefectural economy is predominantly service-based, with tourism and related services as major drivers, while manufacturing plays a comparatively small role.

== History ==
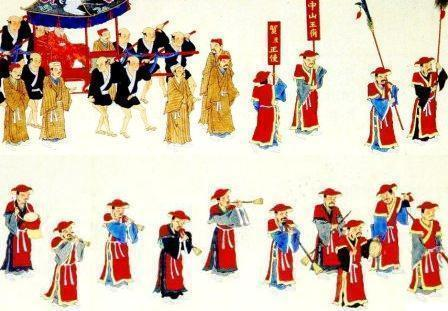
A depiction of the 1710 Ryukyuan mission to Edo

=== Prehistoric and ancient history ===
The prehistoric history of Okinawa differs significantly from that of mainland Japan. Prior to written records, it is generally divided into two periods: the Paleolithic era and the Shellmidden period (Kaizuka period). The earliest evidence of human activity in Okinawa includes the Yamashita Cave Man, dating back approximately 32,000 years, and the Minatogawa Man from around 18,000 years ago. In 2012, the world's oldest known fishhook was discovered in the Sakitari Cave site in Nanjo City, Okinawa Prefecture.

The Shellmidden Period in Okinawa roughly corresponds to the Jōmon through Heian periods of mainland Japan, with a chronological gap of about 10,000 years from the Paleolithic era.

At the Kogachibaru Shell Mound, archaeological findings include pottery styles such as Sobata and Ichiki, which originate from the Kyushu region, obsidian from Koshidake in Saga Prefecture, and jade from Itoigawa in Niigata Prefecture used for ornamental pendants. These discoveries indicate that close exchanges with Kyushu were already taking place during this time.

However, by the middle of the Shellmidden Period, Okinawan pottery began to exhibit clearly localized characteristics. Examples include the Iha and Ogido pottery styles, which are distinct to the region.

In contrast to the Shellmidden culture of Okinawa Island, which was influenced primarily by mainland Japan, the prehistoric cultures of the Miyako and Yaeyama Islands were shaped more significantly by southern cultures, including those from the Philippines.

=== Gusuku and Sanzan periods ===
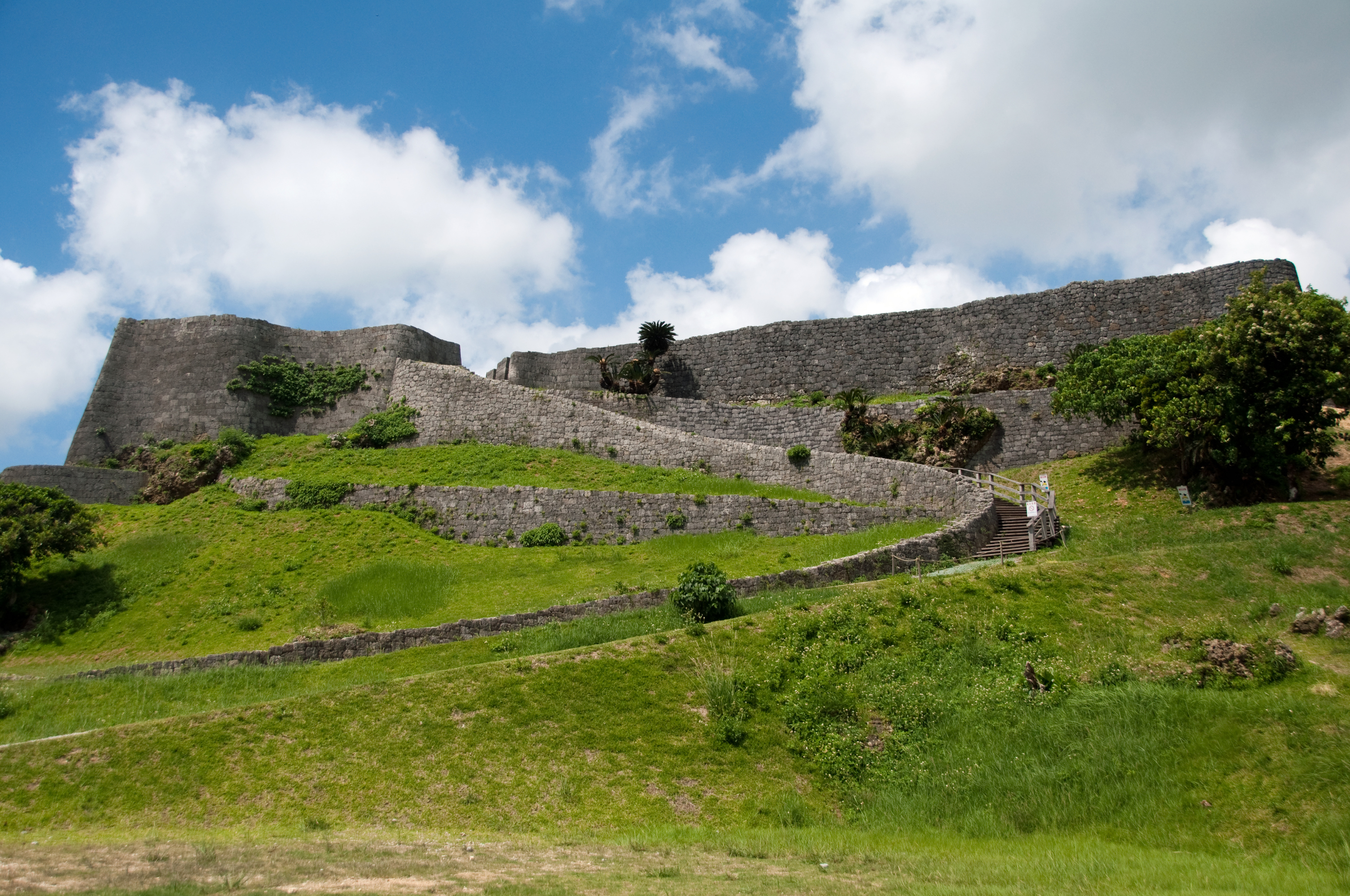
Ruins of Katsuren Castle

From the 12th century onward, Okinawa entered the Gusuku period, characterized by the development of an agrarian society. During this time, populations moved from coastal dunes to more fertile limestone plateaus, leading to significant population growth and the beginnings of international trade. Local chieftains, known as Aji, constructed fortified residences called Gusuku to protect their territories and expand their influence through foreign trade. Gusuku sites are found throughout the Ryukyu Islands, from the Amami Islands in the north to the Yaeyama Islands in the south, with estimates ranging from 300 to 400 sites in total. Early Gusuku were generally small, covering about 1,000 square meters, but larger fortresses appeared in later periods.

By the 14th century, Okinawa Island was divided into three polities, marking the beginning of the Sanzan period. These were the Kingdom of Hokuzan, centered at Nakijin Castle in the north; the Kingdom of Chūzan, centered at Urasoe Castle in the central region; and the Kingdom of Nanzan, centered at Ōzato Castle in the south.

According to official histories compiled by the royal government in Shuri—such as the Chūzan Seikan, Chūzan Seifu, and Kyūyō—the first royal lineage of Ryukyu was the legendary Tenson dynasty. After internal conflict during its 25th generation, a local Aji named Shunten from Urasoe was supported by the people, quelled the unrest, and was crowned as the first king of the Ryukyu Kingdom. However, these early historical accounts are heavily mythologized, and even if Shunten was a real historical figure, he likely ruled only the Urasoe area as an Aji. The Shunten dynasty lasted for three generations before being overthrown by the Eiso dynasty, which in turn was replaced by the Satto dynasty after four generations. By this time, Okinawa Island had effectively split into the three kingdoms of Hokuzan, Chūzan, and Nanzan.

In 1372, the Ming dynasty of China dispatched an envoy, Yang Zai, to the Kingdom of Chūzan, requesting the king, Satto, to enter into a tributary relationship. Satto agreed, and soon after, the kings of Nanzan (Chōsatto) and Hokuzan (Hanishi) also began paying tribute to the Ming court, bringing all three kingdoms into the Chinese tributary system.

In 1406, the Aji of Sashiki, Shō Hashi, overthrew King Bunei of the Satto dynasty and installed his father, Shō Shishō, as king, establishing the First Shō Dynasty. In 1416, Shō Hashi capitalized on dissatisfaction among the Aji of Hokuzan with their king, Hananchi, and conquered the kingdom. The Kingdom of Nanzan, plagued by internal conflict under the rule of Tarumoi, was defeated by Shō Hashi in 1429, completing the unification of Okinawa Island under the Chūzan Kingdom.

=== Ryukyu Kingdom period ===
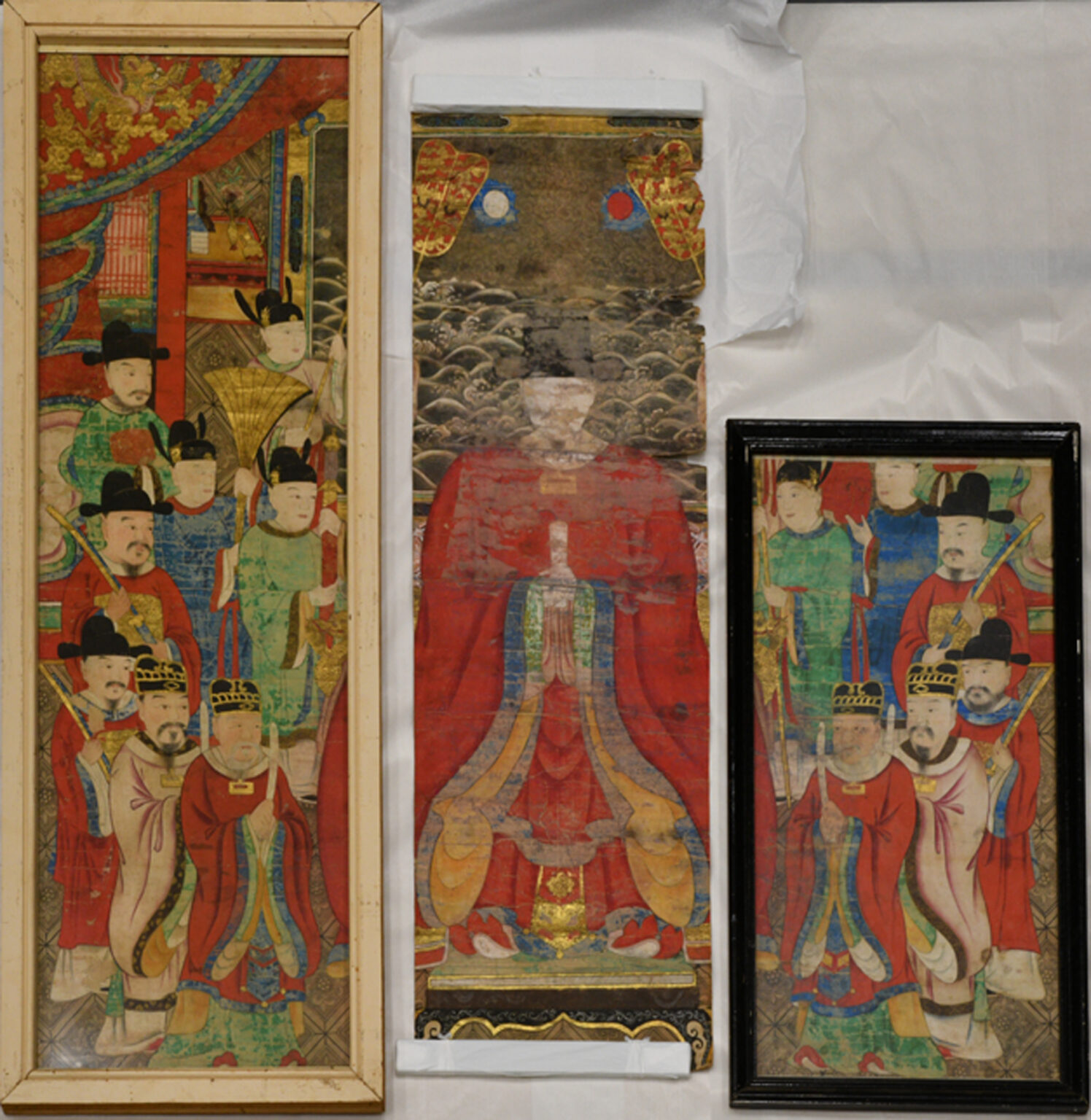
Portrait of an unknown king of the Ryukyu Kingdom, possibly Shō Ken, late 16th century or early 17th century

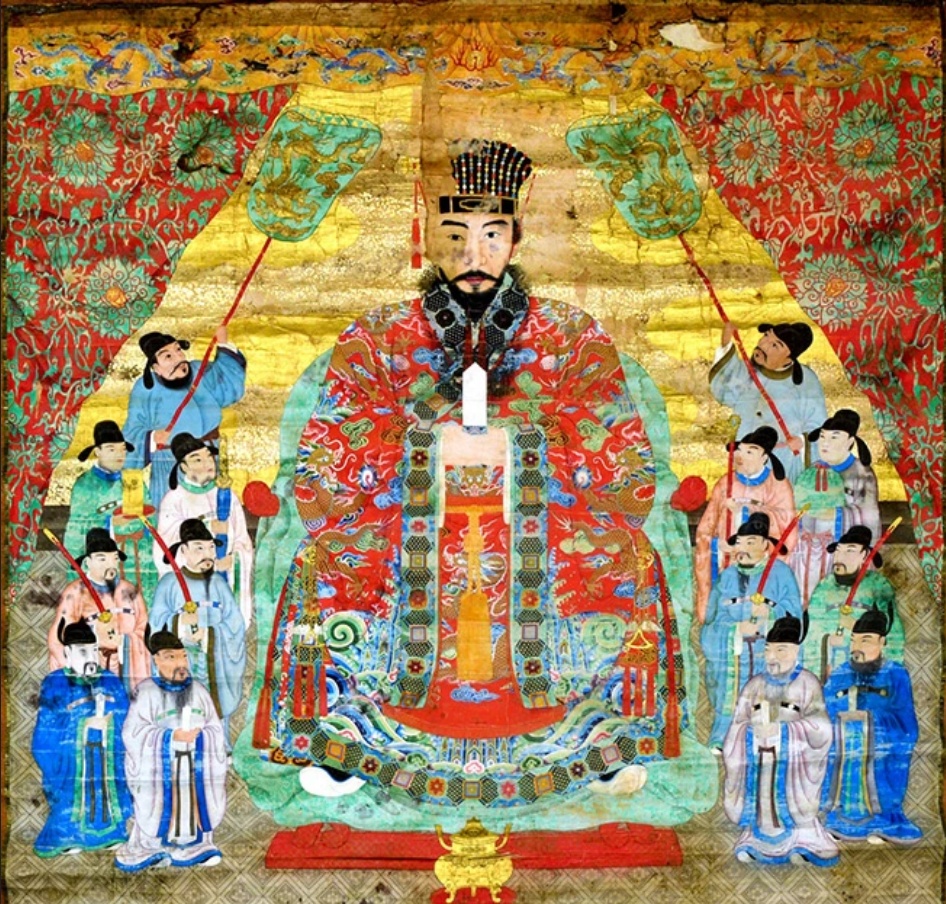
Scroll replica of a mural of Shō Iku, king of the Ryukyu Kingdom (r. 1835–1847), Mō Chōki in 1852

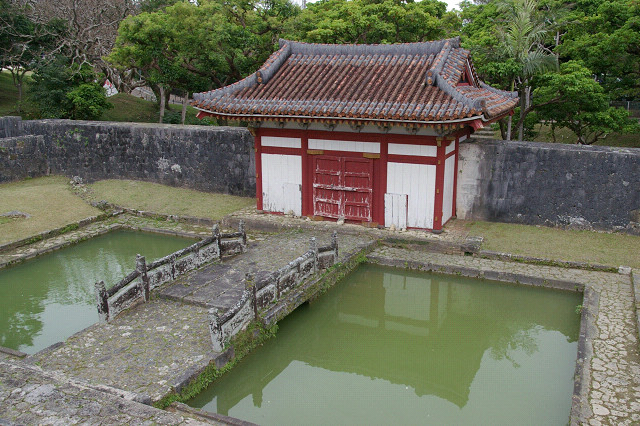
Enkaku-ji, the royal mausoleum temple of the Second Shō Dynasty

The First Shō Dynasty experienced political instability due to the early deaths of several kings. After the death of the fifth king, Shō Kinpuku, a succession dispute known as the Shirii-Tumui rebellion broke out. Order was eventually restored when Shō Taikyū ascended as the sixth king. During his reign, another major conflict, the Gosamaru–Amawari rebellion, occurred, but Shō Taikyū was able to suppress it. His successor, King Shō Toku, was known as a tyrant. After his death, a coup led by royal officials installed the high-ranking bureaucrat Kanemaru as king. Kanemaru took the royal name Shō En, founding the Second Shō Dynasty.

Under the rule of the third king of the dynasty, Shō Shin, a centralized administration was firmly established. Shō Shin relocated powerful regional chieftains (Aji) to the capital of Shuri and appointed state officials to govern the provinces directly. The territorial extent of the Ryukyu Kingdom also expanded, covering the area from the Amami Islands in the north to the Yaeyama Islands in the south. Culturally, this era was a golden age for the kingdom, with significant development in the arts, religion, and architecture.

By actively participating in the tribute system with the Ming dynasty, the Ryukyu Kingdom received preferential treatment and became a key intermediary trading hub in East Asia. Many of the tribute goods presented to China originated from Japan, while Chinese goods were exported to Japan through Ryukyu. Southeast Asia, China, and Japan were Ryukyu's primary trade partners, and the kingdom also maintained trade with the Korean Peninsula. However, Ryukyu's significance as a trade hub declined in the 16th century with the Age of Discovery, as Portuguese and Spanish merchants entered East Asia, and China gradually relaxed its maritime prohibition policies.

The Miyako Islands and Yaeyama Islands had long been politically fragmented. In 1474, local strongman Nakasone Toyomiya of Miyako Island submitted to the Ryukyu Kingdom, bringing the island under centralized control. In 1500, Ryukyuan forces defeated Oyake Akahachi, the ruler of Ishigaki Island. In 1522, Nakasone Toyomiya conquered Yonaguni Island, completing the unification of the Yaeyama Islands under Ryukyuan rule. The Amami Islands in the north also came under Ryukyuan control by 1466.

In 1609, the Shimazu clan of the Satsuma Domain invaded the Ryukyu Kingdom in what is known as the Invasion of Ryukyu. King Shō Nei surrendered, and the kingdom became a vassal state under Satsuma's control. The Amami Islands were ceded to Satsuma as part of the settlement. While Ryukyu was partially integrated into Japan's feudal han system, it continued to function as a nominally independent kingdom and maintained its tributary relationship with China.Ryukyuan sovereignty was maintained since complete annexation would have created a conflict with China. The Satsuma clan earned considerable profits from trade with China during a period in which foreign trade was heavily restricted by the shogunate. Although Satsuma maintained strong influence over the islands, the Ryukyu Kingdom maintained a considerable degree of domestic political freedom for over two hundred years.

In the mid-17th century, the Ryukyuan reformer Haneji Chōshū implemented significant political and social reforms promoting pro-Japanese policies. In the mid-18th century, Sai On, a statesman and scholar, continued these reforms and greatly improved the internal administration of the kingdom.

In 1816, two British ships visited Ryukyu but made no demands for trade or missionary activity. In 1844, France became the first European country to officially request trade with Ryukyu. In 1853, Commodore Matthew Perry of the United States East India Squadron stopped in Ryukyu prior to his negotiations with the Tokugawa shogunate in Japan.

=== First Okinawa Prefecture period ===
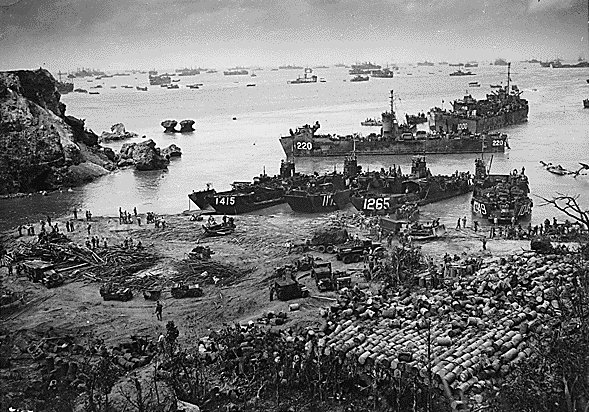
U.S. troops landing in Okinawa

Following the Meiji Restoration, Japan began its modernization process by abolishing the han system and establishing prefectures in 1871. That same year, the Mudan Incident occurred when a Ryukyuan ship drifted to Taiwan and its crew was killed by local indigenous people. This event became a pretext for Japan to assert control over the Ryukyu Kingdom. In 1872, Japan reclassified the kingdom as the Ryukyu Domain, a move known as the Ryukyu Disposition. To avoid backlash from the Qing dynasty and Ryukyuan royalty, the Meiji government initially designated Ryukyu as a "domain" rather than a "prefecture", a designation that had already been abolished in mainland Japan.

In 1874, another Ryukyuan shipwreck incident led to the Taiwan Expedition of 1874 (the Botan War), in which Japan dispatched troops to Taiwan. During post-conflict negotiations, the Qing acknowledged Japan's actions as "a righteous act of protecting its people." Japan interpreted this as de facto recognition of Ryukyu as Japanese territory and subsequently ordered the Ryukyu Domain to cease its tribute missions to China. This triggered internal division within the Ryukyuan court between pro-Japan and pro-China factions.

In March 1879, the Japanese government officially abolished the Ryukyu Domain and established Okinawa Prefecture, relocating King Shō Tai to Tokyo. Some Ryukyuan nobles and civilians fled to China and appealed to the Qing government to restore the Ryukyu Kingdom. Resistance in the Miyako and Yaeyama Islands was especially strong, culminating in the Kōchi Incident, in which locals killed a Japanese interpreter. However, the rebellion was eventually suppressed.

The Qing dynasty invited former U.S. President Ulysses S. Grant to mediate the dispute. Grant proposed a compromise in which the Okinawa Islands would go to Japan, while the Miyako and Yaeyama Islands would be ceded to China. The Qing countered with a plan that would return the Ryukyu Kingdom to the Okinawa Islands, assign the Amami Islands to Japan, and annex the Miyako and Yaeyama Islands to China. Ultimately, the negotiations failed. After the First Sino-Japanese War (1894–1895), the Qing ceded Taiwan to Japan and lost influence in the region, silencing calls for the restoration of Ryukyu.

In the early years of direct Japanese rule, a policy known as the Old Customs Preservation Policy (旧慣温存政策, Kyūkan Onzon Seisaku) was implemented, maintaining Ryukyuan land and tax systems, which slowed Okinawa's modernization. After the First Sino-Japanese War, Japan replaced this policy with an assimilation strategy, accelerating Okinawa's Japanization. However, Okinawa's strategic and economic importance declined, particularly after Taiwan became Japan's new southern frontier and sugar-producing center.

In the 20th century, Japan undertook major land reforms and prioritized sugar production in Okinawa, though economic development remained far behind mainland Japan. Transportation infrastructure also modernized, with new roads, railways, and ferry routes to the Japanese mainland established in the early 1900s. During the early Taishō era, Okinawa briefly prospered as sugar prices soared due to World War I. However, by the late Taishō and early Shōwa era, the Great Depression struck, causing widespread famine. Many impoverished farmers resorted to eating the toxic cycad plant to survive, in what became known as the "Cycad Hell" (Sotetsu Jigoku (蘇鉄地獄)). Many Okinawans migrated to mainland Japan or abroad. Between 1923 and 1930, Okinawans accounted for 10% of all Japanese emigrants. Remittances from overseas workers contributed 40% to 65% of the prefecture's annual budget.

In the 1930s, Japan increasingly pursued a path of militarism. By the 1940s, Okinawa Prefecture was integrated into the wartime regime. The government enforced standard Japanese language use and replaced traditional Ryukyuan name pronunciations with Japanese ones as part of a broader imperial assimilation policy.

In 1943, the Japanese military began seizing land in Okinawa to build airbases. In 1944, the 32nd Army was stationed in Okinawa, requisitioning resources from civilians and initiating evacuations to mainland Japan and Taiwan. In August 1944, the evacuation ship Tsushima Maru, carrying about 1,700 evacuees, was sunk by an American submarine, resulting in 1,476 deaths. In October that same year, Naha was bombed in the 10-10 air raids, destroying 90% of the city.

In 1945, Okinawa became the site of the largest ground battle on Japanese soil during the Pacific War. The Battle of Okinawa resulted in the deaths of approximately 12,520 American soldiers and an estimated 200,000 Japanese personnel, including military and civilians.

The United States military landed on the coast of Yomitan Village, Okinawa Island, on April 1 and quickly secured control over the northern half of the island. The Japanese forces, facing overwhelming American attacks, retreated to the southern part of the island. Shuri Castle, which served as the headquarters of the Japanese command, was destroyed, and on June 23, organized resistance ended with the suicide of Lieutenant General Mitsuru Ushijima, the commanding officer of the Okinawan defense forces, and other high-ranking staff at Mabuni.

Over approximately three months of intense fighting, a large number of civilians were killed as a result of American naval bombardment that affected residential areas, extensive aerial bombing, and the use of flamethrowers against natural caves (gama) and civilian air-raid shelters. Additionally, there were numerous instances of group suicides among civilians, driven in part by fear of American capture. It is estimated that one in four residents of Okinawa perished, and the island was left devastated.

=== Postwar disposition disputes ===
During World War II, the Allied powers engaged in multiple rounds of discussions regarding the postwar status of the Ryukyu Islands. At the Cairo Conference in 1943, U.S. President Franklin D. Roosevelt proactively raised the issue of Ryukyu's sovereignty, suggesting that China might administer the islands after the war. However, Chinese leader Chiang Kai-shek responded only cautiously, proposing instead a joint occupation and international trusteeship. As a result, the Cairo Declaration made no explicit reference to the Ryukyus, instead stating that territories such as Taiwan and the Pescadores—seized by Japan—should be returned to China. Historians believe Chiang hesitated because he was unsure whether Roosevelt's offer was sincere or a diplomatic probe, and because the wartime Nationalist government relied heavily on American support and wished to avoid a territorial dispute.

As the Pacific War progressed, the U.S. military increasingly emphasized the strategic importance of the Ryukyus. In 1944, some U.S. officials proposed exclusive control of the islands to serve as a bulwark against Soviet expansion and threats from the Asian mainland. Roosevelt reportedly expressed to Joseph Stalin his support for returning the Ryukyus to China, but no formal agreements emerged from the Cairo, Yalta, or Potsdam meetings. The Potsdam Declaration stated only that Japanese sovereignty would be limited to the islands of Honshu, Kyushu, Shikoku, and Hokkaido, while other territories—including the Ryukyus—would be subject to future decisions by the Allied powers.

After the war, the Nationalist government of China recognized the strategic value of the Ryukyu Islands and proposed a joint trusteeship with the United States for a period of five to ten years. Later proposals included allowing the U.S. to establish bases on some islands, indicating a willingness to compromise and an understanding that the U.S. would not readily transfer sovereignty to China. Chinese domestic opinion was divided: some called for an independent Ryukyuan state, others demanded the full incorporation of the Ryukyus into Chinese territory. Most emphasized the islands' strategic importance as a buffer zone and argued they should not fall into the hands of another power.

In 1946, the United States Department of State advocated for the return of the Ryukyus to Japan, citing anti-expansion principles and concerns over economic burdens. In contrast, the U.S. military proposed that the islands be designated as a "strategic trust territory," with Okinawa Island declared a "strategic area." Military leaders argued that the high cost of American lives during the Battle of Okinawa justified permanent military governance as compensation for their sacrifice. After internal debate, the plan was formalized in SWNCC 59 / 1, which proposed placing Okinawa under U.S. military administration rather than returning it to Japan, using trusteeship arrangements to sidestep sovereignty issues. The directives SCAPIN-677 and SCAPIN-841 established the legal and administrative basis for U.S. jurisdiction south of the 29th parallel north, forming the framework for postwar American control.

=== U.S. administration (1945–1972) ===
On April 1, 1945, the U.S. Army and Marine Corps launched an invasion of Okinawa with approximately 185,000 troops. They encountered determined and intense resistance from the Japanese defenders, but the U.S. emerged victorious on June 22. During the fighting, approximately one-third of Okinawa's civilian population lost their lives. The dead, of all nationalities, are commemorated at the Cornerstone of Peace.

During the battle of Okinawa, U.S. fleet admiral Chester Nimitz had issued an order on 5 April 1945, declaring the suspension of the Japanese administration in Okinawa and the establishment of the United States Military Government of the Ryukyu Islands (USMGR). The United States Civil Administration of the Ryukyu Islands was later established in 1950 to replace the USMGR, and the U.S. administration of Okinawa was later formalized in 1952, when the Treaty of San Francisco came into effect.

==== Continued U.S. military buildup ====
During the Korean War, B-29 Superfortresses flew bombing missions over Korea from Kadena Air Base on Okinawa. The military buildup on the island during the Cold War increased a division between local inhabitants and the American military. Under the 1952 Treaty of Mutual Cooperation and Security between the United States and Japan, United States Forces Japan (USFJ) have maintained a large military presence.

During the mid-1950s, the U.S. seized land from Okinawans to build new bases or expand currently existing ones. According to the Melvin Price Report, by 1955, the military had displaced 250,000 residents.

==== Secret U.S. deployment of nuclear weapons ====
Since 1960, the U.S. and Japan have maintained an agreement that allows the U.S. to secretly bring nuclear weapons into Japanese ports. The Japanese people tended to oppose the introduction of nuclear arms into Japanese territory; the Japanese government's assertion of Japan's non-nuclear policy and a statement of the Three Non-Nuclear Principles reflected this popular opposition. Most of the weapons were alleged to be stored in ammunition bunkers at Kadena Air Base. Between 1954 and 1972, 19 different types of nuclear weapons were deployed in Okinawa, but with fewer than around 1,000 warheads at any one time. In fall 1960, U.S. commandos in Green Light Teams secret training missions carried small nuclear weapons on the east coast of Okinawa Island.

==== Vietnam War ====
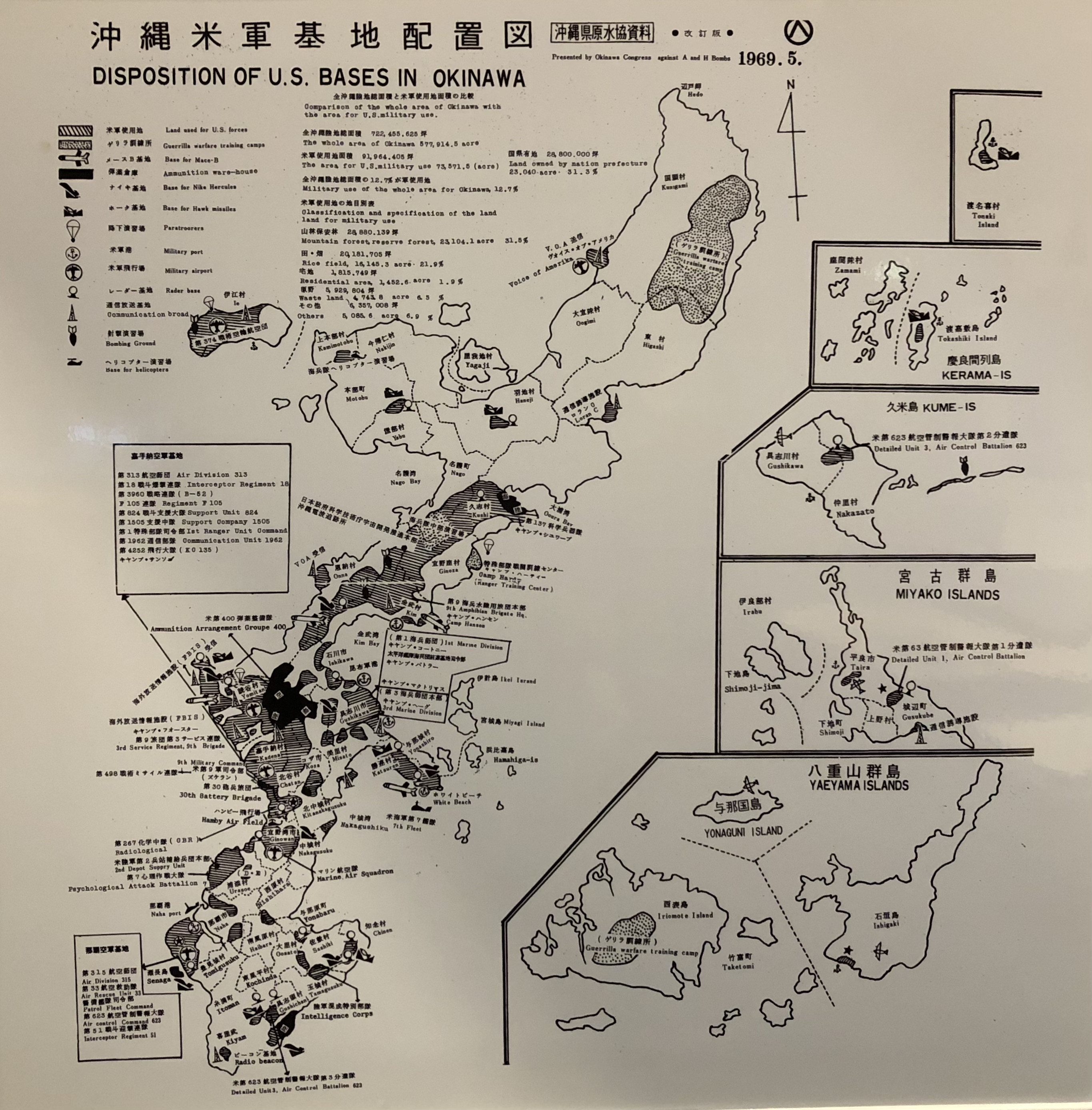
Map of U.S. military bases on Okinawa Island in 1969

Between 1965 and 1972, Okinawa was a key staging point for United States in its military operations directed towards North Vietnam. Along with Guam, it presented a geographically strategic launch pad for covert bombing missions over Cambodia and Laos. Anti-Vietnam War sentiment became linked politically to the movement for reversion of Okinawa to Japan. In 1965, the U.S. military bases, earlier viewed as paternal post war protection, were increasingly seen as aggressive. The Vietnam War highlighted the differences between United States and Okinawa but showed a commonality between the islands and mainland Japan.

As controversy grew regarding the alleged placement of nuclear weapons on Okinawa, fears intensified over the escalation of the Vietnam War. Okinawa was perceived by some inside Japan as a potential target for China, should the communist government feel threatened by United States. American military secrecy blocked any local reporting on what was actually occurring at bases such as Kadena Air Base. As information leaked out, and images of air strikes were published, the local population began to fear the potential for retaliation.

Political leaders such as Makoto Oda, a major figure in the Beheiren movement (Foundation of Citizens for Peace in Vietnam), believed that the return of Okinawa to Japan would lead to the removal of U.S. forces, ending Japan's involvement in Vietnam. In a speech delivered in 1967, Oda was critical of Prime Minister Eisaku Satō's unilateral support of America's war in Vietnam, claiming "Realistically we are all guilty of complicity in the Vietnam War". The Beheiren became a more visible anti-war movement on Okinawa as the American involvement in Vietnam intensified. The movement employed tactics ranging from demonstrations to handing leaflets to soldiers, sailors, airmen and Marines directly, warning of the implications for a third World War.

The U.S. military bases on Okinawa became a focal point for anti-Vietnam War sentiment. By 1969, over 50,000 American military personnel were stationed on Okinawa. United States Department of Defense began referring to Okinawa as the "Keystone of the Pacific". This slogan was imprinted on local U.S. military license plates.

In 1969, chemicals leaked from the U.S. storage depot at Chibana in central Okinawa, under Operation Red Hat. Evacuations of residents took place over a wide area for two months. Even two years later, government investigators found that Okinawans and the environment near the leak were still suffering because of the depot.

On May 15, 1972, the U.S. government returned the islands to Japan following the signing of the 1971 Okinawa Reversion Agreement.

=== Post-reversion history (1972–present) ===
U.S. military facilities on Okinawa Island (in red)

The U.S. Marine Corps buried a massive stockpile of Agent Orange at the Futenma air station in Okinawa, seriously sickening the base's former head of maintenance and potentially contaminating nearby residents and the ground beneath the base. The barrels were abandoned in Okinawa at the end of the Vietnam War – when the U.S. government banned the dioxin-laden defoliant for health reasons — and were buried at the installation in the city of Ginowan after the Pentagon ignored repeated requests to safely dispose of them, according to the veterans who served at the installation in the 1970s and 1980s. The 1995 kidnaping, beating, and rape of a 12-year-old girl by three U.S. servicemen triggered widespread protests in Okinawa. Reports by the local media of accidents and crimes committed by U.S. servicemen have reduced the local population's support for the U.S. military bases. A strong emotional response has emerged from certain incidents.

Documents declassified in 1997 proved that both tactical and strategic weapons have been maintained in Okinawa. In 1999 and 2002, the Japan Times and the Okinawa Times reported speculation that not all weapons were removed from Okinawa. On October 25, 2005, after a decade of negotiations, the governments of the U.S. and Japan officially agreed to move Marine Corps Air Station Futenma from its location in the densely populated city of Ginowan to the more northerly and remote Camp Schwab in Nago by building a heliport with a shorter runway, partly on Camp Schwab land and partly running into the sea. The move is partly an attempt to relieve tensions between the people of Okinawa and the Marine Corps.

Despite Okinawa prefecture constituting only 0.6% of Japan's land surface, in 2006 75% of all USFJ bases were located on Okinawa, occupying 18% of the main island.

In a poll conducted by The Asahi Shimbun in May 2010, 43% of the Okinawan population wanted the complete closure of the U.S. bases, 42% wanted reduction, and 11% wanted to maintain the status quo. Okinawan feelings about the U.S. military are complex.

In early 2008, U.S. Secretary of State Condoleezza Rice apologized after a series of crimes involving American troops in Japan, including the rape of a young girl of 14 by a Marine on Okinawa. The U.S. military imposed a temporary 24-hour curfew on military personnel and their families to ease the anger of local residents. Some cited statistics that the crime rate of military personnel is consistently less than that of the general Okinawan population. However, some criticized the statistics as unreliable, since violence against women is under-reported. Between 1972 and 2009, U.S. servicemen committed 5,634 criminal offenses, including 25 murders, 385 burglaries, 25 arsons, 127 rapes, 306 assaults and 2,827 thefts. Yet, per Marine Corps Installations Pacific data, U.S. service members are convicted of far fewer crimes than local Okinawans.

In 2009, a new Japanese government came to power and froze the U.S. forces relocation plan but in April 2010 indicated their interest in resolving the issue by proposing a modified plan. A study done in 2010 found that the prolonged exposure to aircraft noise around the Kadena Air Base and other military bases cause health issues such as a disrupted sleep pattern, high blood pressure, weakening of the immune system in children, and a loss of hearing.

In 2011, it was reported that the U.S. military—contrary to repeated denials by The Pentagon—had kept tens of thousands of barrels of Agent Orange on the island. The Japanese and American governments have angered some U.S. veterans, who believe they were poisoned by Agent Orange while serving on the island, by characterizing their statements regarding Agent Orange as "dubious", and ignoring their requests for compensation. Reports that more than a third of the barrels developed leaks have led Okinawans to ask for environmental investigations, but as of 2012 both Tokyo and Washington refused such action. Jon Mitchell has reported concern that the U.S. used American Marines as chemical-agent guinea pigs.

On September 30, 2018, Denny Tamaki was elected as the next governor of Okinawa prefecture, after a campaign focused on sharply reducing the U.S. military presence on the island.

==== Marine Corps Air Station Futenma relocation ====
In 2006, some 8,000 U.S. Marines were removed from the island and relocated to Guam. The move to Marine Corps Base Camp Blaz was expected to be completed in 2023 but as of January 1, 2025, is still in process. Japan paid for a majority of the cost to construct the new base. The U.S. still maintains Air Force, Marine, Navy, and Army military installations on the islands. These bases include Kadena Air Base, Camp Foster, Marine Corps Air Station Futenma, Camp Hansen, Camp Schwab, Torii Station, Camp Kinser, and Camp Gonsalves. The area of 14 U.S. bases are 233 square kilometres (90 sq mi), occupying 18% of the main island. Okinawa hosts about two-thirds of the 50,000 American forces in Japan although the islands account for less than one percent of total lands in Japan.

Suburbs have grown towards and now surround two historic major bases, Futenma and Kadena. A sizable portion of the land used by the U.S. military is Camp Gonsalves in the north of the island. On December 21, 2016, 10,000 acres of Camp Gonsalves were returned to Japan. On June 25, 2018, Okinawa residents held a protest demonstration at sea against scheduled land reclamation work for the relocation of a U.S. military base within Japan's southernmost island prefecture. A protest gathered hundreds of people.

Since the early 2000s, Okinawans have opposed the presence of American troops helipads in the Takae zone of the Yanbaru forest near Higashi and Kunigami. This opposition grew in July 2016 after the construction of six new helipads.

== Geography ==
=== Major islands ===
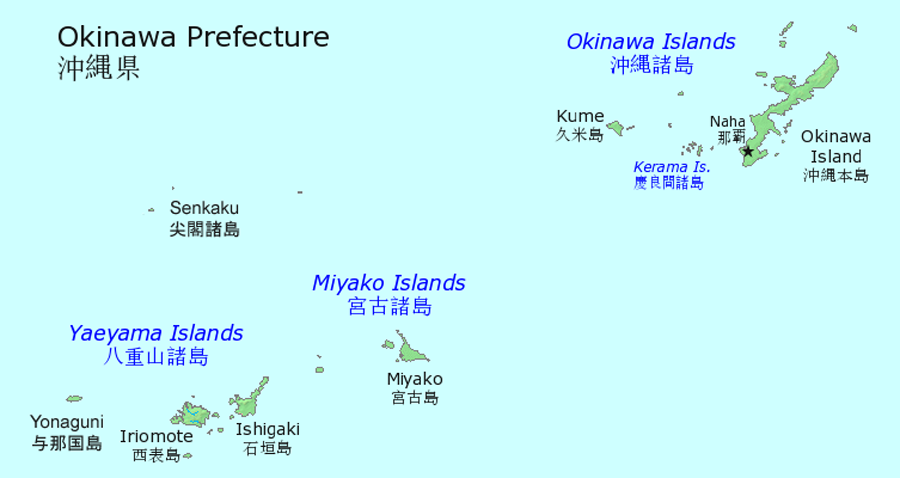
The islands of Okinawa Prefecture

The islands comprising the prefecture are the southern two thirds of the archipelago of the Ryūkyū Islands (琉球諸島, Ryūkyū-shotō). Okinawa's inhabited islands are typically divided into three geographical archipelagos. From northeast to southwest:

- Okinawa Islands (沖縄諸島, Okinawa-shotō)
  - Iejima (伊江島, Iejima)
  - Kume-jima (久米島町, Kumejima-chō)
  - Okinawa Island (沖縄島, Okinawa-jima)
  - Kerama Islands (慶良間諸島, Kerama-shotō)
- Miyako Islands (宮古列島, Miyako-rettō)
  - Miyako-jima (宮古島, Miyako-jima)
- Yaeyama Islands (八重山列島, Yaeyama-rettō)
  - Iriomote Island (西表島, Iriomote-jima)
  - Ishigaki Island (石垣島, Ishigaki-jima)
  - Yonaguni (与那国島, Yonaguni-jima)
- Senkaku Islands (尖閣諸島, Senkaku-shotō)
- Daitō Islands (大東諸島, Daitō-shotō)
  - Minamidaitōjima (南大東島, Minami-Daitō)
  - Kitadaitōjima (北大東島, Kita-Daitō)
  - Okidaitōjima (沖大東島, Oki-Daitō)

=== Natural parks ===
Approximately 36% percent of the total land area of the prefecture was designated as natural parks, namely the Iriomote-Ishigaki, Kerama Shotō, and Yambaru National Parks; Okinawa Kaigan and Okinawa Senseki Quasi-National Parks; and Irabu, Kumejima, Tarama, and Tonaki Prefectural Natural Parks. The natural parks of Okinawa Prefecture were established to protect the region's tropical landscapes, including coastlines, coral reefs, forests, and island ecosystems.

=== Ecology ===
The dugong is an endangered marine mammal related to the manatee. Iriomote is home to one of the world's rarest and most endangered cat species, the Iriomote cat. The region is also home to at least one endemic pit viper, Trimeresurus elegans. The islands of Okinawa are surrounded by some of the most abundant coral reefs found in the world. The world's largest colony of rare blue coral is found off Ishigaki Island. The sea turtles return yearly to the southern islands of Okinawa to lay their eggs. The summer months carry warnings to swimmers regarding venomous jellyfish and other dangerous sea creatures.

Okinawa is a major producer of sugar cane, pineapple, papaya, and other tropical fruit, and the Southeast Botanical Gardens represent tropical plant species.

=== Geology ===
The island is largely composed of coral, and rainwater filtering through that coral has given the island many caves, which played an important role in the Battle of Okinawa. Gyokusendo is an extensive limestone cave in the southern part of Okinawa's main island. Nuchishinji-gama (Cave Okinawa) served as a place of refuge during the Battle of Okinawa from American troops.

=== Climate ===
The island experiences temperatures above 20 °C (68 °F) for most of the year. The climate of the islands ranges from humid subtropical climate (Köppen climate classification Cfa) in the north, such as Okinawa Island, to tropical rainforest climate (Köppen climate classification Af) in the south such as Iriomote Island. Snowfall is unheard of at sea level. However, on January 24, 2016, sleet was reported in Nago for the first time on record.

== Politics ==
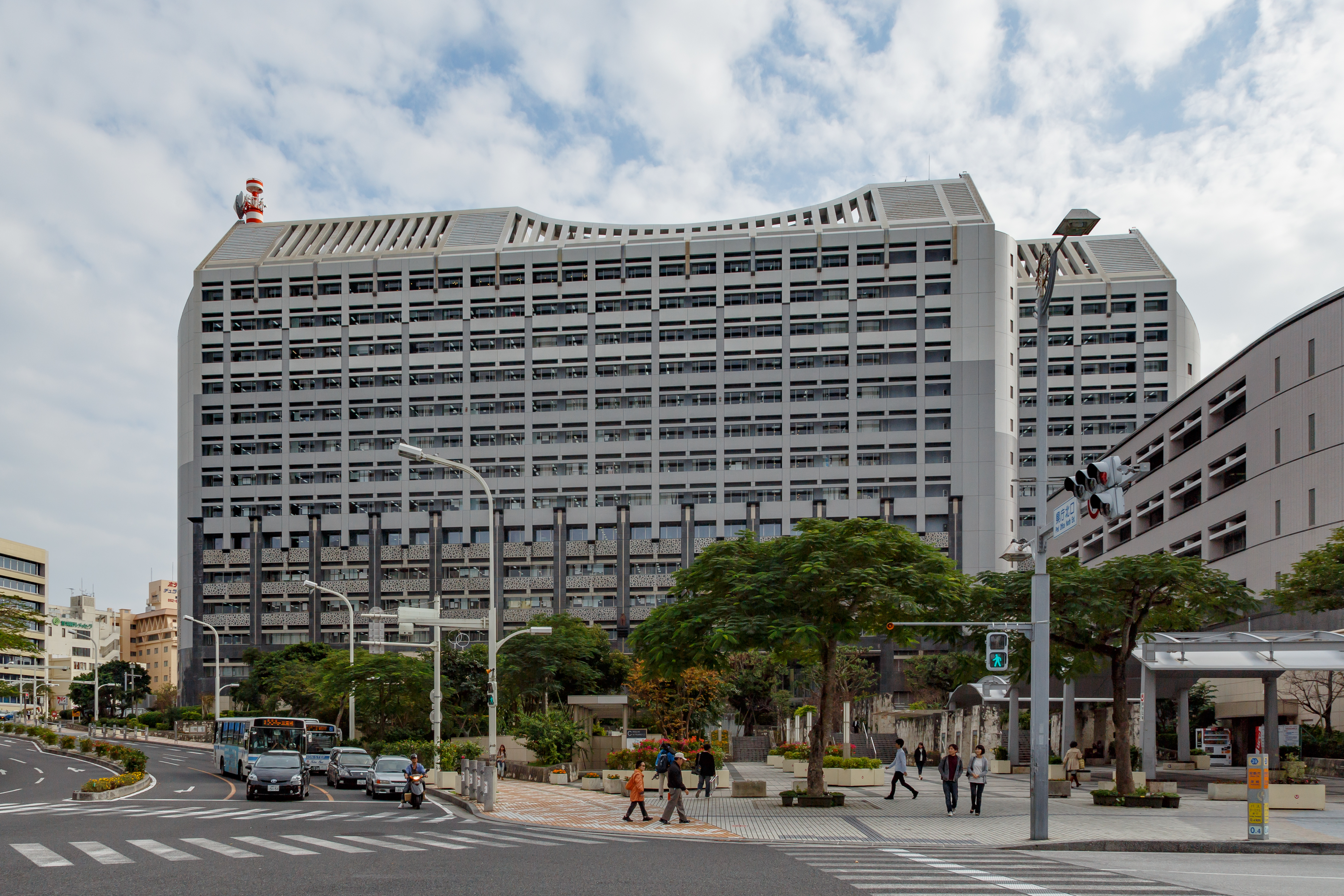
Okinawa Prefectural Government Headquarters

Due to its unique historical background, Okinawa has a significantly stronger progressive (left-wing) presence compared to most other Japanese prefectures; this makes it one of the most politically polarized regions in the country. The Okinawa Social Mass Party, a local progressive political party, has played an important role in postwar Okinawan politics.

In 2014, various progressive parties such as the Social Democratic Party, Japanese Communist Party, Democratic Party, and the Okinawa Social Mass Party formed a cross-party electoral alliance with some conservative figures who also opposed the relocation of the U.S. Marine Corps Air Station Futenma to the city of Nago. This movement, known as the "All-Okinawa" campaign, achieved electoral victories in the 2014 Okinawa gubernatorial election, the 2016 Okinawa prefectural election, and others.

Since Japan introduced the Single-member district system in 1996, Okinawa has been divided into four electoral districts for the House of Representatives. Among these, Okinawa's 2nd District, which hosts the highest concentration of U.S. military bases, has long been a stronghold for the progressive camp. Kantoku Teruya of the Social Democratic Party held this seat from 2003 onwards. The other three districts have seen fierce competition between conservatives and progressives, with frequent changes in party control.

In the 2014 Japanese general election, all four Okinawan districts elected candidates opposed to the relocation of the Futenma base to Nago. In the 1st District, Seiken Akamine of the Japanese Communist Party won a seat—marking the JCP's first single-member district victory in Okinawa and its first nationwide in 18 years.

In the 2017 Japanese general election, the Liberal Democratic Party (LDP) won the seat in the 4th District. In the 2021 Japanese general election, LDP candidates won in both the 3rd and 4th Districts and also gained proportional representation seats in the 1st and 2nd Districts. The Japanese Communist Party and the Social Democratic Party each retained one seat. In the 2026 Japanese general election, the LDP won a seat in each of Okinawa's four districts.

In the House of Councillors, Okinawa is represented by two seats in a single at-large district. Both are currently held by politicians who oppose the Futenma base relocation. However, in proportional representation voting, the LDP has consistently received the highest number of votes in Okinawa.

Okinawa has also experienced multiple changes in political leadership throughout its gubernatorial history. In 2014, Takeshi Onaga, backed by progressive forces, was elected governor of Okinawa Prefecture. After Onaga's death in 2018, another progressive candidate, Denny Tamaki, was elected governor in the September 2018 election. Tamaki was re-elected in 2022. However, in recent years, rising tensions across the Taiwan Strait have led to growing unease among Okinawans toward the People's Republic of China, resulting in a loss of momentum for progressive forces.

The Okinawa Prefectural Assembly consists of 48 members, with the Liberal Democratic Party holding the largest number of seats at 22.

In terms of administrative jurisdiction, the disputed Senkaku Islands (referred to by China and Taiwan as the Diaoyu Islands) are administered by the city of Ishigaki in Okinawa Prefecture.

Okinawa has long experienced social and cultural frictions with mainland Japan. In 2016, controversy erupted when police officers from Osaka Prefecture assigned to duty at U.S. military bases in Okinawa used the derogatory term "dojin" (meaning "savage" or "native") to insult local protestors. According to a 2017 NHK survey, only 19% of Okinawans felt that people from mainland Japan understood Okinawan sentiments, while 79.6% believed they did not. Additionally, 56.9% reported an increase in discriminatory or derogatory remarks against Okinawans over the past five years. On the other hand, instances of discrimination against Amerasians (children of mixed Okinawan and American parentage) have also been reported within Okinawa.

Okinawa faces chronic fiscal challenges and relies heavily on subsidies from Japan's central government. Its fiscal capacity index is only 0.29—significantly below the national average.

=== U.S. military bases ===
U.S. military bases in Okinawa in red

While Okinawa comprises only 0.6% of Japan's land area, it hosts approximately 74% of all U.S. military facilities in the country. The 33 American bases in Okinawa occupy around 10% of the prefecture's land—up to 18% on Okinawa Island. Approximately 47,300 U.S. military personnel and their families reside in the prefecture.

Among the many military issues, the relocation of Marine Corps Air Station Futenma has been the most contentious. Due to its proximity to residential areas and repeated accidents, Futenma has been labeled one of the most dangerous military bases in the world. The prefectural government has long called for its relocation outside of Okinawa. In 2010, Japan and the U.S. agreed to relocate the base to Camp Schwab in Nago, sparking widespread protests.

Another key issue is crime involving U.S. military personnel. Between the 1972 reversion and 2015, 5,896 criminal cases involving U.S. forces were reported in Okinawa. In 2016, a high-profile rape and murder case involving a U.S. military contractor in Uruma triggered mass protests.

On the other hand, U.S. bases are Okinawa's second-largest source of employment.

According to a 2017 NHK survey, 25.7% of Okinawans wanted the complete removal of U.S. military bases, while 50.6% preferred reducing their presence to levels comparable to mainland Japan. Only 26.5% supported relocating Futenma to Nago, while 62.6% were opposed.

On February 24, 2019, a prefectural referendum was held on land reclamation in Henoko for the new U.S. base. With a turnout of 52.48%, 71.74% opposed the project, 18.99% supported it, and 8.70% expressed no clear opinion.

=== Independence movement ===
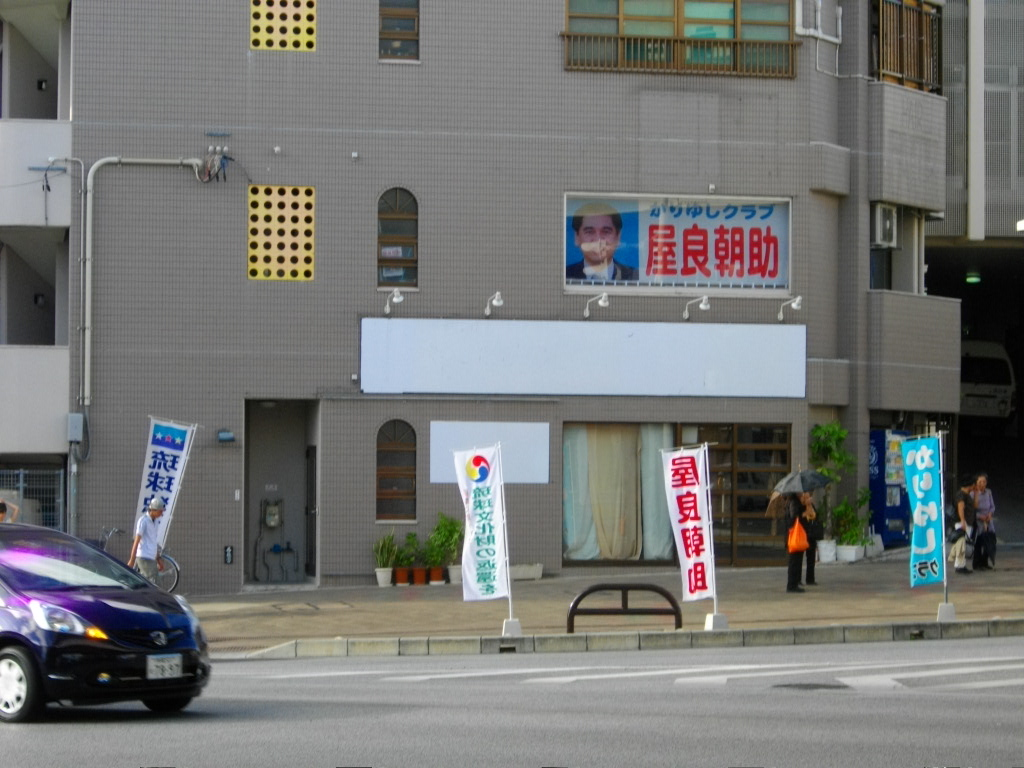
Headquarters of the Kariyushi Club, a group advocating for Ryukyuan independence.

After Japan annexed the Ryukyu Kingdom in 1879 during the so-called Ryukyu Disposition, the last king, Shō Tai, was relocated to Tokyo. In the following years, Ryukyuan figures who opposed the new arrangements petitioned the Qing dynasty for redress, organizing in treaty-port communities such as Fuzhou, Beijing, and Tianjin. Contemporary sources referred to some émigrés as dasshinnin (脱清人), who advocated Qing intervention to restore Ryukyuan autonomy or statehood. Diplomatic mediation was even sought from former U.S. President Ulysses S. Grant in 1879–1880, but negotiations ultimately failed to produce a settlement; the issue receded after the First Sino-Japanese War.

Following World War II, the Ryukyu Islands were placed under U.S. administration (1945–1972). During this period, proposals ranging from restoration of Ryukyuan statehood to enhanced local self-government were debated among Okinawan actors and in Japanese civil society. Under the 1971 Okinawa Reversion Agreement, administrative rights returned to Japan in 1972 while U.S. bases remained under the Treaty of Mutual Cooperation and Security between the United States and Japan.

In contemporary politics, independence advocacy persists alongside broader autonomy movements and base-related activism. Polling generally shows limited support for full independence but greater backing for stronger local autonomy; for example, a 2022 Okinawa Times survey reported 3% support for independence, 48% for a "strongly empowered" local government, and 42% for maintaining the status quo. Public debate has increasingly extended to digital platforms; Japanese media and academic outlets have reported instances of inauthentic social-media activity linked to foreign information operations concerning Okinawa and independence narratives.

== Municipalities ==
=== Cities ===
Administrative map of Okinawa Prefecture City Town Village

Eleven cities are located within the Okinawa Prefecture:

Name					Area (km^{2})	Population	Map
Rōmaji	Kanji	Okinawan		other languages [script] (name in brackets)	Area (km^{2})	Population	Map
Rōmaji	Kanji	Kana	Rōmaji	other languages [script] (name in brackets)	Area (km^{2})	Population	Map
Ginowan	宜野湾市	じのーん	Jinōn		19.51	94,405	
Ishigaki	石垣市	いしがち	ʔIshigaci	Isïgaksï, Ishanagzï (Yaeyama)	229	47,562	
Itoman	糸満市	いちゅまん	ʔIcuman		46.63	59,605	
Miyakojima	宮古島市	なーく、みゃーく	Nāku, Myāku	Myaaku (Miyakoan)	204.54	54,908	
Nago	名護市	なぐ	Nagu	Naguu [ナグー] (Kunigami)	210.37	61,659	
Naha (capital)	那覇市	な	Nafa		39.98	317,405	
Nanjō	南城市	ーぐく	Fēgusiku		49.69	41,305	
Okinawa	沖縄市	うちなー	ʔUcinā		49	138,431	
Tomigusuku	豊見城市	みぐく	Timigusiku		19.6	61,613	
Urasoe	浦添市	うらー	ʔUrasī		19.09	113,992	
Uruma	うるま市	うるま	ʔUruma		86	118,330	

=== Towns and villages ===
These are the towns and villages in each district:

Name					Area (km^{2})	Population	District	Type	Map
Rōmaji	Kanji	Okinawan		other languages [script] (name in brackets)	Area (km^{2})	Population	District	Type	Map
Rōmaji	Kanji	Kana	Rōmaji	other languages [script] (name in brackets)	Area (km^{2})	Population	District	Type	Map
Aguni	粟国村	あぐに	ʔAguni		7.63	772	Shimajiri District	Village	
Chatan	北谷町	ちゃたん	Catan		13.62	28,578	Nakagami District	Town	
Ginoza	宜野座村	じぬざ	Jinuza		31.28	5,544	Kunigami District	Village	
Haebaru	南風原町	ーばる	Fēbaru		10.72	37,874	Shimajiri District	Town	
Higashi	東村	がし	Figashi	Agaarijimaa [アガーリジマー] (Kunigami)	81.79	1,683	Kunigami District	Village	
Ie	伊江村	いい	ʔIi	Ii [イー] (Kunigami)	22.75	4,192	Kunigami District	Village	
Iheya	伊平屋村	いひゃ、後地	ʔIhya, Kushijī		21.72	1,214	Shimajiri District	Village	
Izena	伊是名村	いじな、前地	ʔIjina, Mējī		15.42	1,518	Shimajiri District	Village	
Kadena	嘉手納町	かなー	Kadinā		15.04	13,671	Nakagami District	Town	
Kin	金武町	ちん	Cin	Chin [チン] (Kunigami)	37.57	11,259	Kunigami District	Town	
Kitadaitō	北大東村	うふあがりじま	ʔUhuʔagarijima		13.1	615	Shimajiri District	Village	
Kitanakagusuku	北中城村	にしなかーぐく	Nishinakāgusiku		11.53	16,040	Nakagami District	Village	
Kumejima	久米島町	くみじま	Kumijima		63.5	7,647	Shimajiri District	Town	
Kunigami	国頭村	くんじゃん	Kunjan	Kunzan (Kunigami)	194.8	4,908	Kunigami District	Village	
Minamidaitō	南大東村	ーうふあがりじま	Hwēʔuhuʔagarijima		30.57	1,418	Shimajiri District	Village	
Motobu	本部町	むぶ	Mutubu	Mutubu (Kunigami)	54.3	13,441	Kunigami District	Town	
Nakagusuku	中城村	なかーぐく	Nakāgusiku		15.46	20,030	Nakagami District	Village	
Nakijin	今帰仁村	なちじん	Nacijin	Nachizin (Kunigami)	39.87	9,529	Kunigami District	Village	
Nishihara	西原町	にしばる	Nishibaru		15.84	34,463	Nakagami District	Town	
Ōgimi	大宜味村	じみ	Ujimi	Uujimii (Kunigami)	63.12	3,024	Kunigami District	Village	
Onna	恩納村	うんな	ʔUnna	Unna (Kunigami)	50.77	10,443	Kunigami District	Village	
Tarama	多良間村	たらま	Tarama	Tarama (Miyakoan)	21.91	1,194	Miyako District	Village	
Taketomi	竹富町	だきん	Dakidun	Teedun (Yaeyama)	334.02	4,050	Yaeyama District	Town	
Tokashiki	渡嘉敷村	かしち	Tukashici		19.18	697	Shimajiri District	Village	
Tonaki	渡名喜村	なち	Tunaci		3.74	406	Shimajiri District	Village	
Yaese	八重瀬町	え゙ー	Ēsi		26.9	29,488	Shimajiri District	Town	
Yomitan	読谷村	んたん	Yuntan		35.17	40,517	Nakagami District	Village	
Yonabaru	与那原町	なばる	Yunabaru		5.18	18,410	Shimajiri District	Town	
Yonaguni	与那国町	なぐに	Yunaguni	Dunan, Juni (Yonaguni) Yunoon (Yaeyama)	28.95	2,048	Yaeyama District	Town	
Zamami	座間味村	ざまみ	Zamami		16.74	924	Shimajiri District	Village	

== Demographics ==
Okinawa prefecture population pyramid in 2020

=== Ethnic groups ===
The indigenous Ryukyuans make up the majority of Okinawa Prefecture's population and are also the main ethnic group of the Amami Islands to the north. Large Okinawan diaspora communities persist in places such as South America and Hawaii. With the introduction of American military bases, there are an increasing number of half-American children in Okinawa, including prefecture governor Denny Tamaki. The prefecture also has a sizable minority of Yamato people from mainland Japan; exact population numbers are difficult to establish, as the Japanese government does not officially recognize Ryukyuans as a distinct ethnic group from Yamatos.

The overall ethnic identity of Okinawa residents is rather split. According to a telephone poll conducted by Lim John Chuan-tiong (林泉忠), an associate professor with the University of the Ryukyus, 40.6% of respondents identified as "沖縄人 (Okinawan)", 21.3% identified as "日本人 (Japanese)" and 36.5% identified as both.

=== Population ===
Okinawa prefecture age pyramid as of 1 October 2003
(per thousands of people)

Age	People
0–4	84
5–9	85
10–14	87
15–19	94
20–24	91
25–29	97
30–34	99
35–39	87
40–44	91
45–49	96
50–54	100
55–59	64
60–64	65
65–69	66
70–74	53
75–79	37
80 +	55

Okinawa Prefecture age pyramid, divided by sex, as of 1 October 2003
(per thousands of people)

Males	Age	Females
43	0–4	41
44	5–9	41
45	10–14	42
48	15–19	46
46	20–24	45
49	25–29	48
49	30–34	50
43	35–39	44
46	40–44	45
49	45–49	47
52	50–54	48
32	55–59	32
32	60–64	33
32	65–69	34
24	70–74	29
14	75–79	23
17	80 +	38

Per Japanese census data, Okinawa prefecture has had continuous positive population growth since 1960. However, in the 21st century, growth has slowed, with a decline expected to begin by 2030 as East Asia's population ages quickly. The 2025 Census recorded Okinawa's population as 1,468,220, a modest increase of 740 from 2020.

Historical population
Year	Pop.	±%
1873	166,789	—
1920	572,000	+242.9%
1930	578,000	+1.0%
1940	575,000	−0.5%
1950	915,000	+59.1%
1960	883,000	−3.5%
1970	945,000	+7.0%
1980	1,107,000	+17.1%
1990	1,222,000	+10.4%
2000	1,318,220	+7.9%
2010	1,392,818	+5.7%
2020	1,467,480	+5.4%

== Language ==
There remain six Ryukyuan languages, which, although part of the same Japonic language family, are mutually unintelligible with Japanese. One of the Ryukyuan languages is spoken in Kagoshima Prefecture, rather than in Okinawa Prefecture. These languages are in decline as the younger generation of Okinawans uses Standard Japanese. Mainland Japanese and some Okinawans generally perceive the Ryukyuan languages as dialects. Standard Japanese is almost always used in formal situations. In informal situations, the everyday language among Okinawans under the age of 60 is Okinawan Japanese, which is often mistaken by non-Okinawans as the Okinawan language proper. The actual traditional Okinawan language is still used in traditional cultural activities, such as folk music and folk dance. There is a radio-news program in the language as well.

== Culture ==
Okinawan culture retains strong influences from its historical trading partners. Among these, Kyushu has maintained the closest economic and cultural ties with Okinawa from ancient times to the present, and the two regions share many cultural traits. Elements of Okinawan culture can be found throughout Kyushu, and vice versa. For instance, Okinawan musical scales appear in Kyushu's folk songs, and there are notable similarities in cuisine and language. Kyushu is also home to a traditional instrument called the gottan(ゴッタン), which closely resembles the Okinawan sanshin (三線).

Furthermore, the customs of the Okinawan islands show strong influences from China, Thailand, and Austronesian-speaking regions.

One of the most famous cultural traditions of Okinawa is undoubtedly karate. Karate is a martial art that originated when Chinese kung fu was introduced to the Ryukyu Kingdom and then developed independently within the islands before being brought to mainland Japan. Today, karate is practiced around the world in various styles, including Shotokan, Goju-ryu, Shito-ryu, and Uechi-ryu.

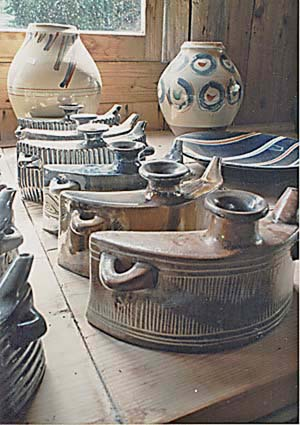
Awamori pots

A cultural feature of the Okinawans is the forming of moais. A moai is a community social gathering and groups that come together to provide financial and emotional support through emotional bonding, advice giving, and social funding. This provides a sense of security for the community members and as mentioned in the Blue Zone studies, may have been a contributing factor to the longevity of its people. However, in recent decades Okinawans' life expectancy has fallen significantly (also bringing into question the general validity of the 'Blue Zones' denomination), which often has been blamed on cultural influence from the rest of Japan, as well as foreign influences on Okinawans' lifestyle.

Two Okinawan writers have received the Akutagawa Prize: Eiki Matayoshi in 1995 for The Pig's Retribution (豚の報い, Buta no mukui) and Shun Medoruma in 1997 for A Drop of Water (Suiteki). The prize was also won by Okinawans in 1967 by Tatsuhiro Oshiro for Cocktail Party (Kakuteru Pāti) and in 1971 by Mineo Higashi for Okinawan Boy (Okinawa no Shōnen).

A traditional craft, the fabric named bingata, is made in workshops on the main island and elsewhere.

=== Music ===
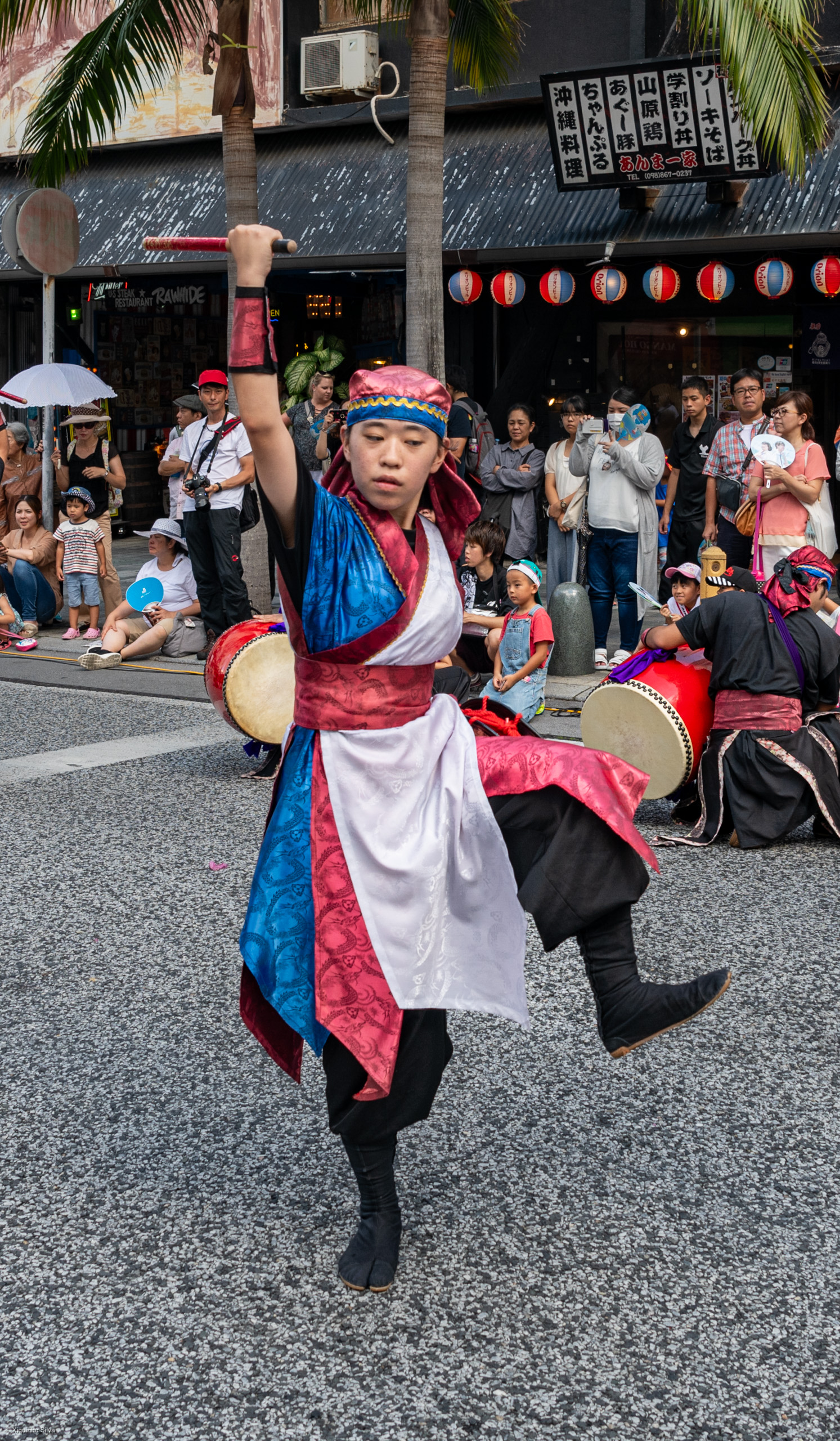
Eisa performer in Naha, Okinawa

The music of the prefecture contains native and imported influences in both koten (classical) and min'yō (folk) styles. Okinawan instruments include the sanshin—a three-stringed banjo-like instrument, closely related to the Chinese sanxian, and ancestor of the Japanese shamisen. Its body is often bound with snakeskin (from pythons, imported from elsewhere in Asia, rather than from Okinawa's venomous habu, which are too small for this purpose). Okinawan musical cultures integrate dance with music, such as in eisa, a traditional drumming dance.

=== Religion ===
Okinawan people have inherited a traditional religious belief system known as Ryukyuan Shinto, which is similar to but distinct from modern Japanese Shinto. This indigenous belief system is animistic in nature, characterized by ancestor worship and a deep respect for the relationships between the living, the dead, and the gods or spirits of the natural world.

Shamanic practitioners, known as Yuta, continue to play an active role in Okinawan society. They perform ritual prayers, divination, spiritual consultations, and even communicate with the spirits of the deceased. For many people, yuta serve as important spiritual guides who offer advice and solutions to both supernatural and everyday life problems.

Throughout Okinawa, there are sacred sites known as utaki, where rituals and ceremonies are performed. Ryukyuan beliefs preserve many elements of ancient Japanese spirituality—such as those from the Jōmon and Yayoi periods—which have largely disappeared on the Japanese mainland. As such, they are considered important resources in comparative mythology and religious studies.

=== Cuisine and diet ===
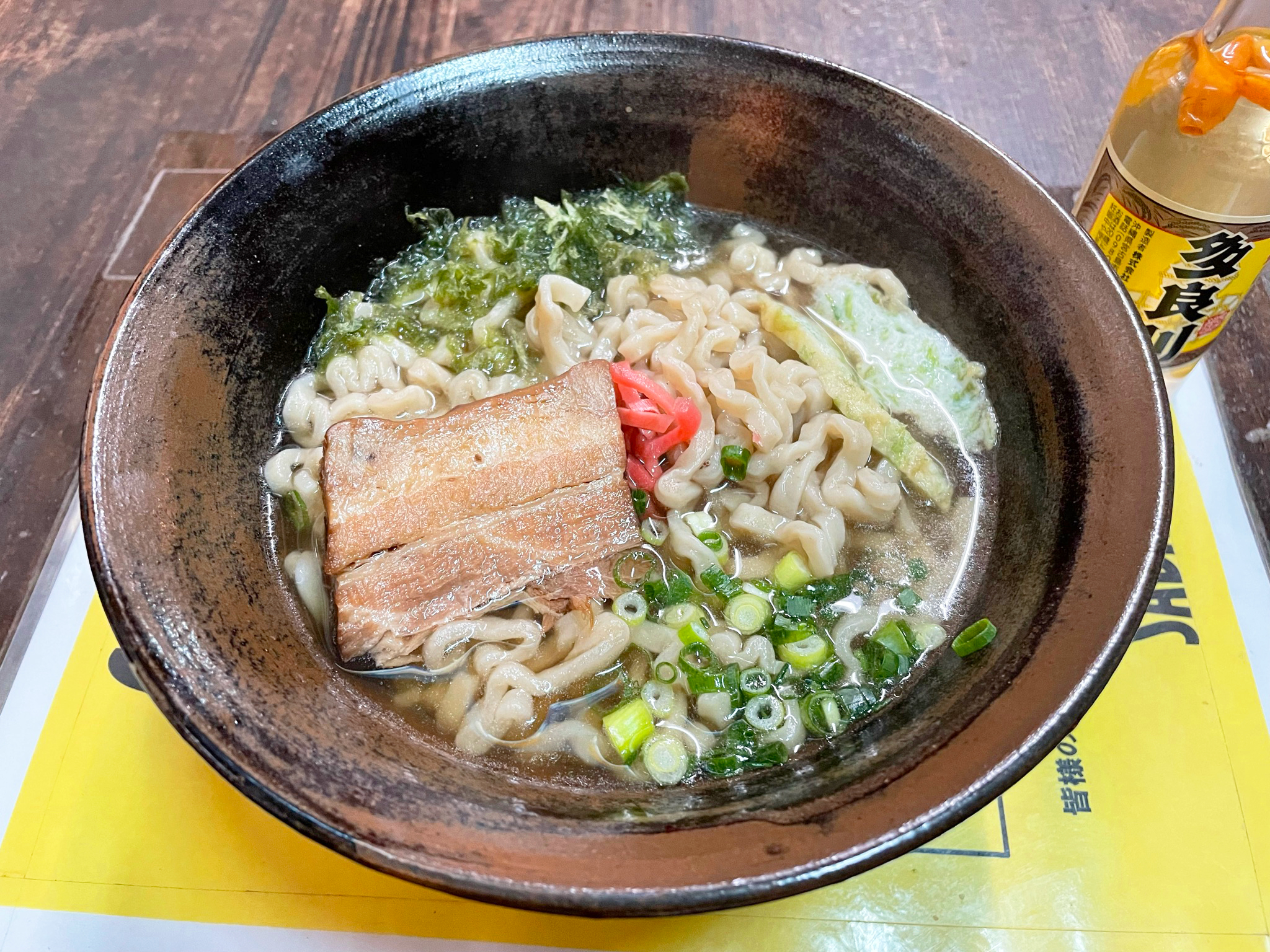
Okinawa soba

The Okinawan diet consists of low-fat, low-salt foods, such as whole fruits and vegetables, legumes, tofu, and seaweed. Okinawans are particularly well known for consuming purple potatoes, also known as Okinawan sweet potatoes. Okinawans used to be known for their longevity compared to the rest of Japan and the world in general. This particular island is a so-called Blue Zone, an area where people are purported to live longer than most others elsewhere in the world. Possible explanations for this were diet, low-stress lifestyle, caring community, activity, and spirituality of the inhabitants of the island.

A traditional Okinawan product that owes its existence to Okinawa's trading history is awamori—an Okinawan distilled spirit made from indica rice imported from Thailand.

=== Architecture ===
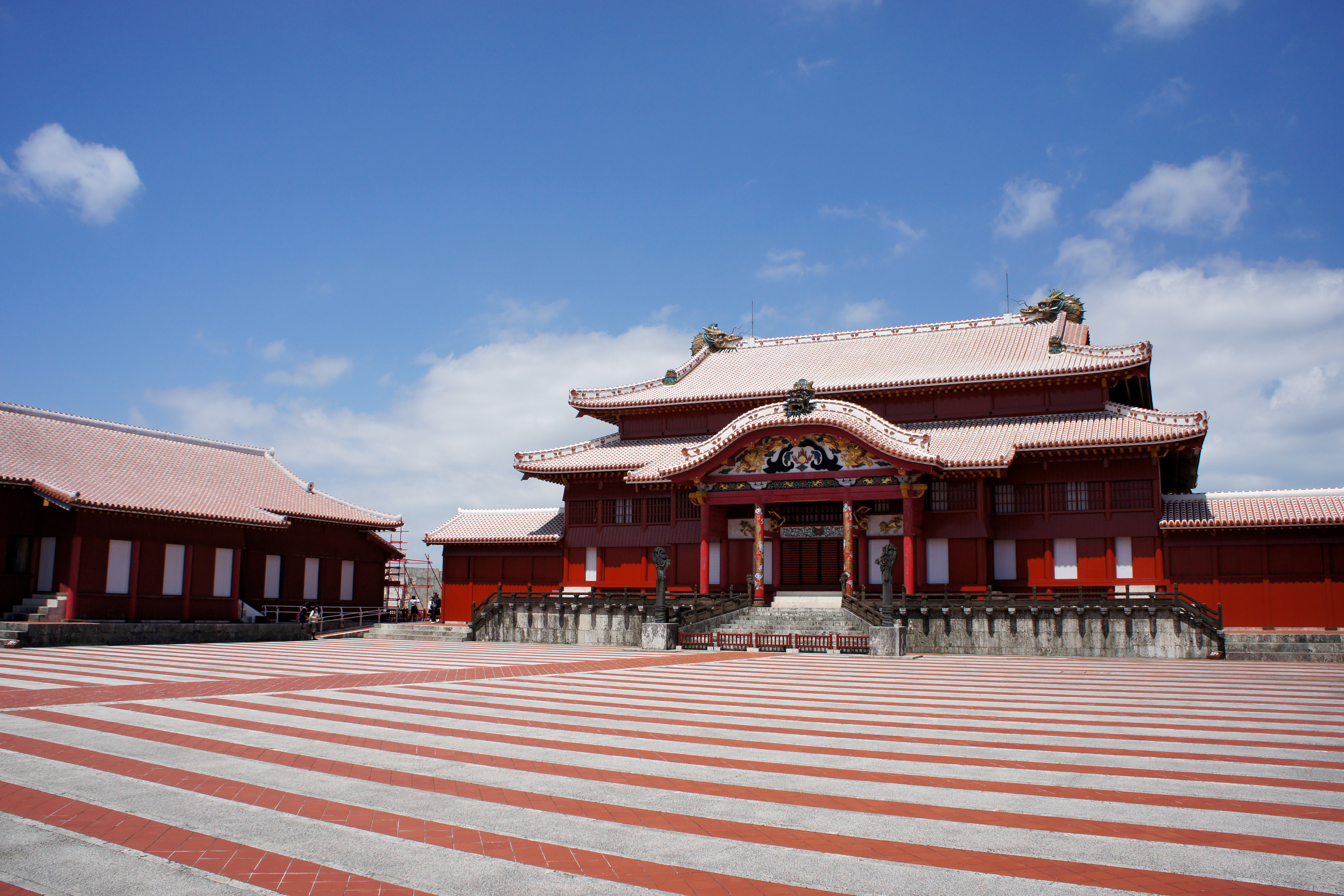
Shuri Castle in Naha

Despite widespread destruction during World War II, there are many remains of a unique type of castle or fortress known as gusuku; the most significant are inscribed on the UNESCO World Heritage List (Gusuku Sites and Related Properties of the Kingdom of Ryukyu). In addition, twenty-three Ryukyuan architectural complexes and forty historic sites have been designated for protection by the national government. Shuri Castle in Naha is a UNESCO World Heritage Site.

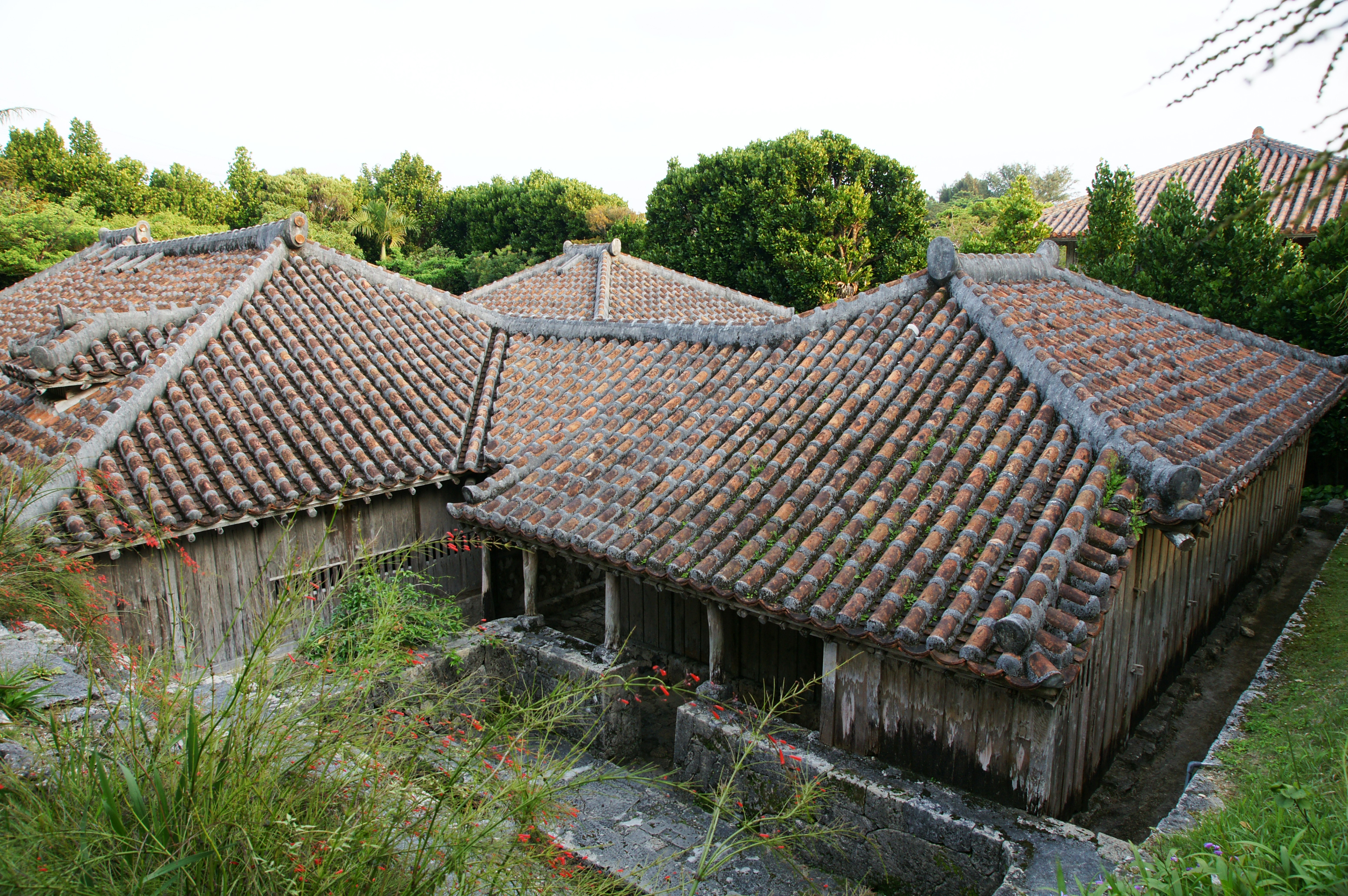
Nakamura House

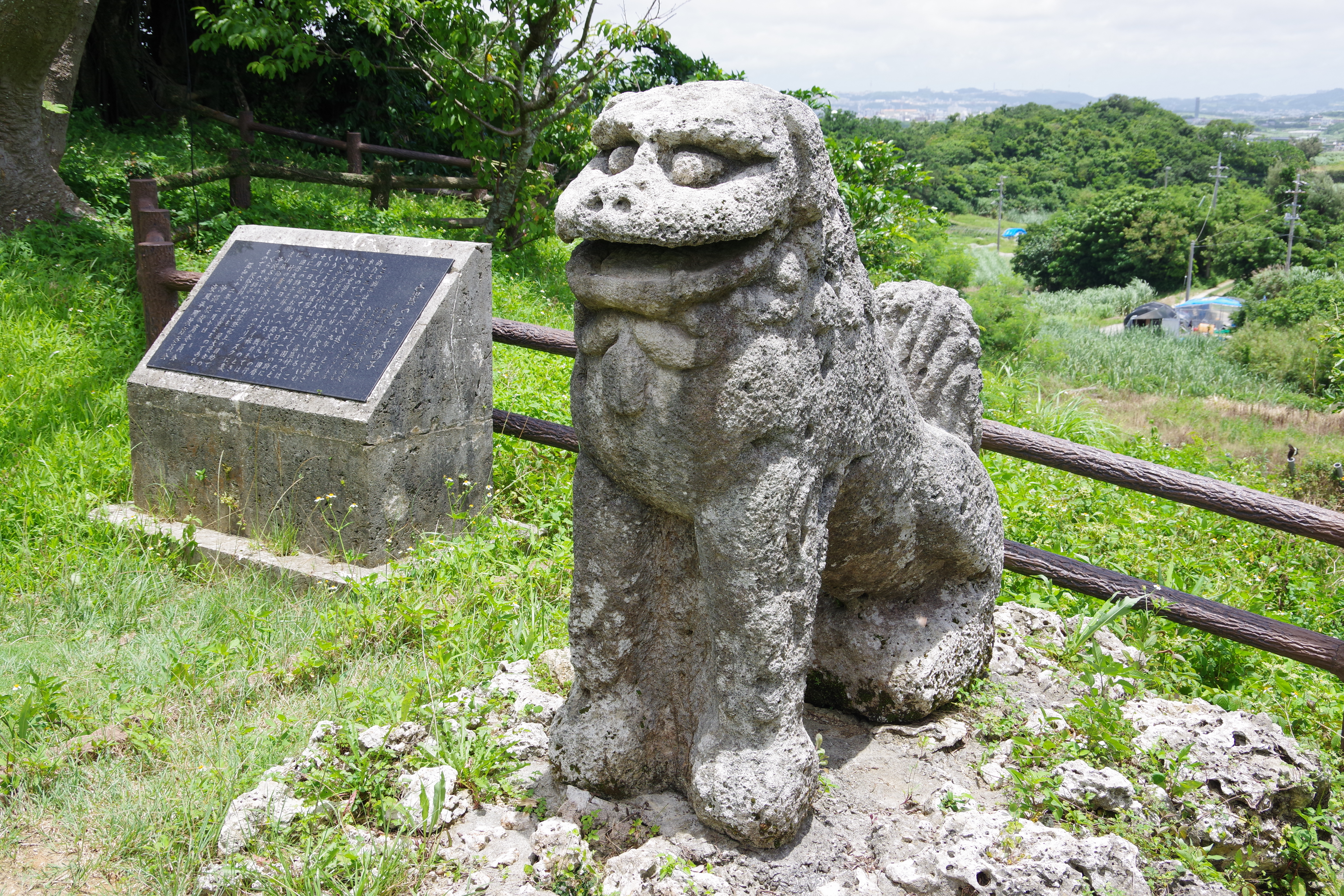
A shisa

Whereas most homes in Japan are made from wood and allow free-flow of air to combat humidity, typical modern homes in Okinawa are made from concrete with barred windows to protect from flying plant debris and to withstand regular typhoons. Roofs are designed with strong winds in mind, in which each tile is cemented on and not merely layered as seen with many homes in Japan. The Nakamura House (中村家住宅 (沖縄県)) is an original 18th century farmhouse in Kitanakagusuki. Many roofs also display a lion-dog statue, called a shisa, which is said to protect the home from danger. Roofs are typically red in color and are inspired by Chinese design.

== Education ==
The public schools in Okinawa are overseen by the Okinawa Prefectural Board of Education. The agency directly operates several public high schools including Okinawa Shogaku High School. The U.S. Department of Defense Dependents Schools operates 13 schools total in Okinawa. Seven of these schools are located on Kadena Air Base.

Okinawa has many types of private schools. Some of them are cram schools, also known as juku. Others, such as Nova, solely teach language. There are 10 colleges / universities in Okinawa, including the University of the Ryukyus, the only national university in the prefecture, and the Okinawa Institute of Science and Technology, a new international research institute. Okinawa's American military bases also host the Asian Division of the University of Maryland University College.

== Sports ==
=== Martial arts ===
Martial arts, such as tegumi and Okinawan kobudō originated among the indigenous people of Okinawa Island. Due to its central location, Okinawa was influenced by various cultures including Japan, China and Southeast Asia in its martial arts culture.

==== Karate ====
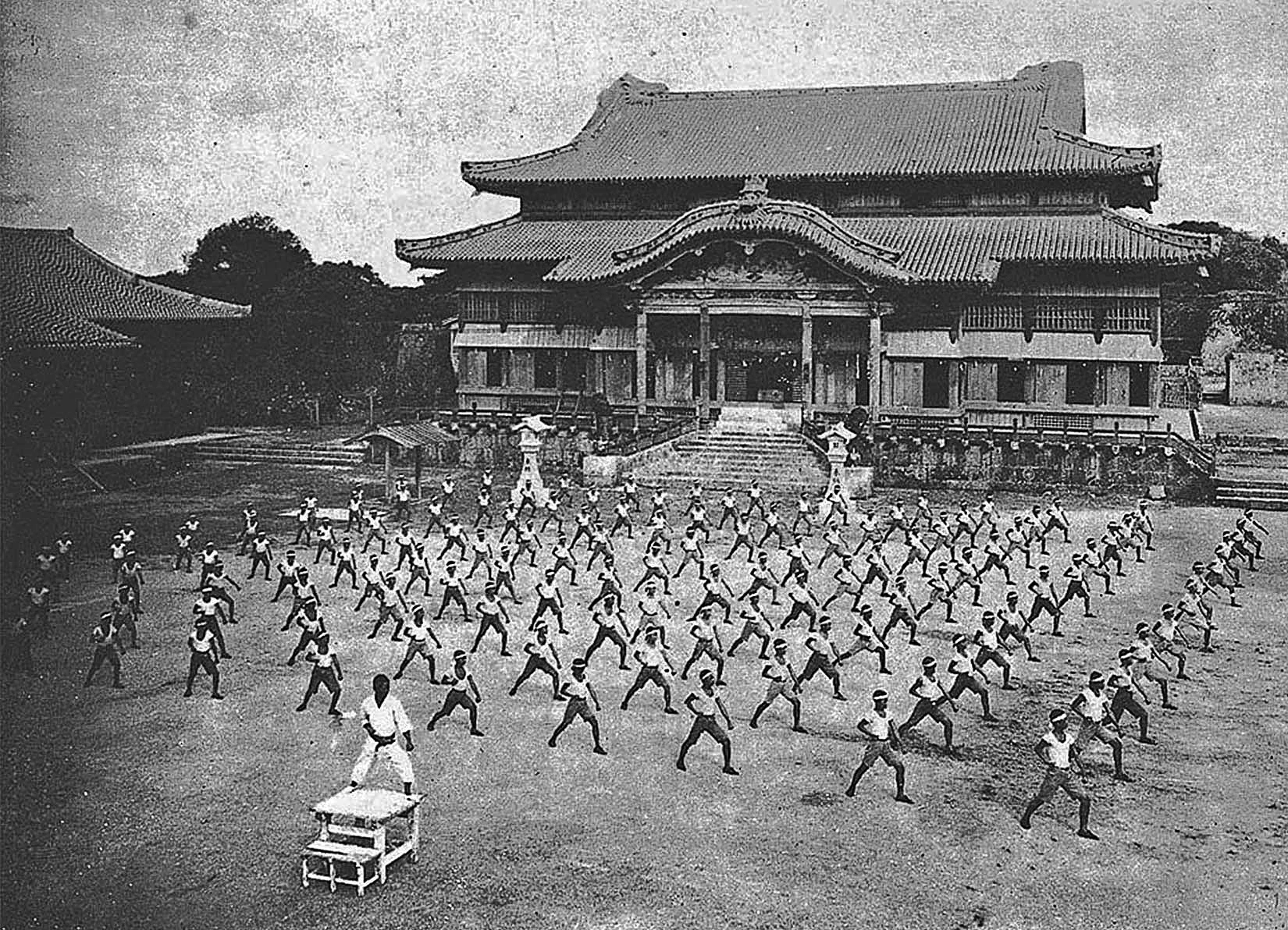
Karate training with Shinpan Gusukuma at Shuri Castle, c. 1938

Karate originated in the Ryukyu Kingdom, under Chinese influence. Over time, it developed into several styles and sub-styles. On Okinawa, the three main styles are considered to be Shōrin-ryū, Gōjū-ryū and Uechi-ryū. Internationally, the various styles and sub-styles include Matsubayashi-ryū, Wadō-ryū, Isshin-ryū, Shōrinkan, Shotokan, Shitō-ryū, Shōrinjiryū Kenkōkan, Shorinjiryu Koshinkai, and Shōrinji-ryū.

Following Okinawa's occupation, karate spread to the United States and the rest of the world. It is now popular across the world, and has since been included in the Olympic Games.

=== Association football ===
FC Ryukyu is a professional football team based on Okinawa. Since 2014 they have competed in the second or third tier in the national league system.

=== Basketball ===
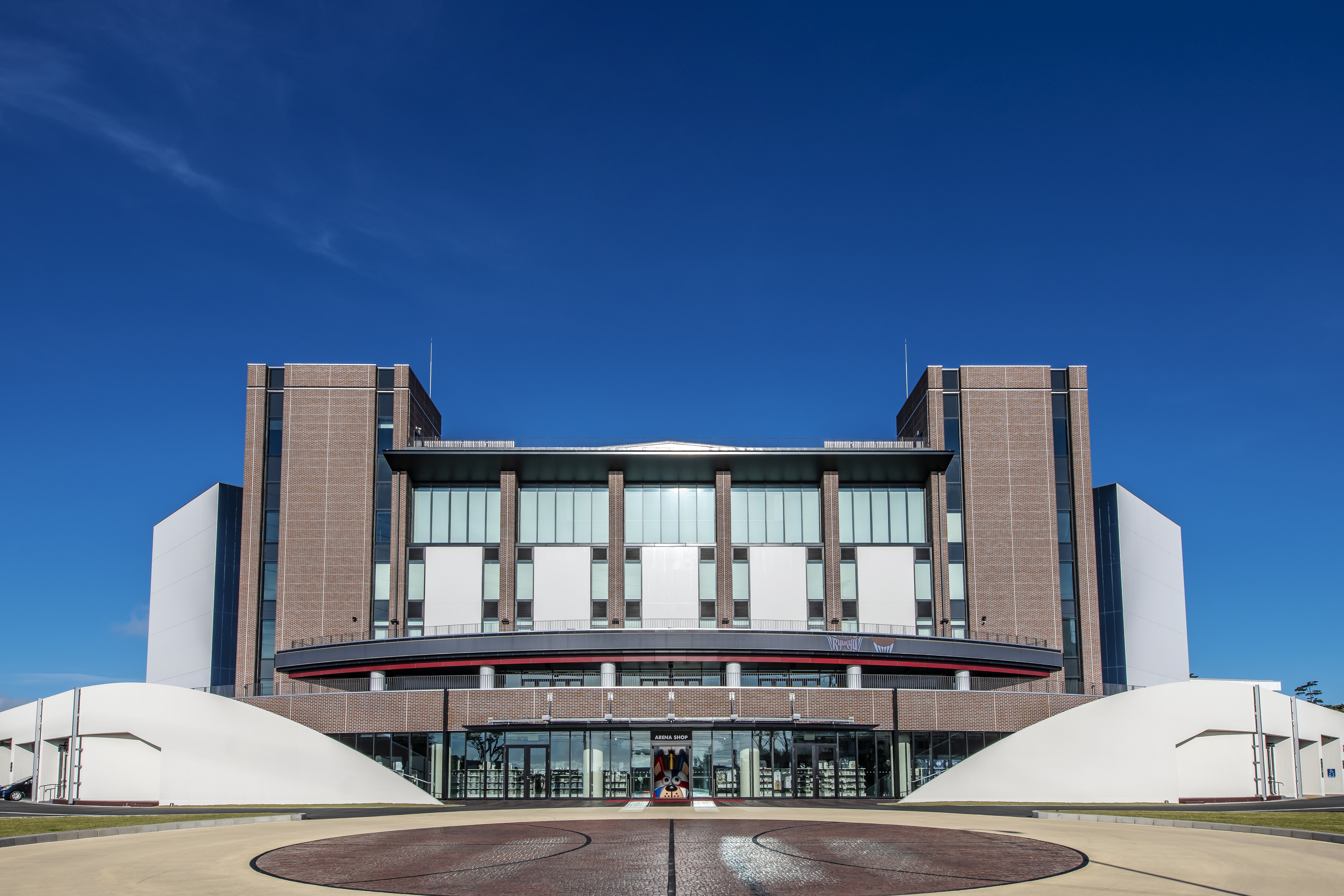
Okinawa Arena, the home arena of the B.League team Ryukyu Golden Kings

The Ryukyu Golden Kings are a professional basketball team that compete in the B.League, the top-tier professional basketball league of Japan. They are successful, having won the national title five times (most recently in 2023).

The Okinawa Arena has hosted the Japanese men's basketball team for various 2023 FIBA Basketball World Cup Asian qualifiers. It was also one of five venues to host the 2023 FIBA Basketball World Cup, the other four were in the Philippines and Indonesia.

=== Harii ===
Harii (ハーリー) is a traditional rowing sport practiced mainly in Kyushu and Okinawa, Japan.

It is typically held during events such as the Kaijin-sai (海神祭) around the 4th day of the 5th month of the lunar calendar (ユッカヌヒー), or near the lunar Obon season.

The sport features a boat race in which dozens of men board a harii boat and row competitively; the team that reaches the finish line first is declared the winner.

Various harii races are held throughout Okinawa, with the most prominent being the Naha Harii in the city of Naha.

=== Handball ===
- Ryukyu Corazon (Naha)

=== Baseball ===
In 2019, BASE Okinawa Baseball Club attempted forming the first-ever professional baseball team on Okinawa, the Ryukyu Blue Oceans. The team was expected to be fully organized by January 2020 with a view to joining the Nippon Professional Baseball league.

However, complications arising from the COVID-19 pandemic compounded with allegations of financial mismanagement – including reports of unpaid wages to players – resulted in the project being put on hold in November 2022. An exodus of players and staff followed, resulting in management company BASE officially filing for bankruptcy on April 6, 2023.

Despite the lack of a local team, various professional baseball teams hold winter training camps in Okinawa as it is the warmest prefecture of Japan, with no snow and higher average temperatures than other prefectures. In 2025, ten teams held such camps across the prefecture, including two teams from the KBO League.

- Yomiuri Giants
- Hanshin Tigers
- Yokohama DeNA BayStars
- Hiroshima Toyo Carp
- Tokyo Yakult Swallows
- Chunichi Dragons
- Hokkaido Nippon-Ham Fighters
- Chiba Lotte Marines
- Samsung Lions (Korea)
- Doosan Bears (Korea)

=== Golf ===
There are numerous golf courses in the prefecture, and there was formerly a professional tournament called the Okinawa Open.

== Transportation ==
=== Air transportation ===
- Aguni Airport
- Hateruma Airport
- Iejima Airport
- Kerama Airport
- Kitadaito Airport
- Kumejima Airport
- Minami-Daito Airport
- Miyako Airport
- Naha Airport
- New Ishigaki Airport
- Shimojishima Airport
- Tarama Airport
- Yonaguni Airport

=== Highways ===
- Okinawa Expressway
- Naha Airport Expressway
- National Route 58
- National Route 329
- National Route 330
- National Route 331
- National Route 332
- National Route 390
- National Route 449
- National Route 505
- National Route 507

=== Rail ===
- Okinawa Urban Monorail

=== Ports ===
The major ports of Okinawa include:

- Hirara Port
- Port of Ishigaki
- Port of Kinwan
- Nakagusukuwan Port
- Naha Port
- Port of Unten

== Economy ==
The island economy is primarily driven by tourism and the U.S. military presence. Other significant contributors to the economy include public utilities and public works, as well as, to a lesser extent, limestone mining, cement production, agriculture, telecommunications (Okinawa Cellular Telephone), and alcoholic beverage production (Orion Breweries).

The 34 U.S. military installations on Okinawa are financially supported by the U.S. and Japan. The bases provide jobs for Okinawans, both directly and indirectly; in 2011, the U.S. military employed over 9,800 Japanese workers in Okinawa. As of 2012 the bases accounted for up to 5% of the economy. However, Koji Taira argued in 1997 that because the U.S. bases occupy around 20% of Okinawa's land, they impose a deadweight loss of 15% on the Okinawan economy. The Tokyo government also pays the prefectural government around ¥10 billion per year in compensation for the American presence, including, for instance, rent paid by the Japanese government to the Okinawans on whose land American bases are situated. A 2005 report by the U.S. Forces Japan Okinawa Area Field Office estimated that in 2003 the combined U.S. and Japanese base-related spending contributed $1.9 billion to the local economy. On January 13, 2015, in response to the citizens electing governor Takeshi Onaga, the national government announced that Okinawa's funding will be cut, due to the governor's stance on removing the US military bases from Okinawa, which the national government does not want happening.

The Okinawa Convention and Visitors Bureau is exploring the possibility of using facilities on the military bases for large-scale meetings, conferencing, exhibitions events.

== United States military installations ==
- United States Marine Corps
  - Marine Corps Base Camp Smedley D. Butler
    - Camp Courtney
    - Camp Foster
    - Camp Gonsalves (Jungle Warfare Training Center)
    - Camp Hansen
    - Camp Kinser
    - Camp McTureous
    - Camp Schwab
    - Marine Corps Air Station Futenma
- United States Air Force
  - Kadena Air Base
  - Okuma Beach Resort
- United States Navy
  - Camp Lester (Camp Kuwae)
  - Camp Shields
  - Naval Facility White Beach
- United States Army
  - Fort Buckner
  - Naha Military Port
  - Torii Station

== Notable people ==
- Namie Amuro, hip hop and pop singer
- Yui Aragaki, actress, singer and model
- Awich, rapper, singer and songwriter
- Beni, pop and R&B singer
- Zach Bryan, country musician and singer-songwriter
- Michael Carter, National Football League player
- Isamu Chō, officer in the Imperial Japanese Army
- Byron Fija, Okinawan-language educator
- Gichin Funakoshi, martial artist, founder of Shotokan
- Gigō Funakoshi, martial artist
- Gackt, pop rock singer-songwriter, actor and author
- Robert Griffin III, National Football League player, Heisman Trophy winner
- Hearts Grow, alternative rock band
- Takuji Iwasaki, meteorologist, biologist and ethnologist historian
- Eiki Matayoshi, novel writer, winner of Akutagawa prize
- Jin Matsuda, singer, member of INI
- Saori Minami, kayōkyoku pop singer
- Daichi Miura, pop singer, dancer and choreographer
- Chōjun Miyagi, martial artist, founder of Gōjū-ryū
- Yukie Nakama, singer, musician and actress
- Rino Nakasone, professional dancer and choreographer
- Rimi Natsukawa, pop singer
- Ui Nema, VTuber and cultural ambassador for the Okinawa prefectural government
- Orange Range, rock band
- Minoru Ōta, admiral in the Imperial Japanese Navy
- Dave Roberts, Major League Baseball player and manager
- Toshiyuki Sakuda, professional wrestler
- Eisaku Satō, politician, 61st, 62nd and 63rd Prime Minister of Japan
- Aisa Senda, singer, actress and TV presenter in Taiwan
- Ben Shepherd, bassist of Soundgarden
- Stereopony, all-female pop rock band
- Noriyuki Sugasawa, basketball player
- Super Shisa, professional wrestler
- Tina Tamashiro, fashion model and actress
- Yuken Teruya, interdisciplinary artist
- Tamlyn Tomita, actress and singer
- Kanbun Uechi, martial artist, founder of Uechi-ryū
- Mitsuru Ushijima, general at the Battle of Okinawa
- Kentsū Yabu, martial artist prominent in Shōrin-ryū
- Chikako Yamashiro, filmmaker and video artist
- Churanoumi Yoshihisa, sumo wrestler

== See also ==
- Names of Okinawa
- Okinawa Prefectural Assembly
