= Haruko Kato =

Japanese actress (1922–2015)

- 加藤 治子
- Born: 24 November 1922; Akasaka, Minato, Tokyo
- Died: 2 November 2015 (aged 92); Tokyo
- Occupation: Actress
- Years active: 1939-2011
- Spouses: Michio Kato (married 1946 - 1953); Masaya Takahashi (married 1958 - 1973)

Haruko Kato (加藤 治子, Katō Haruko; 24 November 1922 – 2 November 2015) was a Japanese actress.

== Biography ==
Haruko Kato was born in Akasaka, Minato, Tokyo, on 24 November 1922. After training at acting school, she was signed up with the film production company Toho in 1939, debuting in Hanatsumi Nikki in the same year.

She married the playwright Michio Kato in 1946, but he died in 1953. She married actor Masaya Takahashi in 1958, but they divorced in 1973.

Kato died on 2 November 2015 at her home in Tokyo, aged 92.

== Filmography ==
=== Films ===
- Higashi Shinakai (1968)
- Something Like It (1981), Yumi's mother
- Gray Sunset (1985), Kikuyo Takano
- Capone Cries a Lot (1985)
- Gonza the Spearman (1986)
- Tokyo Blackout (1987)
- Umi e, See You (1988), Eiji's mother
- Kiki's Delivery Service (1989), Madame (voice)
- Pistol Opera (2001)
- Fuon (2004)
- Blooming Again (2004)
- Howl's Moving Castle (2004), Madame Suliman (voice)
- Chameleon (2008)
- Still Walking (2008)
- About Her Brother (2010)

=== Television ===
- Ashura no Gotoku (TV series) (1979,1980)
- Ōoku (1983)
- Furuhata Ninzaburō (1996)

=== Dubbing ===
- When the Wind Blows, Hilda Bloggs

== Awards ==
In 2002, Kato was awarded the Order of the Precious Crown.
