= Tarama Prefectural Natural Park =

Natural park in Okinawa, Japan

- 多良間県立自然公園
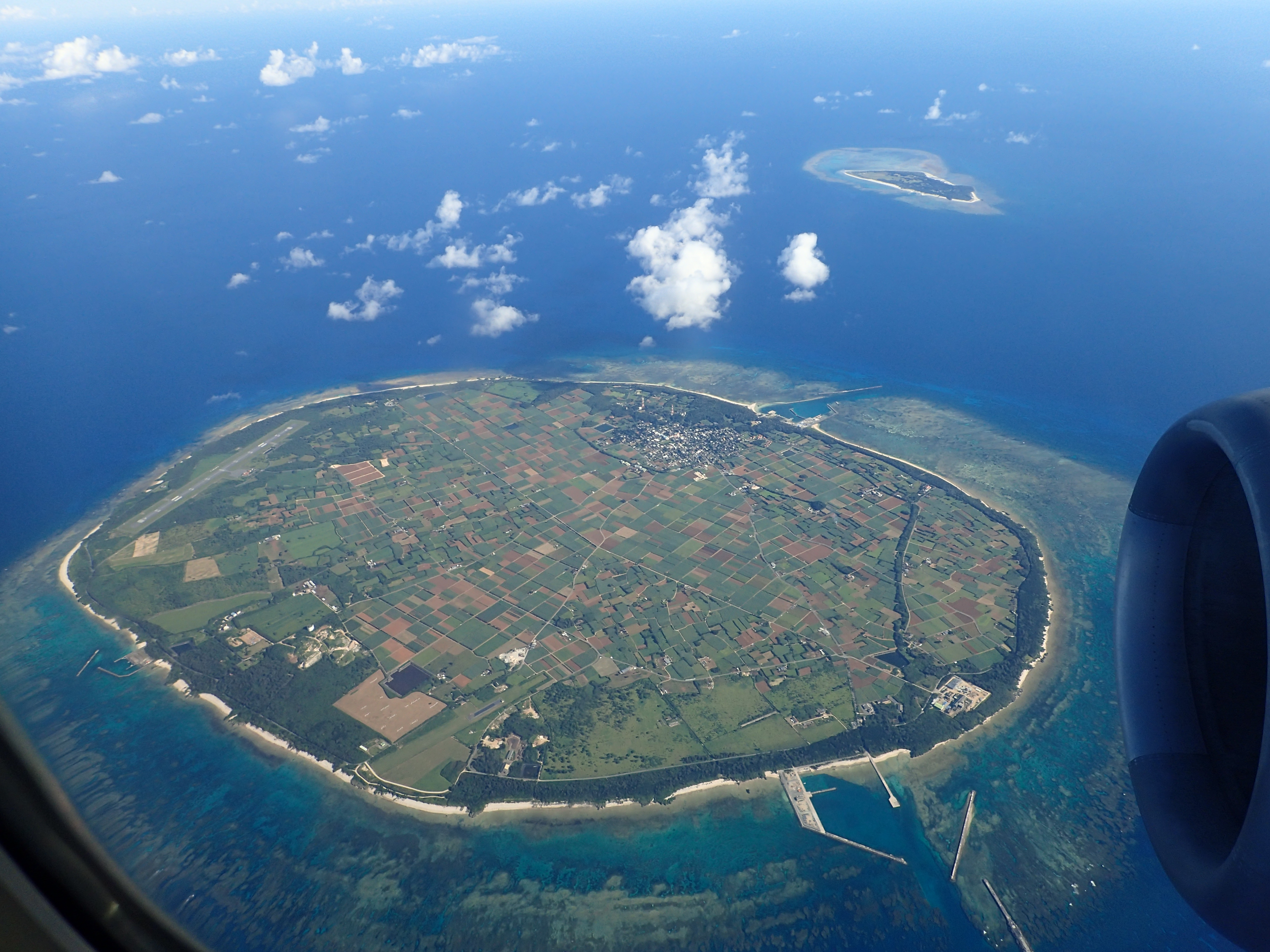
- Islands of Tarama and, in the distance, Minna
- Interactive map of Tarama Prefectural Natural Park
- Location: Okinawa Prefecture, Japan
- Coordinates: 24°39′38″N 124°42′01″E
- Area: 53.00 km^{2} (20.46 sq mi)
- Established: 29 March 2011

Tarama Prefectural Natural Park (多良間県立自然公園, Tarama kenritsu shizen kōen) is a Prefectural Natural Park on and around the islands of Tarama and Minna, in the village of Tarama, Okinawa Prefecture, Japan. The park was established in 2011 and includes a designated marine zone of 31.47 km^{2} (12.15 sq mi).

== See also ==
- National Parks of Japan
- Parks and gardens in Okinawa Prefecture
