= Eiki Matayoshi =

Japanese writer (born 1947)

- 又吉 栄喜
- Born: July 10, 1947 (age 79); Urasoe, Okinawa, United States Ryukyu Island
- Occupation: Writer

Eiki Matayoshi (又吉 栄喜, Matayoshi Eiki; born 15 July 1947) is a contemporary Japanese writer. His novels are always set in the Okinawa archipelago, and he is considered one of the most important contemporary novelists from Okinawa.

One of his earliest novels, Jōji ga shasatsu shita inoshishi (ジョージが射殺した猪 - "The Wild Boar that George Shot"), published in 1978, became very famous for being inspired by a true, controversial story. A soldier of the US occupation forces in Okinawa shot a local man, and during the trial he declared that he mistakenly took him for a wild boar. The US soldier was declared innocent, arousing a big debate among the locals.

Matayoshi became known outside Okinawa thanks to the prestigious Akutagawa Prize, which he won in 1995 for his novel Buta no mukui (豚の報い The Pig's Retribution).

== Selected works ==
- Kānibaru tōgyū taikai (カーニバル闘牛大会 The Carnival Bullfight). 1976. English tr. "The Carnival Bullfight" - posted on 14.10.2009 in "Behold my Swarthy Face" blog ; tr. by Tom Kain);
- Buta no mukui (豚の報い The Pig's Retribution ). 1996. Italian tr.: La punizione del maiale. 2008. Nuoro: Il Maestrale; tr. by Luca Capponcelli and Costantino Pes);
- Kahō wa umi kara (果報は海から Fortunes Comes from the Sea). 1998. English tr.: "Fortunes by the sea", 2000, in Molasky Michael e Rabson Steve, eds. Southern Exposure: Modern Japanese Literature from Okinawa. Honolulu: University of Hawai'i Press; tr. by David Fahy).
- Jinkotsu tenjikan (人骨展示間 Human Bones on Display). 2002. French tr.: Histoire d'un squelette. 2006. Arles: Philippe Picquier; tr. by Patrick Honnoré).

== Movie Adaptations ==
- 1998. Beat (ビート). Filmmaker: Miyamoto Amon (宮本亜門, 1958- ). Screened in 1998, at Venice Film Festival. Original novel: Naminoue no Maria (波の上のマリア - Maria from Naminoue, 1998).
- 1999. Buta no mukui. Filmmaker Sai Yōichi (崔洋一, 1949- ), screened in 1999 at Locarno International Film Festival (wins Don Quixote award). Original novel: Buta no mukui (The Pig's Retribution, 1996).
