= List of junior high schools in Okinawa Prefecture =

== National ==
- Junior High School Affiliated with the School of Education of the University of the Ryukyus

== Municipal ==
=== Okinawa Island ===
==== Naha ====
- Ishida (石田中学校)
- Ishimine (石嶺中学校)
- Jouhoku (城北中学校) - Includes a branch school
- Kagamihara (鏡原中学校)
- Kamihara (神原中学校)
- Kanagusuku (金城中学校)
- Kokura (古蔵中学校)
- Matsushima (松島中学校)
- Matsushiro (松城中学校)
- Mawashi (真和志中学校)
- Naha (那覇中学校)
- Nakaima (仲井真中学校)
- Oroku (小禄中学校)
- Shuri (首里中学校)
- Uenoyama (上山中学校)
- Yasuoka (安岡中学校)
- Yorimiya (寄宮中学校)

==== Nago ====
Nago Junior high school(名護中学校) Yagaji Hirugi Junior high school(屋我地ひるぎ学園小中学校)

==== Chatan ====
- Chatan Junior High School (北谷中学校)
- Kuwae Junior High School (桑江中学校).

==== Ginoza ====
- Ginoza Junior High School (宜野座中学校)

==== Haebaru ====
- Haebaru Junior High School (南風原中学校)
- Nansei Junior High School (南星中学校)

==== Higashi ====
- Higashi Combined Kindergarten, Elementary, and Junior High School (東幼小中学校)

==== Kadena ====
- Kadena Junior High School (嘉手納中学校)

==== Kin ====
- Kin Junior High School (金武中学校)

==== Kitanakagusuku ====
- Kitanakagusuku Junior High School

==== Kunigami ====
- Kunigami Junior High School (国頭中学校).

==== Motobu ====
- Izumi Elementary and Junior High School (伊豆味小中学校)
- Kamimotobu Gakuen (上本部学園) - Kamimotobu Junior High School (上本部中学校)
- Minna Elementary and Junior High School (水納小中学校)
- Motobu Junior High School (本部中学校)

Note:

- Sesoko Elementary School (瀬底小学校) was formerly Sesoko Elementary and Junior High School (瀬底小中学校)

==== Nakagusuku ====
- Nakagusuku Junior High School (中城中学校)

==== Nakijin ====
- Nakijin Junior High School (今帰仁中学校)

==== Nishihara ====
- Nishihara Junior High School (西原中学校)

==== Ogimi ====
- Ogimi Junior High (大宜味中学校)

=== Other islands ===
Aguni

- Aguni Kindergarten, Elementary, and Junior High School

Ie

- Ie Junior High School (伊江中学校)

Iheya

- Iheya Junior High School (伊平屋中学校)

Kitadaito

- Kitadaito Village Kitadaito Elementary-Junior High School (北大東村立北大東小中学校 Kitadaitō Sonritsu Kitadaitō Shōchūgakkō).

Kumejima

- Kumejima Nishi Junior High School (久米島西中学校)
- Kumi Junior High School (球美中学校)

Minamidaito

- Minamidaito Elementary and Junior High School (南大東村立南大東小中学校)

Tarama

- Tarama Junior High School (多良間中学校)

== Foreign government-operated ==
Department of Defense Education Activity (DoDEA), United States:

- Kadena Middle School - Kadena Air Force Base
- Lester Middle School - Camp Lester
- Ryukyu Middle School - Kadena Air Force Base
