= Mount Gusuku =

Mountain on Ie Island near Okinawa, Japan

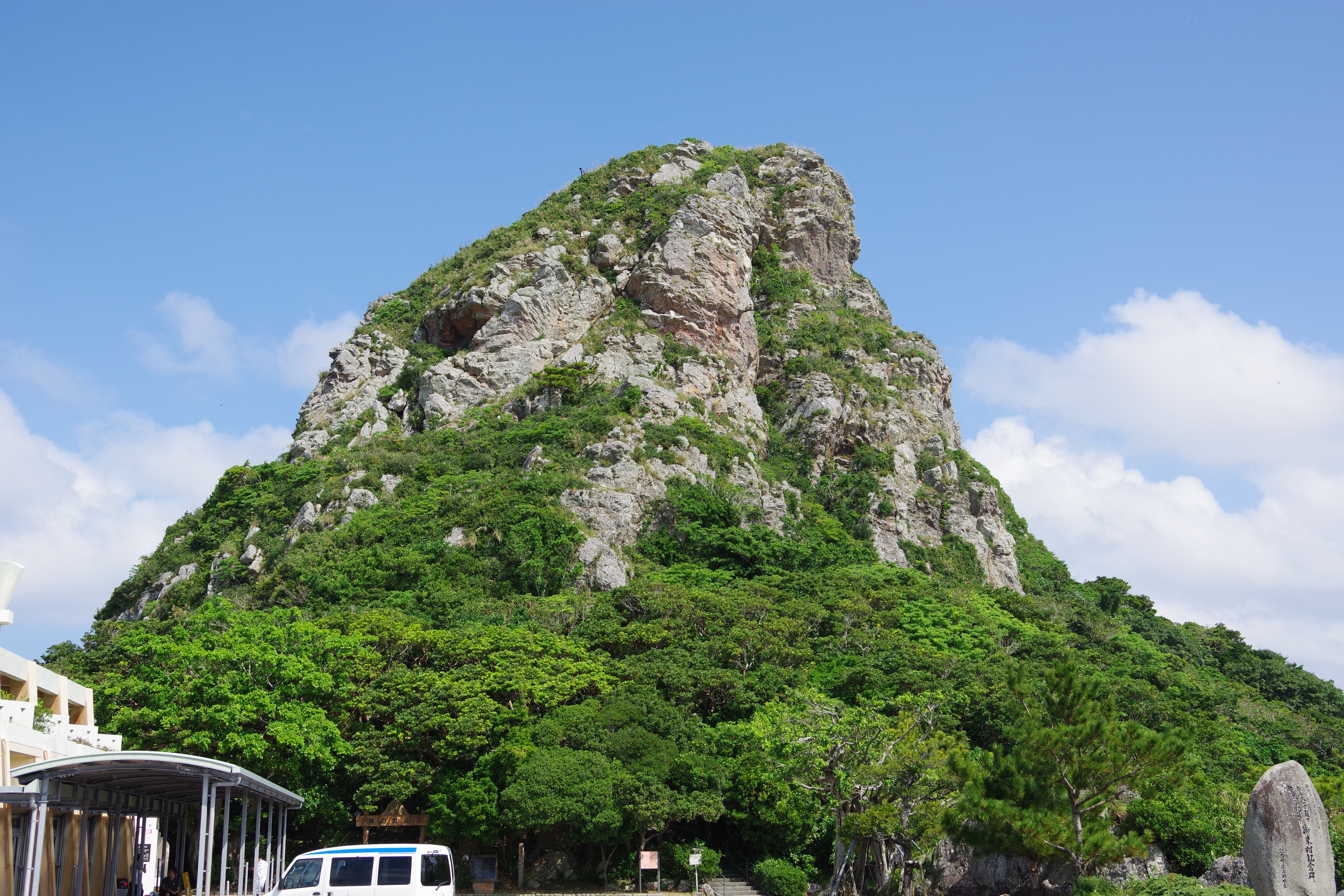

Highest point
- Elevation: 172.2 m (565 ft)
- Prominence: 172 m (564 ft)
- Coordinates: 26°43′11″N 127°48′26″E

Naming
- Native name: 城山 (Japanese)

Geography
- Location within Japan
- Location: Ie, Okinawa Prefecture, Japan

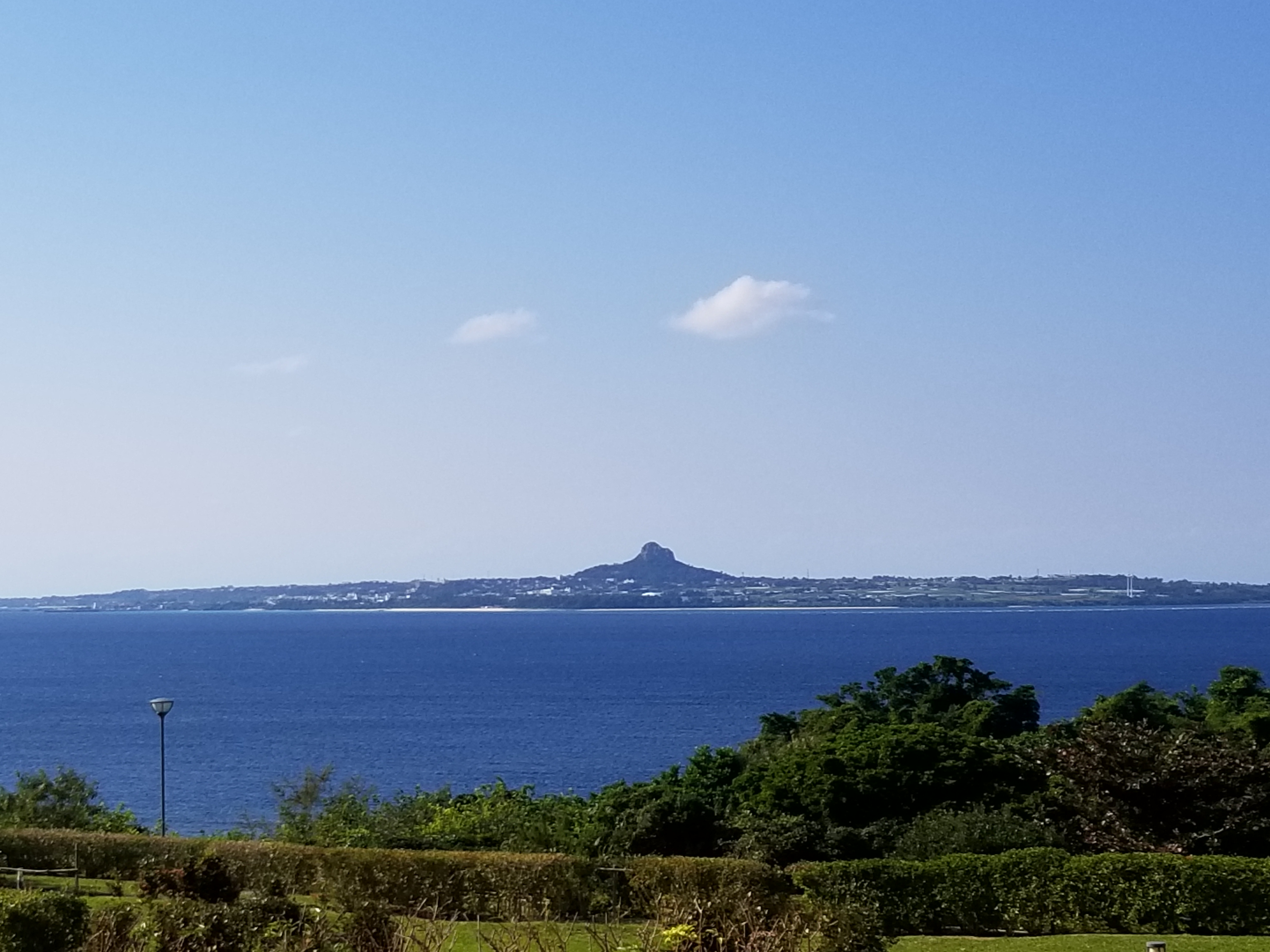
Mount Gusuku as seen from Ocean Expo Park in Motobu

Mount Gusuku (Japanese: 城山, Hepburn: Gusuku-yama; Kunigami: Tatchū-yama) is a mountain on the island of Iejima, northwest of Okinawa Island. At 172.2 m (565.0 ft) tall, it is the highest point on Iejima. Mount Gusuku is considered a symbol of Iejima due to its distinctive conical shape.

The mountain sits on the eastern side of the island and is clearly visible from the main island of Okinawa and the East China Sea. The outline of Mount Gusuku can be clearly seen from the Motobu Peninsula on Okinawa Island and Sesoko Island. The mountain has historically served as a nautical landmark and appears in nautical charts from the medieval period.

== Etymology ==
The Japanese reading for the mountain is "Shiro-yama;" however, in Okinawan, it is pronounced "Gusuku-yama." The meaning of 城 in both languages is "castle." In Kunigami, the mountain is referred to as Tatchū (タッチュー).

== Geology ==
Mount Gusuku is 70 million years older than the rest of Iejima. The mountain was formed by a unique offscrape phenomenon: an older level of bedrock was displaced by newer bedrock to form an admixture of the two.

== Utaki ==
Mount Gusuku is a site considered sacred in the Ryukyuan religion. An utaki, or shrine of the Ryukyuan religion, is located halfway to the summit of the mountain, and the path leading to the shrine is marked by torii gates. Historically the utaki at Mount Gusuku has been utilized for prayers for safe sea voyages and crops.
