= IEJ =

IEJ may refer to:

- the Iejima Airport
- the Israel Exploration Journal
- the Nazi "Institut zur Erforschung der Judenfrage" ("Institute for Study of the Jewish Question")
