= Minna Island =

Minna Island (Japanese: 水納島, Hepburn: Minnajima) is the name of two islands in Okinawa Prefecture, Japan:

- Minna Island, Motobu, Kunigami District, geographically part of the Okinawa Islands
- Minna Island, Tarama, Miyako District, geographically part of the Amami Islands
