= Kiyohide =

- Gender: Male

Origin
- Origin: Japanese
- Meaning: Different meanings depending on the kanji used

Kiyohide (written: 清秀, 清英 or 健秀) is a masculine Japanese given name. Notable people with the name include:

- Kiyohide Kuwata (桑田 健秀; born 1953), Japanese basketball player
- Nakagawa Kiyohide (中川 清秀; 1542–1583), Japanese daimyō
- Kiyohide Seki (関 清英; 1851–1927), Japanese politician
- Kiyohide Shima (志摩 清英; 1890–1973), Imperial Japanese Navy admiral
- Kiyohide Shinjo (新城 清秀; born 1951), Japanese karateka
