= Shinjō =

Shinjo may refer to:

- Shinjō, Yamagata, a city in Japan
- Shinjō, Okayama, a village in Japan
- Shinjō, Nara, a former town in Japan
- Shinjō (surname)
