= Shinjō (name) =

Shinjō, Shinjo or Shinjou (written: 新條, 新城, 新庄) is a Japanese surname. Notable people with the surname include:

- Shinjo Hiroki (新條 宏喜) (born 1973), Japanese footballer
- Shinjō Kazuma (born 1951), Japanese science fiction writer
- Shinjō Kiyohide (新城 清秀) (born 1951), 9th Dan Okinawan Uechi-Ryū Master, nine-time all-Okinawa Kata and Kumite Champion
- Shinjo Mayu (新條 まゆ) (born 1973), Japanese manga artist
- Shinjo Naoyori (新庄 直頼) (1538–1613), Japanese samurai
- Shinjo Shinzo (新城 新蔵) (1873–1938), Japanese academic, physicist and astronomer
- Shinjo Tsuyoshi (新庄 剛志) (born 1972), Japanese baseball player

Fictional characters

- Shinjō Akane (新条 アカネ), a character in the anime series SSSS.Gridman

Shinjō (written: 真乗) is also a masculine Japanese given name. Notable people with the name include:

- Shinjō Itō (伊藤 真乗), (1906–1989), Japanese Buddhist
