= Sesoko Island =

Island in Okinawa, Japan

Native name: 瀬底島(Kunigami:Siiku, Okinawan:Sisuku jima)
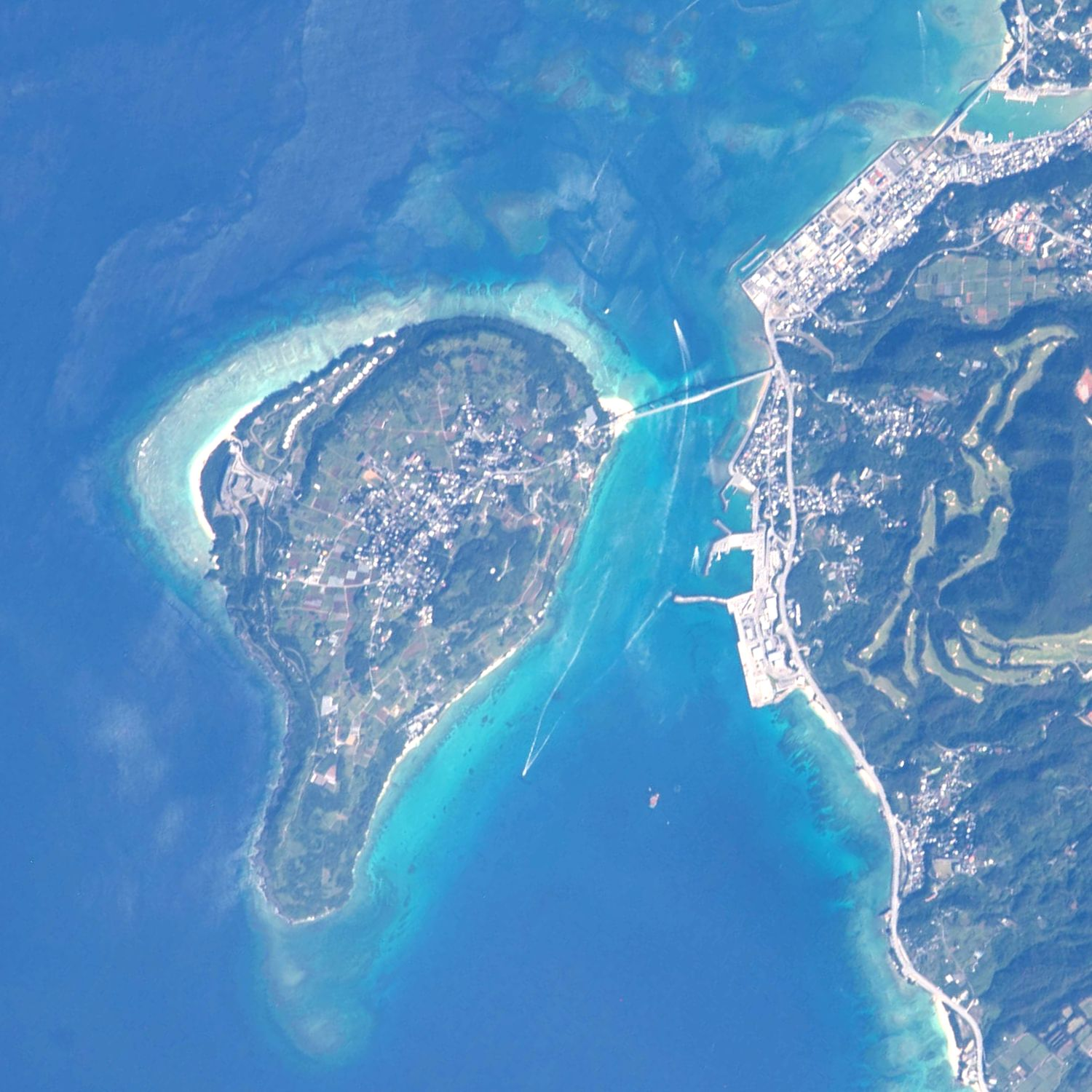
- Aerial view of Sesoko Island and Sesoko Bridge, Japan
- Interactive map of Sesoko Island

Geography
- Location: Okinawa Prefecture, Japan
- Coordinates: 26°38′42″N 127°51′52″E
- Archipelago: Ryukyu Islands
- Area: 2.99 km^{2} (1.15 sq mi)

Demographics
- Ethnic groups: Ryukyuan, Japanese

Sesoko Island (瀬底島, Okinawan: Sisuku-jima, Kunigami:Siiku) is a small island in Okinawa Prefecture, Japan. Politically, the place is administered by the town of Motobu, which is a part of the Kunigami District in the northern Okinawa Islands.

It is a popular tourist destination due to its beaches. The island is accessible by car using the 762 meters long Sesoko Bridge. Both Iejima and Minnajima can be seen from Sesoko, and coral reefs are located 500 meters offshore the coastline.

== History ==
By the 15th century, Sesoko was a part of the Ryukyu Kingdom, a former country that controlled much of the Ryukyu Islands. After Japan's annexation of the kingdom in 1879, control of the island was transferred over to the modern prefecture of Okinawa. In 1950, it was put under the United States Civil Administration of the Ryukyu Islands as a result of the Second World War. Sesoko, along with the rest of Okinawa, were returned to Japan in 1972.
