= Ōike =

Karst pond in Minamidaito, Okinawa, Japan

- 大池 (Japanese)
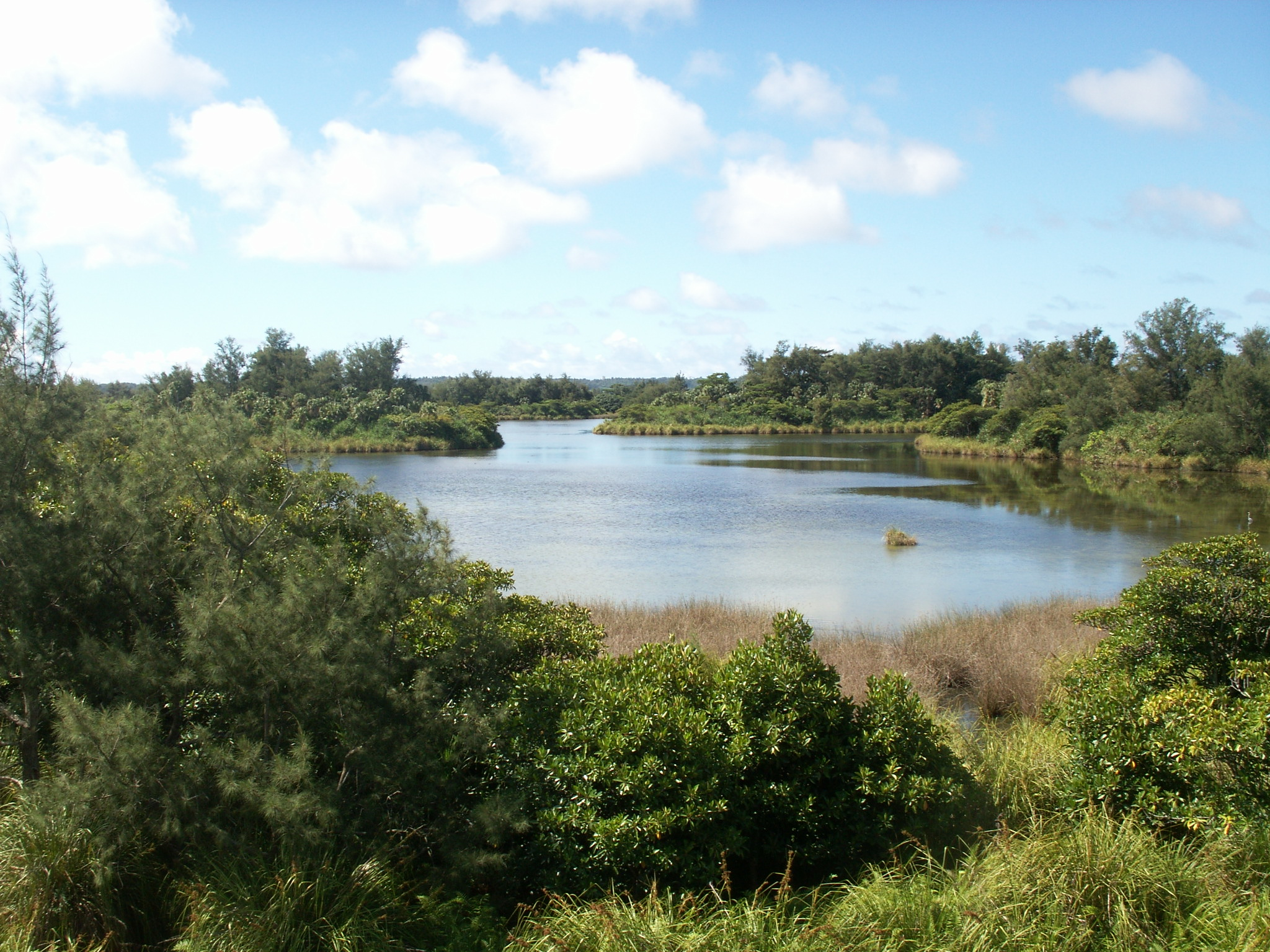

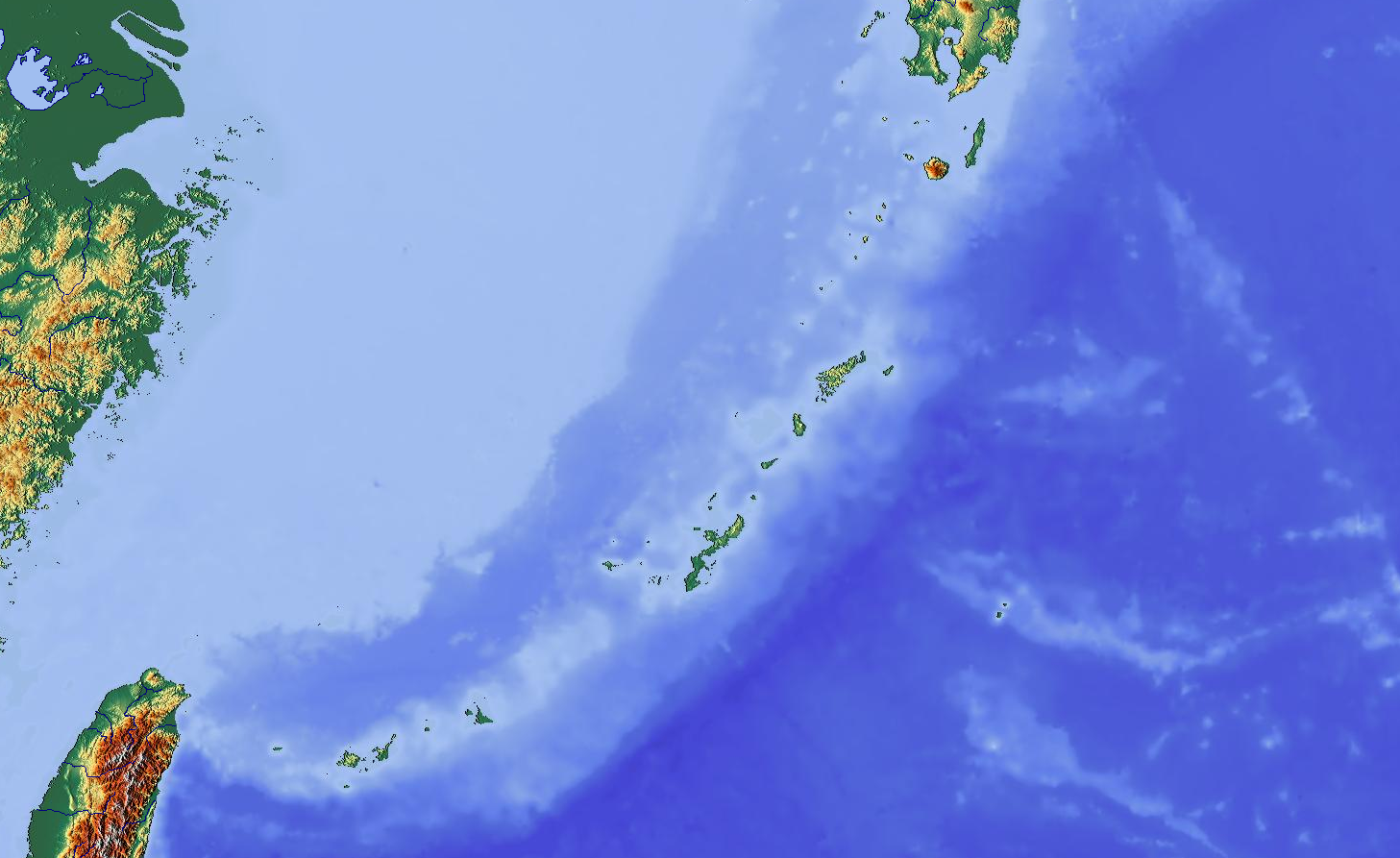
- Location within Ryukyu Islands
- Location: Minamidaitōjima, Okinawa Prefecture, Japan
- Coordinates: 25°51′18″N 131°14′19″E
- Surface area: 0.31 km^{2} (0.12 sq mi)
- Max. depth: 1.3 m (4 ft 3 in)
- Shore length^{1}: 5.50 km (3.42 mi)
- ^{1} Shore length is not a well-defined measure.

Ōike (大池) is a karst pond on Minamidaitōjima, Okinawa Prefecture, Japan. Ōike is the largest pond containing both freshwater and seawater. It covers 0.31 square kilometres (0.12 sq mi), the circumference is 5.50 kilometres (3.42 mi), and it is 1.3 metres (4 ft 3 in) at its deepest point. Fresh water is mixed with seawater beneath.

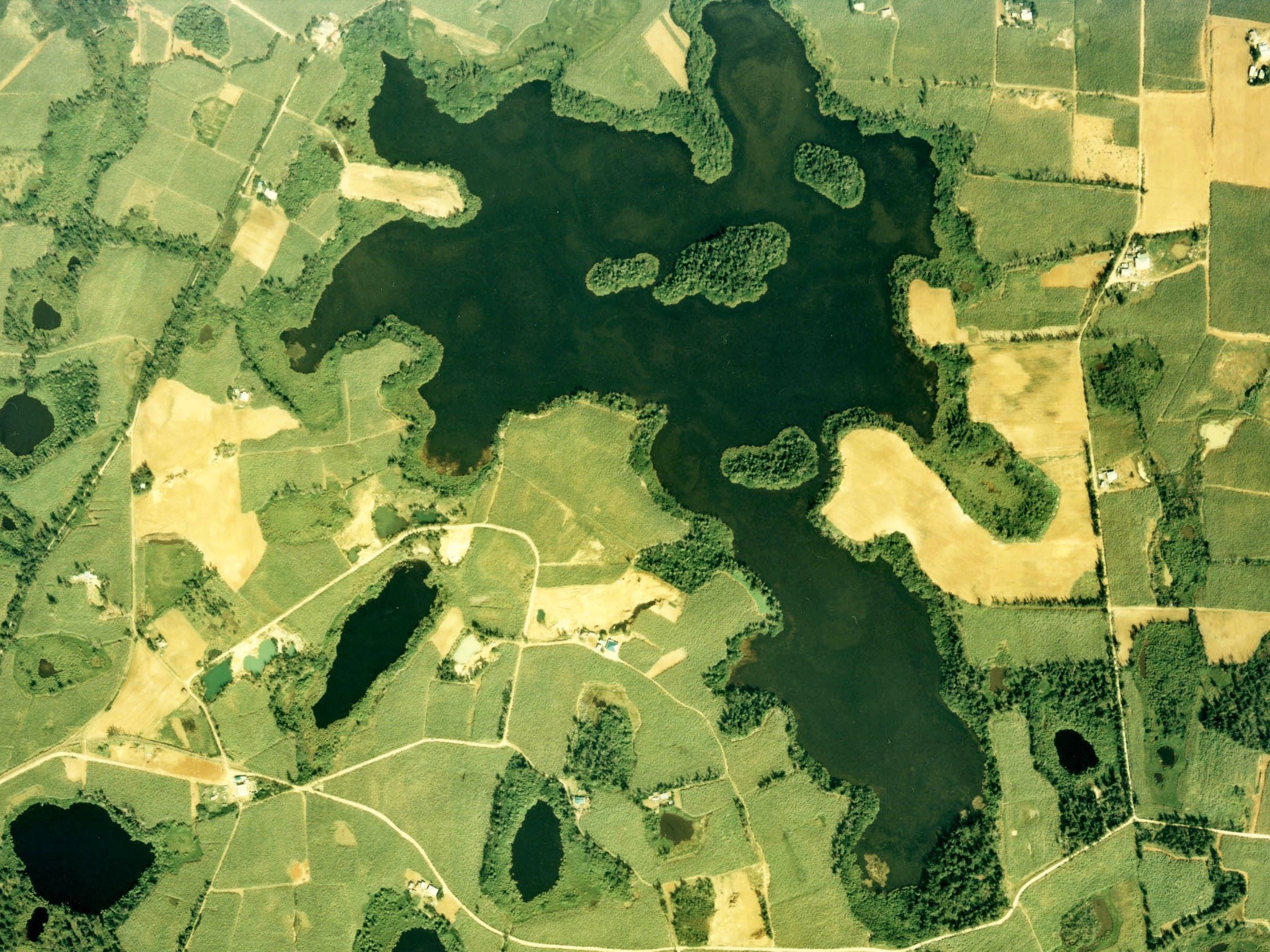
Aerial photograph of Ōike taken in 1978, smaller ponds are visible around the Ōike Pond

== Geology ==
The island is composed of elevated limestone from its atoll. Rainwater has dissolved the limestone leading to a depression in the ground (sinkhole). This has filled with water to become a pond.

== Natural history ==
On the north of the pond extends an area of wetland with large communities of Bruguera gymnorrhiza, a mangrove plant, which was designated as a Natural monument since it is unique in freshwater on March 18, 1975. Other plants include Scirpus tabemaemontani C. C. Gemlin, Panicum repens L. Najas marina and Vallisneria natans.

Common carp and Carassius auratus langsdorfii were introduced in 1910 and tilapia in 1955. Birds include mallard, Pacific reef heron, common moorhen and cattle egret.
