= Ie, Okinawa =

Ie 伊江村 Ii
- Village
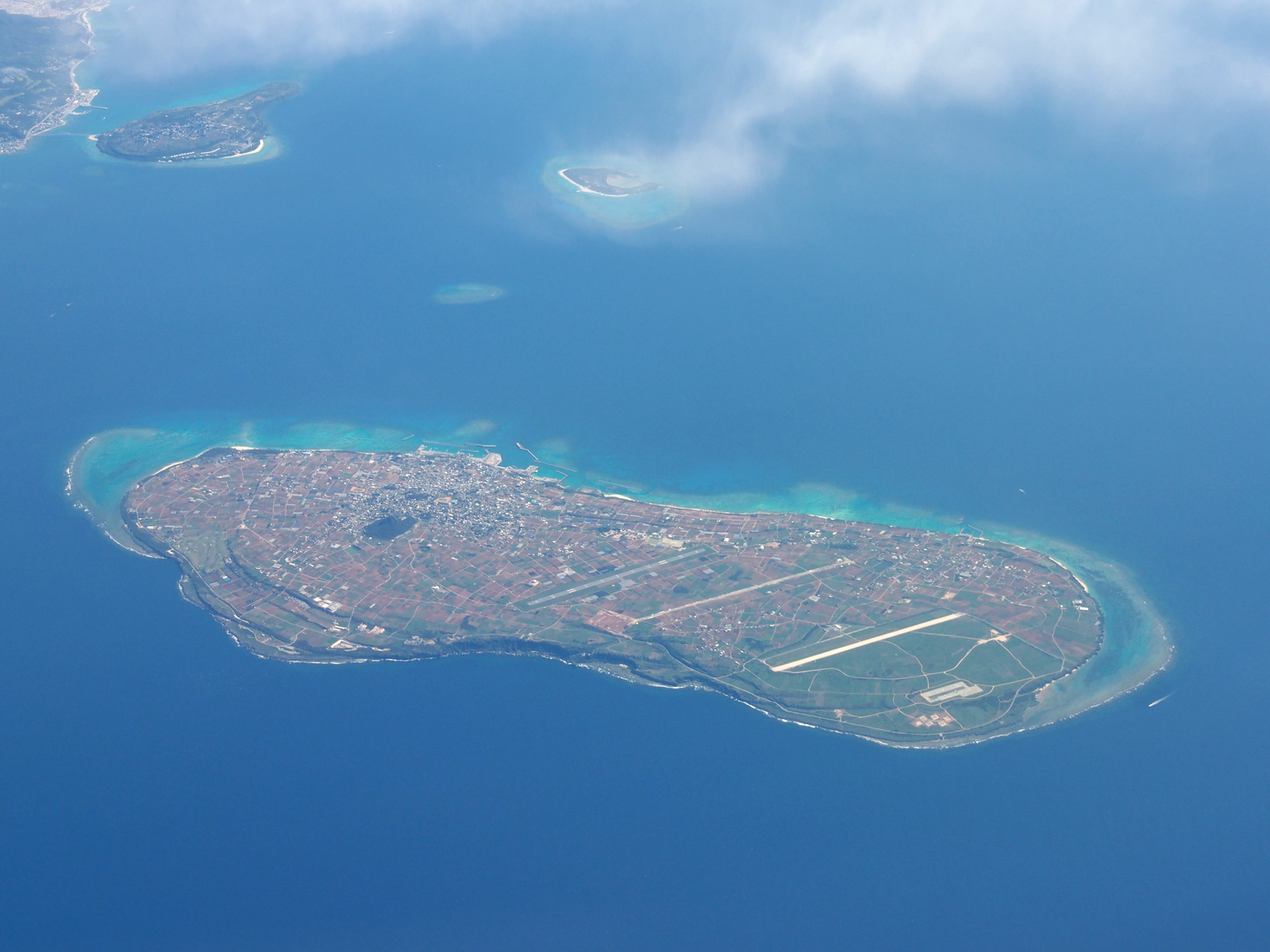
- View of Ie

- Flag Emblem

- Location of Ie in Okinawa Prefecture

- Location in Japan
- Coordinates: 26°42′48″N 127°48′26″E
- Country: Japan
- Region: Kyushu
- Prefecture: Okinawa Prefecture
- District: Kunigami

Area
  - Total: 22.75 km^{2} (8.78 sq mi)

Population (October 1, 2020)
  - Total: 4,118
  - Density: 181.0/km^{2} (468.8/sq mi)
- Time zone: UTC+09:00 (JST)
- Website: www.iejima.org

Ie (Japanese: 伊江村, Hepburn: Ie-son; Kunigami and Okinawan: Ii) is a village located in Kunigami District, Okinawa Prefecture, Japan. The village lies on the island of Iejima.

As of 1 October 2020, the village has an estimated population of 4,118 and the density of 180 persons per km^{2}. Ie is in a period of sustained population loss, and has the highest rate of population loss in Okinawa Prefecture. The total area of the village is 22.75 square kilometres (8.78 mi^{2}). Iejima Airport serves the village. Out of 22.78 km^{2} land of Ie, approximately a third, or 8.02 km^{2} is occupied by Ie Shima Airfield, a training facility, managed by the United States Marine Corps.

== Geography ==
The Village of Ie covers the entirety of Ie Island, and is located to the northwest of Okinawa Island off the Motobu Peninsula. The village is connected to Okinawa via ferry service.

=== Administrative divisions ===
The village is divided into five wards.

- Kawahira (川平)
- Higashiemae (東江前)
- Higashieue (東江上)
- Nishiemae (西江前)
- Nishieue (西江上)

== History ==
The Village of Ie was the site of intense fighting during World War II in the Battle of Okinawa. Ernie Pyle (1900 – 1945), a popular World War II-era American journalist and winner of the 1944 Pulitzer Prize was killed in Ie on April 18, 1945. Pyle was initially buried on the island, but is now interred at the National Memorial Cemetery of the Pacific in Honolulu.

Approximately a half of residents lost their lives during the battle of Ie, and 1,500 villagers who survived the battle were removed to the internment camps in Kerama Islands or an arid strip of Henoko Bay, the northeast area of Okinawa island. Residents of Ie were allowed to return to the island during a two-year period starting in May 1946. Life in the village was hard after World War II; little housing remained on the island, and prewar property boundaries were difficult or impossible to determine. Residents in the immediate post-war period lived in homes made of scavenged materials and relied on American rations for food.

An elementary school was built immediately after the war, and the first village hall was constructed in front of Udunyama. One third of the village remains under U.S. military control.

== Cultural Properties ==
- Name (Japanese) (Type of registration)

=== Folk Cultural Properties ===
- Amibōja (アミボージャ) (Municipal)
- Ara Utaki sacred site (阿良御嶽) (Municipal)
- Māga spring (マーガ) (Municipal)
- Minkazantu water tank (ミンカザント ゥ) (Municipal)

=== Historic Sites ===
- Birthplace of Uechi Tarō, author of the Kumiodori play "Chūshingura" (組踊「忠臣蔵」作者上地太郎生誕の地) (Municipal)
- Deer fossils of Ie Island (伊江島鹿の化石) (Prefectural)
- Gohezu Cave Site of Ie Island (伊江島のゴヘズ洞穴遺跡) (Prefectural)
- Gongendō shrine site (権現堂跡) (Municipal)
- Hamasaki Shell Mound (浜崎貝塚) (Prefectural)
- Kushibaru Shell Mound (具志原貝塚) (National)
- Kwēju School site (会所跡) (Municipal)
- Public pawn shop site (公益質屋跡) (Municipal)

=== Places of scenic beauty ===
- Mount Gusuku in Ie Village (伊江村の城山) (Prefectural)
- Wajii spring (湧出 or わじぃー) (Municipal)

=== Natural Monuments ===
- Hada plant community (ハダ植物群落) (Municipal)

== Transportation ==
=== Air ===
The Village of Ie has a single airport, Iejima Airport, but regular flights to Naha ended in 1977. The runway of the airport were part of the Ie Shima Airfield complex built during World War II. Iejima Airport is primarily used in training exercises by the United States military.

=== Ferry ===
The Village of Ie is connected to Okinawa Island via ferry service. A passenger and car ferry from Port Toguchi in the town of Motobu takes approximately 30 minutes, with regular service consisting of 4 daily departures from Motobu between 9am and 5pm. The village is also connected to the prefectural capital of Naha via a one-hour high-speed ferry from the Port of Tomari.

== Education ==
The municipality has three schools:

- Ie Junior High School (伊江中学校)
- Ie Elementary School (伊江小学校)
- Nishi (West) Elementary School (西小学校)

== Notable people ==
- Uechi Kanbun, Founder of Uechi-Ryū.
- Shinjō Kiyohide, 9th Dan Okinawan Uechi-Ryū Master, nine-time all-Okinawa Kata and Kumite Champion.
- Anly, a Japanese pop musician, was born and raised on the island. She also serves as the tourism ambassador for Ie.
- Ernie Pyle, famed war correspondent and journalist, was killed in Ie Shima (now Ieshima) during the final months of WWII.
