= Fumiko Nakamura =

Japanese peace activist

- 中村文子
- Born: July 1913; Motobu, Okinawa Prefecture, Japan
- Died: 27 June 2013 (aged 99); Yaese, Okinawa, Japan
- Occupation(s): Teacher, peace activist
- Years active: 1933–2013
- Children: 3

Fumiko Nakamura (Japanese: 中村文子, July 1913 – 27 June 2013) was a Japanese teacher and peace activist. Born and raised on Okinawa, she attended normal school and became a teacher in 1933. Before World War II, she taught students and led the Girls' Youth Organization that it was honorable to die for their country. After her marriage, she relocated in 1941 to Kawasaki, Kanagawa, where she continued to teach until the effects of the war made working impossible. After experiencing the horrors of war, she regretted her participation in indoctrinating young people to favor war. In 1946, her family returned to Okinawa and she resumed teaching elementary school until 1974.

Upon her return to Okinawa, Nakamura began protesting the continued military presence and United States Civil Administration of the Ryukyu Islands. Even after 1972, when sovereignty of the island was returned to Japan, she continued anti-war and anti-military demonstrations. For a decade after her retirement, she served as the vice president of the Okinawa Women's Association. In 1983 at a women's conference, she learned of the Okinawan Historical Film Society's efforts to break the silence about talking about the bombing of Okinawa. She became director of the society in 1986 and the secretary general of the Ichi Feeto Undō no Kai (One-Foot Movement Association), an organization aimed at buying US film footage taken during the war. The One-Foot Movement made two films about the Okinawa bombing and Nakamura toured world-wide presenting the film and advocating for peace. She remained active as a pacifist until her death in 2013.

== Early life and education ==
Funiko Nakamura was born in July 1913, in Motobu, Okinawa Prefecture, Japan. Nakamura entered school in 1920, attending the first two grades at the local village school, before transferring to the main school for the Kunigami District. Besides Japanese, geography, history, math and science, she also studied English. Another part of her training included civics courses aimed at teaching students how to be good citizens and respect authorities. At fourteen, she followed her childhood dream to become a teacher, and began studying at the normal school. She graduated in 1933.

== Career ==
At the age of nineteen, Nakamura became a teacher at the elementary school she had attended in Motobu. From her school days, Japan had been involved in escalating conflict in China. When she became a teacher, Nakamura participated in ceremonies glorifying men who were called to fight and organizing students to assist the families of soldiers who were away. Patriotic campaigns prompted women to involve themselves in activities to support the war. Young Japanese students had been trained to honorably die for their emperor and view death in battle as a virtue. Nakamura became a leader in the Girls' Youth Organization, which organized unmarried women and girls to cheer for departing soldiers, attend funeral services for fallen veterans, and make care packages and senninbari (good luck belts) for men at the front.

Nakamura married a local man in 1940 at her parents' home. He had studied to be a teacher, but finding no employment and being rejected for military service because of poor health, her husband took a post to work at Fuji Electric in Yokohama. In 1941, she was transferred to teach at a secondary school in Kawasaki, in the Kanagawa Prefecture. Soon after arriving in Kawasaki, a factory near her school was bombed by American airmen. Nakamura, pregnant at the time, began to experience the impact of war firsthand. In her role of teacher, she was responsible for teaching children to honor and respect the country and the Emperor, as well as despise enemies of them, which she later regretted. She was able to continue teaching after the birth of her first son because her mother-in-law was able to come and live with them.

When her second child was born in 1944, Nakamura had to quit working because the shortages of milk meant nursing was the only way to feed the baby. During this time, there were almost nightly sirens and a scramble to secure herself and the children in a small bomb shelter. The following year a bomb hit the next-door-neighbor's home and the resulting fire soon engulfed Nakamura's home. She and her husband ran with her mother-in-law and the children to the center of town, but realizing that they had nowhere to go and no belongings, they boarded a train and traveled to Fujisawa, where other family members lived. They lived in the countryside from April to November 1945, when they were able to return to Yokohama and find lodging in a former military barracks. Nakamura's husband worked assisting Okinawans to return to the island and she cared for the children and scavenged supplies she could be found on the beaches and US military waste pile. During this time the couple had their third child in March 1946.

When the war ended, Nakamura and her family returned to Okinawa Island. They traveled by boat in July 1946 and first were housed in a factory for a week, in Nagoya to await a second boat which would take them to the relocation camp in Kitanakagusuku for another week. When they reached Motobu, Nakamura learned that her mother had died the previous year. After nursing her husband, oldest son, and mother-in-law, who had contracted malaria, for several months, Nakamura returned to teaching in November. The first school she taught in had thatch for the walls and roof, and a dirt floor. In inclement weather the roof leaked and the floor turned to mud. Although she and others appealed to the American and mainland governments, initial funds were only given for school supplies and not building improvements. Eventually new concrete schools were built. Nakamura retired from teaching in 1974, after four decades of work.

== Activism ==
Nakamura participated in sit-ins at the Kadena Air Base in opposition to the continued military presence in Okinawa. Although the island was jointly governed by the local Ryukyuan Government and the US Civil Administration, the Americans had final authority, which the native population found unacceptable. Nakamura believed, according to scholar Miyume Tanji, that school teachers were prominent leaders in the anti-war and anti-military-base movements, because they regretted having encouraged and promoted students to die for the country. The US Civil Administration finally reverted to Japanese sovereignty in 1972. Conditions on the island did not improve, and Okinawans found themselves at odds with investors and administrators from the mainland, who had different visions for development than the local population. Even after the island was returned to Japanese rule, American military bases remained. Nakamura continued to protest their presence as an anti-war and anti-militarization activist.

After her retirement, Nakamura became the vice president of the Okinawa Women's Association, an affiliate of the Japanese Women's Association. She participated in a 1983 conference for the parent organization in which official support was given to the Okinawan Historical Film Society for a campaign to have survivors of the war speak of their experiences. Because most people were only knowledgeable about what happened in Hiroshima and Nagasaki, Nakamura thought that it was important to bring global awareness to "what happened here" on Okinawa. Exchange students who had studied in the US, and members of the Naha City Workers' Union and Okinawa Teachers Union initially founded the Historical Film Society, with the hope of using archival film footage for educational purposes.

In 1986, Nakamura became the director of the Okinawan Historical Film Society, and the secretary general of the Ichi Feeto Undō no Kai (One-Foot Movement Association). The One-Foot Association was formed on 8 December 1983, to commemorate the day that the United States declared war on Japan. The name of the organization was a reference to their goal to have Okinawans purchase one foot of film, from the National Archives and Records Administration of the United States to educate people about the Battle of Okinawa. It was inspired by the Jū Feeto Undō no Kai (Ten-Feet Movement Association) in Hiroshima, which also bought US film footage. The association bought its first unedited film without sound in 1984. They showed it to an audience at the Naha Citizens' Hall to a packed house. The first edited version Okinawa sen: Mirai e no Shōgen (The Battle of Okinawa: Testimony for the Future) was completed and began touring the country in 1986. Reviews were positive and purchases of the film exceeded all expectations. In 1988, an English-language version was produced and began distribution as far away as North and South America. In 1995 the association released a second film to mark the 50th anniversary of the end of World War II. Document Okinawa Sen (Document: The Battle of Okinawa) also received good reviews. Nakamura toured with the film internationally advocating for peace.

When the war on terror was initiated in the twenty-first century and Japan began to expand its role militarily, contemplating turning the Japan Self-Defense Forces into a "full-fledged military", Nakamura protested the idea. She remained active in the peace movement well into her 90s. She also supported the revival of Okinawan culture which began to occur after the war. The mainland policy of assimilation, which had been in place since the Meiji era, was dropped and art, music, and the local Okinawan dialect began to be revived. Nakamura said that young Okinawans had developed pride in their heritage and a confidence to express themselves. She valued their ability to express themselves freely, because she had lived in a time where freedom of speech did not exist.

== Death and legacy ==
Nakamura died on 27 June 2013, at her home in Yaese, Okinawa. She is often referred to by media as the mother of Okinawa's peace movement and is remembered for her years of service dedicated to pacifism.
