= Minamidaitōjima =

Island within Ryukyu Islands

Native name: 南大東島 Minamidaitō-jima
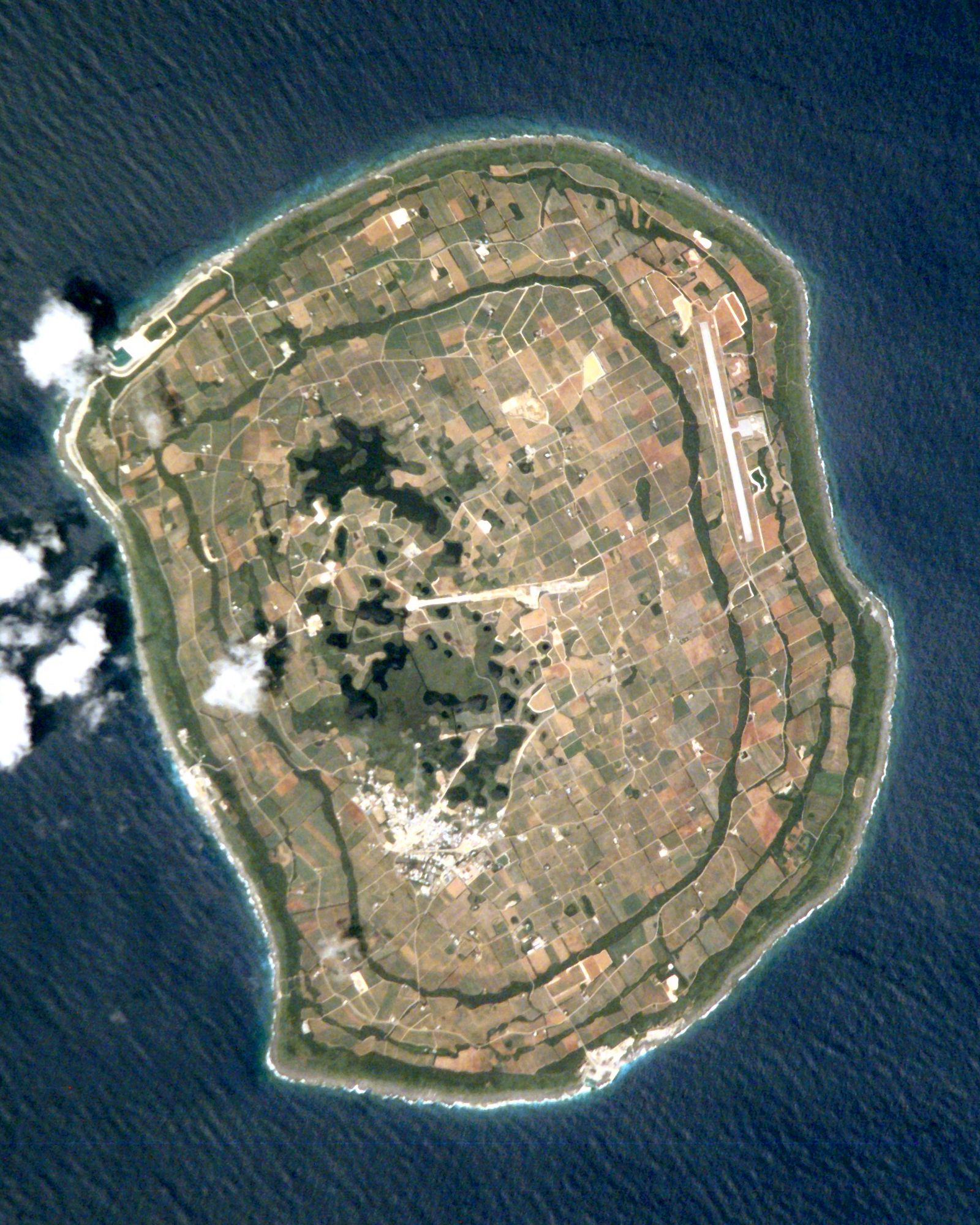
- Aerial Photograph of Minamidaitōjima

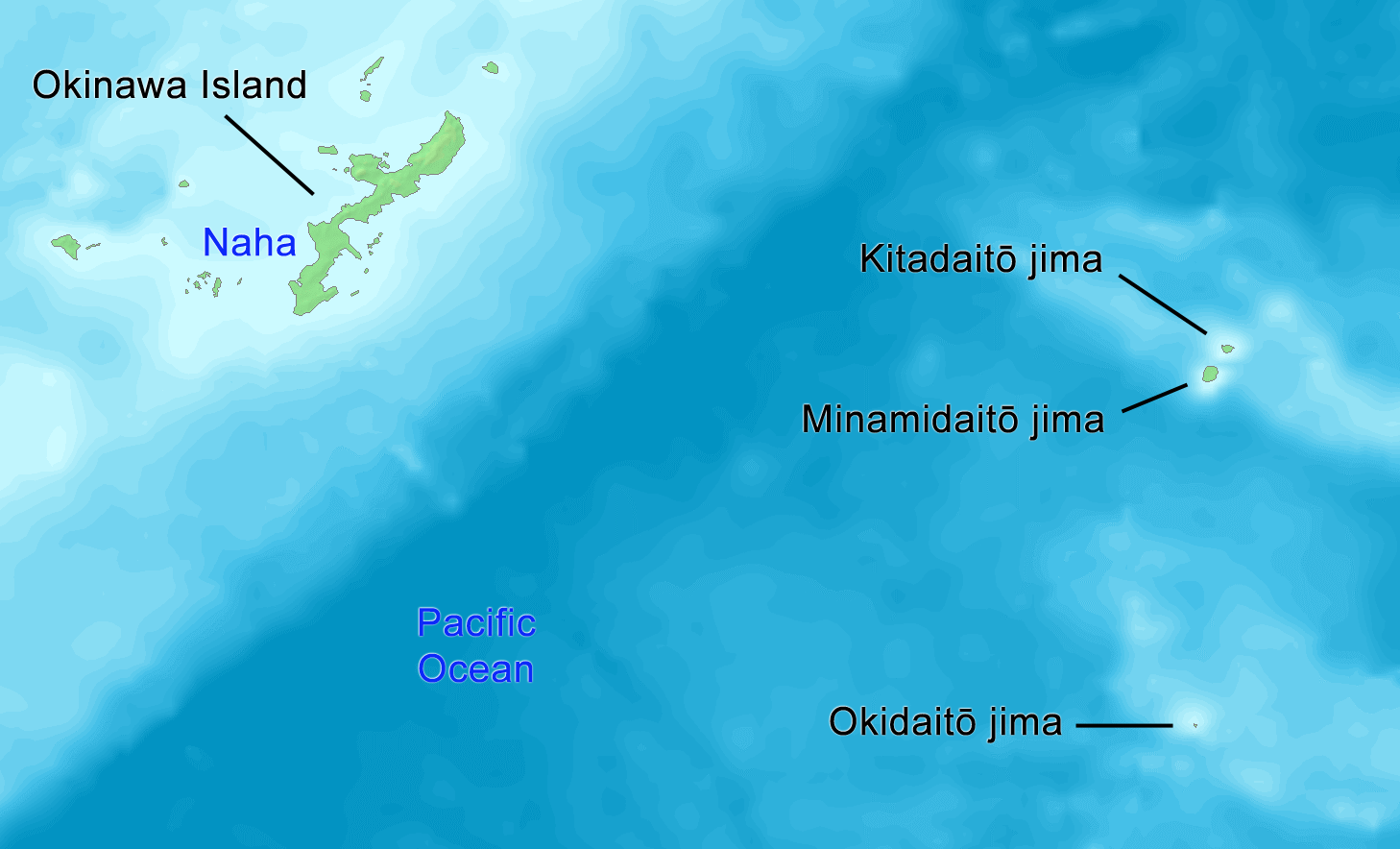

Geography
- Location: Philippine Sea
- Coordinates: 25°50′N 131°14′E
- Archipelago: Daitō Islands
- Area: 30.57 km^{2} (11.80 sq mi)
- Length: 4.85 km (3.014 mi)
- Coastline: 18.3 km (11.37 mi)
- Highest elevation: 75 m (246 ft)

Administration
- Japan
- Prefectures: Okinawa Prefecture
- District: Shimajiri District
- Village: Minamidaitō

Demographics
- Population: 2,107 (2010)
- Ethnic groups: Ryukyuan, Japanese

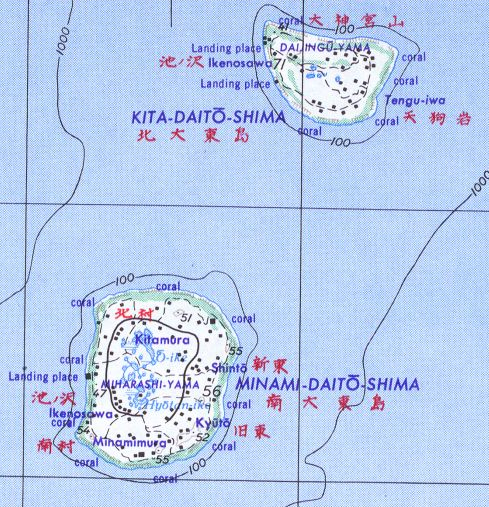
Map of Minamidaitō

Minamidaitōjima (Japanese: 南大東島), also spelled Minami Daitō or Minami-Daitō, is the largest island in the Daitō Islands group southeast of Okinawa, Japan. It is administered as part of the village of Minamidaitō, Okinawa. Shimajiri District, Okinawa and has a population of 2,107. The island is principally cultivated for agriculture. The island has no beaches but has a fishing boat harbor and three cargo and ferry ports; as well as an airport Minami Daito Airport (airport code "MMD").

== Geography ==
Minamidaitōjima is a relatively isolated coralline island, located approximately 9 kilometres (4.9 nmi) south of Kitadaitōjima, the second largest island of the archipelago, and 360 kilometres (190 nmi) from Naha, Okinawa. As with the other islands in the archipelago, Minamidaitōjima is an uplifted coral atoll with a steep coastal cliff of limestone (the former fringing coral reef of the island), and a depressed center (the former lagoon of the island). The island is roughly oval in shape, with a circumference of about 13.52 kilometres (8.40 mi), length of 4.85 kilometres (3.01 mi) and an area of 11.94 square kilometres (4.61 sq mi). The highest point is 74 metres (243 ft) above sea level. The island contains several ponds in the interior, such as the Ōike-pond.

Gallery

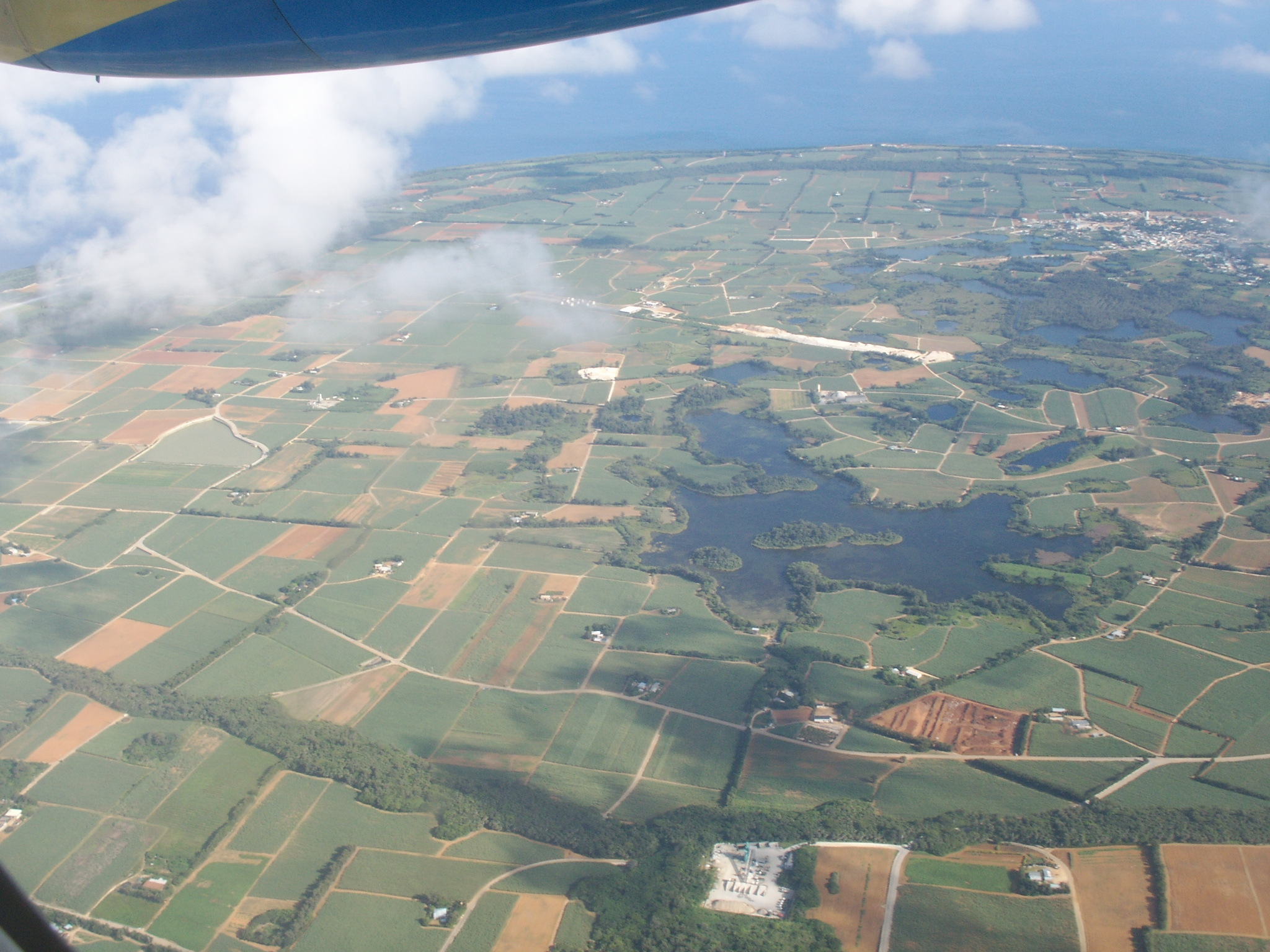
Minamidaitōjima

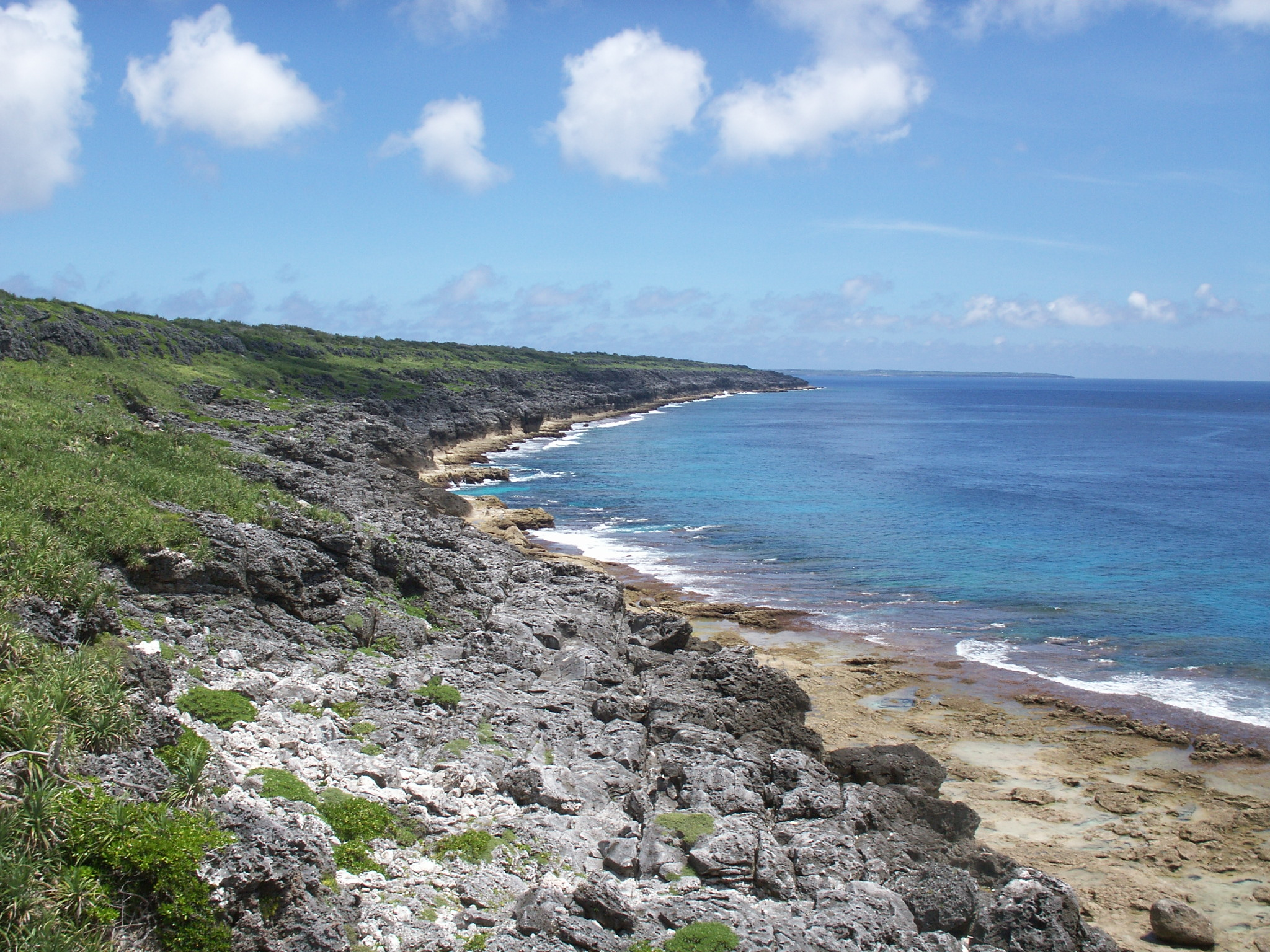
Minamidaitojima coast surrounded by cliffs

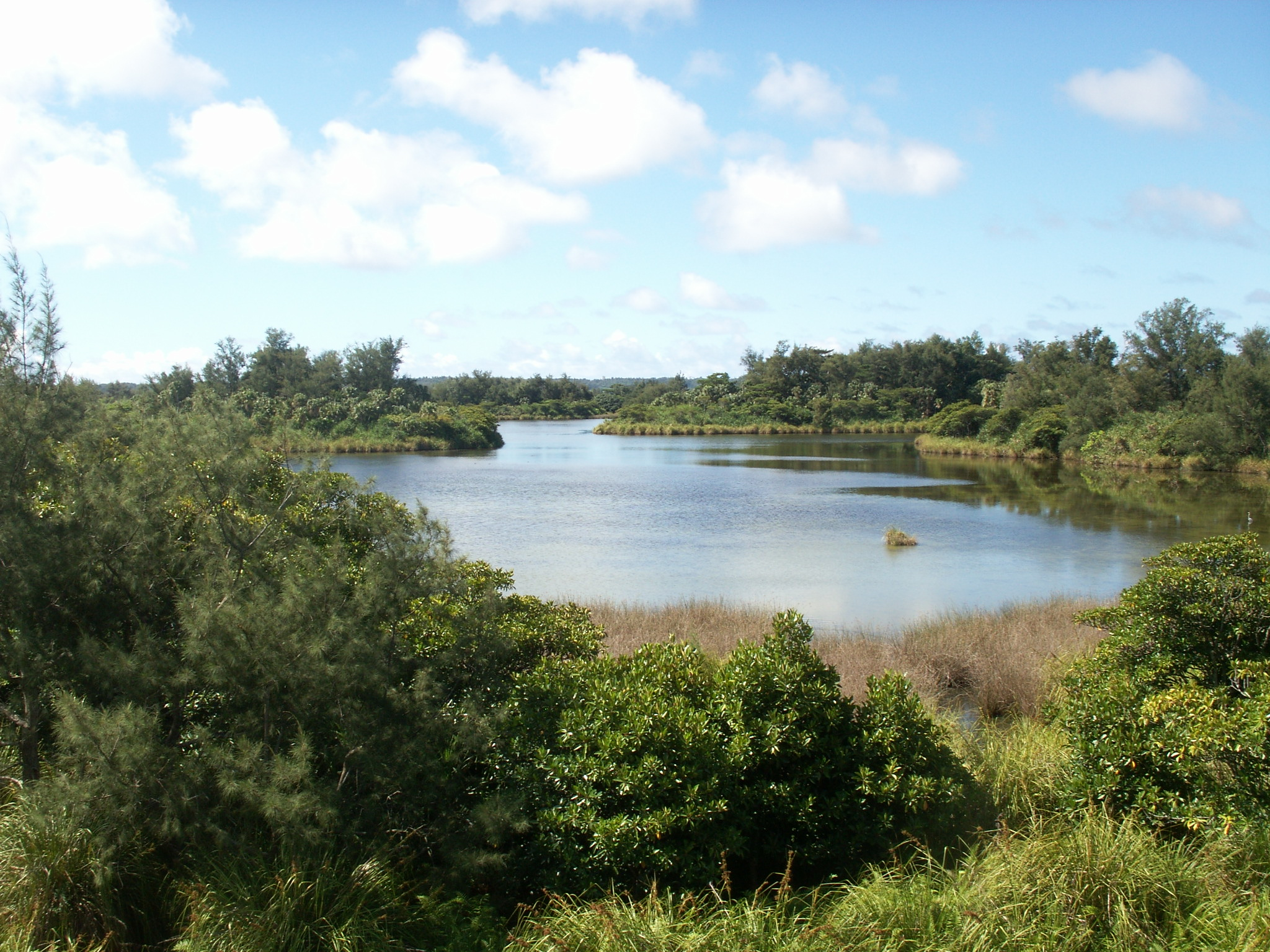
A lake on the island

== Climate ==
Minamidaitōjima has a tropical rainforest climate (Köppen climate classification Af) with hot summers and warm winters. Precipitation is significant throughout the year; the wettest month is June and the driest month is February. The island is subject to frequent typhoons.

Climate data for Minamidaitō (1991−2020 normals, extremes 1942−present)
Month	Jan	Feb	Mar	Apr	May	Jun	Jul	Aug	Sep	Oct	Nov	Dec	Year
Record high °C (°F)	26.8 (80.2)	27.6 (81.7)	28.1 (82.6)	30.2 (86.4)	31.9 (89.4)	34.1 (93.4)	35.3 (95.5)	34.6 (94.3)	34.0 (93.2)	33.1 (91.6)	30.8 (87.4)	28.3 (82.9)	35.3 (95.5)
Mean maximum °C (°F)	25.0 (77.0)	25.1 (77.2)	26.1 (79.0)	28.0 (82.4)	29.9 (85.8)	32.0 (89.6)	33.2 (91.8)	33.0 (91.4)	32.6 (90.7)	31.1 (88.0)	28.9 (84.0)	26.2 (79.2)	33.4 (92.1)
Mean daily maximum °C (°F)	21.1 (70.0)	21.2 (70.2)	22.6 (72.7)	24.6 (76.3)	26.9 (80.4)	29.6 (85.3)	31.7 (89.1)	31.6 (88.9)	31.0 (87.8)	28.8 (83.8)	25.8 (78.4)	22.6 (72.7)	26.5 (79.6)
Daily mean °C (°F)	18.0 (64.4)	18.1 (64.6)	19.5 (67.1)	21.6 (70.9)	24.1 (75.4)	26.9 (80.4)	28.7 (83.7)	28.6 (83.5)	27.9 (82.2)	25.9 (78.6)	23.1 (73.6)	19.7 (67.5)	23.5 (74.3)
Mean daily minimum °C (°F)	14.6 (58.3)	14.8 (58.6)	16.4 (61.5)	18.8 (65.8)	21.5 (70.7)	24.8 (76.6)	25.9 (78.6)	25.9 (78.6)	25.0 (77.0)	23.0 (73.4)	20.4 (68.7)	16.6 (61.9)	20.6 (69.1)
Mean minimum °C (°F)	8.3 (46.9)	8.2 (46.8)	9.9 (49.8)	12.4 (54.3)	16.0 (60.8)	20.7 (69.3)	23.3 (73.9)	23.2 (73.8)	21.4 (70.5)	17.7 (63.9)	14.8 (58.6)	10.3 (50.5)	7.0 (44.6)
Record low °C (°F)	3.5 (38.3)	4.3 (39.7)	5.3 (41.5)	4.7 (40.5)	10.6 (51.1)	14.6 (58.3)	19.4 (66.9)	19.7 (67.5)	16.1 (61.0)	12.9 (55.2)	9.8 (49.6)	6.4 (43.5)	3.5 (38.3)
Average precipitation mm (inches)	77.0 (3.03)	79.9 (3.15)	84.2 (3.31)	113.6 (4.47)	222.0 (8.74)	199.6 (7.86)	118.0 (4.65)	151.1 (5.95)	167.9 (6.61)	180.5 (7.11)	120.9 (4.76)	124.7 (4.91)	1,639.3 (64.54)
Average precipitation days (≥ 1.0 mm)	8.4	7.8	7.3	8.0	10.6	9.4	8.1	10.5	10.7	10.4	8.6	8.7	108.5
Average relative humidity (%)	69	71	74	78	84	87	81	81	80	77	74	70	77
Mean monthly sunshine hours	121.3	120.3	154.0	152.8	171.0	219.3	277.8	249.3	220.4	178.4	136.4	120.8	2,121.7
Source: Japan Meteorological Agency

== History ==
It is uncertain when Minamidaitōjima was discovered. It is the most likely that their first sighting was by the Spanish navigator Bernardo de la Torre in 1543, in between 25 September and 2 October, during his abortive attempt to reach New Spain from the Philippines with the San Juan de Letrán. It was then charted, together with Kitadaitōjima, as "The Two Sisters" (Las Dos Hermanas). Minamidaitōjima and Kitadaitōjima were possibly again sighted by the Spanish on 28 July 1587, by Pedro de Unamuno who named them the "Useless Islands" (Islas sin Provecho). In 1788 the British captain John Meares named an island in the vicinity “Grampus Island”, but the recorded coordinates are not correct and it is not certain which of the Daitō island he sighted. The French also reported sighting an island in 1807. However, on 2 July 1820 the Russian vessel Borodino surveyed the two Daitō islands, and named the south as "South Borodino Island".

The island remained uninhabited until claimed by the Empire of Japan in 1885. In 1900, a team of pioneers from Hachijōjima, one of the Izu Islands located 287 kilometres (178 mi) south of Tokyo led by Tamaoki Han'emon (1838 – 1910), became the first human inhabitants of the island, and started the cultivation of sugar cane. The population reached 4000 in 1919. During this period until World War II, Minamidaitōjima was owned in its entirety by Dai Nippon Sugar (now Dai Nippon Meiji Sugar), which provided community services and subsidized pricing for its employees, and of whom were seasonal workers from Okinawa and Taiwan.

The island was garrisoned by the Japanese military in 1942. As the war situation worsened for Japan, many of the civilian inhabitants were evacuated to Okinawa, Kyushu or Hachijojima in 1944. The island was repeatedly bombed and shelled by the United States Navy from February to June 1945.

After World War II, the island was occupied by the United States, at which time its civilian population was 1426. The island was returned to Japan in 1972.

== In popular culture ==
The island is the main setting of the film Leaving on the 15th Spring, released in 2013 and starring Ayaka Miyoshi and Kaoru Kobayashi.
