= Shinjo Naoyori =

Japanese samurai

Shinjō Naoyori (新庄 直頼; 1538 – February 8, 1613) was a Japanese samurai of the mid-Sengoku period through early Edo period. The son of Shinjō Naomasa (lord of Asazuma Castle), he served as a retainer of the Azai clan of Ōmi Province. Starting his career as an officer of the Azai clan, he later defected to the Oda clan shortly before the fall of Odani Castle. Naoyori then became a cavalry officer (馬廻り umamawari) under Toyotomi Hideyoshi. He fought under Hideyoshi at the Battle of Yamazaki, and was granted a 12,000 koku fief centered on Takatsuki, in Settsu Province (with holdings in Yamato and Settsu Provinces). Later, in 1591, he received the added role of castle warden (城代 jōdai) of Ōzu Castle. Still later, joining Hideyoshi's expeditionary force at Hizen-Nagoya, Naoyori is said to have fought in Korea.

Naoyori fought on the side of Ishida Mitsunari in the Sekigahara Campaign, attacking Tsutsui Sadatsugu's castle of Iga-Ueno. Arrested following the Tokugawa victory, he was placed in the custody of Gamō Hideyuki after the battle. Later pardoned by Ieyasu, he was given a fief of 30,000 koku at Asō in Hitachi Province.
