= Iejima Airport =

Airport in Japan

Iejima Airport 伊江島空港
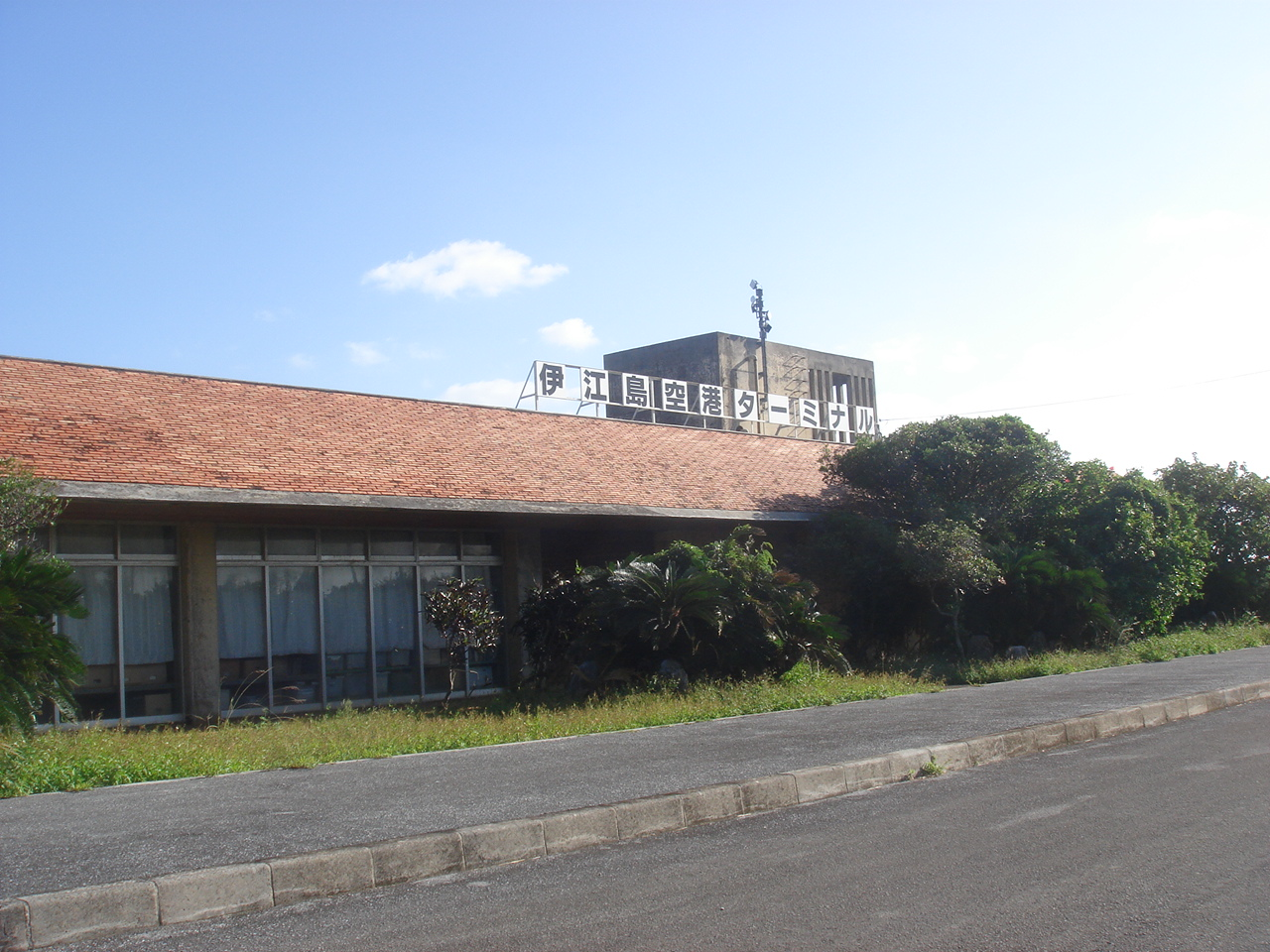
- IATA: IEJ; ICAO: RORE

Summary
- Airport type: Public
- Operator: Government
- Serves: Ie, Iejima, Japan
- Elevation AMSL: 238 ft (73 m)
- Coordinates: 26°43′21″N 127°47′13″E

Map
- Location within Okinawa Prefecture Location within Japan

Runways
Direction	Length		Surface
Direction	m	ft	Surface
04/22	1,500	4,921	Asphalt concrete

Statistics (2014)
- Passengers: 8
- Cargo (metric tonnes): 0
- Source: Japanese AIP at AIS Japan; Osaka Ministry of Land, Infrastructure and Transport Civil Aviation Bureau

Iejima Airport (伊江島空港, Iejima Kūkō) (IATA: IEJ, ICAO: RORE) is located on the island of Iejima in Ie, Kunigami District, Okinawa Prefecture, Japan. The runways were part of the Ie Shima Airfield complex built during World War II. In 2015, the government was planning for Iejima Airport to have a new terminal and to expand the runway to 2,000 meters in length to enable the airport to accommodate jet service.

== See also ==
- Naval Base Okinawa
