= Minna Island, Motobu =

Island within the Okinawa Islands of Japan

Minna Island
Minnajima
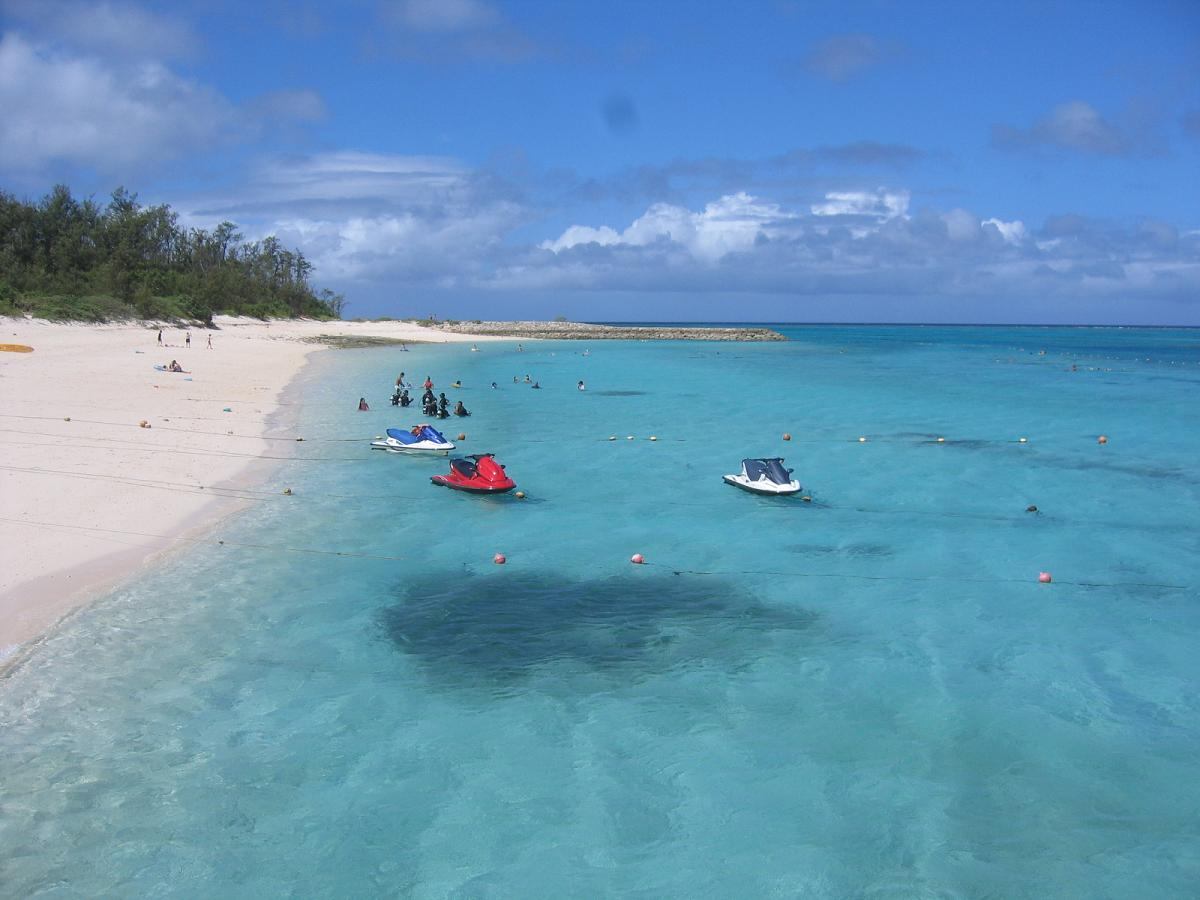
- Interactive map of Minna Island

Geography
- Coordinates: 26°38′50″N 127°49′04″E
- Archipelago: Okinawa Islands
- Adjacent to: East China Sea
- Area: 0.5 km^{2} (0.19 sq mi)

Administration
- Japan
- Prefecture: Okinawa
- District: Kunigami District
- Town: Motobu

Demographics
- Population: 18 (2025)

Minna Island (Japanese: 水納島, Hepburn: Minnajima) is a crescent-shaped island within the Okinawa Islands, under the administration of the town of Motobu in Kunigami District, Okinawa Prefecture, Japan. It is a popular destination for snorkeling.

The island, considered sacred by locals, was first settled at the turn of the 20th century by migrants from nearby Sesoko Island. As of 2025, it had 18 inhabitants.
