= Kiyohide Shinjō =

Okinawan karateka

Kiyohide Shinjo (新城 清秀, Shinjō Kiyohide; born November 3, 1951, Ie Island) is a nine-time All-Okinawa kata and kumite champion, and a 10th dan in Uechi Ryū karate. One of his most memorable moments was his three second knock out with a high toe kick. His success in Okinawan karate competition earned him the nickname "Okinawa's Superman".

Kiyohide Shinjo is the son and student of the late Seiyu Shinjo. Shinjo earned his shodan at the age of 16. After his father's death in 1981, Shinjo retired undefeated from karate competition and founded the Kenyukai Association within the Uechi Ryū Association. "Ken" means "fist", "yu" is derived from Seiyu Shinjo's name, and "kai" means "group" to give, "Seiyu Shinjo's strong fist group". At that time he also took over his father's dōjō in Kadena, Okinawa.

Shinjo has served on the Okinawa Karate Federation Board of Directors since 1980. He was elected chairman of that board for periods spanning 1991 through 1994, and he was the youngest person ever elected to that position.

In 2004, Shinjo moved his dōjō to Toguchi in Yomitan, Okinawa and has senior students all over the world.
