= Motobu =

Town in Okinawa Prefecture, Japan

Motobu 本部町
- Town
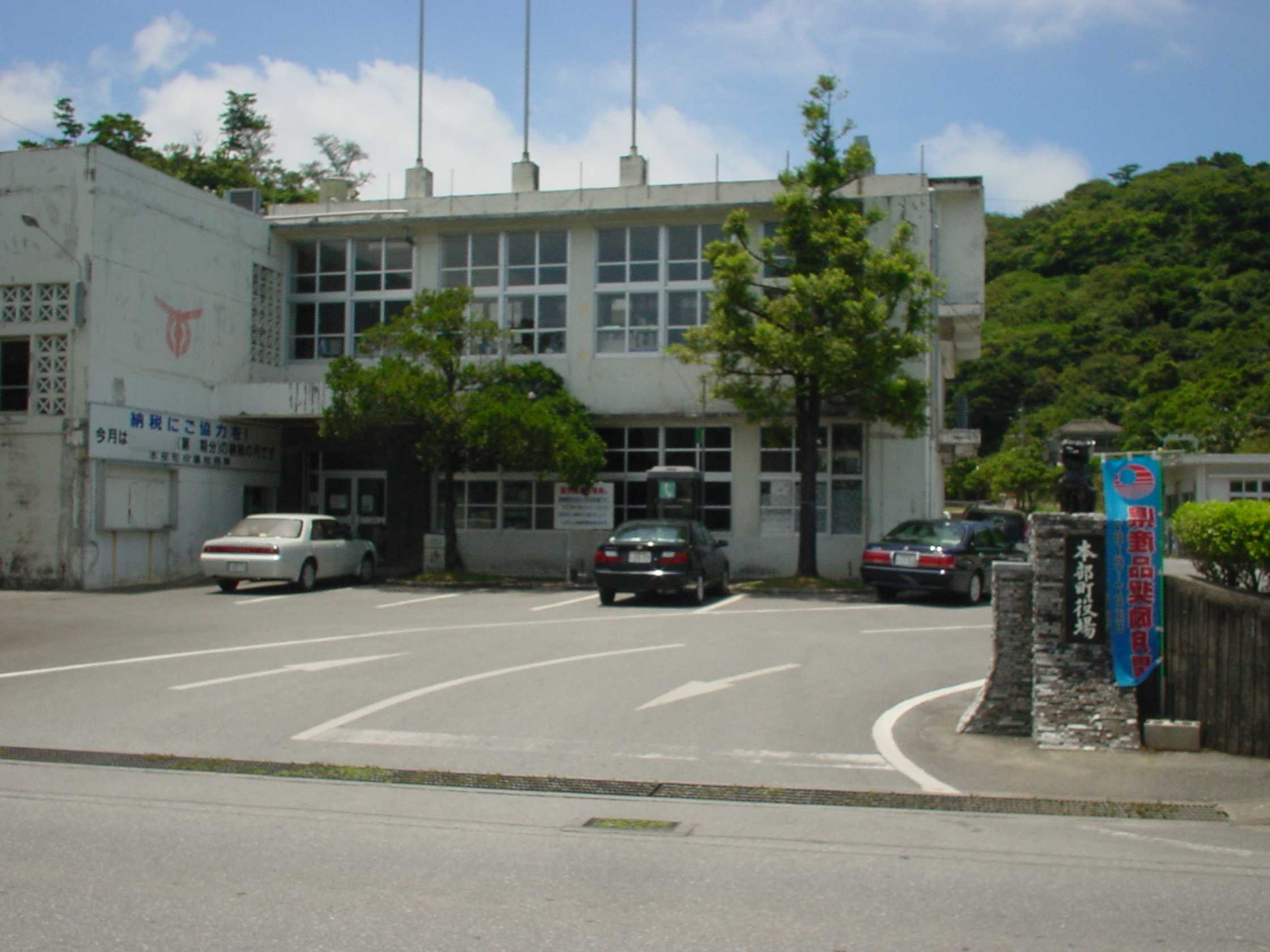
- Motobu Town Office

- Flag Emblem

- Location of Motobu in Okinawa Prefecture

- Location in Japan
- Coordinates: 26°39′29″N 127°53′53″E
- Country: Japan
- Region: Kyushu
- Prefecture: Okinawa Prefecture
- District: Kunigami

Area
  - Total: 54.30 km^{2} (20.97 sq mi)

Population (October 1, 2016)
  - Total: 13,441
  - Density: 247.5/km^{2} (641.1/sq mi)
- Time zone: UTC+09:00 (JST)
- City hall address: 5 Aza Higashi, Motobu-cho, Kunigami-gun; 905-0292
- Website: www.town.motobu.okinawa.jp(in Japanese)
- Symbols
- Bird: Ryūkyū scops owl
- Butterfly: Orange oakleaf, great nawab
- Flower: Orchid
- Tree: Fukugi (Garcinia subelliptica) and Sakura

Motobu (本部町, Motobu-chō; Kunigami and Okinawan: Mutubu) is a town located in Kunigami District, Okinawa Prefecture, Japan. As of October 2016, the town has an estimated population of 13,441 and a density of 250 persons per km^{2}. The total area is 54.30 square kilometres (20.97 mi^{2}).

Several islands can be accessed from Motobu, namely the small islands of Sesoko (by bridge) and Minna-jima (by ferry). Both islands are incorporated as part of the Town of Motobu. Ferry service also runs from Motobu Port to Ie-jima. Motobu is served by three large supermarkets and eight individual schools from elementary to high school levels.

Like many towns in Okinawa, Motobu is composed of what were formerly several smaller and independent villages. In addition to Motobu proper other included districts are Sesoko, Kamimotobu, Sakimotobu and Izumi.

The well-known Okinawa Churaumi Aquarium is located in Motobu. Other notable sites include the remains of Nakijin Castle, as well as several cafes.

== Geography ==
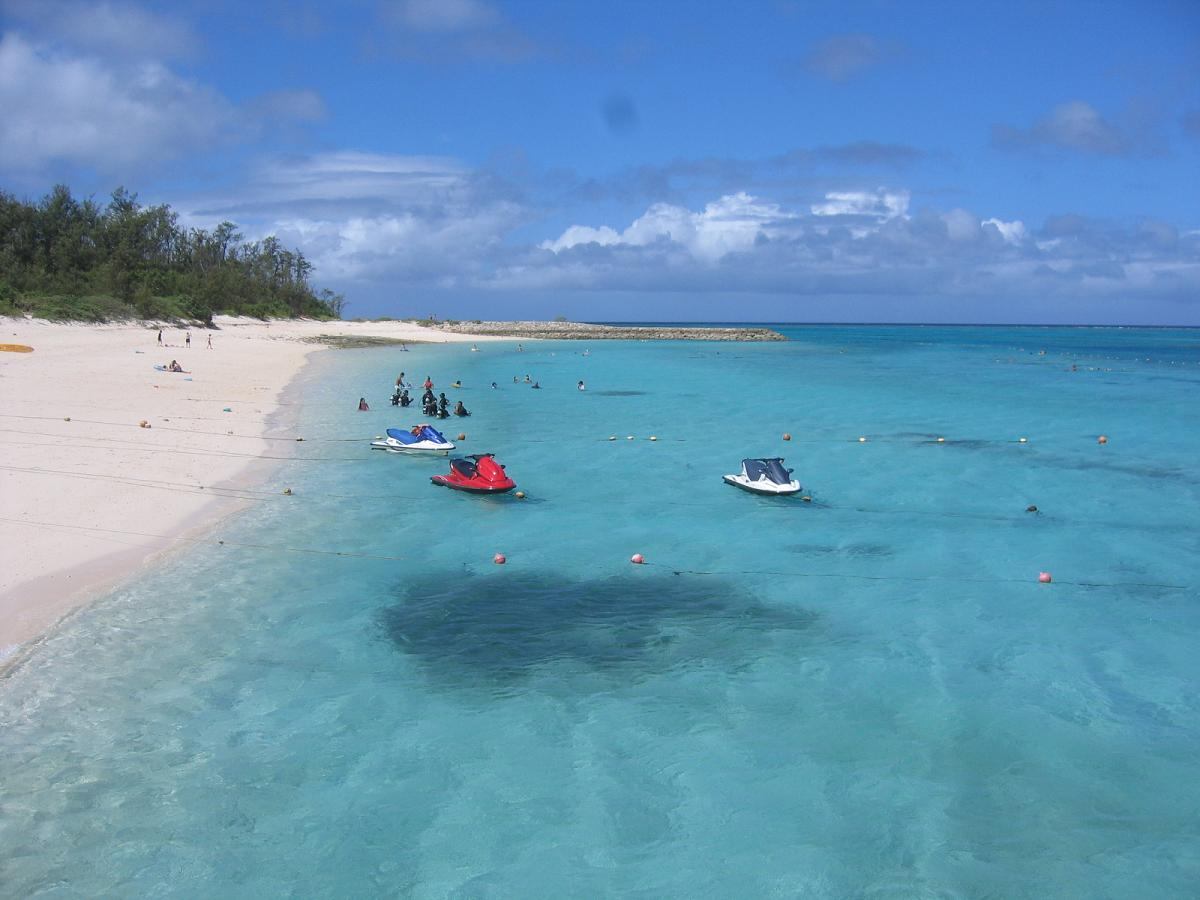
Minnajima Beach on the island of Minnajima in Motobu

The town of Motobu sits on the northern part of Okinawa Island. The town occupies the western part of the Motobu Peninsula as well as two islands: Minnajima and Sesokojima. Motobu is bordered by Nago to the south, Nakijin to the east, and by the East China Sea to the west.

The Minna River (6.5 kilometres (4.0 mi)) runs from the center of the Motobu Peninsula through the town and empties into the East China Sea at the small Toguchi Bay. Coral around the entrance of the bay was removed to create a natural shipping channel into the bay, and the town center is concentrated in this area.

There are beaches with white sand and clear water such as Minnajima Beach.

=== Administrative divisions ===
The town includes twenty-seven wards.

- Bise (備瀬)
- Furujima (古島)
- Gushiken (具志堅)
- Hamamoto (浜元)
- Henachi (辺名地)
- Higashi (東)
- Inoha (伊野波)
- Ishikawa (石川)
- Izumi (伊豆味)
- Janaha (謝花)
- Katsuu (嘉津宇)
- Kenken (健堅)
- Kitazato (北里)
- Namizato (並里)
- Nobaru (野原)
- Ōhama (大浜)
- Ōkayō (大嘉陽)
- Sakimotobu (崎本部)
- Sesoko (瀬底)
- Shinzato (新里)
- Tancha (谷茶)
- Toguchi (渡久地)
- Toyohara (豊原)
- Ufudō (大堂)
- Urasaki (浦崎)
- Yamakawa (山川)
- Yamazato (山里)

== Parks ==
The Omoro Botanical Garden and Tropical & Subtropical Arboretum are located in the northern portion of this town.

== History ==
Motobu magiri covered the area of the present-day town. The magiri, a type of regional administrative district, were abolished under Imperial Edict 46 in 1907, and the Town of Motobu was incorporated in 1908.

== Ocean Expo 1975 ==
In 1975, the World Exposition was held in Motobu, with a focus on the world's oceans. After the expo concluded, Ocean Expo Park was built on the site. Ocean Expo Park is the site of the Okinawa Churaumi Aquarium as well as other exhibits highlighting the Okinawa Island and its culture.

== Okinawa Churaumi Aquarium ==
The Okinawa Churaumi Aquarium is located within the Ocean Expo Commemorative National Government Park. The aquarium consists of four floors, with tanks containing deep sea creatures, sharks, coral and tropical fish. The aquarium sits on 19,000 square metres (200,000 ft^{2}) of land, with a total of 77 tanks containing 10,000 cubic metres (350,000 ft^{3}) of water. The main tank, called the Kuroshio Sea, holds 7,500 cubic metres (1,981,000 US gal) of water and features an acrylic glass panel measuring 8.2 by 22.5 metres (27 by 74 ft) with a thickness of 60 centimetres (24 in). The aquarium was the world's largest until the construction of the Georgia Aquarium in Atlanta, Georgia. The aquarium additionally holds 80 species of coral. The Okinawa Churaumi Aquarium is one of only a few aquariums that keeps and attempts to breed whale sharks in captivity.

== Education ==
Motobu High School, a public high school operated by the Okinawa Prefectural Board of Education, serves the area.

- Located on Sesoko Island is another high school for the severely disabled

Motobu's public elementary and junior high schools are run under the guidance of the Motobu Board of Education located in Ohama Town, central Motobu. The Board also serves as a meeting place, art exhibit, English class, and a venue for other various town events.

Public elementary and junior high schools are:

- Motobu Junior High School (本部中学校), located in Ohama Town, central Motobu
- Motobu Elementary School (本部小学校), located in Ohama Town, central Motobu
- Kamimotobu Gakuen (上本部学園) – Kamimotobu Junior High School (上本部中学校) and Kamimotobu Elementary School (上本部小学校) – located in Yamagawa Town near the Churaumi Aquarium
- Minna Elementary and Junior High School (水納小中学校) – On Minna-Jimma serving the residing 5 students of the island, in view of Toguchi port. 25 minute ferry
- Sesoko Elementary School (瀬底小学校) – located on Sesoko Island
- Izumi Elementary and Junior High School (伊豆味小中学校) – located near Nakijin Town

Former schools:

- Sakimotobu Elementary School (崎本部小学校), located on the outskirts of Ohama Town
- Sesoko Elementary School was formerly Sesoko Elementary and Junior High School (瀬底小中学校)

Private schools:

- Yashima Gakuen University International High School, a private school, is located in Motobu.

== Transportation ==
Motobu is located between the towns of Nakajin and Nago and can be reached by either route 449 or 84.

== Port ==
There are plans to expand the pier in Motobu, and deepen the port. As ships of only up to 20,000 tons can dock at the port, only two cruise ships visited in 2014 and one in 2015. The expansion of the pier would allow larger cruise ships, especially carrying Chinese tourists, to dock. Berths at Naha port are limited and docking requests have been rejected for this reason.

== Notable residents ==
- Fumiko Nakamura (1913–2013), educator and peace activist.

== Cultural Properties ==
- Name (Japanese) (Type of registration)

=== Cultural Properties ===
- Kinkin Ufuya (Kenken-no-hiya)'s tomb (健堅大親（健堅之比屋）の墓)
- Nakamura Family Documents (仲村家文書) (Prefectural)
- Sesoko Ōhashi Bridge (瀬底大橋)
- Sesoko Tiitinku Enclosure (瀬底土帝君一郭) (National)
- Toguchi Bridge (渡久地橋)

=== Folk Cultural Properties ===
- Bise Uganju Praying Site (備瀬の拝所)
- Gushikawa Utaki Sacred Site (具志川御嶽)
- Gushiken Kami-Hasāgi (具志堅の神ハサーギ) (Municipal)
- Gushiken Settlement (具志堅の村落)
- Jūfuni-mō meadows (ジューフニ毛)
- Sesoko Noro kanzashi and magatama (瀬底祝女の簪と勾玉) (Municipal)
- Sesoko Utaki Sacred Site (瀬底御嶽)
- Toguchi Shrine (渡久地神社)

=== Historic Sites ===
- Banjo Guards House Site (番所跡)
- Gushiken Shell Mound (具志堅貝塚)
- Hamamoto Sachipin Shell Mound (浜元サチビン貝塚) (Prefectural)
- Motobu Observation Post Site (本部監視哨跡) (Municipal)
- Sesoko Shell Mound (瀬底貝塚)
- Shinsue Brigade Tunnel Site (清末隊壕跡)
- Yaedake Campaign Hospital Site (八重岳野戦病院跡)
- Yamakawa Kakiuchi Gongen (Hachinuchi-gunjin) Cave Site (山川垣内権現洞穴遺跡 (ハチヌチグンジン)) (Prefectural)
- Yamakawa Minatobaru Site (山川港原遺跡) (Prefectural)

=== Places of scenic beauty ===
- Fukugi tree lanes in Bise (備瀬の福木)
- Mount Yae's cherry trees (八重岳の桜)

=== Natural Monuments ===
- Motobu Ōishibaru ammonite fossils (本部町大石原のアンモナイト化石) (Prefectural)
- Mount Katsuu, Mount Awa, and Mount Yae Nature Reserve (嘉津宇岳安和岳八重岳自然保護区) (Prefectural)
- Ōhama foraminiferal limestone (大浜の有孔虫石灰岩) (Municipal)
- Shiokawa River (塩川) (National)
- Yamazato conical karst formations (山里の円錐カルスト)
