= Never End =

Never End may refer to:

- "Never End" (song), by Namie Amuro, 2000
- Never End, a novel by Åke Edwardson

== See also ==
- "Neva End", a 2012 song by Future
