= Henoko =

Henoko 辺野古
- Neighbourhood
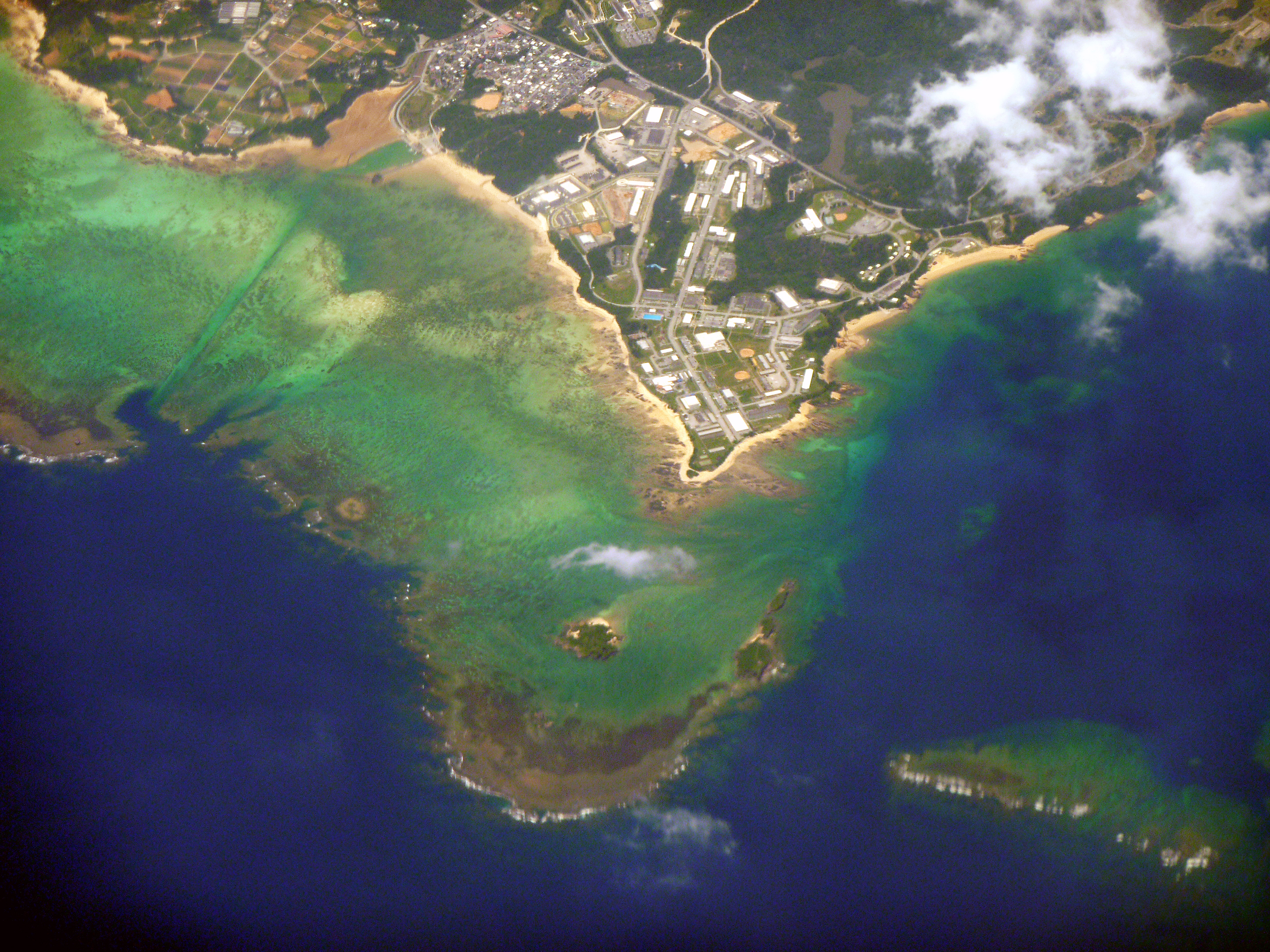
- Aerial view of Henoko

- Coordinates: 26°31′23.5″N 128°1′56.7″E
- Country: Japan
- Region: Kyushu
- Prefecture: Okinawa
- City: Nago

Area
  - Total: 10.83 km^{2} (4.18 sq mi)
- Time zone: UTC+9 (Japan Standard Time)

Henoko (辺野古) is one of the fifty-six neighbourhoods of Nago, Japan, located in the east coast of the city. The majority of the area is occupied by two United States Marine Corps bases, Camp Schwab and the Henoko Ammunition Depot. Reclamation of Oura Bay is also underway for the construction of a replacement facility for Marine Corps Air Station Futenma in Ginowan. It borders Futami to the north and Toyohara to the south. However, the only road connecting Futami and Toyohara is Japan National Route 329, which crosses Camp Schwab. It also borders Yofuke and Sukuda, but direct travel is impossible due to the large division caused by Camp Schwab. It is possible to travel to Yofuke via Futami. Okinawa National College of Technology, the only higher college in Okinawa Prefecture, is located in the ward.

== History ==
Although artifacts from the shell midden period have been found at the Yanibama artifact site and the Oshihara shell midden within Camp Schwab, investigations have not progressed due to their location within the base. There are currently eight known archaeological sites in the Henoko district: the Oshihara site, the Omata site, the Oshihara Nagasaku artifact site, the Oshihara stone tool excavation site, the Yanibama artifact site, the Mishagawa settlement-related sites, the Ourasaki internment camp site, and the Nagasaki Kanehisa artifact site. However, excavation work is difficult due to the sites being located within the base or in areas slated for reclamation, and generally, excavated artifacts cannot be taken out of the base.

During the Second Shō dynasty of the Ryukyu Kingdom, starting in the 15th century, a post road called the "Kunigami-kata Tokaido" was developed.

=== Battle of Okinawa and Oura-saki Internment Camp ===
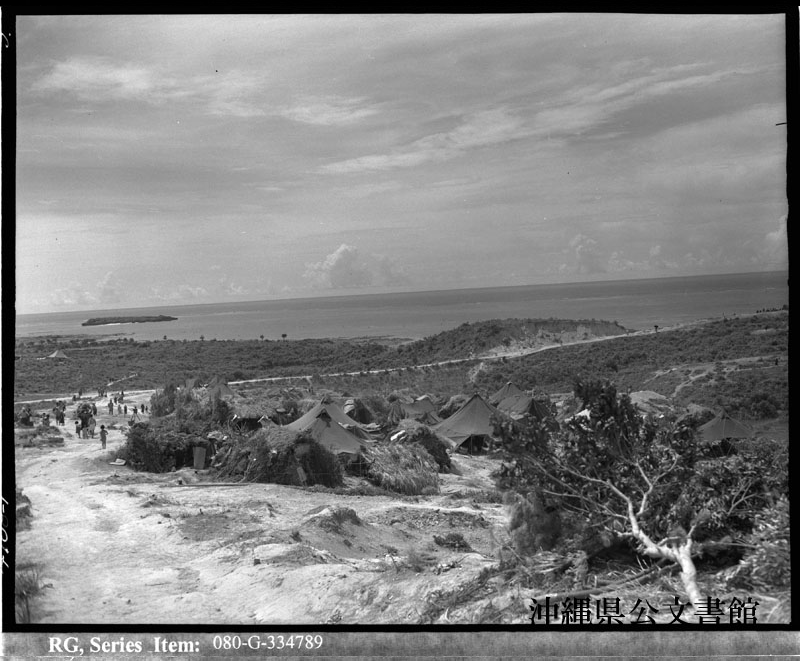
Oura-saki Internment Camp

On April 5, 1945, the U.S. military was stationed in Nagasakihara, Henoko. In June, the U.S. military established the Oura-saki internment camp to forcibly detain residents of Iejima, Nakijin, and Motobu who had been captured. At its peak, 25,000 people were held there, and it was one of the worst internment camps in the northwest, where many lives were lost due to war wounds, starvation, and diseases such as malaria. The residents who were transferred were placed in barren wasteland with almost no trees, and the tents provided by the U.S. military were insufficient, resulting in a severe food shortage where "people went out to sea to eat seaweed and went to the mountains to pick and eat any leaves and grass they could find that seemed edible." The forced internment of residents at Oura-saki lasted for one year. Subsequently, a large-scale recovery of remains was carried out in the 1980s at the Shibuta Community Cemetery on the Ginoza Village side of the internment camp. However, regarding the Oura-saki internment camp, it was re-seized as Camp Schwab in 1956, 10 years after the camp's demise, making it extremely difficult to identify burial sites and recover remains. According to the Okinawa Prefectural Peace Memorial Museum, approximately 304 victims associated with Oura-saki have been identified, but their burial sites have not been confirmed.

=== Construction of Camp Schwab ===
On January 28, 1955, the United States Civil Administration of the Ryukyu Islands, the governing body of the U.S. military, notified Kushi Village that it would conduct live-fire exercises in the forests of Henoko-dake and Kushi-dake. However, the residents, who had traditionally relied on forestry for their livelihoods, such as charcoal making and camphor production, opposed the exercises due to their strong concerns that the live-fire exercises would result in the forests, which were their source of income, being closed to the public or destroyed by fire. On March 4, the Civil Administration initially withdrew its use of the exercise site in response to the opposition, but on July 22, it notified the village that it would seize the forests as military land, and "strongly warned that if they continued to oppose the exercises, the village area would also be demarcated as seized land, and forced evictions would be imposed, and no compensation would be offered whatsoever."

On December 28, 1956, a land use agreement was signed with Mayor Kushi at the Rycom (military headquarters) office. The following day, on the 29th, Major Harry Apple of the Marine Corps and others attended a meeting at the Henoko district office to report on the process leading up to the military land lease agreement. The village's conditions were confirmed, including a five-year lease term, the responsibility for fair compensation and all damages, the possibility of farming in areas within the red-light zone where possible, and the permission to deliver firewood and charcoal as much as possible.

Construction was awarded to the Osaka-based Zenitaka Corporation, and construction of Camp Schwab was largely completed in August 1959. During this period, in addition to the old settlement along the coast, a new settlement was built on the hillside by clearing the mountains, and a restaurant district was created for the base construction workers. After completion, it became the base's entertainment district, known as "Henoko Social District." The base was said to have the best underground ammunition storage facility in the Far East, as well as a U.S. Army nuclear storage facility.

=== Vietnam War ===
During the Vietnam War, in the 1960s, particularly from 1965 to 1975, Camp Schwab served as a base for U.S. military operations, and the neighboring town of Henoko became a bustling entertainment district known as "Apple Town". It is said that there were more than 200 bars and restaurants, and many people moved to Henoko not only from Okinawa Island but also from Amami.

After the Vietnam War, the economic prosperity brought about by the military bases, backed by an unusually high dollar, could no longer be expected.

=== Recent years ===
Construction of the Henoko reclamation seawall began in 2017.

In response to the construction of the replacement facility for Futenma Air Base, maritime protests have also been held in the waters surrounding Henoko.

On June 28, 2024, near the exit of the Anwa pier, a woman in her 70s protesting jumped into the roadway as a dump truck was carrying soil for construction work. She and a male security guard in his 40s who tried to stop her were both run over by the dump truck, resulting in the death of the security guard and a broken leg for the woman, in what became known as the Henoko dump truck accident.

On March 16, 2026, the Henoko Offshore Protest Boat Capsizing Accident occurred when students from Doshisha International High School, on a training trip, boarded a protest boat owned by the Anti-Helicopter Base Council from the breakwater of Henoko Fishing Port. The two boats capsized, throwing several students overboard and killing two people. Shinichi Tokuda, head of the Henoko ward, criticized the incident, saying that the maritime tour was far removed from peace education and demanded the removal of the tent village.

== Geography ==
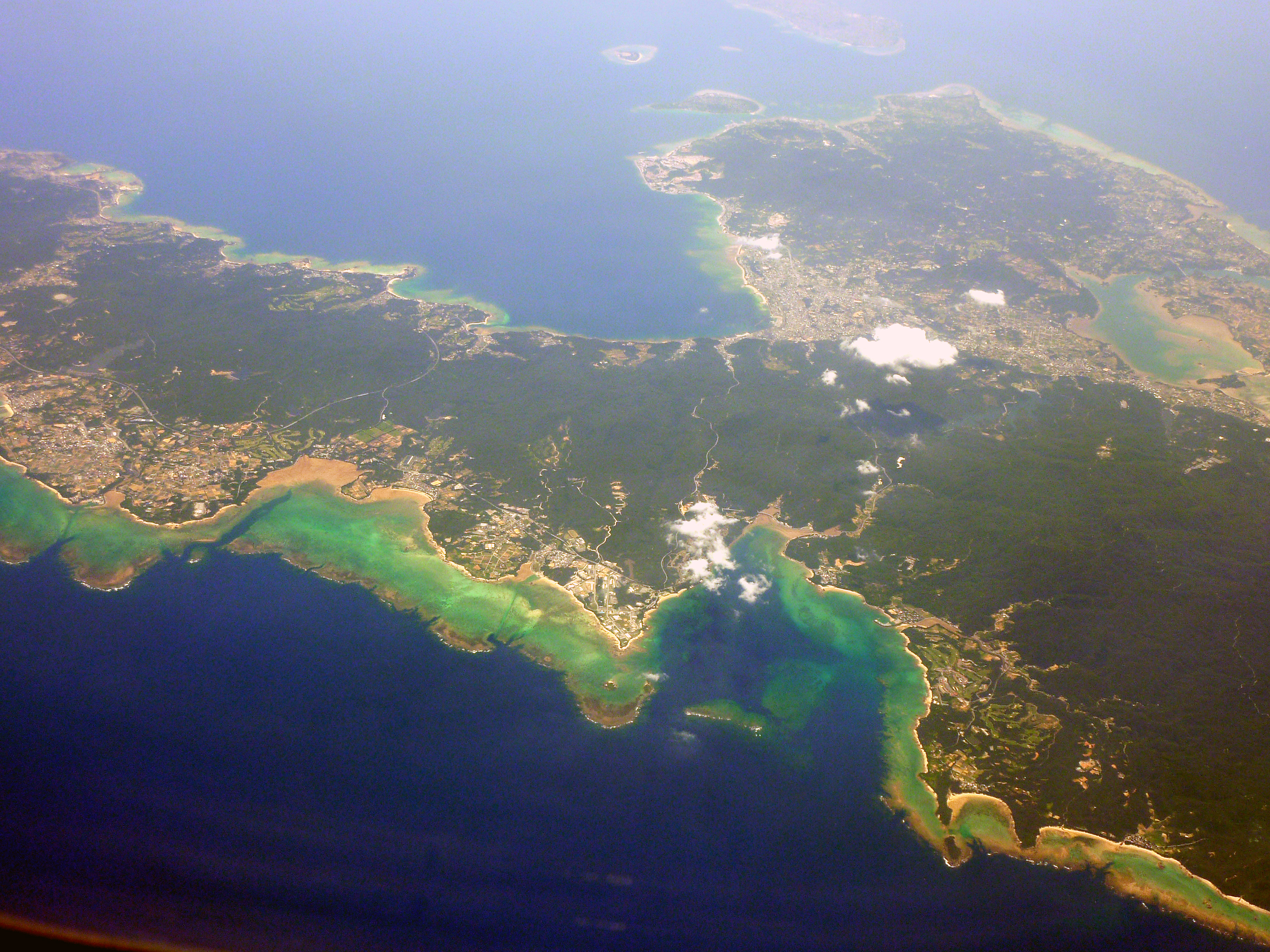
A distant view of the area around Nago City. Henoko Cape is at the bottom center.

Henoko is located in eastern Nago City and with an area of 10.83 km². In 2020, it had a population of 1,087 households and 1,776 people.
