= 26th G8 summit =

2000 international leader meeting in Japan

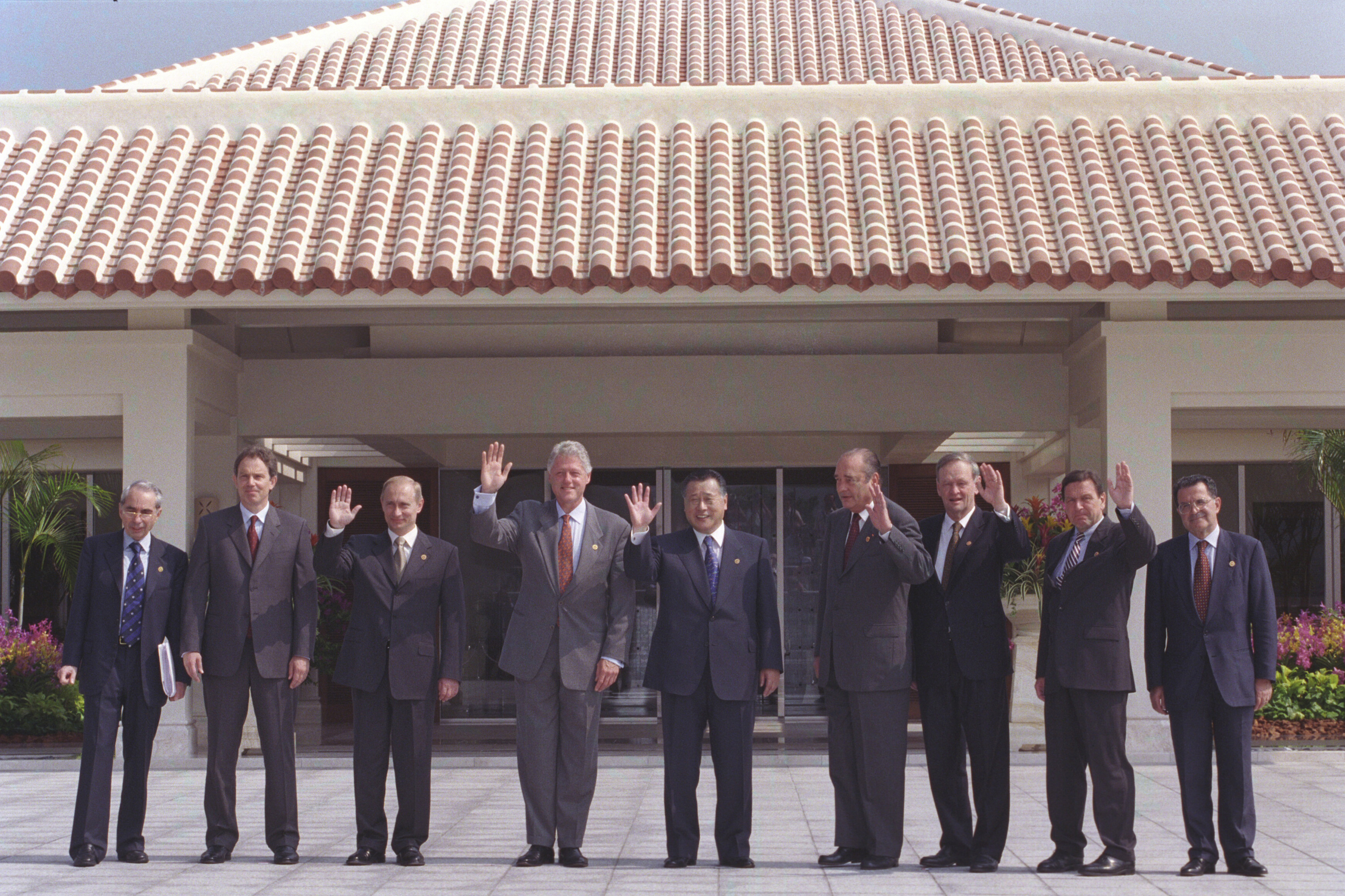
- Host country: Japan
- Dates: 21–23 July 2000
- Cities: Nago
- Venues: Bankoku Shinryokan
- Participants: Canada; France; Germany; Italy; Japan; Russia; United Kingdom; United States; European Union
- Follows: 25th G8 summit
- Precedes: 27th G8 summit

The 26th G8 summit was held in Nago, Okinawa Prefecture, Japan, on 21–23 July 2000.

== Overview ==
The Group of Seven (G7) was an unofficial forum which brought together the heads of the richest industrialized countries: France, Germany, Italy, Japan, the United Kingdom, the United States, and Canada starting in 1976. The G8, meeting for the first time in 1997, was formed with the addition of Russia. In addition, the President of the European Commission has been formally included in summits since 1981. The summits were not meant to be linked formally with wider international institutions; and in fact, a mild rebellion against the stiff formality of other international meetings was a part of the genesis of cooperation between France's president Valéry Giscard d'Estaing and West Germany's chancellor Helmut Schmidt as they conceived the initial summit of the Group of Six (G6) in 1975.

The G8 summits during the 21st century have inspired widespread debates, protests, and demonstrations; and the two- or three-day event becomes more than the sum of its parts, elevating the participants, the issues, and the venue as focal points for activist pressure.

== Ice hockey game: Canada vs. Japan ==
In conjunction with Kyushu-Okinawa summit, a Canadian team played the local Haebaru Dragonfires in a friendly. On 21 July, the teams played the only ice rink on the island and in spite of above-35 °C weather. About 4,500 Okinawan residents were in attendance and very keen ice hockey fans who are proud of their arena and their tradition of ice hockey in spite of being a remote tropical island. Canadian Prime Minister Jean Chrétien skated in the pre-game warm-up and performed the ceremonial puck drop. The Canadian team beat the Haebaru Dragonfires quite handily. Leading scorers were Andrew Donnelly, Canada (4 goals) and Paul Sabourin, Canada (3 goals). Following the game the teams engaged in a ceremonial jersey exchange. The mayor of Haebaru Town said "inviting the Prime Minister is a chance to strengthen the roots of ice hockey in Haebaru Town, while promoting stronger cross-cultural ties with Canada in the future."

== Leaders at the summit ==
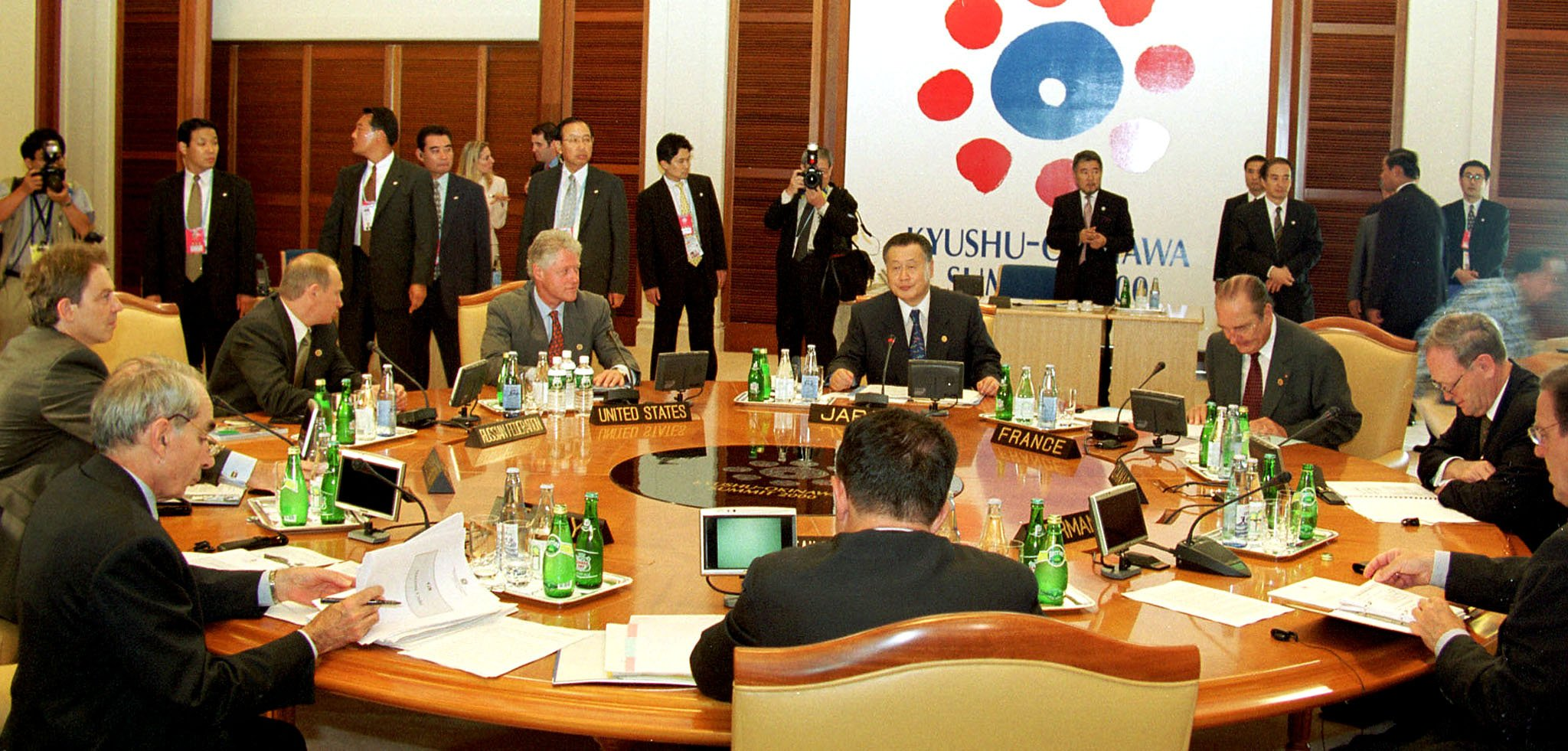
Meeting session on 22 July 2000

The 26th G8 summit was the first summit for Russian President Vladimir Putin, and was the last summit for Italian Prime Minister Giuliano Amato and US President Bill Clinton. It was also the first and only summit for Japanese Prime Minister Yoshirō Mori.

=== Participants ===
These summit participants were the current "core members" of the international forum:

**Core G8 members** Host state and leader are shown in bold text.
Member		Represented by	Title
(Canada)	Canada	Jean Chrétien	Prime Minister
(France)	France	Jacques Chirac	President
(Germany)	Germany	Gerhard Schröder	Chancellor
(Italy)	Italy	Giuliano Amato	Prime Minister
(Japan)	**Japan**	**Yoshirō Mori**	**Prime Minister**
(Russia)	Russia	Vladimir Putin	President
(United Kingdom)	United Kingdom	Tony Blair	Prime Minister
(United States)	United States	Bill Clinton	President
(European Union)	European Union	Romano Prodi	Commission President
(European Union)	European Union	Jacques Chirac	Council President

== Priorities ==
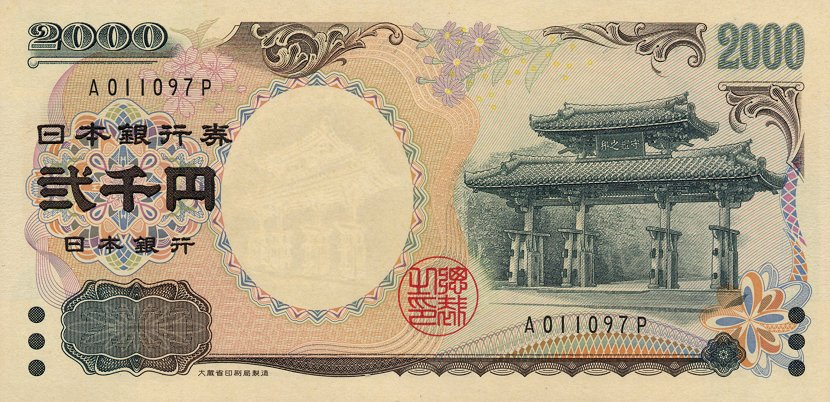
2000 Japanese yen note featuring Shureimon in commemoration of the summit

Traditionally, the host country of the G8 summit sets the agenda for negotiations, which take place primarily amongst multi-national civil servants in the weeks before the summit itself, leading to a joint declaration which all countries can agree to sign.

== Issues ==
The summit was intended as a venue for resolving differences among its members. As a practical matter, the summit was also conceived as an opportunity for its members to give each other mutual encouragement in the face of difficult economic decisions.

== Agenda ==
Global health was first introduced as an agenda at this G8 summit in 2000.

== Business opportunity ==
For some, the G8 summit became a profit-generating event; as for example, the official G8 Summit magazines which have been published under the auspices of the host nations for distribution to all attendees since 1998.

A picture of Shureimon appears on the Japanese 2,000 yen note, released in 2000 in commemoration of the summit in Okinawa; and the Japanese government encountered criticism for having spent more than $750 million to hold this event.

Namie Amuro's song "Never End" was made for the summit.

== Gallery of participating leaders ==
=== Core G8 participants ===
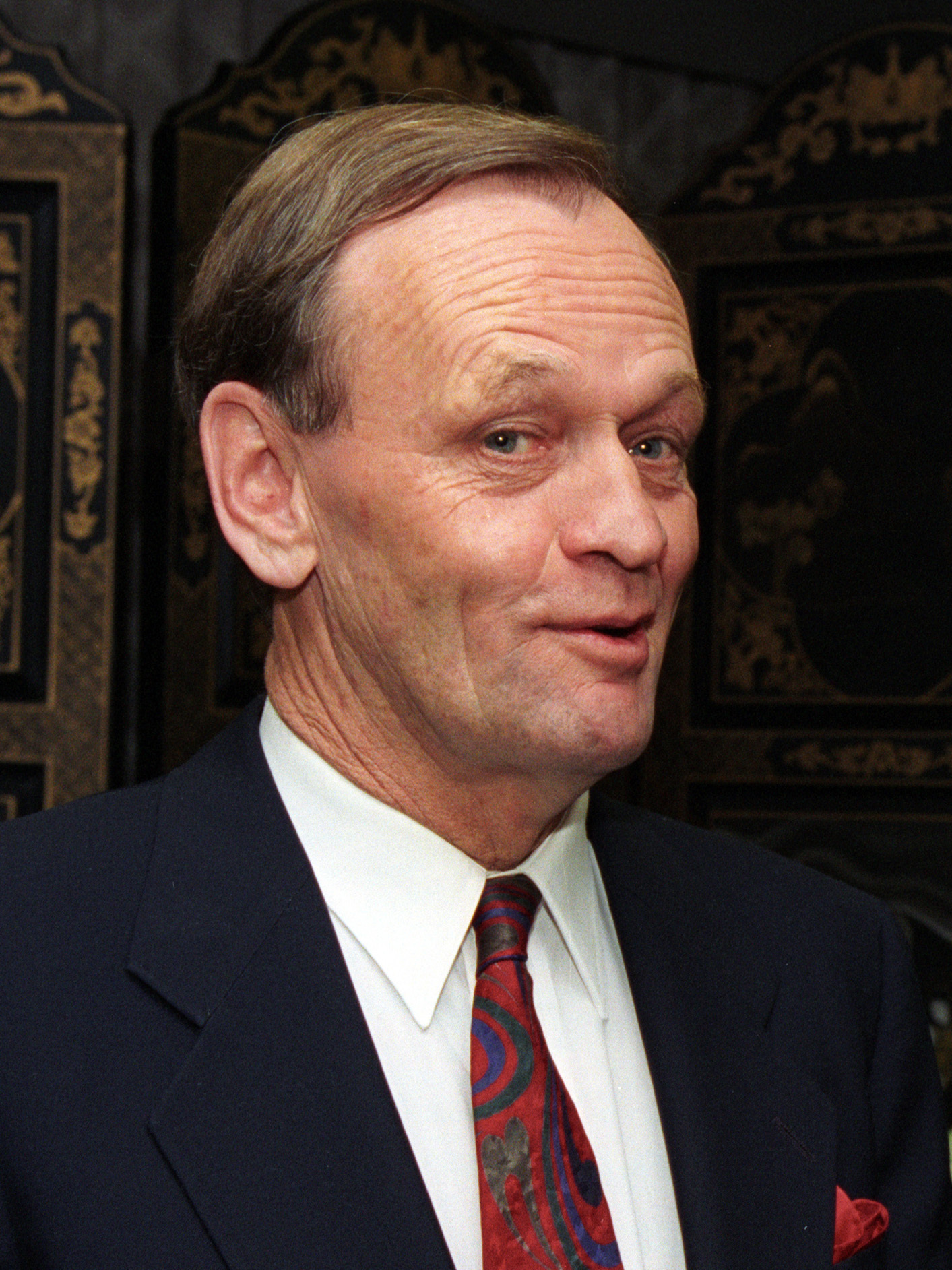
(Canada) Canada
Jean Chrétien,
Prime Minister

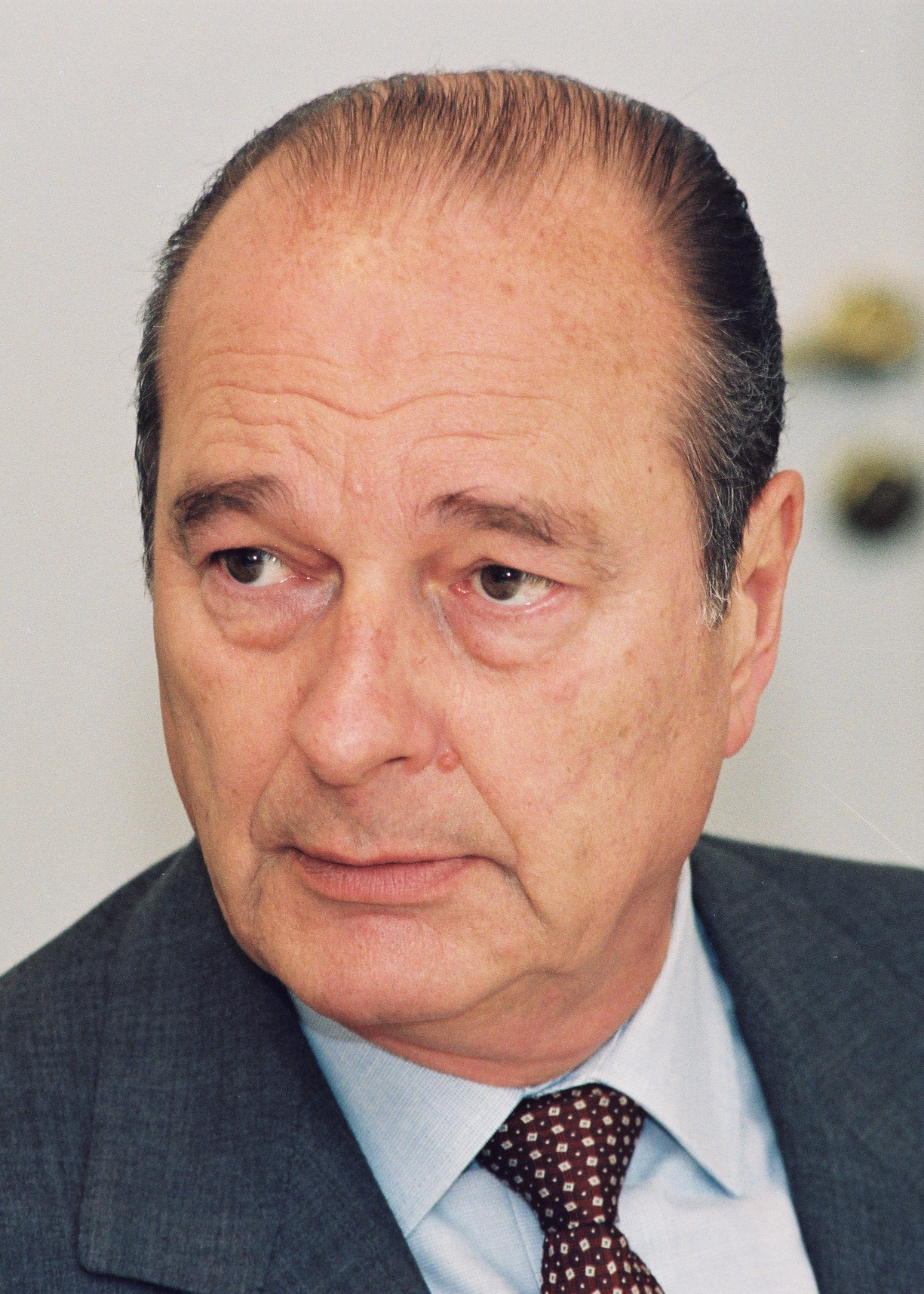
(France) France
Jacques Chirac,
President

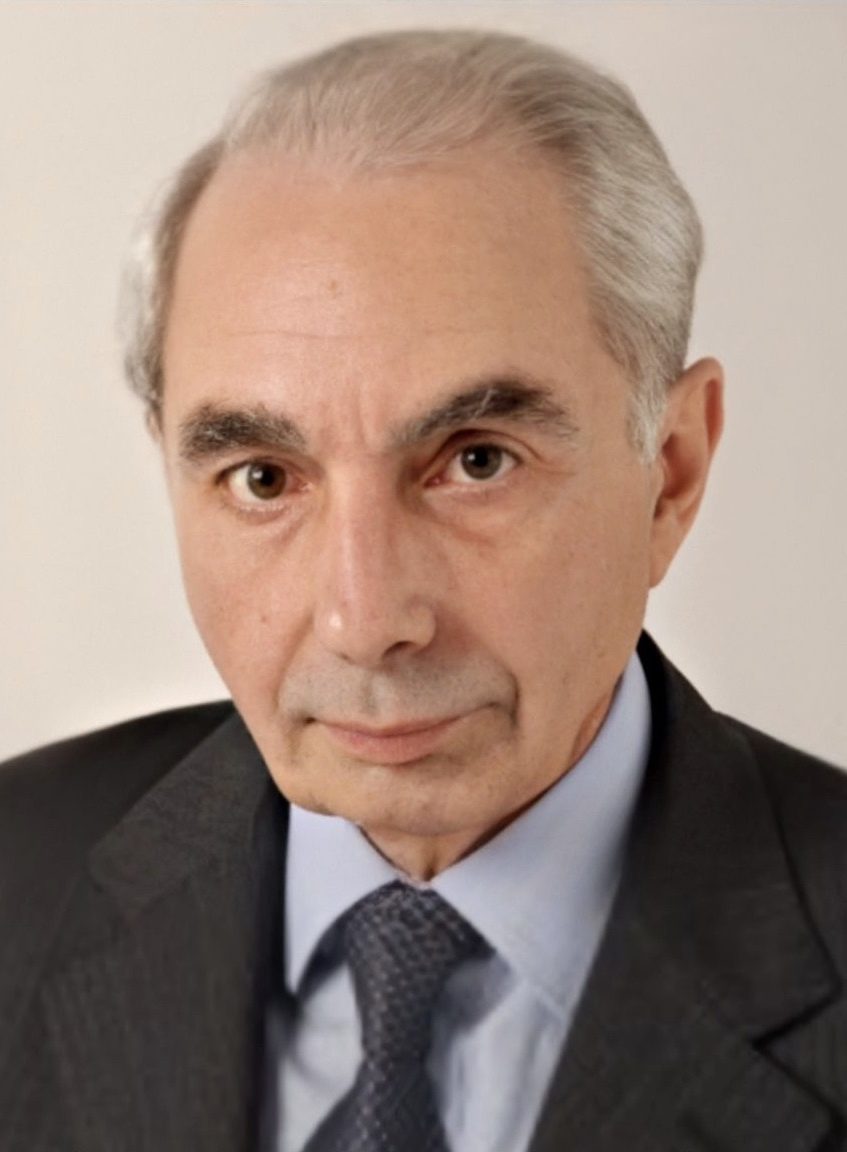
(Italy) Italy
Giuliano Amato,
Prime Minister

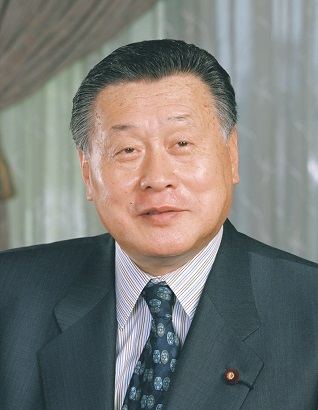
(Japan) Japan
Yoshiro Mori,
Prime Minister (Host)

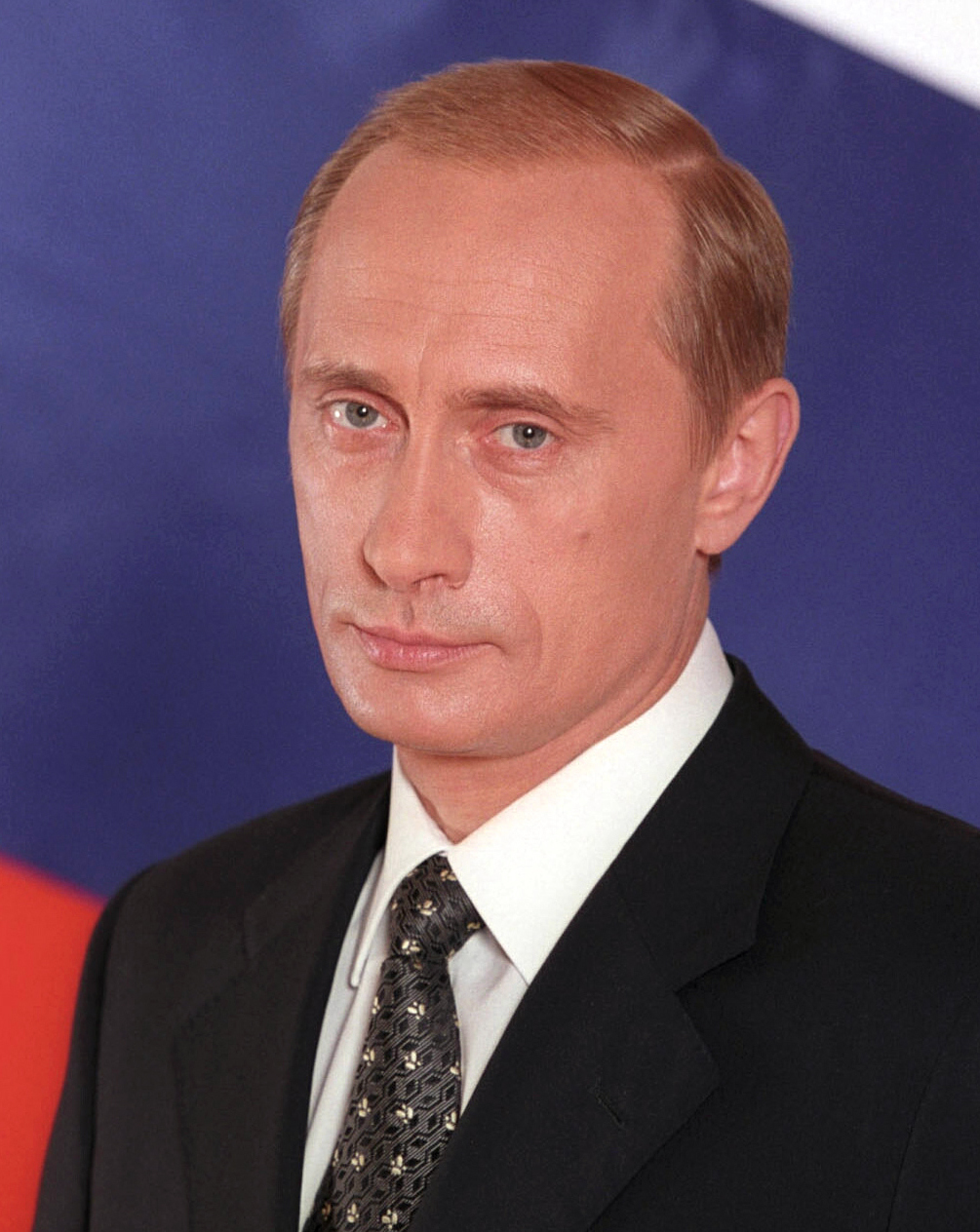
(Russia) Russia
Vladimir Putin,
President

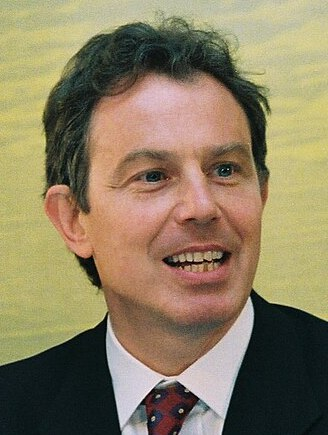
(United Kingdom) United Kingdom
Tony Blair,
Prime Minister

(United States) United States
Bill Clinton,
President
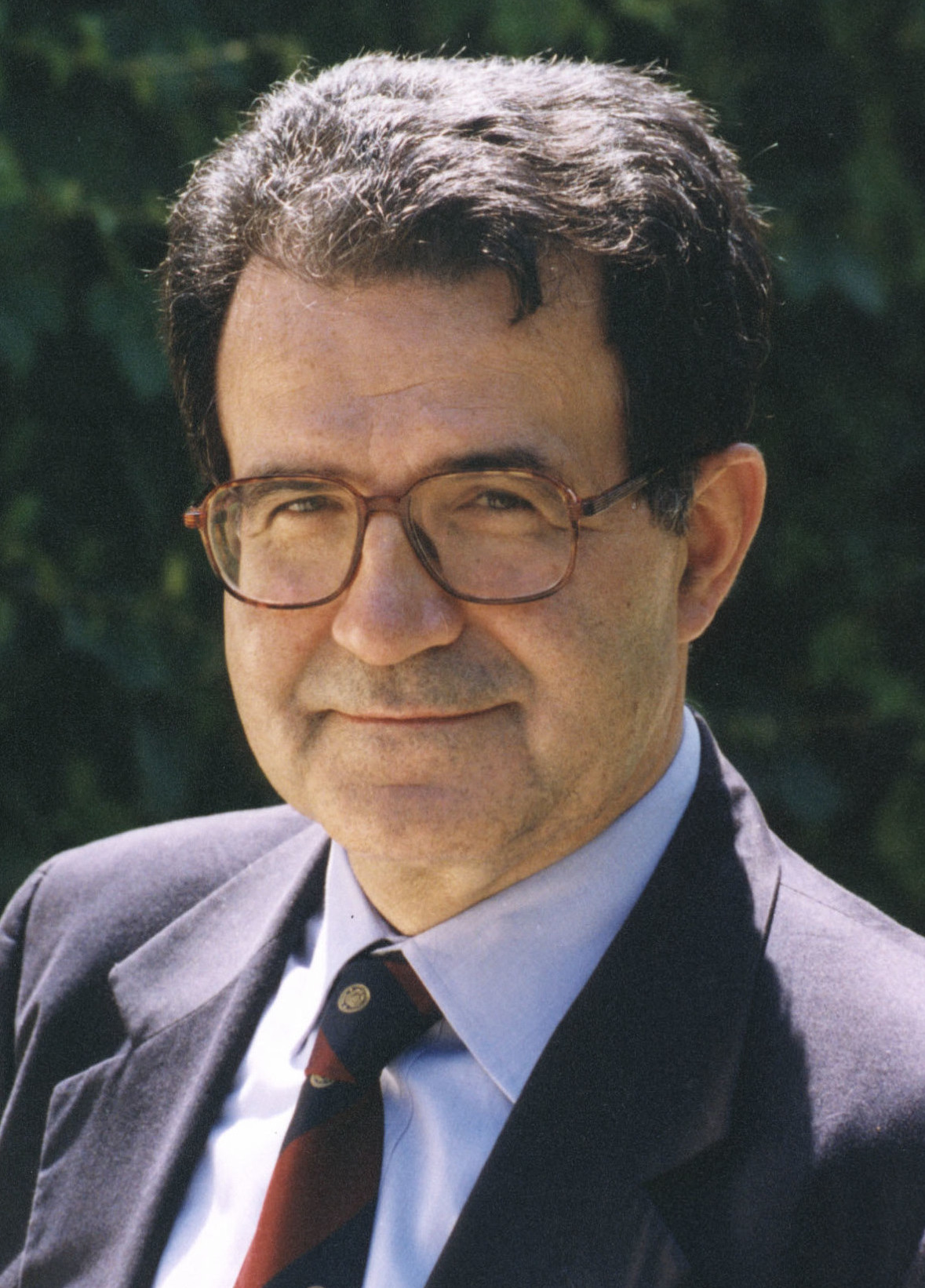
(European Union) European Union
Romano Prodi,
Commission President
