= Never End (song) =

2000 single by Namie Amuro

Single by Namie Amuro

from the album Break the Rules
- Released: July 12, 2000
- Recorded: June 4–5, 2000 Los Angeles, US; June 15, 2000 (re-recorded)
- Studio: The Hit Factory; True Kiss Disc; Record One; Ajima Studio; On Air Azabu Studio; Guillaume Tell; Stanley House
- Length: 25:04
- Label: Avex Trax
- Songwriter: Tetsuya Komuro
- Producer: Tetsuya Komuro

Namie Amuro singles chronology
"Love 2000" (2000)	"Never End" (2000)	"Please Smile Again" (2000)

"Never End" is a song by Japanese recording artist Namie Amuro. It was released on July 12, 2000, as the lead single from her fifth studio album Break the Rules (2000). The track was made specifically for the 26th G8 summit that took place in Amuro's home prefecture Okinawa during July of that year. "Never End" was written, composed and arranged solely by her long-time producer Tetsuya Komuro. Musically, it is a pop ballad that takes influences from Okinawan music. Lyrically, the song describes distant memories, distant places, and distant emotions, indicating a longing for connection and understanding.

Music critics praised Amuro's vocals on the song as well as its composition. Commercially, it performed well in Japan, peaking at number two on the Oricon Singles Chart, becoming Amuro's 16th consecutive top ten solo single and receiving a double platinum certification from the Recording Industry Association of Japan (RIAJ). "Never End" was Amuro's last CD single to premiere with over 100,000 copies in sales until "60s 70s 80s" eight years later.

Masashi Mutō directed the music video for the single, which appeared on her video albums Filmography (2001) and Best Clips (2002). It was also featured on the set lists of several of Amuro concerts and subsequent live releases. "Never End" has been reworked and re-recorded for Amuro's second greatest hits album, Love Enhanced Single Collection, released in 2002, as well as her final greatest hits album, Finally (2017).

== Background and composition ==
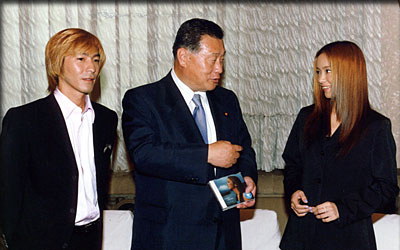
Komuro and Amuro presenting a CD single to Prime Minister Yoshiro Mori at the Prime Minister's Office on July 11, 2000

The inspiration for "Never End" came about in January 2000, when Tetsuya Komuro, who was in Fukuoka on tour with globe at the time, was asked by the late former Prime Minister Keizō Obuchi over the phone to compose an image song for the 26th G8 summit (summit meeting of major countries) as the general music producer for the summit. At the same time, he also received an order saying, "We really want Amuro to sing for us." Afterwards, the song was completed, but after Obuchi's sudden death, the bright tone of the song was changed to that of the final product, and the tune was reworked. The master tape of the completed song was dedicated to Obuchi's joint funeral on June 8 of the same year. Upon completion of the song, the CD single was presented to then Prime Minister Yoshirō Mori.

During the production process, Komuro visited Okinawa Prefecture many times and exchanged opinions with local musicians and university professors of traditional arts. In an interview with Time Asia, Amuro stated that she had been asked to sing at the summit by Obuchi at a party during November or December of the previous year, which had occurred after Komuro had already spoken to Obuchi. As for the song itself, Amuro stated in the same interview that she felt the song had many meanings and that people would have their own interpretations of it.

"Never End"
A sample of "Never End", which is a pop number that draws inspiration from traditional Okinawan music.

"Never End" was written, composed and arranged fully by Tetsuya Komuro. The composition and melody of "Never End" takes inspiration from traditional Okinawan music. Okinawan musicians such as China Sadao, Nēnēs, Keiko Higa, and others participated in the recording. Thirty elementary and junior high school girls (at the time) living in Okinawa Prefecture participated in the backing chorus.

== Release and promotion ==
Still from the music video showing Amuro singing by a lake

At noon on June 21, 2000, a total of 103 cable radio stations nationwide aired the song "Never End" at the exact same time. On July 11 of the same year, it reached number one on the cable broadcast network (currently USEN) chart, which was unusual for a single before it was widely released. Avex Trax released "Never End" as a maxi-single on July 12, 2000. The single's artwork was photographed by Shoji Uchida, with Tycoon Graphics in Tokyo, Japan, in charge of its art direction. A portion of the proceeds from the sales of the single were donated to the Japanese chapter of UNICEF.

The music video for "Never End" was directed by long-time music video director Masashi Mutō. The music video was filmed at Lake Nukabira and Tawa Breeding Farm in Shibecha, Hokkaido. It depicts Amuro walking around the grasslands, walking near the lake and riding a canoe in the water. She sings the last chorus part in sign language in the music video. The video later appeared on her video albums Filmography (2001) and Best Clips (2002).

== Reception ==
"Never End" received positive reception from music critics. CDJournal called the song a great ballad with an oriental atmosphere that evokes Okinawa from the intro. They also noted that the children's chorus conveys a refreshing message of living strong into the future. Its appearance on Break the Rules was praised for its key changes and build up during the end, with the magazine calling it a masterpiece. Hot Express reacted to the song warmly, stating: "She does not let such pressure get to her head, and she carries the melody, which evokes the oriental Okinawan wind and sea, and her singing voice with a pleasant feeling."

== Live performances ==
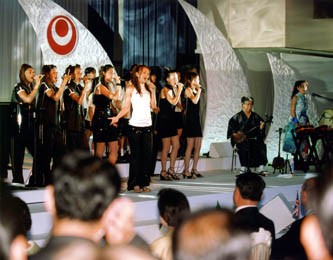
Amuro and others singing "Never End" at the 26th G8 summit welcome party on July 22, 2000

At the welcome party for the 26th G8 summit, Amuro, China, Higa, and the Urasoe Boys and Girls Choirs performed "Never End" in front of the leaders of each country including Bill Clinton, who was the President of the United States at the time.

On December 29, 2000, Amuro appeared on Music Station Super Live and sang "Never End" along with "Think of Me," headlining the show for the second time in three years since 1997. Amuro performed "Never End" at the 51st NHK Kohaku Uta Gassen on December 31, 2000, as a part of the Red team; this marked her sixth consecutive appearance at the prestigious event. During her 2004 Asia tour, the So Crazy Tour, she sang "Never End" as the final encore, singing the second phrase in Mandarin in Taiwan and in Korean in Korea.

== Commercial performance ==
In Japan, "Never End" was commercially successful. Debuting at second place on the Oricon Singles Chart, the single shifted 268,920 copies in its first week, being blocked from reaching number one by the single "Juice" from B'z. On its second week, "Never End" slid to number four on the weekly ranking with 116,970 copies sold. All in all, "Never End" charted in the top 100 for fourteen weeks, selling a reported total of 640,310 copies, and ranked at number 32 on the year-end Oricon Singles Chart for 2000.

"Never End" was the final single from Amuro to premiere with 100,000 copies until 2008 when her single "60s 70s 80s" shipped 114,719 copies in its first week of availability. "Never End" eventually ended up being certified double platinum by the RIAJ in July 2000 for selling over 500,000 copies in the country. It is her best selling single within the 2000s decade and, according to Oricon Style, Amuro's 10th best selling single overall.

== Accolades ==
At the 33rd Japan Cable Awards on December 15, 2000, the song helped Amuro take home the Millennium Award. On December 30, 2000, Amuro won the Special Prize at the 42nd Japan Record Awards. In the ranking of copyright royalty distribution amounts (domestic works) by the Japanese Society for Rights of Authors, Composers and Publishers (JASRAC), "Never End" ranked 6th for the year 2018.

== Track listing ==
CD single / digital download

1. "Never End" (Radio Edit) – 6:26
2. "Never End" (Original Mix) – 6:26
3. "Never End" (Chanpuru Mix) – 6:08
4. "Never End" (Acapella) – 6:04

== Credits and personnel ==
=== Musicians ===
- Namie Amuro – vocals
- Wurasoe Shonenshoko Gashodan – background vocals
- Andy Caine – background vocals
- Jennifer Carr – background vocals
- Juliet Roberts – background vocals
- Tetsuya Komuro – piano
- Sadao China – sanshin
- Keiko Higa – taiko
- Nenes – hayashi

=== Production ===
- Producer – Tetsuya Komuro
- Arranger – Tetsuya Komuro
- Mixing – Dave Ford, Tetsuya Komuro
- Mastering – Ian Cooper
- Programing – Akihisa Murakami, Toshihide Iwasa
- Engineering – Eishin Kitajima, Dave Ford, Toshihiro Wako
- Direction – Tetsuya Komuro, Kenji Sano, Kotaro Takada
- Art Direction & Design – Tycoon Graphics
- Photography – Shoji Uchida
- Styling – Kyoko Tsunoda
- Hair & Make-Up – Akemi Nakano

== Charts ==
=== Weekly charts ===
Chart (2000)	Peak position
Japan Singles (Oricon)	2

Chart (2018)	Peak position
Japan (Japan Hot 100)	49

=== Year-end charts ===
Chart (2000)	Position
Japan Singles (Oricon)	32
Taiwan (Yearly Singles Top 100)	10

2001 year-end charts for Never End
Chart (2001)	Position
Taiwan (Yearly Singles Top 100)	66

== Certifications ==
Region	Certification	Certified units/sales
Japan (RIAJ)	2× Platinum	640,310
