= Camp Schwab =

US Marine Corps camp in Okinawa Prefecture, Japan

Coordinates: 26°31′29″N 128°02′40″E

- Okinawa, Japan
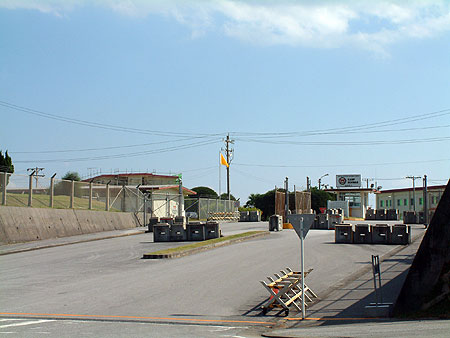
- Gate 1 of Camp Schwab

Site information
- Type: Military base
- Controlled by: USMC

Site history
- In use: 1959- present

Garrison information
- Garrison: 3rd Reconnaissance Battalion 4th Marine Regiment Combat Logistics Battalion 4

Camp Schwab is a United States Marine Corps camp located in northeastern Okinawa Prefecture, Japan, that is currently home to the 4th Marine Regiment and other elements of the 28,000 American servicemen based on the island. The Camp was dedicated in 1959 in honor of Medal of Honor recipient Albert E. Schwab who was killed in action during the Battle of Okinawa.

Camp Schwab is primarily located in the city of Nago (99%); a small part of the base is located in the village of Ginoza (1%).

The unit conducts live-fire training and coordination with other units.

== Base overview ==
- Location: Nago (Toyohara, Henoko, Kushi, Kyoda, Sukuta, Yofuke), Ginoza Village (Matsuda)
- Area: 20.626 km^{2}
- Area ratio by municipality: Nago City 99% (about 20.43 km^{2} ), Ginoza Village 1% (about 0.2 km^{2} )
- Management Unit: U.S. Marine Corps Base Command in Okinawa
- Number of landowners: 752
- Annual rent: 2,639 million yen (FY2012 results)
- Number of stationed Marine employees: 242

Adjacent to the north side of Camp Schwab is the Henoko Ordnance Storage.

U.S. military base in Henoko, Nago City
FAC6009	Camp schwab	Camp schwab	
FAC6009	Camp schwab	Camp Schwab Training Ground	
FAC6009	Camp schwab	Camp Schwab LST mooring facility	See Table C
FAC6010	Henoko Ordnance Storage	Henoko Ordnance Storage	
FAC6010	Henoko Ordnance Storage	Henoko Navy Ammunition Dump	

=== Units and mission ===
III Marine Expeditionary Force, 3rd Marine Division (4th Marine Regiment, Combat Assault Battalion (deactivated on October 12, 2018) and 3rd Reconnaissance Battalion), etc. (Army, Navy, Air Force use range etc.)

Purpose of use: Dormitory, various entertainment facilities, management office and training ground

== Geography ==
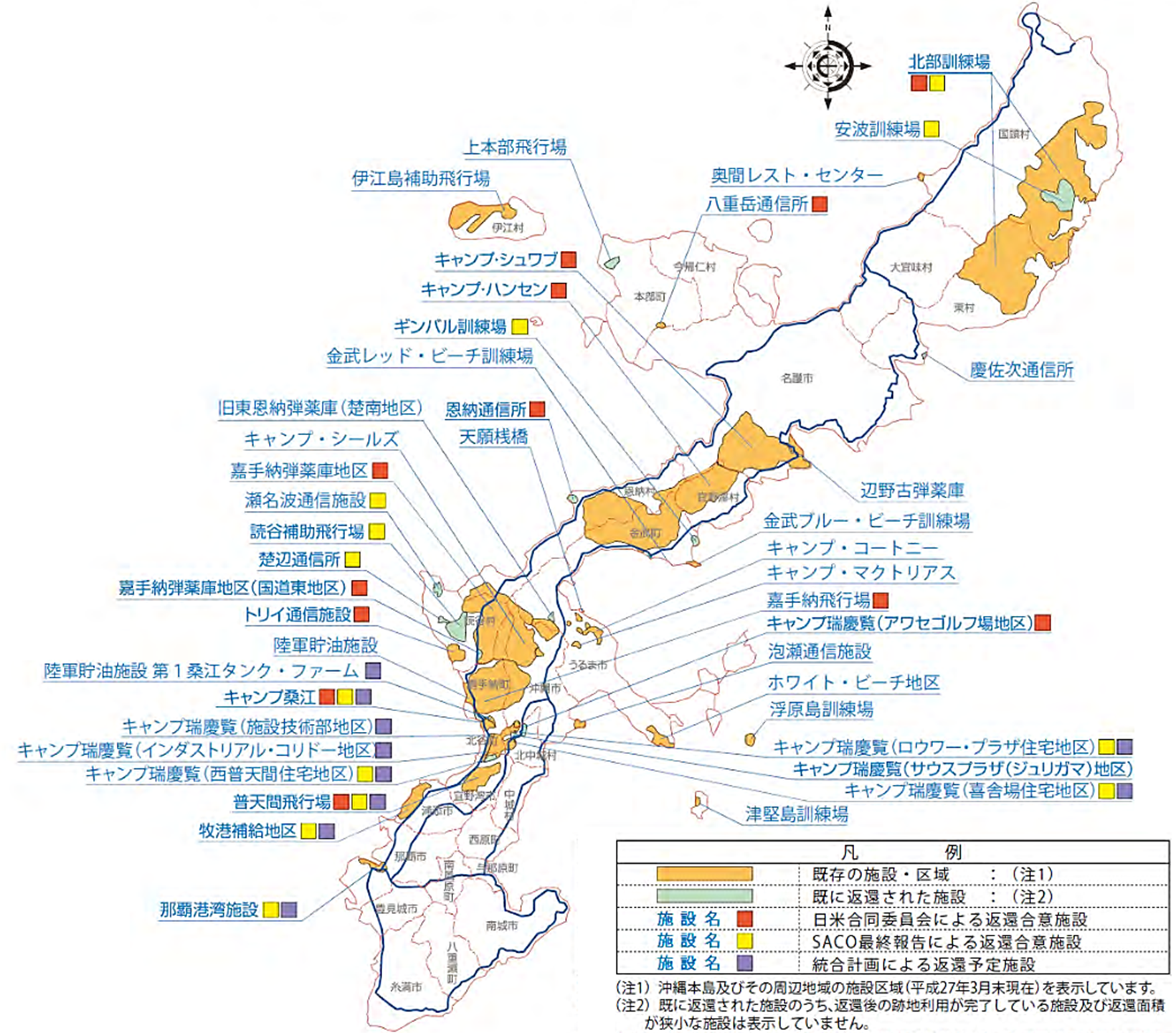
Both Camp Hansen and Camp Schwab form a vast central training ground. It is also adjacent to the Henoko Ordnance Storage on the west side.

It is divided into a Schwab training area located in the inland area on the west side of Route 329 (* at the same time, National Route 331 also overlaps) and a camp area on the east coast.

The Henoko Ordnance Storage is adjacent to the north side. The Schwab training area forms the north side of a large training ground called the Central Training Area. The south side is adjacent to the Camp Hansen training area.

There is also a Marine training ground and training area on the coast for amphibious assault exercises on LSTs (tank landing ships) and amphibious vehicles. The foot of Mt. Kushidake is used as a landing area for live ammunition training and as an abandoned ammunition disposal site.

== Relocation of Marine Corps Air Station Futenma ==
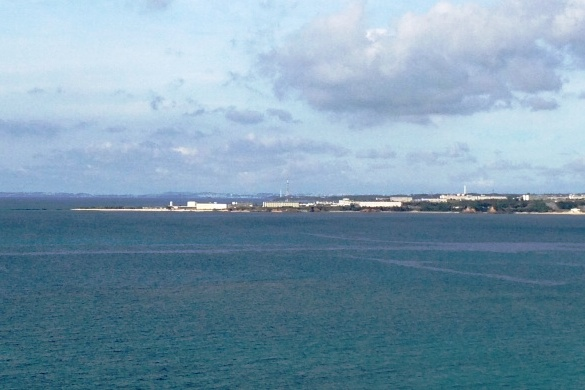
Ourawan bay and Camp Schwab

There have been various plans to relocate Marine Corps Air Station Futenma—first off the island and most recently to Camp Schwab—however, as of November 2014 the future of any relocation is uncertain with the election of base-opponent Onaga as Okinawa governor. Onaga won against the incumbent Nakaima who had earlier approved landfill work to move the base to Camp Schwab in Henoko. Onaga has promised to veto the landfill work needed for the new base to be built and insisted Futenma should be moved outside of Okinawa.

== Incidents ==
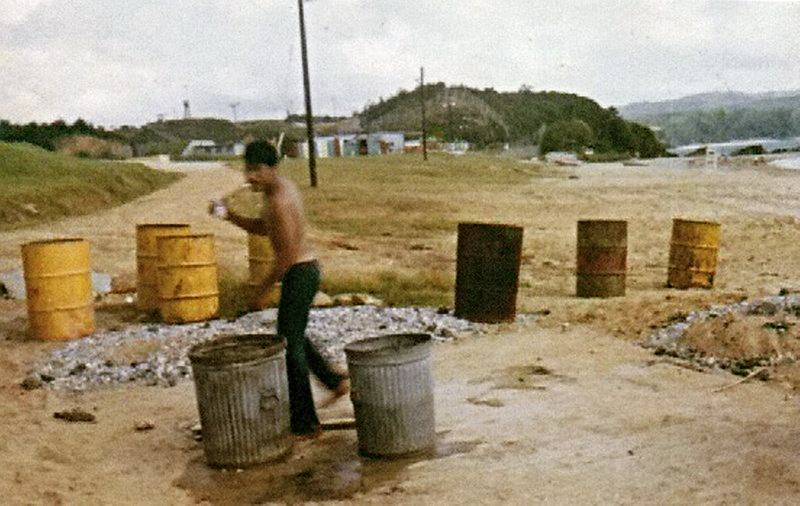
1971: Marine Scott Parton at Camp Schwab on Okinawa near Agent Orange Barrel (second from right)

Reports indicate that Agent Orange was stored and used at Camp Schwab and other US bases on Okinawa in the 1960s. The US government denies that the toxin was present at the base, and the Japanese government has declined to investigate.

On 24 March 2009, a Marine was killed and two others injured in an explosion near the base. The Marine Corps announced that the Marines were part of an explosive ordnance disposal team preparing unexploded ordnance for disposal when the explosion occurred.
