= Albert E. Schwab =

United States Marine Corps Medal of Honor recipient

Albert Earnest Schwab
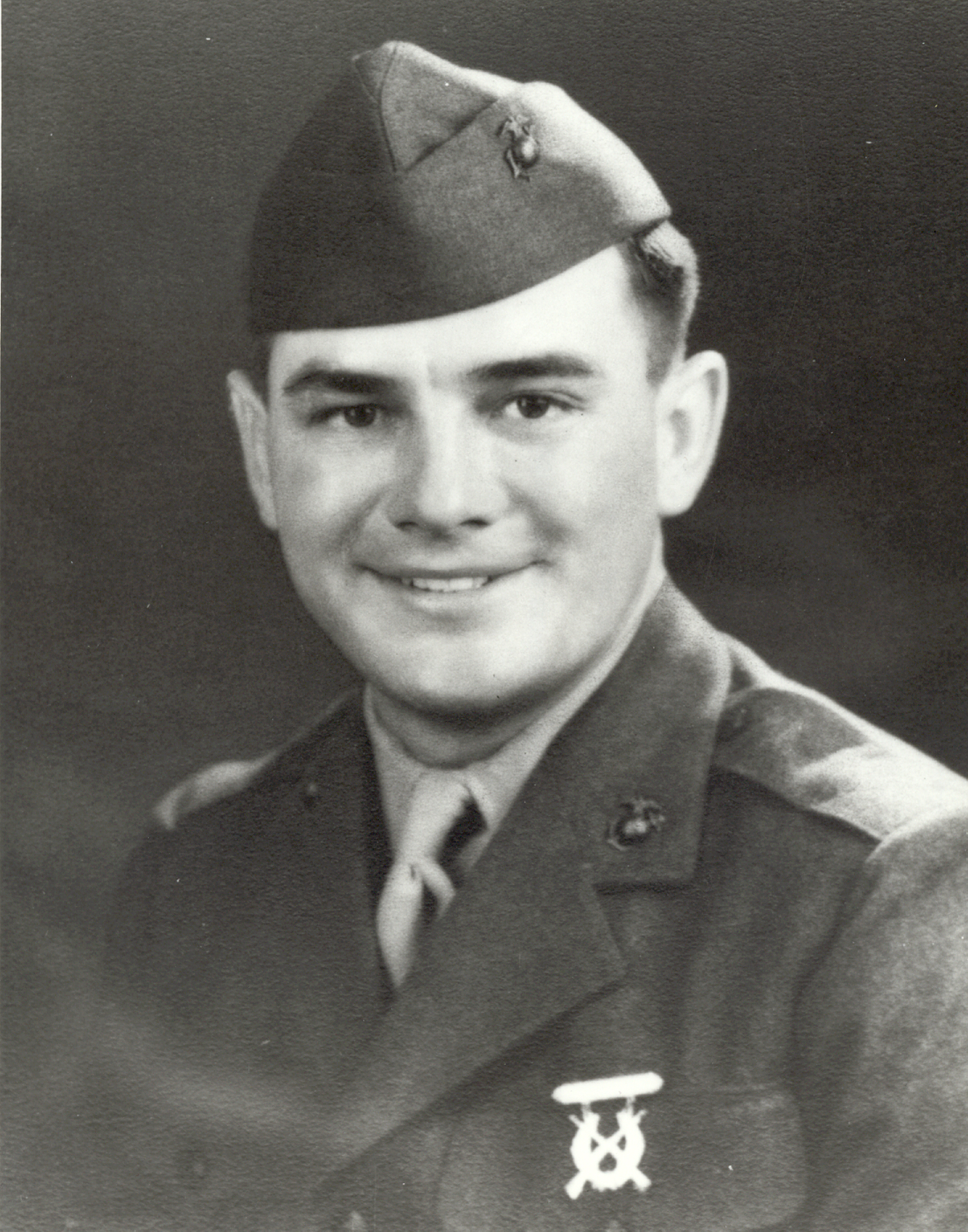
- Albert E. Schwab, posthumous Medal of Honor recipient
- Born: July 17, 1920; Washington, D.C.
- Died: May 7, 1945 (aged 24); Okinawa, Ryukyu Islands, Japanese Empire
- Burial place: Memorial Park Cemetery, Tulsa, Oklahoma
- Military career
- Allegiance: United States of America
- Branch: United States Marine Corps
- Service years: 1944–1945
- Rank: Private First Class
- Units: 1st Battalion, 5th Marines, 1st Marine Division
- Conflicts: World War II: Battle of Okinawa †
- Awards: Medal of Honor; Purple Heart

Private First Class Albert Earnest Schwab (July 17, 1920 – May 7, 1945) was a United States Marine who was posthumously awarded the United States' highest military honor — the Medal of Honor — for his heroic actions during the Battle of Okinawa. Just five days short of completing one year of United States Marine Corps service, on May 7, 1945, PFC Schwab singlehandedly destroyed two important Japanese machine gun positions during a critical stage of battle, allowing his pinned down unit to advance.

== Biography ==
Albert Earnest Schwab was born on July 17, 1920, in Washington, D.C. Early in his life, his family moved to Tulsa, Oklahoma, where he attended local schools, graduating from Tulsa High School in 1937. After one semester at the University of Tulsa, Schwab went to work for an oil company. Named after his grandfather Ernest Robitaille, Schwab is a descendant of Wyandotte war chief Tarhe, a signatory to the Treaty of Greenville.

Inducted into the Marine Corps on May 12, 1944, he was sent for recruit training at the San Diego, California. After graduation he went home on ten days of leave; the only time his family was to see him in the Marine uniform. After this, Schwab was sent to the 2nd Training Battalion at Camp Pendleton, California. In November he was transferred to the 13th Replacement Draft and on November 12, 1944, departed for overseas duty aboard the USS Wharton (AP-7). He joined the 1st Marine Division at Pavuvu Island, in the Russells, and was assigned to Headquarters Company, 1st Battalion, 5th Marines. On December 24, 1944, Pvt Schwab was promoted to private first class and in February 1945, he, along with the rest of the division, embarked for maneuvers which eventually led to the shores of Okinawa, Japan on Easter Sunday, April 1, 1945.

Private First Class Schwab was a flame thrower operator with Headquarters Company. When that company was pinned down in a valley on May 7, by the withering fire of a machine gun coming from a ridge high to the company's front, Schwab scaled the cliff in the face of heavy fire and attacked the gun with his flamethrower. Quickly demolishing the position and its crew, his company was able to occupy the ridge. Almost immediately, a second machine gun opened fire inflicting more casualties on the unit. Although he had not had time to replenish his supply of fuel, PFC Schwab unhesitatingly advanced on the second gun and succeeded in eliminating it before a final burst caught him in the left hip, inflicting fatal wounds.

Private First Class Schwab's body was returned to the United States and buried with full military honors at Memorial Park, Tulsa on February 27, 1949.

The Medal of Honor was presented to PFC Schwab's three-year-old son at Boulder Park in Tulsa on Memorial Day 1946 by Rear Admiral J.J. Clark, USN, Commander of the Naval Air Basic Training Command, Naval Air Station, Corpus Christi, Texas.

== Medal of Honor citation ==
The President of the United States takes pride in presenting the MEDAL OF HONOR posthumously to

PRIVATE FIRST CLASS ALBERT E. SCHWAB
UNITED STATES MARINE CORPS RESERVE

for service as set forth in the following CITATION:

For conspicuous gallantry and intrepidity at the risk of his life above and beyond the call of duty as a Flame Thrower Operator serving with Headquarters Company, First Battalion, Fifth Marines, First Marine Division, in action against enemy Japanese forces on Okinawa Shima on one of the Ryukyu Islands, May 7, 1945. Quick to take action when his company was pinned down in a valley and suffering resultant heavy casualties under blanketing machine-gun fire emanating from a high ridge to the front, Private First Class Schwab, unable to flank the enemy emplacement because of steep cliffs on either side, advanced up the face of the ridge in bold defiance of the intense barrage and, skillfully directing the fire of his flame thrower, quickly demolished the hostile gun position, thereby enabling his company to occupy the ridge. Suddenly a second Japanese machine gun opened fire, killing or wounding several Marines with its initial burst. Estimating with split-second decision the tactical difficulties confronting his comrades, Private First Class Schwab elected to continue his one-man assault despite a diminished supply of fuel for his flame thrower. Cool and indomitable, he moved forward in the face of the direct concentration of hostile fire, relentlessly closed the enemy position and attacked. Although severely wounded by a final vicious blast from the enemy weapon, Private First Class Schwab had succeeded in destroying two highly strategic Japanese gun positions during a critical stage of the operation and, by his dauntless, singlehanded efforts, materially furthered the advance of his company. His aggressive initiative, outstanding valor and professional skill throughout the bitter conflict sustained and enhanced the highest traditions of the United States Naval Service. He gallantly gave his life for his country.

/S/ HARRY S. TRUMAN

== Honors ==
- On October 3, 1959, a Marine camp constructed on Okinawa was named Camp Schwab in honor of the heroic Marine.
- In 2001, American Legion Post 555 in Midway City, California, renamed itself the Albert E. Schwab American Legion Post after Schwab, the brother of a Legion Post 555 member.
- The Marine Corps League detachment 857 in Schwab's hometown of Tulsa, Oklahoma, is the "Albert E. Schwab" detachment.
- An exhibit in Schwab's honor was erected at Tulsa International Airport. A statue was later added to it, which was completed in 2011.

== See also ==
- List of Medal of Honor recipients for World War II
