= National Institute of Technology, Okinawa College =

Japanese college of technology

- 沖縄工業高等専門学校
- Other names: NIT, Okinawa College / NIT-Ok
- Type: College of technology
- Established: 2009
- Principal: Yasunori ANDO (Apr 2015~)
- Location: 905 Henoko, Nago, Okinawa 905-2192 Japan; 26.5265°N 128.0303°E
- Website: en.okinawa-ct.ac.jp

The National Institute of Technology, Okinawa College (沖縄工業高等専門学校, Okinawa Kōgyōkōtōsenmongakkō) is a college of technology in Nago, Japan. Its abbreviated name is NIT-Ok (Japanese: 沖縄高専; Okinawa Kōsen).

== History ==
The Institute's opening ceremony came on 2009 April 10. On 2009 April 21 a University - Industry Cooperation Committee was established. The Advanced Course was founded in 2009.

In 2011 April a technical support center established, followed in 2012 April by a Regional Joint Techno Center.

In 2014 March 21 the first graduation ceremony was held.

In 2019 April, the Development Program of Aeronautical Engineering was founded.

== Curricula ==
The school splits into Main and Advanced courses.

=== Main Course ===
- Department of Mechanical Systems Engineering (機械システム工学科, kikai system kōgakuka))(MS)
- Department of Information And Communication Systems Engineering (情報通信システム工学科, jōhō tsūshin system kōgakuka)(IC)
- Department of Media Information Engineering (メディア情報工学科, media jōhō kōgakuka)(MI)
- Department of Bioresources Engineering (生物資源工学科, sēbutsu shigen kōgakuka)(BR)

About 40 students are enrolled in each department every year.
Students take general curriculum courses along with specialized courses relevant to the department.
Graduates receive the title of "associate degree" after completion.

=== Advanced Course ===
- Course of Mechanical Systems Engineering (機械システム工学コース, kikai system kōgaku -course)
- Course of Electronic Communication Systems Engineering (電子通信システム工学コース, denshi tsūshin system kōgaku course)
- Course of Information Engineering (情報工学コース, jōhō kōgaku course)
- Course of Bioresources Engineering (生物資源工学コース, sēbutsu shigen kōgaku course)

Each course corresponds to the departments of the Main Course.

== Features ==
Students are required to have a laptop.

Wi-Fi is available across the college.

Most student assignments and evaluations are online.

== Facilities ==
=== Invention and Production Building (創造・実践棟, sōzō jissenntō) ===
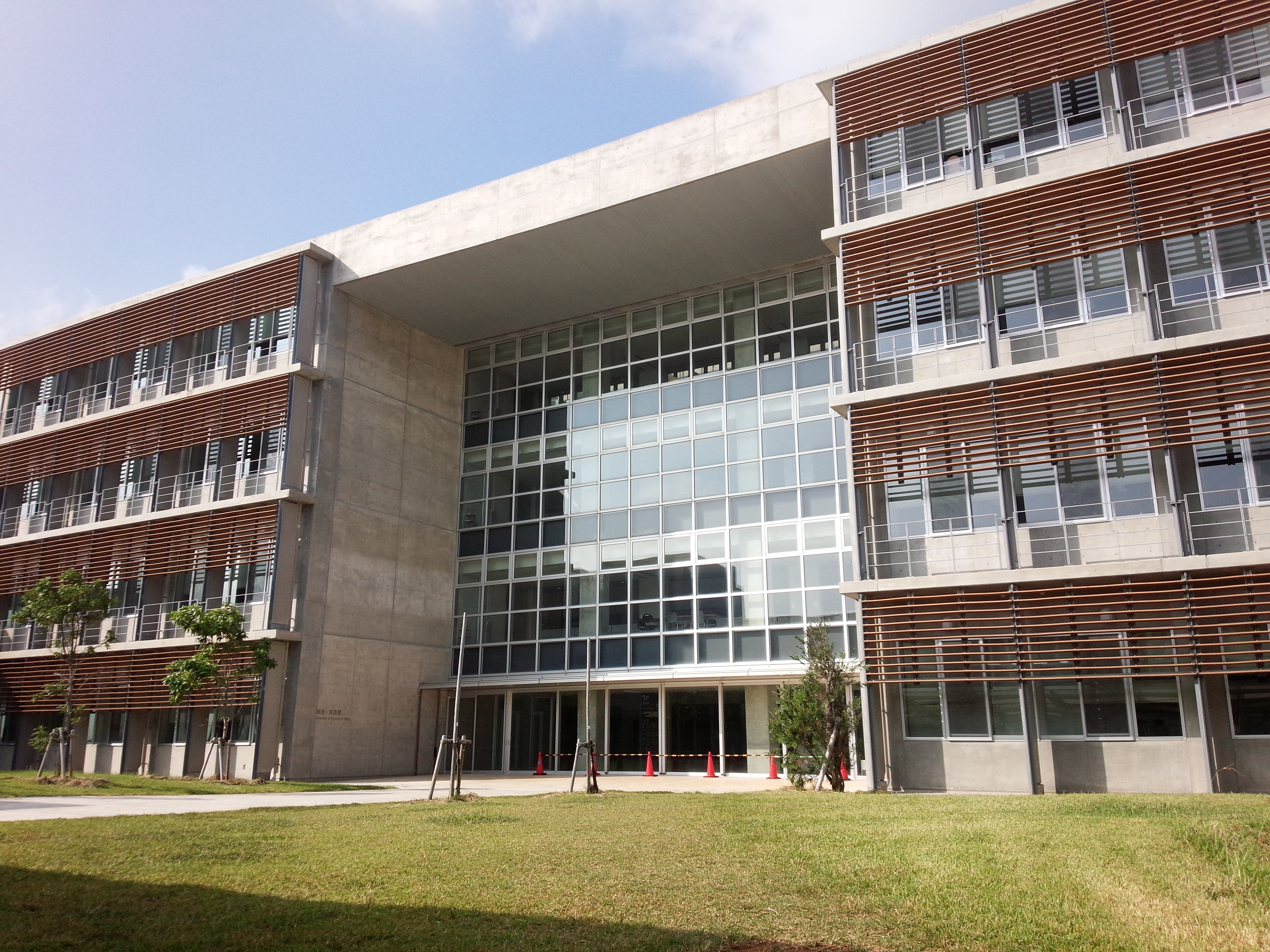
Invention and Production Building

- Lecture rooms, experiment rooms and faculty research rooms
- Most lectures are carried out there.

=== Media Building (メディア棟, media tō) ===
- Admin office, library, health room, meeting rooms, student counseling room, cafeteria, student council room, and alumni association room.
- Audio-visual-hall. Used for lectures and gatherings.

=== Library ===
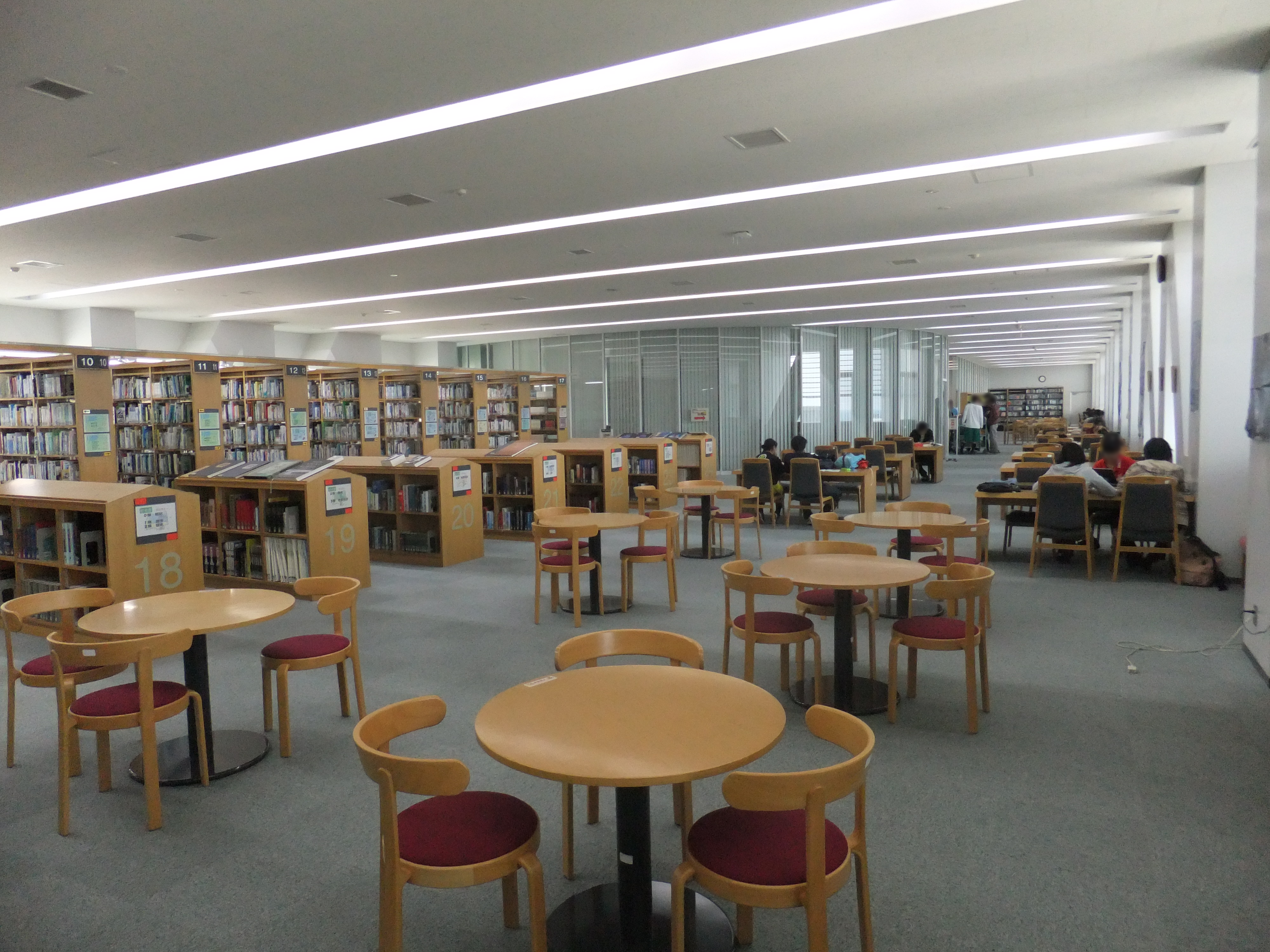
Library

- The library has around 69,000 books.
- The library has books mainly on engineering, natural sciences and skill development.

=== Cafeteria ===
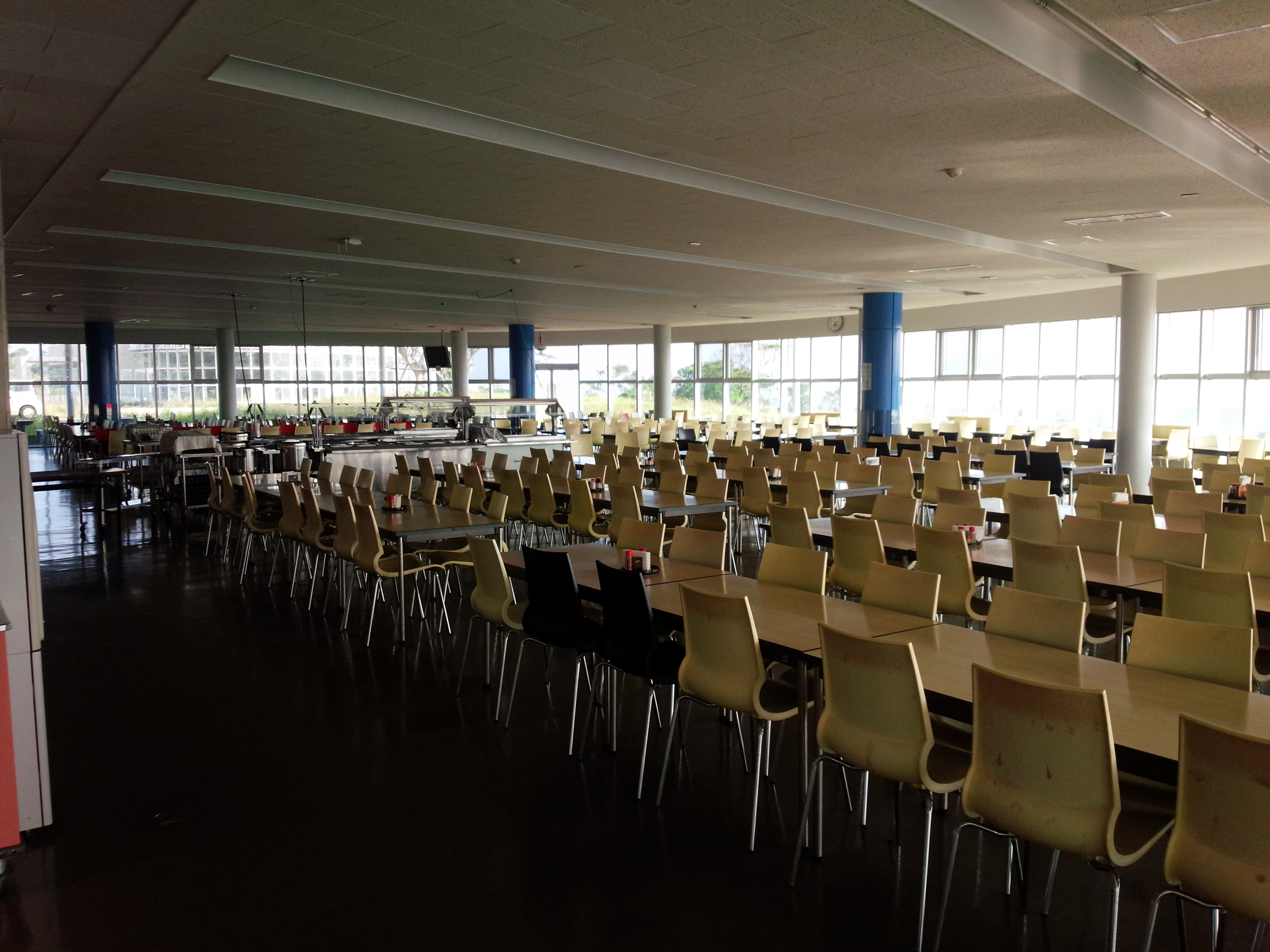
Cafeteria

- The common area is accessible to students and faculty.

=== Education and Research Center for Subtropical Resources (教育・実験棟, kyōiku jikkentō) ===
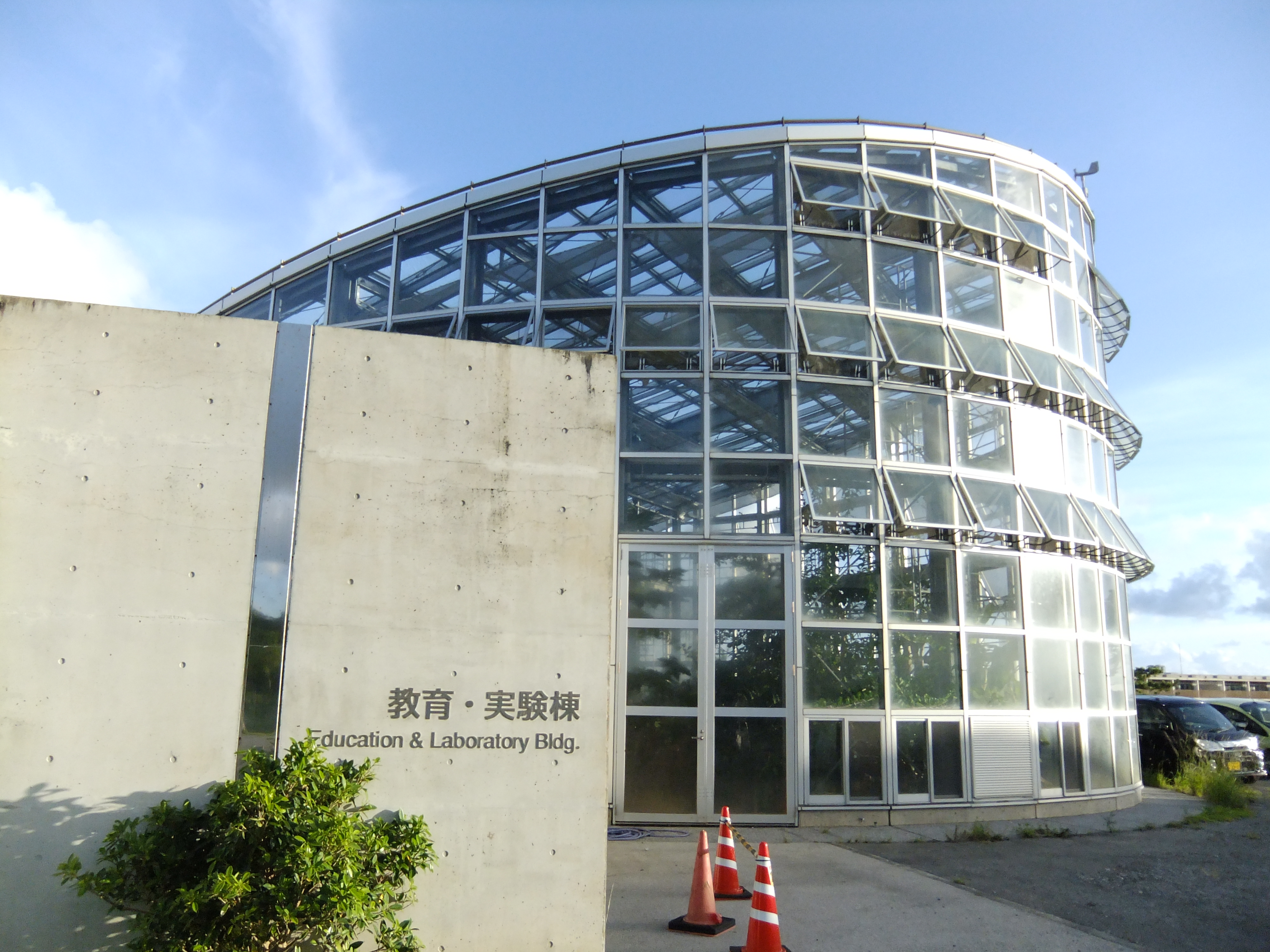
Education and Research Center

- The building is for the Department of Biological Resources.
