= Please Smile Again =

2000 single by Namie Amuro

Single by Namie Amuro

from the album Break the Rules
- B-side: Cross Over; (TK original mix)
- Released: October 4, 2000
- Recorded: Larrabee Sound Studios; TK Disc
- Length: 25:26
- Label: Avex Trax
- Songwriter(s): Tetsuya Komuro
- Producer(s): Tetsuya Komuro

Namie Amuro singles chronology
"Never End" (2000)	"Please Smile Again" (2000)	"Think of Me / No More Tears" (2001)

"Please Smile Again" is Namie Amuro's 17th solo single on the Avex Trax label. Although the single "Think of Me / No More Tears" (2001) was slated to be released in December, it was pushed back until the next year making "Please Smile Again" the last single to precede her 4th studio album, Break the Rules (2000). It was certified gold for 200,000 copies shipped to stores.

== Commercial tie-in ==
"Please Smile Again" was used in commercials for Meiji Fran products. "Cross Over" was used in cell phone MM TU-KA commercials. Amuro appeared in both ad campaigns.

== Track listing ==
1. "Please Smile Again (TK original mix)" (Tetsuya Komuro) – 4:46
2. "Cross Over (TK original mix)" (Tetsuya Komuro) – 4:43
3. "Please Smile Again (Jamaster A Mix)" (Remixed by Alex Baboo & Groovy Cat) – 6:37
4. "Please Smile Again (TV mix)" (Tetsuya Komuro) – 4:45
5. "Please Smile Again (a cappella)" (Tetsuya Komuro) – 4:35

== Personnel ==
- Namie Amuro – vocals, background vocals
- Tetsuya Komuro – synthesizer, keyboard
- Ken Kimura – guitar

== Production ==
- Producer – Tetsuya Komuro
- Arranger – Tetsuya Komuro
- Mixing – Tetsuya Komuro
- Remixing & additional production – Alex Baboo & Groovy Cat
- Synthesizer programming – Akihisa Murakami, Toshihide Iwasa

== Charts ==
Oricon Sales Chart (Japan)

Release	Chart	Peak position	First week sales	Sales total
October 4, 2000	Oricon Weekly Singles Chart	2	94,520	216,960
