= Nago =

City in Okinawa Prefecture, Japan

Nago 名護市 Nagu
- City
- Nago City
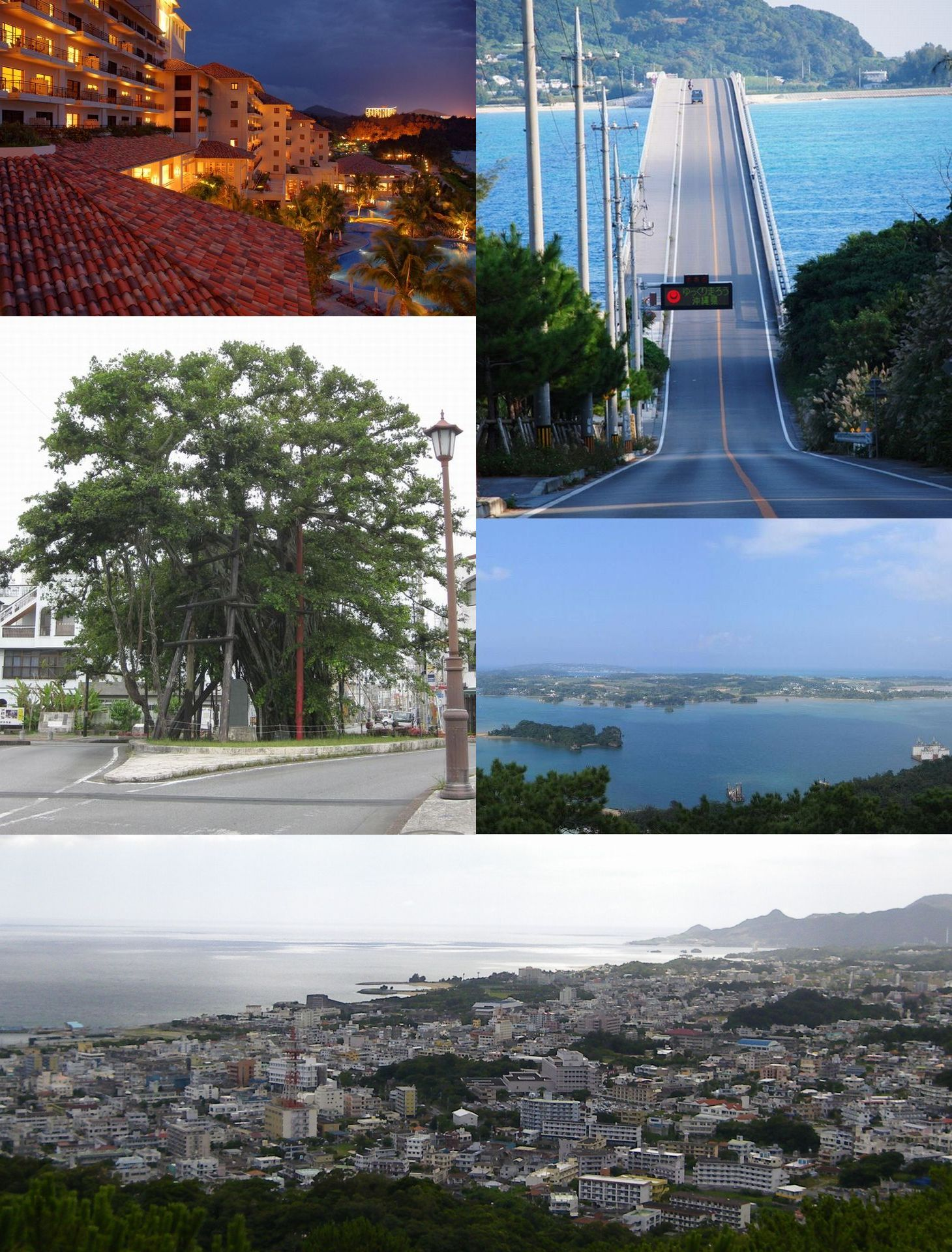
- Top left:A resort place in Busena marine park, Top right:Koriya Bridge, between Yagagi and Koriya Island, Middle left:A Hinpun Gajumara tree in Higashie area, Middle right:View of Yagagi Island, from Arashiyama observation deck, Bottom:Panorama View of downtown Nago, from Nago Central Park

- Flag Seal

- Location of Nago in Okinawa Prefecture

- Location within Japan
- Coordinates: 26°35′30″N 127°58′39″E
- Country: Japan
- Region: Kyushu (Ryukyu)
- Prefecture: Okinawa Prefecture

Government
  - Mayor: Toguchi Taketoyo

Area
  - Total: 210.37 km^{2} (81.22 sq mi)

Population (December, 2012)
  - Total: 61,659
  - Density: 293.1/km^{2} (759/sq mi)
- Time zone: UTC+9 (Japan Standard Time)
- City symbols
  - Tree: Banyan
  - Flower: Easter lily
  - Bird: Ryukyu white-eye (Zosterops japonicus loochooensis)
  - Butterfly: Orange oakleaf
  - Fish: Japanese whiting
  - Flowering tree: Kanhizakura (Prunus campanulata)
  - Shell: Chiragra spider conch (Lambis chiragra)
- Phone number: 0980-53-1212
- Address: 1-1-1 Minato, Nago-shi 905-8540
- Website: www.city.nago.okinawa.jp/index.html

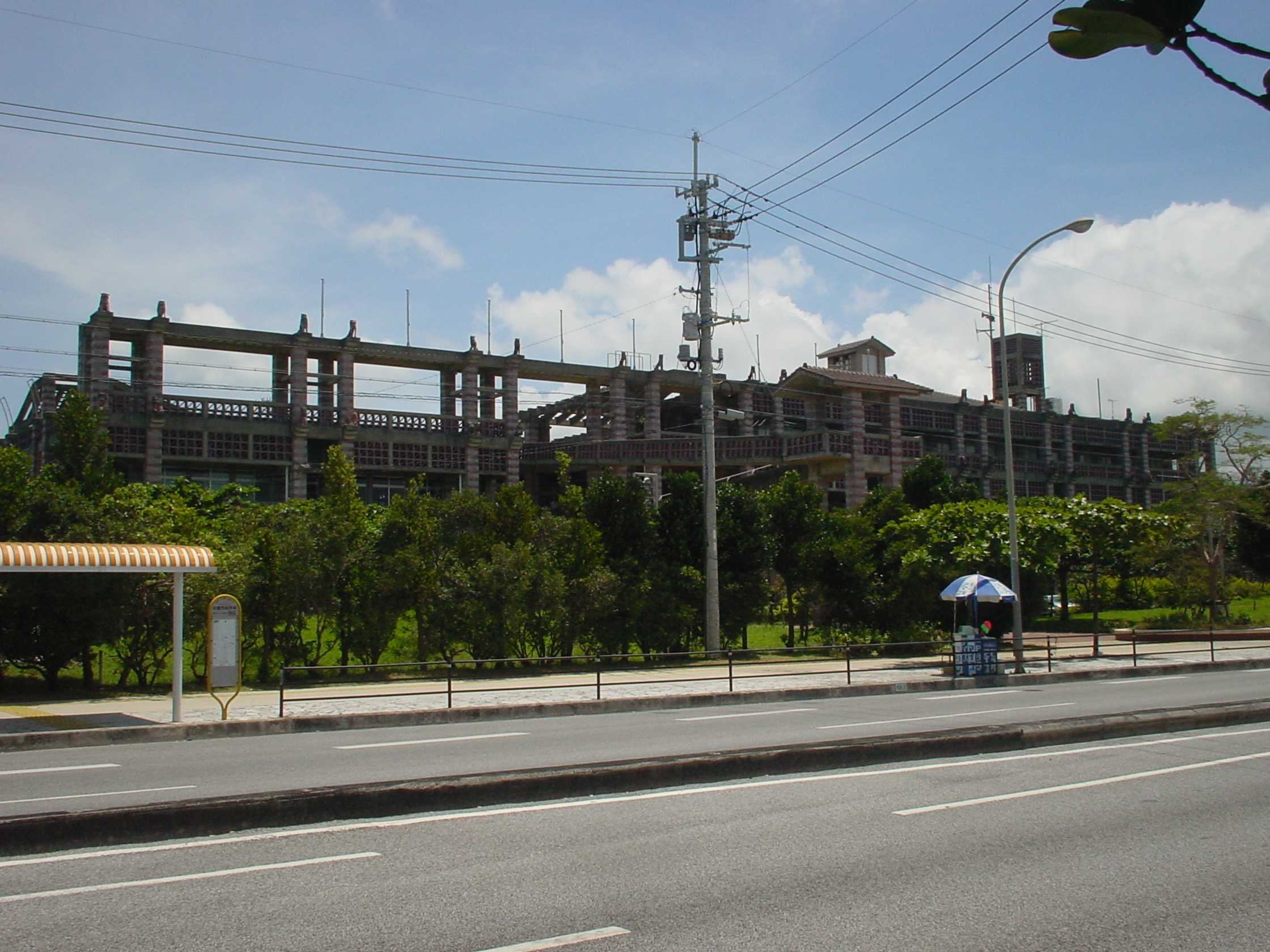
Nago City Hall in the Minato area

Nago (名護市, Nago-shi; Okinawan: ナグ Nagu, Kunigami: ナグー Naguu) is a city located in the northern part of Okinawa Island, Okinawa Prefecture, Japan. As of December 2012, the city has an estimated population of 61,659 and a population density of 293 persons per km^{2}. Its total area is 210.30 km^{2}.

== Geography ==
Nago City is located in the northern part of Okinawa Island and with an area of 210.33 km^{2}, it represents 9.2% of Okinawa Island's surface, coming third behind Taketomi (334.02 km^{2}) and Ishigaki (229.00 km^{2}) in Okinawa Prefecture, but first on Okinawa Island. The city is bordered by the sea both on the west and the east. About 10% of the city area is occupied by U.S. military bases.

=== Administrative divisions ===
The city includes fifty-six wards.

- Abu (安部)
- Asahikawa (旭川)
- Awa (安和)
- Bīmata (為又)
- Burikena (振慶名)
- Futami (二見)
- Gabu (我部)
- Gabusoka (我部祖河)
- Genka (源河)
- Goga (呉我)
- Henoko (辺野古)
- Inamine (稲嶺)
- Isagawa (伊差川)
- Katsuyama (勝山)
- Kawakami (川上)
- Kayō (嘉陽)
- Kise (喜瀬)
- Kogachi (古我知)
- Kōki (幸喜)
- Kushi (久志)
- Kyoda (許田)
- Makiya (真喜屋)
- Mihara (三原)
- Miyazato (宮里)
- Nago (名護)
  - Agarie (東江)
  - Gusuku (城)
  - Minato (港)
  - Ōhigashi (大東)
  - Ōkita (大北)
  - Ōminami (大南)
  - Ōnaka (大中)
  - Ōnishi (大西)
- Nakao (仲尾)
- Nakaoshi (仲尾次)
- Nakayama (中山)
- Ōkawa (大川)
- Ōura (大浦)
- Oyakawa (親川)
- Sedake (瀬嵩)
- Sukuta (数久田)
- Sumuide (済井出)
- Taira (田井等)
- Teima (汀間)
- Teniya (天仁屋)
  - Sokoniya (底仁屋)
- Toyohara (豊原)
- Uchihara (内原)
- Umusa (宇茂佐)
- Umusanomori (宇茂佐の森)
- Untenbaru (運天原)
- Yabu (屋部)
- Yaga (屋我)
- Yamada (山田)
- Yamanoha (山入端)
- Yofuke (世冨慶)
- Yohena (饒平名)

=== Main summits ===
- Mount Yae (453 m)
- Mount Katsuu (452 m)
- Mount Awa (432 m)
- Mount Tano (383 m)
- Mount Nago (345 m)
- Mount Kushi (335 m)
- Mount Hitotsudake (295 m)
- Mount Ubashi (284 m)
- Mount Ishidake (236 m)

=== Neighbouring municipalities ===
- Ginoza
- Higashi
- Motobu
- Nakijin
- Ōgimi
- Onna

=== U.S. military bases in Nago ===
About 10% of the area of Nago is occupied by U.S. military bases.

U.S. military base	Area	Area in Nago
Camp Schwab	2062.6ha	2042.7ha
Henoko ammunition depot	121.4ha	121.4ha
Camp Hansen	4870.8ha	5.9ha
Yaedake Communication Site	3.7ha	2.5ha

==== U.S. military bases that have been returned to the city ====
Kushi Training Area 8.5ha

==== U.S. military bases under construction ====
New Henoko Base 205 ha (land reclaimed on sea: 160ha)

== Climate ==
Nago has a humid subtropical climate (Köppen climate classification Cfa) with very warm summers and mild winters. Precipitation is abundant throughout the year; the wettest month is August and the driest month is December.

Climate data for Nago (1991−2020 normals, extremes 1966−present)
Month	Jan	Feb	Mar	Apr	May	Jun	Jul	Aug	Sep	Oct	Nov	Dec	Year
Record high °C (°F)	26.0 (78.8)	26.2 (79.2)	27.7 (81.9)	29.7 (85.5)	31.8 (89.2)	33.7 (92.7)	35.1 (95.2)	35.1 (95.2)	34.5 (94.1)	33.6 (92.5)	30.2 (86.4)	28.2 (82.8)	35.1 (95.2)
Mean maximum °C (°F)	24.0 (75.2)	24.4 (75.9)	25.8 (78.4)	27.5 (81.5)	29.8 (85.6)	32.3 (90.1)	33.7 (92.7)	33.6 (92.5)	33.0 (91.4)	31.1 (88.0)	28.5 (83.3)	25.8 (78.4)	34.0 (93.2)
Mean daily maximum °C (°F)	19.4 (66.9)	19.8 (67.6)	21.5 (70.7)	24.0 (75.2)	26.7 (80.1)	29.5 (85.1)	31.9 (89.4)	31.9 (89.4)	30.8 (87.4)	28.0 (82.4)	24.8 (76.6)	21.1 (70.0)	25.8 (78.4)
Daily mean °C (°F)	16.5 (61.7)	16.8 (62.2)	18.5 (65.3)	20.9 (69.6)	23.8 (74.8)	26.9 (80.4)	28.9 (84.0)	28.8 (83.8)	27.6 (81.7)	25.0 (77.0)	21.9 (71.4)	18.2 (64.8)	22.8 (73.0)
Mean daily minimum °C (°F)	13.7 (56.7)	13.9 (57.0)	15.6 (60.1)	18.2 (64.8)	21.2 (70.2)	24.9 (76.8)	26.7 (80.1)	26.4 (79.5)	25.1 (77.2)	22.5 (72.5)	19.3 (66.7)	15.6 (60.1)	20.3 (68.5)
Mean minimum °C (°F)	9.0 (48.2)	9.2 (48.6)	10.3 (50.5)	12.6 (54.7)	16.5 (61.7)	20.6 (69.1)	24.4 (75.9)	24.2 (75.6)	22.0 (71.6)	18.7 (65.7)	15.0 (59.0)	11.0 (51.8)	8.2 (46.8)
Record low °C (°F)	3.6 (38.5)	3.4 (38.1)	4.7 (40.5)	6.3 (43.3)	11.7 (53.1)	15.8 (60.4)	20.9 (69.6)	20.3 (68.5)	14.5 (58.1)	11.1 (52.0)	8.7 (47.7)	5.5 (41.9)	3.4 (38.1)
Average precipitation mm (inches)	96.8 (3.81)	109.9 (4.33)	140.8 (5.54)	160.8 (6.33)	220.1 (8.67)	291.7 (11.48)	182.6 (7.19)	265.9 (10.47)	238.4 (9.39)	184.7 (7.27)	119.2 (4.69)	109.7 (4.32)	2,120.7 (83.49)
Average precipitation days (≥ 0.5 mm)	13.6	12.2	13.3	12.2	13.5	13.5	12.2	14.5	14.0	11.4	10.6	12.6	153.8
Average relative humidity (%)	69	71	73	76	79	83	79	79	77	74	71	69	75
Mean monthly sunshine hours	94.7	91.4	112.6	121.3	136.7	152.3	235.7	211.9	183.4	166.2	124.5	108.0	1,738.8
Source: Japan Meteorological Agency

== History ==
Nago Castle was built in the 14th century and served as the home of the Aji of Nago Magiri. Nago had always been one of the major settlements in Northern Okinawa, and a major port along with Unten. Nago Magiri became Nago town in 1907. Nago was upgraded to city status on August 1, 1970 with the merger of nine smaller towns and villages.

Nago hosted Expo '75 in a park which utilized a monorail train to move tourists to each exhibit. Its most popular exhibit was the Japanese Floating City; similar to an oil rig, the city floated on large pontoons which allowed it to be moved. If the city was threatened with a typhoon, it would move close to shore, fill the pontoons with sea water and sit on the ocean floor for more stability. The city was self sufficient, and used the ocean floor for cultivating seaweed and other edible plants. Nago also hosted the 26th G8 summit in 2000.

Nago is the site of Camp Schwab, a United States Marine Corps base established in 1956. It has gained national attention in Japan due to the controversy surrounding the relocation of Marine Corps Air Station Futenma in Ginowan, as there have been proposals at various times to relocate the base to a new site adjacent to or within Camp Schwab, most recently in April 2013. The January 19, 2014 mayoral election in Nago became a de facto referendum on the April 2013 relocation plan, with incumbent mayor Susumu Inamine opposing the plan and his challenger, former Vice Mayor Bunshin Suematsu, supporting the plan.

== Tourism ==
Nago is a tourist town. The many beaches draw Okinawans, mainland Japanese, Americans and other tourists to the northern part of the island. The main beach, known as Nago beach, is located on highway 58 in 21st Century Park. The facilities have showers, washrooms, and vending machines, and sites can be rented for picnics or barbecues. There is a lifeguard on duty and a net in the water to prevent harmful sea creatures from entering the swimming area.

A popular tourist destination is the Pineapple Park which is located on route 84. Right beside the Pineapple Park is Okinawa Fruits land. Pineapple Park is an interactive museum where visitors can see how pineapple is grown, and how pineapple wine is made. There is also a collection of thousands of seashells.

Okinawa Fruits Land is a conservatory with many plants, birds and fruits. A map is provided and tourists can wander through the park as they wish. There are many types of tropical birds.

The corals and seagrass beds of the east coast of Nago are home to the last remaining population of dugong in Japan.

Nago also hosts the international bicycle race known as the Tour de Okinawa, which is usually held in November.

Since 1959, Nago has hosted the Nago 1/2 marathon race in February.

Because of Nago's sub tropical environment, cherry blossoms bloom early in the year. Nago is always one of the first cities to host the cherry blossom festival every year in January.

== Economy ==
Nago established itself as a tax haven for financial companies in 2002, following the example of Dublin, Ireland. The Nago Multimedia Building was established as the core of this zone, with various subsidies for foreign financial firms to establish offices there.

Orion Breweries has its factory in Nago. The city is also noted for the production of cement, rice, sugarcane, and pineapples.

== Education ==
Founded as a private university, the now public Meio University is located in Nago. The National Institute of Technology, Okinawa College is also located in Nago.

Prefectural high schools:

- Okinawa Prefectural Nago Senior High School (沖縄県立名護高等学校)
- Okinawa Prefectural Nago Commercial and Technical High School (沖縄県立名護商工高等学校)
- Okinawa Prefectural Hokubu Agriculture and Forestry High School (沖縄県立北部農林高等学校)

Municipal junior high schools:

- Nago Municipal Agarie Junior High School (名護市立東江中学校)
- Nago Municipal Hanezi (Haneji) Junior High School (名護市立羽地中学校)
- Nago Municipal Kube Junior High School (名護市立久辺中学校)
- Nago Municipal Nago Junior High School (名護市立名護中学校)
- Nago Municipal Oomiya Junior High School (名護市立大宮中学校)
- Nago Municipal Yabu Junior High School (名護市立屋部中学校)
- Nago Municipal Yagazi (Yagaji) Junior High School (名護市立屋我地中学校)

Private schools:

- Enagic Sports High School (エナジックスポーツ高等学院) - A private school
- Okinawa Saniku Junior High School (沖縄三育中学校) of Saniku Gakuin

== Cultural Properties ==
Nago City hosts sixty-three designated or registered cultural properties and monuments, at the national, prefectural or municipal level.

- Name (Japanese) (Type of registration)

=== Cultural Properties ===
- Awa Stone Bridge (安和の石橋) (Municipal)
- Calligraphy by Tei Junsoku (程順則書軸) (Municipal)
- Documents of Nakanoya in Gabusoka (我部祖河仲ノ屋文書) (Municipal)
- Emaki painting "Genuine Views of the Ryūkyū Islands" (「琉球嶌真景」絵巻) (Municipal)
- Former Kunigami Agricultural College Entrance (旧国頭農学校玄関) (National)
- "Hope Sculpture" in Nago Elementary School (名護小学校の「のぞみの像」) (Municipal)
- Kogachi ware ameyu (brown)-glazed funerary jar (古我知焼壷型飴釉厨子甕) (Municipal)
- Kogachi ware black glazed funerary jar (No. 924) (古我知焼壷型黒釉厨子甕 (登録924)) (Municipal)
- Kogachi ware black glazed funerary jar (No. 2504) (古我知焼壷型黒釉厨子甕 (登録2504)) (Municipal)
- Kogachi ware black glazed funerary jar (No. 4739-2) (古我知焼壷型黒釉厨子甕 (登録4739-2)) (Municipal)
- Kogachi ware black glazed jar with handles (古我知焼黒釉耳付壷) (Municipal)
- Kogachi ware kwadīsā-glazed funerary jar (古我知焼壷型クヮディーサー釉厨子甕) (Municipal)
- Kogachi ware small unglazed water jar (古我知焼焼締小型水甕) (Municipal)
- Kogachi ware udun-shaped funerary urn (No. 6019) (古我知焼御殿型厨子甕 (登録6019)) (Municipal)
- Kogachi ware udun-shaped funerary urn (No. 6020) (古我知焼御殿型厨子甕 (登録6020)) (Municipal)
- Kogachi ware water basin (古我知焼水盤) (Municipal)
- Kugō Residence in Yabu (屋部の久護家) (Prefectural)
- Sanpu Ryūmyaku-hi stele (三府龍脉碑) (Prefecture)
- Tsuboya ware unglazed jar and lid with four handles (壷屋焼焼締四耳蓋付壷) (Municipal)
- Tsukayama Distillery (津嘉山酒造所施設) (National)
- Uēki Residence in Genka (Genka Uēki) (源河ウェーキ) (Municipal)

=== Folk Cultural Properties ===
- Dolphin hunting and fishing tools (ピトゥ狩漁具) (Municipal)
- Gabu funerary implements (我部の葬具一式) (Municipal)
- Gabusoka raised storehouse (名護市我部祖河の高倉) (Prefectural)
- Janagusuku raised storehouse (謝名城の高倉) (Municipal)
- Kan'nondō Shrine in Kushi (久志の観音堂) (Municipal)
- Kubo-no-Utaki Sacred Site in Awa (安和のくばのうたき) (Prefectural)
- Survey stones at Nago Museum (名護博物館収蔵のハル石) (Municipal)
- Ukkā-nu-Bijuru Sacred Site in Teniya (天仁屋ウッカーヌビジュル) (Municipal)

=== Historic Sites ===
- Bansachi Beacon Site in Teniya (天仁屋バンサチの火立跡) (Municipal)
- Haneji River Improvement Works Memorial (改決羽地川碑記) (Prefectural)
- Kogachi ware Kiln Site (古我知焼窯跡) (Prefectural)
- Kushi Magiri Banjo Guards House spring (久志間切番所ガー) (Municipal)
- Salterns Site of Gabu (我部の塩田跡) (Municipal)
- Survey stone of Kōchi Matakauchibaru ウ (幸地又かうち原のハル石 ウ) (Municipal)
- Survey stone of Kōchi Matakauchibaru ぬ (幸地又かうち原のハル石 ぬ) (Municipal)
- Survey stone of Kogachi Uchiharabaru (古我知うちはら原のハル石) (Municipal)
- Survey stone of Sedake Sentachibaru (瀬嵩さんたち原のハル石) (Municipal)
- Temiji spring in Kyoda (許田の手水) (Municipal)
- Urandā-baka (Foreigners' tomb) (ウランダー墓) (Municipal)
- Yagaji Untenbaru Sabaya Shell Mound (屋我地運天原サバヤ貝塚) (Prefectural)

=== Places of scenic beauty ===
- Bansachi Beacon Site in Teniya (天仁屋バンサチの火立跡) (Municipal)
- Todoroki Falls (轟の滝) (Prefectural)
- Tsukayama Distillery Gardens (津嘉山酒造所庭園) (National)

=== Natural Monuments ===
- Banyan tree of Abu Uganju praying site (安部拝所のガジマル) (Municipal)
- Camellia trees Camellia japonica L. in the garden of the Ashagi Sacred Site of Nakaoji (仲尾次アシャギ庭のヤブツバキ群) (Municipal)
- Chinaberry tree of Sekita Elementary School (瀬喜田小学校のセンダン) (Municipal)
- Deigo tree of Yabu Elementary School Erythrina variegata (屋部小学校のデイゴ) (Municipal)
- Ginkgo tree of Ōura (大浦のイチョウ) (Municipal)
- Kayō folds (名護市嘉陽層の褶曲) (National)
- Mangrove forest of Ōura (大浦のマングローブ林) (Municipal)
- Miyazato Mee-nu-utaki lantern-tree forest Hernandia nymphaeaefolia Kubizki (宮里前の御嶽のハスノハギリ林) (Prefectural)
- Mount Katsuu, Mount Awa, and Mount Yae Nature Reserve (嘉津宇岳安和岳八重岳自然保護区) (Prefectural)
- Nago Guards House Site's fukugi trees Garcinia subelliptica (名護番所跡のフクギ群) (Prefectural)
- Nago's "Hinpun Gajumaru" banyan tree Ficus macrocarpa (名護のひんぷんガジュマル) (National)
- Okami-matsu (ukami-māchi) sacred pine tree of Sokoniya (底仁屋の御神松) (Municipal)
- Okinawan oak tree of Ōshittai Quercus miyagii (大湿帯のオキナワウラジロガシ) (Municipal)
- Powder-puff tree of Makiya Barringtonia racemosa (真喜屋のサガリバナ) (Municipal)
- Saion Pine of Kawakami (川上の蔡温松)
- Sea almond tree lane of Yaga (屋我のコバテイシ並木) (Municipal)
- Sea fig tree of Sumuide Ficus superba (済井出のアコウ) (Municipal)
- Sea fig tree of Yagaji Elementary School Ficus superba (屋我地小学校のアコウ) (Municipal)
- Sea mango tree of Agarie Cerbera manghas (東江のミフクラギ) (Municipal)
- Ubame oak tree of Kyoda Quercus phillyraeoides (許田のウバメガシ) (Municipal)
