= Break the Rules =

Break the Rules may refer to:

- Break the Rules (album), a 2000 album by Namie Amuro
- "Break the Rules" (Charli XCX song)
- "Break the Rules", a song by Simon Viklund and Phil Bardowell from Payday 2
- "Break the Rules" (Status Quo song)

== See also ==
- "Break the Rules Tonite", a song by Kim Carnes
