= Ginoza, Okinawa =

Ginoza 宜野座村 Jinuza
- Village
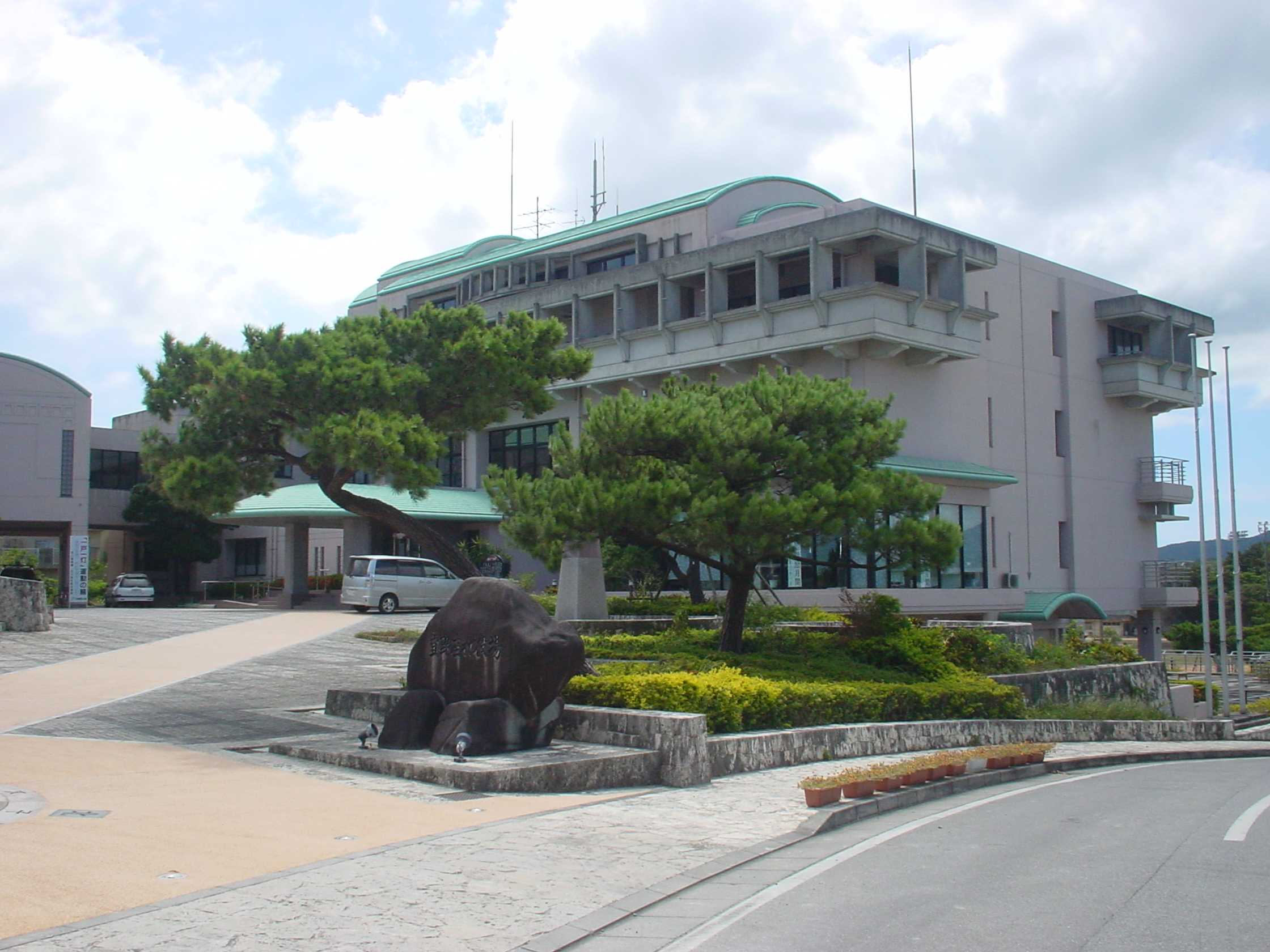
- Ginoza Village Office

- Flag Emblem

- Location of Ginoza in Okinawa Prefecture

- Location in Japan
- Coordinates: 26°28′54″N 127°58′32″E
- Country: Japan
- Region: Kyushu (Okinawa)
- Prefecture: Okinawa Prefecture
- District: Kunigami

Government
  - Mayor: Atsushi Tōma

Area
  - Total: 31.28 km^{2} (12.08 sq mi)

Population (March 2022)
  - Total: 6,227
  - Density: 199.1/km^{2} (515.6/sq mi)
- Time zone: UTC+09:00 (JST)
- City hall address: 296 Ginoza; Ginoza, Kunigami-gun; Okinawa Prefecture; 904-1392
- Website: www.vill.ginoza.okinawa.jp(in Japanese)
- Symbols
- Bird: Japanese white-eye
- Flower: Rhododendron
- Tree: Ryūkyū pine

Ginoza (Japanese: 宜野座村, Hepburn: Ginoza-son; Okinawan: Jinuza) is a village located in Kunigami District, Okinawa Prefecture, Japan.

As of March 2022, the village had a population of 6,227. The total area of Ginoza is 31.28 square kilometres (12.08 mi^{2}), around 50% of the land area of the village is used as the Central Training Area for the United States military.

== Etymology ==
The kanji for Ginoza (宜野座), meaning "a suitable place on the plain".

== Geography ==
Ginoza is located on the eastern coast of the middle of the island of Okinawa. The village is located on the backbone of mountains that run north to south on Okinawa Island, and slopes gently to a broad coastline along the Pacific Ocean.

=== Neighboring municipalities ===
Ginoza borders three municipalities in Okinawa Prefecture.

- Kin
- Nago
- Onna

=== Administrative divisions ===
Ginoza is divided into six districts (aza):

- Fukuyama (福山)
- Ginoza (宜野座)
- Kanna (漢那)
- Matsuda (松田)
- Shirohara (城原)
- Sokei (惣慶)

== History ==
Ginoza developed as an agricultural area within Kin magiri of the Ryukyu administrative system; it was established as a village in 1908 when Kin magiri was divided. Before World War II, some residents emigrated overseas. During the Battle of Okinawa, civilians moved through the area and local facilities were repurposed; temporary postwar displacement followed, after which residents returned. About half of the village area is now occupied by U.S. military training facilities.

== Culture ==
The Ginoza Village Museum opened in 1994.

== Cultural Properties ==
- Name (Japanese) (Type of registration)

=== Cultural Properties ===
- Former Kochiya Village (currently Matsuda) kumi-odori texts (旧古知屋村(現松田区)組踊写本6冊) (Municipal)
- Genealogical records of the Tan Clan: branch line (「湛姓家譜」支流一冊) (Municipal)
- Genealogical records of the Kyoda Family and related ancient documents (許田家所蔵の家譜及び関連古文書類) (Municipal)
- Kanna Uē-nu-atai Site (漢那ウェーヌアタイ遺跡)
- Materials from Ginoza Village relating to the Battle of Okinawa (沖縄戦関連宜野座村資料) (Municipal)
- Mē-gā Site (メーガー遺跡)
- Ginoza Ukkā Gushiku Site (宜野座大川グシク)

=== Folk Cultural Properties ===
- Ginoza Nuru Dunchi residence (宜野座ヌル殿内)
- Kanna shrine (漢那のお宮)
- Kushi-nu-utaki sacred site (クシヌ御嶽)
- Sokei-no-ugan sacred site (惣慶のウガン)
- Yuuagi-mō meadows (ユウアギモー)

=== Natural Monuments ===
- Old tree of Uē-nu-atai (ウェーヌアタイの古木)
- Pine tree lane of the former Matsuda Hippodrome (松田の馬場跡の松並木) (Municipal)

== Economy ==
Agricultural production remains high in Ginoza. Like other areas of Okinawa, the village produces sugarcane. Cut flowers production, which has spread rapidly to other municipalities in Okinawa Prefecture, has also been developed in Ginoza. The village produces of chrysanthemums and orchids. Tropical fruit, specifically pineapples and mangoes, is also a developing part of the agricultural sector Ginoza. Additionally, strawberries and potatoes are grown in Ginoza.

Rent from land used for military bases by the United States remains a large source of income in the Ginoza. The village government has attempted to diversify the economy of Ginoza, but dependence on rental income remains high.

== Government ==
Under the Local Autonomy Law of 1947 the government of Ginoza consists of an elected village council, an elected mayor, and administrative committees and departments under control of the mayor. Ginoza, with a population of under 6,000 residents, has a village council consisting of 12 members. Members of the council and the mayor serve a four-year term. The mayor of Ginoza is Atsushi Tōma.

== Education ==
Ginoza operates three elementary schools (Matsuda (松田小学校), Kanna (漢那小学校), and Ginoza (宜野座小学校) Elementary Schools) and one junior high school (Ginoza Junior High School (宜野座中学校)).

The Okinawa Prefectural Board of Education operates Ginoza High School.

== Transportation ==
=== Road ===
Ginoza is crossed by Japan National Route 329, national highway which connects Nago, Okinawa and Naha, Okinawa, and the Okinawa Expressway. The Ginoza Interchange connects JNR 329 and the Okinawan Expressway.
