= Think of Me / No More Tears =

"Think of Me"/"No More Tears"

Single by Namie Amuro

from the album Break the Rules
- Released: January 24, 2001
- Recorded: Larrabee Sound Studios; TK Disc
- Length: 22:06
- Label: Avex Trax

Namie Amuro singles chronology
"Please Smile Again" (2000)	"Think of Me"/"No More Tears" (2001)	"Say the Word" (2001)

Alternative cover
- Vinyl artwork for "No More Tears"

"Think of Me / No More Tears" is Namie Amuro's 18th single under the Avex Trax label, released on January 24, 2001.

== Commercial endorsement ==
Think of Me was the theme song of a commercial for Meiji Fran products and No More Tears was used in a Kose Visee Luminous lipstick commercial. Namie featured in both commercials.

== Track listing ==
1. Think of Me – 4:46
2. No More Tears – 5:47
3. I To You – 4:43
4. No More Tears (Club Dub) – 6:56

== Charts ==
The single opened at #7 with 55,920 copies sold in its first week and it sold 112,670 units. It charted for 5 weeks.
