= 2021 Pacific typhoon season =

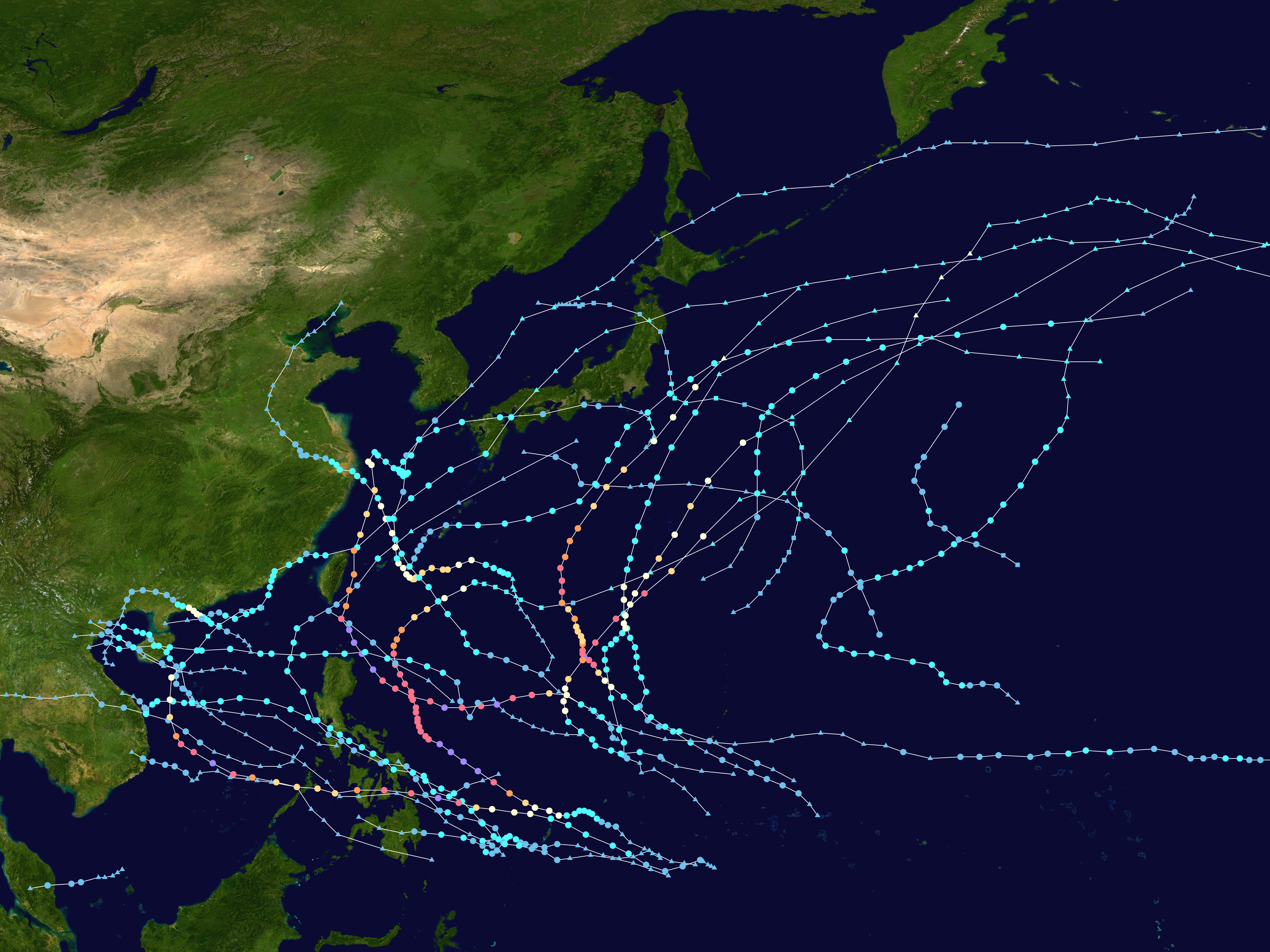
- Season summary map

Seasonal boundaries
- First system formed: January 19, 2021
- Last system dissipated: December 21, 2021

Strongest storm
- Name: Surigae
  - Maximum winds: 220 km/h (140 mph) (10-minute sustained)
  - Lowest pressure: 895 hPa (mbar)

Seasonal statistics
- Total depressions: 41, 1 unofficial
- Total storms: 22
- Typhoons: 9
- Very strong typhoons: 6
- Violent typhoons: 4
- Total fatalities: 579 total
- Total damage: $4.14 billion (2021 USD)

Related articles
- 2021 Atlantic hurricane season; 2021 Pacific hurricane season; 2021 North Indian Ocean cyclone season

The 2021 Pacific typhoon season was the second consecutive season to have below average tropical cyclone activity, with twenty-two named storms, and was the least active since 2011. Nine became typhoons, and five of those intensified into super typhoons. This low activity was caused by a strong La Niña that had persisted from the previous year. The season's first named storm, Dujuan, developed on February 16, while the last named storm, Rai, dissipated on December 21. The season ran throughout 2021, though most tropical cyclones typically develop between May and October. The season's first typhoon, Surigae, reached typhoon status on April 16. It became the first super typhoon of the year on the next day, also becoming the strongest tropical cyclone in 2021. Surigae was also the most powerful tropical cyclone on record in the Northern Hemisphere for the month of April. Typhoons In-fa and Rai are responsible for more than half of the total damage this season, adding up to a combined total of $2.02 billion. (Note: All damage totals are valued as of 2021 and in United States dollars, unless otherwise noted.)

The scope of this article is limited to the Pacific Ocean to the north of the equator between 100°E and 180th meridian. Within the northwestern Pacific Ocean, there are two separate agencies that assign names to tropical cyclones, which can often result in a cyclone having two names. The Japan Meteorological Agency (JMA) (Note: The Japan Meteorological Agency is the official Regional Specialized Meteorological Center for the western Pacific Ocean.) named tropical cyclones that were judged to have 10-minute sustained wind speeds of at least 65 km/h (40 mph) anywhere in the basin, whilst the Philippine Atmospheric, Geophysical and Astronomical Services Administration (PAGASA) assigned names to tropical cyclones which moved into or formed as a tropical depression in their area of responsibility located between 135°E and 115°E and between 5°N and 25°N, regardless of whether or not a tropical cyclone has already been given a name by the JMA. Tropical depressions that were monitored by the United States' Joint Typhoon Warning Center (JTWC) (Note: The Joint Typhoon Warning Center is a joint United States Navy – United States Air Force task force that issues tropical cyclone warnings for the western Pacific Ocean and other regions.) were given a number with a "W" suffix.

== Seasonal forecasts ==
TSR forecasts Date	Tropical storms	Total Typhoons	Intense TCs	ACE	Ref.
Average (1965–2020)	26	16	9	294	
May 11, 2021	24	15	9	270	
July 7, 2021	25	15	9	265	
August 9, 2021	25	13	7	230	
Other forecasts Date	Forecast Center	Period		Systems	Ref.
December 27, 2020	PAGASA	January–March		0–3 tropical cyclones	
December 27, 2020	PAGASA	April–June		1–4 tropical cyclones	
June 23, 2021	PAGASA	July–September		5–9 tropical cyclones	
June 23, 2021	PAGASA	October–December		5–8 tropical cyclones	
2021 season	Forecast Center	Tropical cyclones	Tropical storms	Typhoons	Ref.
Actual activity:	JMA	40	22	9	
Actual activity:	JTWC	29	26	10	
Actual activity:	PAGASA	15	11	5	

During the year, several national meteorological services and scientific agencies forecast how many tropical cyclones, tropical storms, and typhoons will form during a season and/or how many tropical cyclones will affect a particular country. These agencies included the Tropical Storm Risk (TSR) Consortium of University College London, PAGASA and Taiwan's Central Weather Bureau. The first forecast was released by PAGASA on December 27, 2020, in their monthly seasonal climate outlook predicting the first half of 2021. The PAGASA predicts that only 0–3 tropical cyclones are expected to form or enter the Philippine Area of Responsibility between January and March, while 1–4 tropical cyclones are expected to form between April and June. PAGASA also predicted that the ongoing La Niña could persist until the end of the first quarter of 2021. Tropical Storm Risk (TSR) issued their first extended range forecast on May 11, predicting a slightly below-average season with 24 tropical storms, 15 typhoons and 9 intense typhoons.

On June 23, the PAGASA released their monthly climate outlook for the rest of 2021, predicting 5 to 9 tropical cyclones developing or entering their area of responsibility from July to September, and 5 to 8 tropical cyclones from October to December. TSR issued an update to their forecast on July 7, reiterating their expectations for slightly below-average activity. On August 9, TSR issued their final forecast for the season, slightly lowering their numbers to 25 named storms, 13 typhoons and 7 intense typhoons.

== Systems ==
=== Tropical Storm Dujuan (Auring) ===
- Tropical storm (JMA)
- Tropical storm (SSHWS)
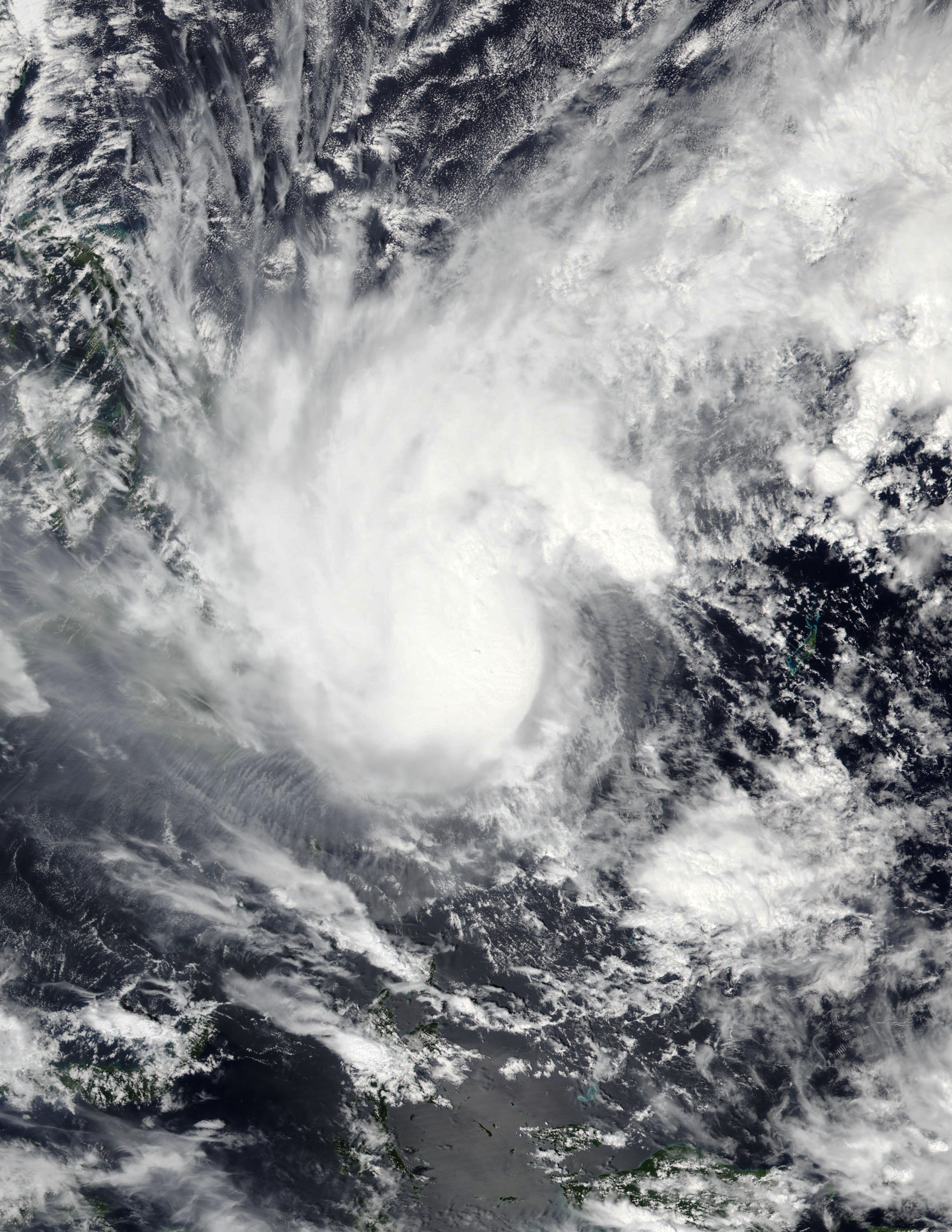
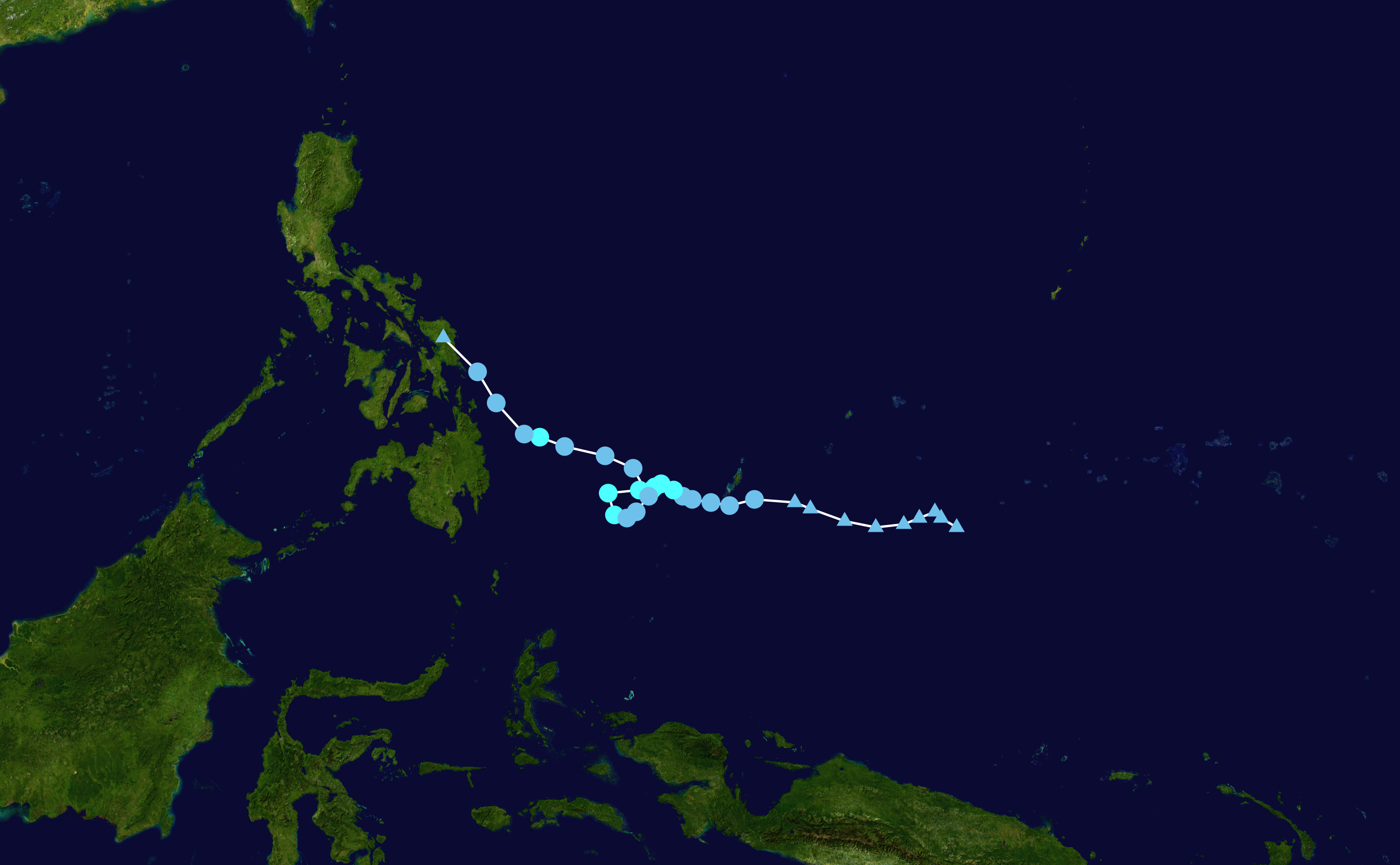
- Duration: February 16 – February 23
- Peak intensity: 75 km/h (45 mph) (10-min); 996 hPa (mbar)

At 06:00 UTC on February 16, the JMA reported that a tropical depression had formed. Eight hours later, the JTWC issued a Tropical Cyclone Formation Alert (TCFA) for the system. By February 17, the system moved into the Philippine Area of Responsibility (PAR), and was assigned the local name Auring from the PAGASA. At 06:00 UTC on the same day, the JTWC upgraded the system to a tropical depression, giving it the designation 01W. The system was later named Dujuan as the first named storm of 2021. The PAGASA later upgraded Dujuan to a severe tropical storm; however, this only lasted for six hours. On February 20, the storm significantly weakened into a tropical depression due to high vertical wind shear. Both JMA and JTWC issued their final advisories moments after. The storm made landfall over Batag Island in Laoang, Northern Samar at 09:00 PHT (01:00 UTC) on February 22, dissipating thereafter.

Dujuan briefly moved over Palau on February 16 as a tropical depression, bringing heavy rainfall to parts of the country. Classes and government work were suspended on February 22 in parts of Eastern Visayas and Central Visayas, including Surigao del Sur. A total of 242,194 individuals were affected in Northern Mindanao, Caraga, and in the Davao Region. At least 77,811 of the affected individuals were taken to 344 various evacuation shelters in each region. One person was reported dead with four others reported missing, with total damages to agriculture and infrastructure amounting to ₱159.8 million (US$3.29 million).

=== Typhoon Surigae (Bising) ===
- Violent typhoon (JMA)
- Category 5 super typhoon (SSHWS)
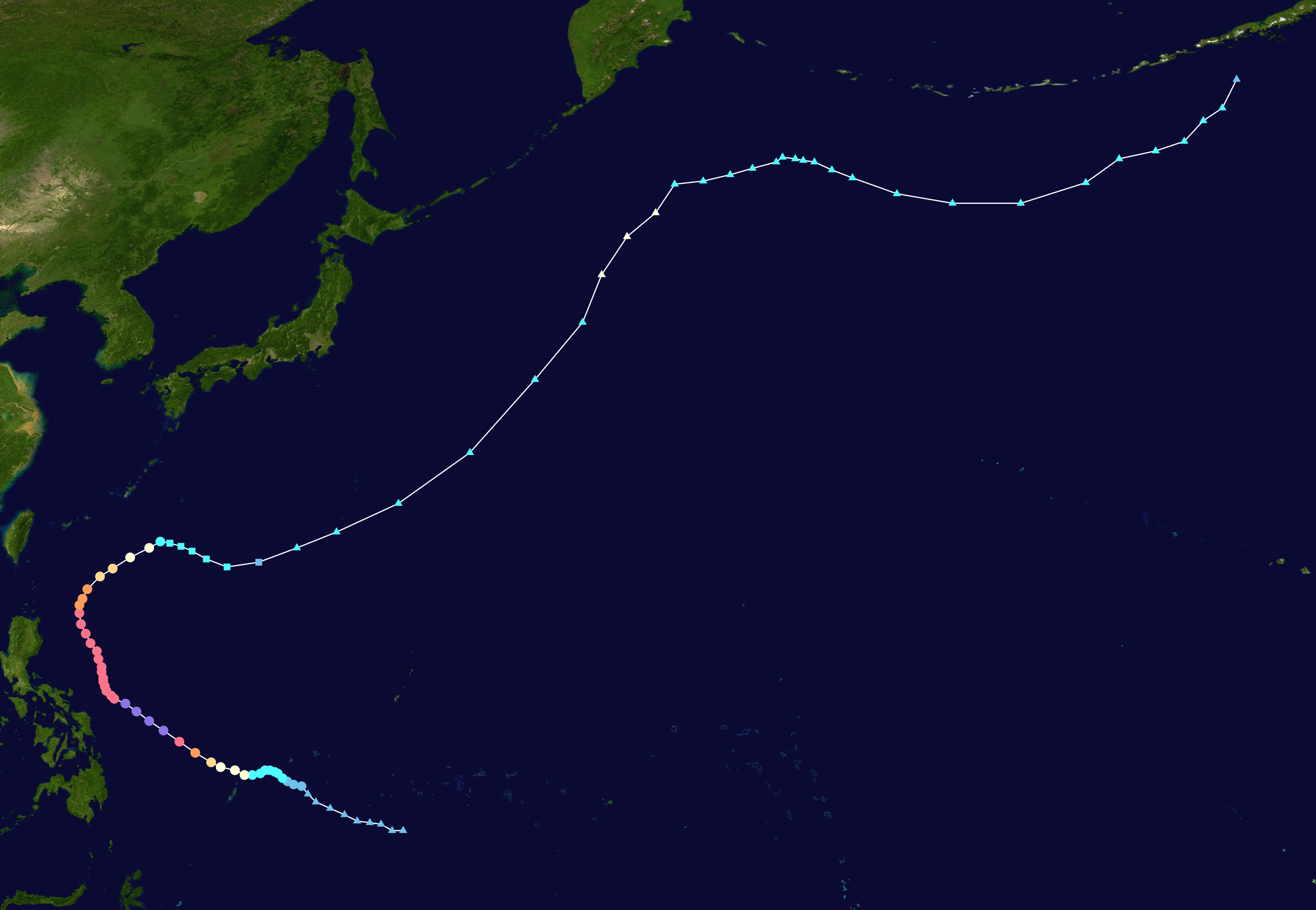
- Duration: April 12 – April 24
- Peak intensity: 220 km/h (140 mph) (10-min); 895 hPa (mbar)

A low-pressure area south of Woleai developed into a tropical depression on April 12. A few hours later, the JTWC issued a TCFA for the developing storm, with the PAGASA beginning to issue advisories for the tropical depression as it remained outside of the PAR. On April 13, the JTWC upgraded the system to a tropical depression and assigned it the designation 02W. At 18:00 UTC, the JMA upgraded the cyclone to a tropical storm and named it Surigae. On April 15 at 00:00 UTC, the JMA upgraded Surigae to a severe tropical storm as an eye began forming. Later that day, the JTWC upgraded the storm to a typhoon, making it the first of the season. Surigae then entered the PAGASA's Philippine Area of Responsibility, getting the local name Bising. Surigae continued to rapidly intensify until it reached Category 5-equivalent super typhoon status, becoming the most intense typhoon ever recorded in the month of April. Surigae soon reached its peak intensity, with a minimum central pressure of 895 millibars (26.43 inHg), 10-minute maximum sustained winds of 220 km/h (140 mph), and 1-minute sustained winds of 315 km/h (195 mph). A few days later, on April 22, Surigae began to weaken again, with the storm's structure deteriorating and its large eye dissipating. Soon afterward, all of the remaining convection was sheared to the east as the storm moved over cooler waters. Late on April 24, JTWC and JMA declared and issued their final advisory that Surigae had become extratropical.

Winds of up to 30 mph (50 km/h) were recorded in Yap on that day as Surigae passed from the southwest. Damage in Palau was estimated at US$4.8 million. Very strong winds and heavy rains affected the eastern part of the Philippines, with storm surge inundating parts of coastline nearest to the typhoon. Surigae killed a total of 8 people and left another 10 missing. The storm also caused at least ₱272.55 million (US$5.65 million) in damages.

=== Tropical Depression 03W (Crising) ===
- Tropical depression (JMA)
- Tropical storm (SSHWS)
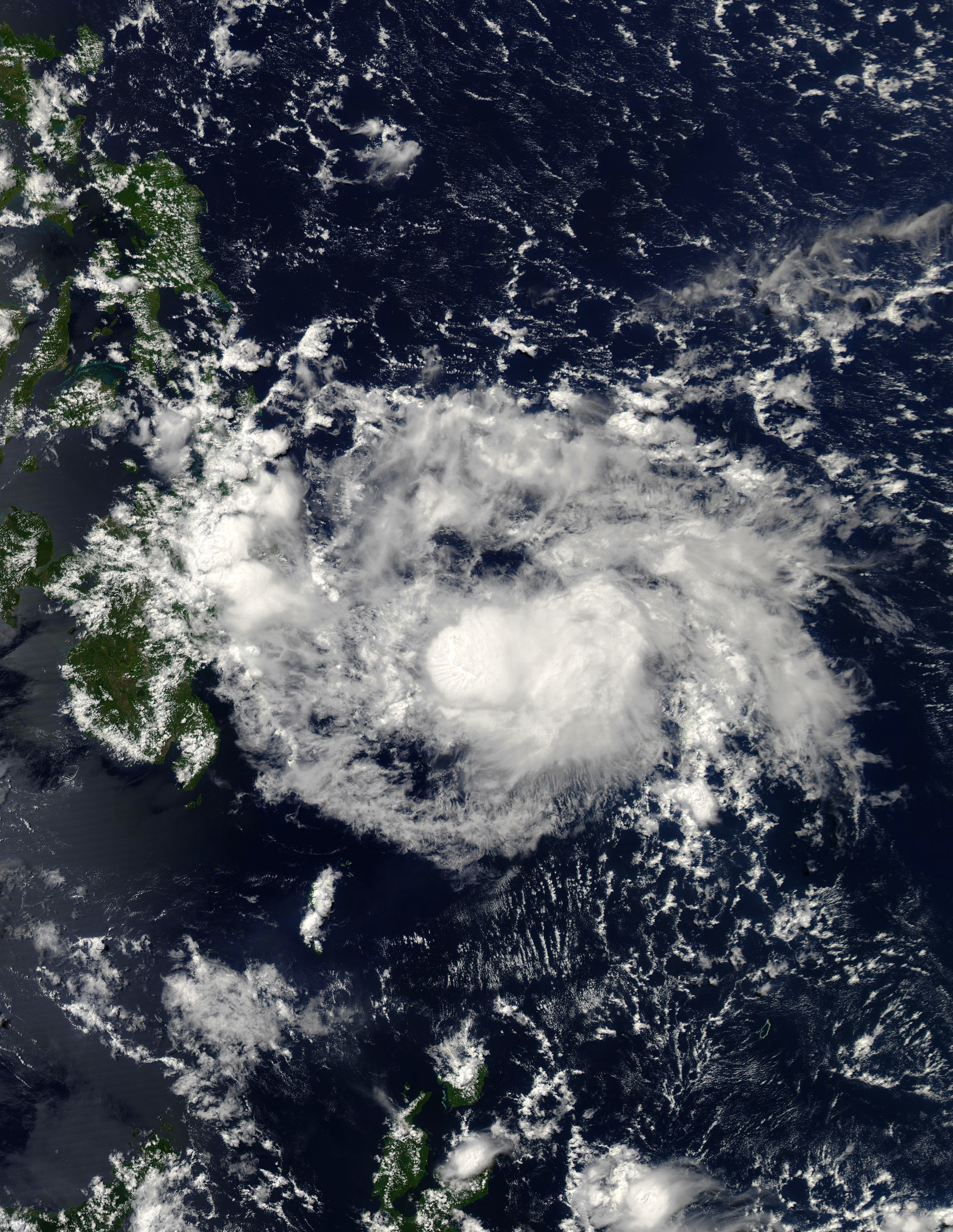
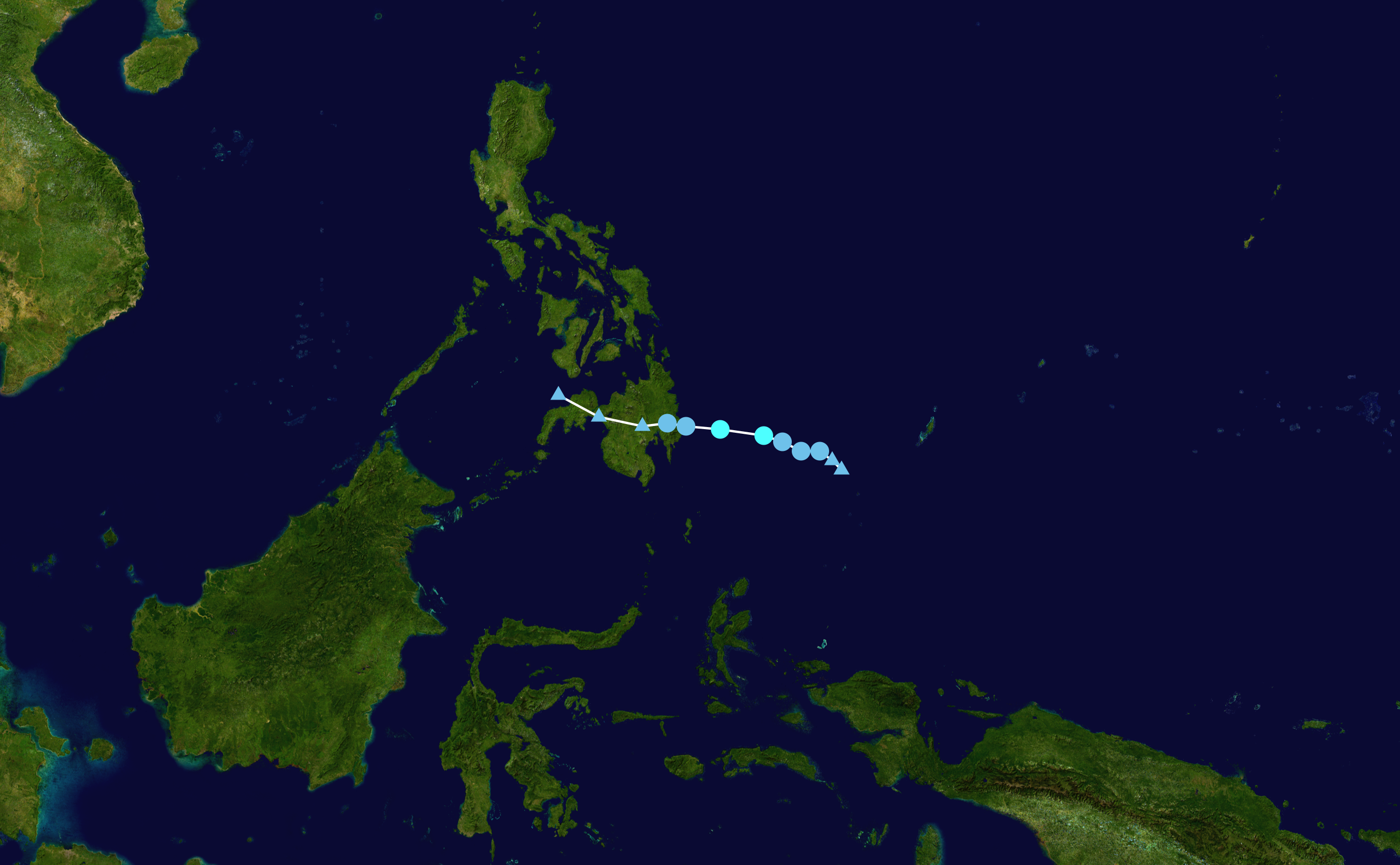
- Duration: May 12 – May 14
- Peak intensity: 55 km/h (35 mph) (10-min); 1002 hPa (mbar)

On May 11, the JTWC noted a persistent area of convection in the Philippine Sea, approximately 184 nmi (341 km) west of Palau. The JTWC issued a TCFA for the convection on May 12, as it further developed in an environment with low vertical wind shear and warm sea surface temperatures. Just three hours later, the agency recognized that the area of convection had quickly consolidated into a tropical depression and assigned it with the identifier of 03W. Around the same time, the JMA had also recognized the storm as a tropical depression while it was to the east of Mindanao. Since the storm developed within the Philippine Area of Responsibility, the PAGASA immediately named the storm Crising once the agency recognized it as a tropical depression as well, and later raised Signal No. 2 warnings for areas in Mindanao. In the early hours of May 13, the JTWC upgraded the system into a tropical storm, with the PAGASA following suit hours later. Later that day, Crising's low-level circulation center became exposed due to wind shear, and it lost organization. At 8:20 p.m. Philippine Standard Time (12:20 UTC), Crising made landfall in Baganga, Davao Oriental as a weakening tropical storm. It quickly degraded as soon as it made landfall, with both the JTWC and the PAGASA downgrading it to a tropical depression at 15:00 UTC. At 03:00 UTC on that day, the PAGASA reported that the system degenerated to an area of low-pressure in the vicinity of Piagapo in Lanao del Sur, thus lifting all warning signals on Mindanao and issuing their final advisory. On May 14, the system dissipated over the Sulu Sea, and both the JMA and the JTWC issued their final advisories on the storm.

In preparations for the storm, the local government of Davao Occidental raised a blue alert on May 13, with the authorities in the area preparing rescue equipment in case of emergency. The PAGASA also warned small vessels near the area to stay away from the rough seas caused by the storm. Schools were ordered to be suspended for that day in Davao Occidental, including the submission of modules. When Crising made landfall, it caused widespread rains and flooding across Mindanao and Southern Visayas. Gusty winds were also felt in parts of Mindanao where the storm passed. In Baganga, some trees were knocked down by strong winds, while strong winds with heavy rainfall were reported in Cateel and Boston, all in the province. Three men and a carabao were required to be rescued from the rising Kabacan River in the early hours of May 14; they were successfully released safely from the said river. An evacuation center in South Upi, Maguindanao were reported to be flooded and some crops near the center were submerged in floodwaters, all due to a rising river near the area. Agricultural damages were estimated at ₱23.2 million (US$486,000).

=== Tropical Storm Choi-wan (Dante) ===
- Tropical storm (JMA)
- Tropical storm (SSHWS)
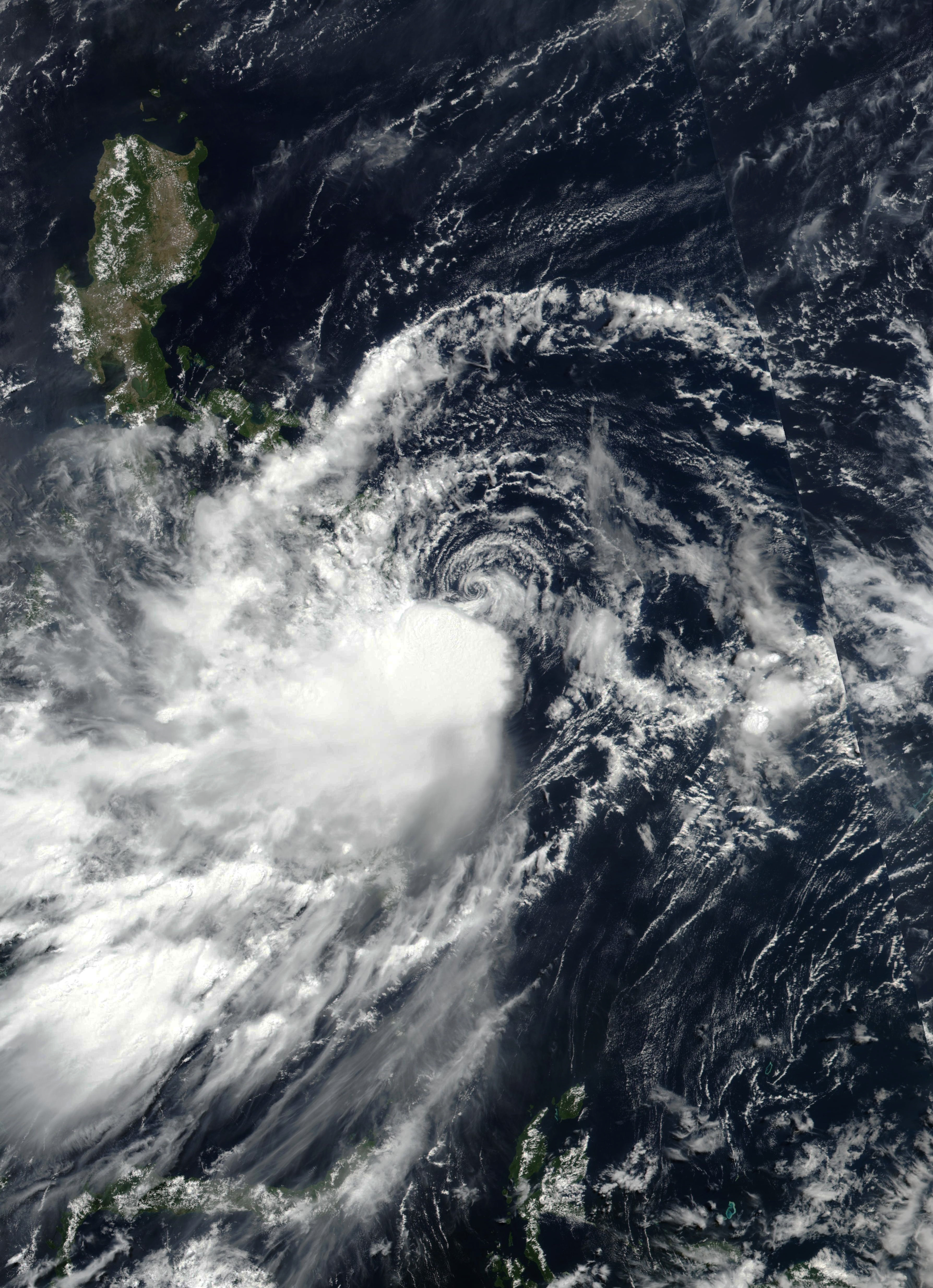
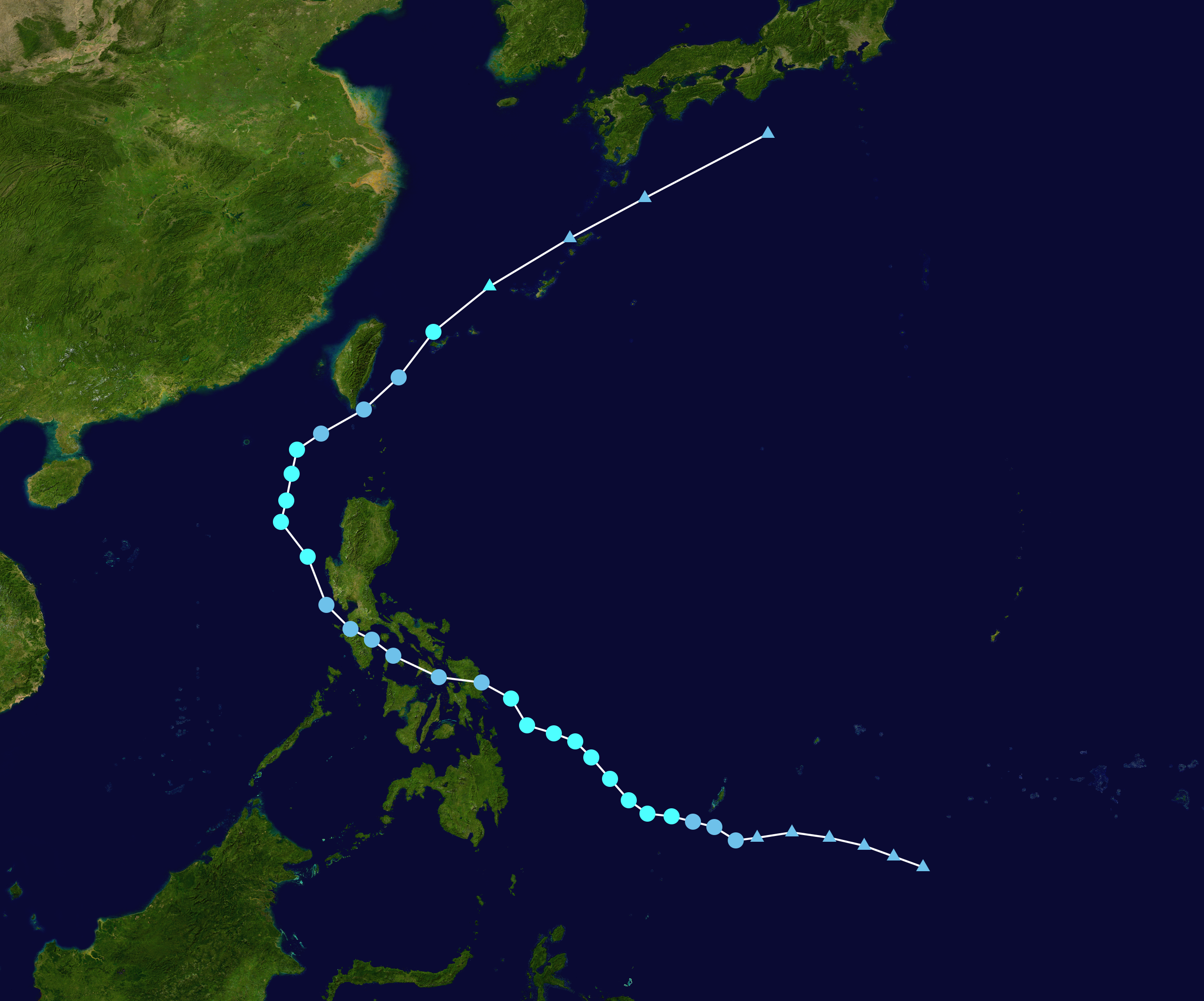
- Duration: May 29 – June 5
- Peak intensity: 75 km/h (45 mph) (10-min); 998 hPa (mbar)

On May 27, the JMA and the JTWC noted the persistence of an area of atmospheric convection about 425 nautical miles (787 km; 489 mi) south-southeast of Guam. The area's nearby environment exhibited low wind shear and warm sea surface temperatures, which were ideal conditions for tropical cyclogenesis. The JMA assessed the area to have developed into a tropical depression on May 29 at 06:00 UTC. The PAGASA made a similar assessment in a Tropical Cyclone Advisory issued at 15:00 UTC. The JTWC later followed with their own assessment, identifying the center of the newly developed tropical depression and assigning the designation 04W. As the system tracked westward, it entered the Philippine Area of Responsibility at 01:00 PHT (17:00 UTC). The PAGASA then named the storm Dante in its first Tropical Cyclone Bulletin for the storm. Dante further organized in the Philippine Sea, and on May 30 at 15:00 UTC, the JTWC upgraded it to a tropical storm, with the PAGASA doing the same at 21:00 UTC. On the next day at 00:00 UTC, the JMA also upgraded Dante into a tropical storm, giving it the international name Choi-wan. Choi-wan's center was exposed due to a tropical upper tropospheric trough from the northeast, inducing shear on the system. On June 1 at 12:30 UTC, Choi-wan made landfall on Sulat, Eastern Samar as a minimal tropical storm, with the JTWC downgrading it to a tropical depression at 15:00 UTC. It made a second landfall on Cataingan at 17:00 UTC. Choi-wan made several more landfalls on the Philippines, making its third landfall on Balud, Masbate at 19:30 UTC. It made a fourth landfall on Romblon, Romblon on June 2 at 00:00 UTC, a fifth on San Agustin, Romblon at 00:50 UTC, a sixth on Pola, Oriental Mindoro at 06:00 UTC, a seventh on Tingloy, Batangas at 11:20 UTC, and an eighth and final landfall on the Calatagan Peninsula before moving into the South China Sea. On June 3 at 03:00 UTC, the JTWC upgraded Choi-wan back to a tropical storm. At 03:00 UTC, the PAGASA removed all Tropical Cyclone Warning Signals as Choi-wan moved away from the country. Choi-wan then exited the PAR on June 3 at 18:00 UTC before weakening into a tropical depression on the next day at 06:00 UTC and re-entering the PAR at 08:00 UTC. Then, it passed southeast of the island of Taiwan before moving out near the Okinawa Prefecture and heading towards Japan. On June 5 at 06:00 UTC, the Japan Meteorological Agency issued their final advisory on the system. 3 hours later at 09:00 UTC, the JTWC upgraded Choi-wan back into a tropical storm, however at 15:00 UTC, the Joint Typhoon Warning Center downgraded the system to a tropical depression, also issuing their final advisory on the system.

Heavy rains caused floods in parts of Mindanao; 11 fatalities were reported, 3 people were injured, and 2 people are missing. As of June 4, 55,226 people were affected and 16,680 people are inside evacuation centers. A total of ₱307.2 million (US$6.39 million) of damages were incurred throughout the country, of which ₱152.1 million (US$3.17 million) was agricultural damages and ₱155.1 million (US$3.23 million) was related to infrastructure. On June 1, classes and government work for parts of Davao de Oro, Eastern Samar, Leyte, and Surigao del Sur were suspended for the day.

=== Tropical Storm Koguma ===
- Tropical storm (JMA)
- Tropical storm (SSHWS)
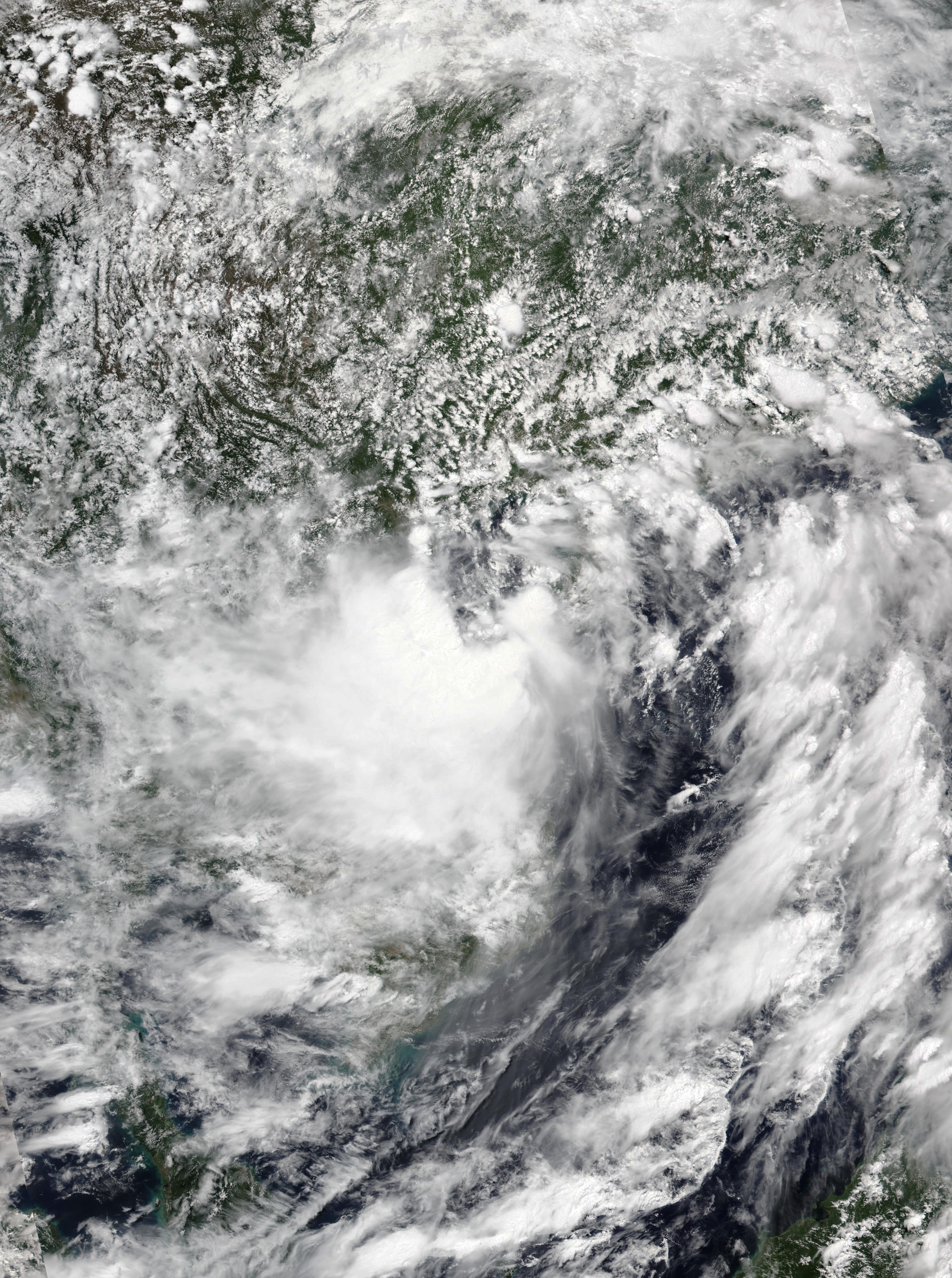
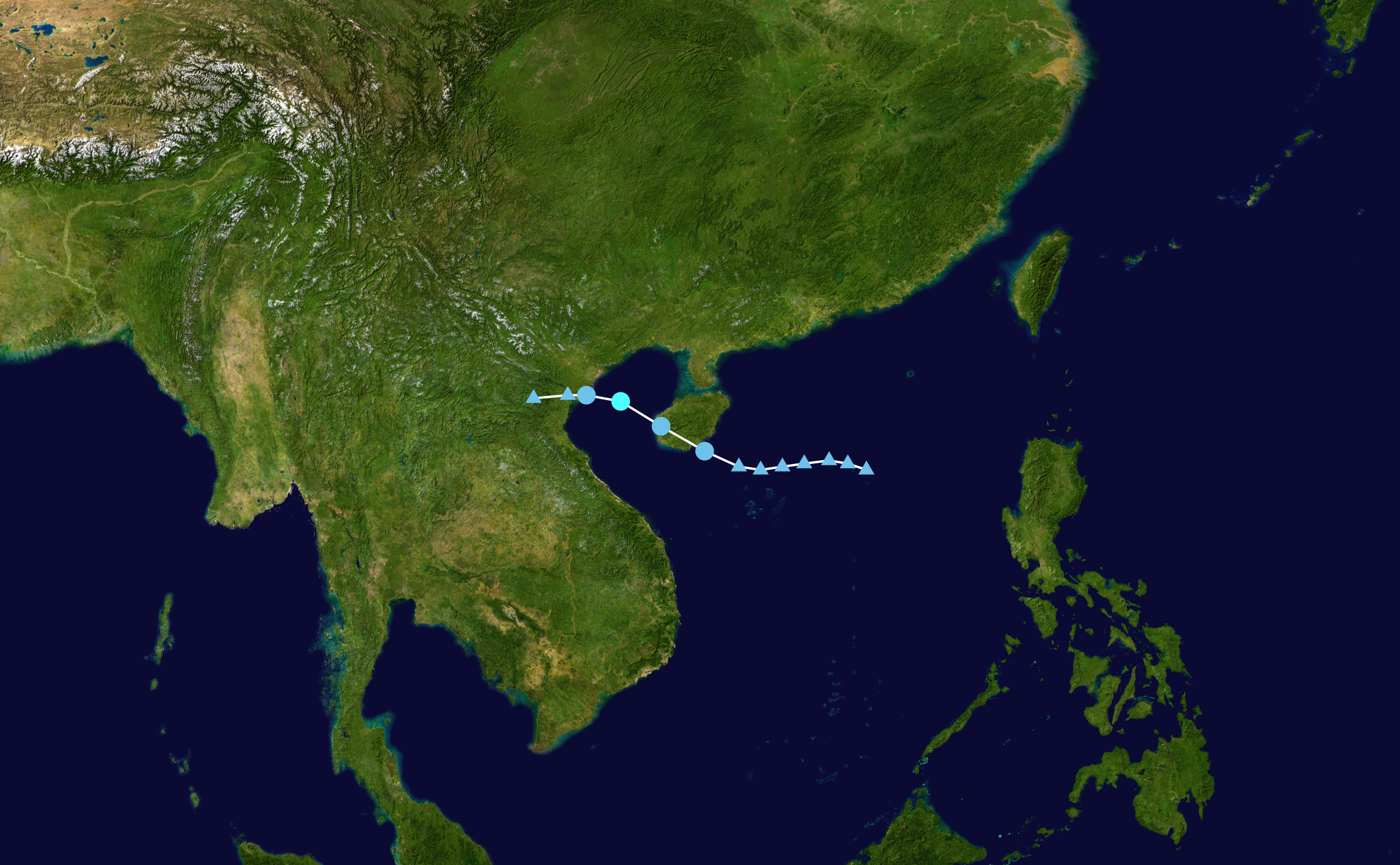
- Duration: June 11 – June 13
- Peak intensity: 65 km/h (40 mph) (10-min); 996 hPa (mbar)

On June 10, the JTWC started to monitor an area of low-pressure in the South China Sea, approximately 518 km (322 mi) to the south of Hong Kong, with the agency classifying the system as a monsoon depression. Tracking west-northwestward, the storm was located in a favorable environment for further development, with warm sea surface temperatures and low wind shear. At 00:00 UTC on June 11, the JMA upgraded the system into a tropical depression. Six hours later, the JTWC issued a TCFA for the system as it began to show characteristics of a monsoon depression. By 18:00 UTC, the JMA upgraded the system to a tropical storm, assigning it the name Koguma. On June 12 at 00:00 UTC, the JTWC upgraded Koguma to a tropical depression, assigning it the designation 05W. Later that day, the JTWC also upgraded Koguma to a tropical storm. By June 12, it had made landfall southeast of Hanoi, and dissipated the next day.

1 person died in Yên Bái province as a result of Koguma.

=== Typhoon Champi ===
- Typhoon (JMA)
- Category 1 typhoon (SSHWS)
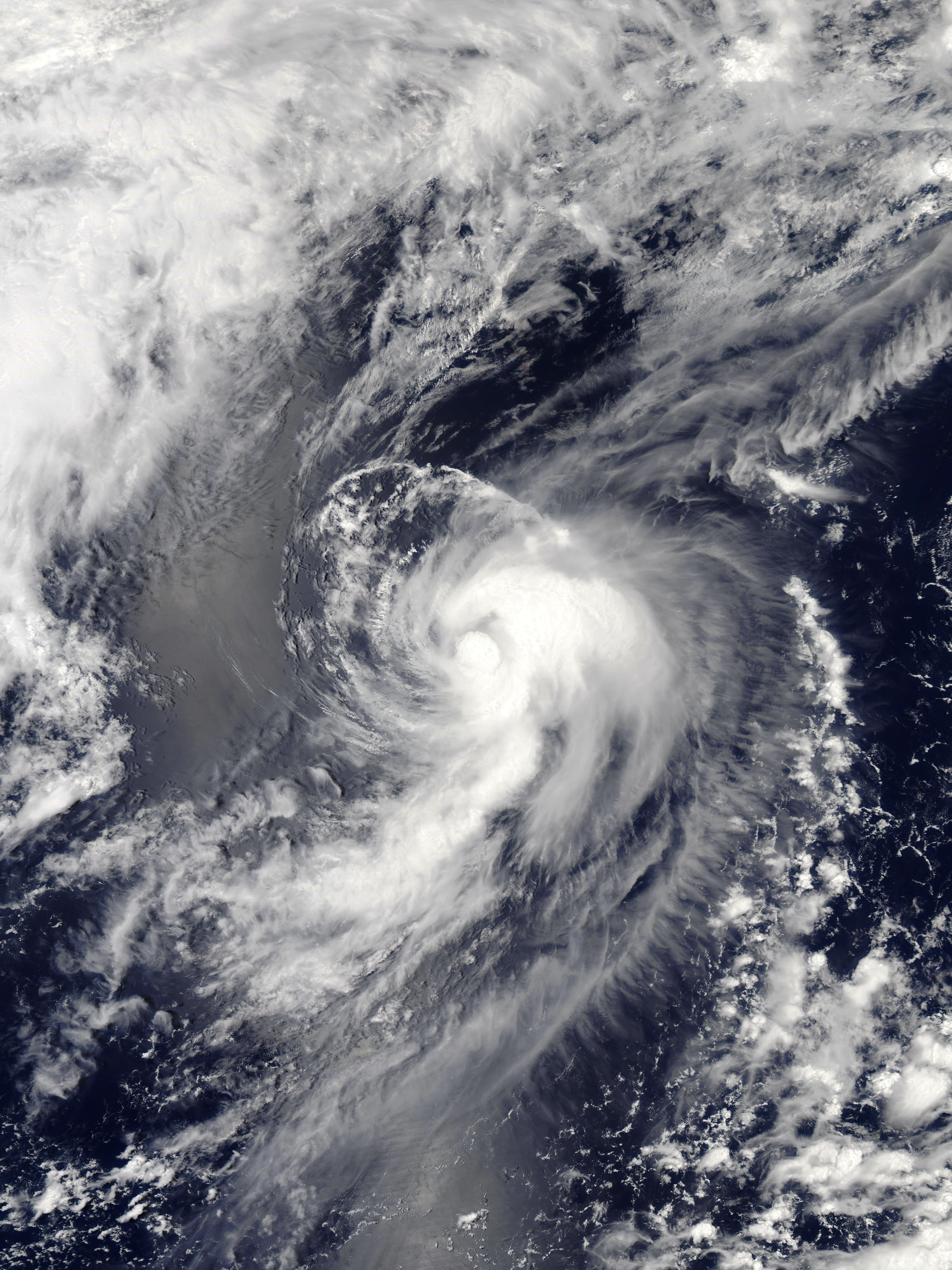
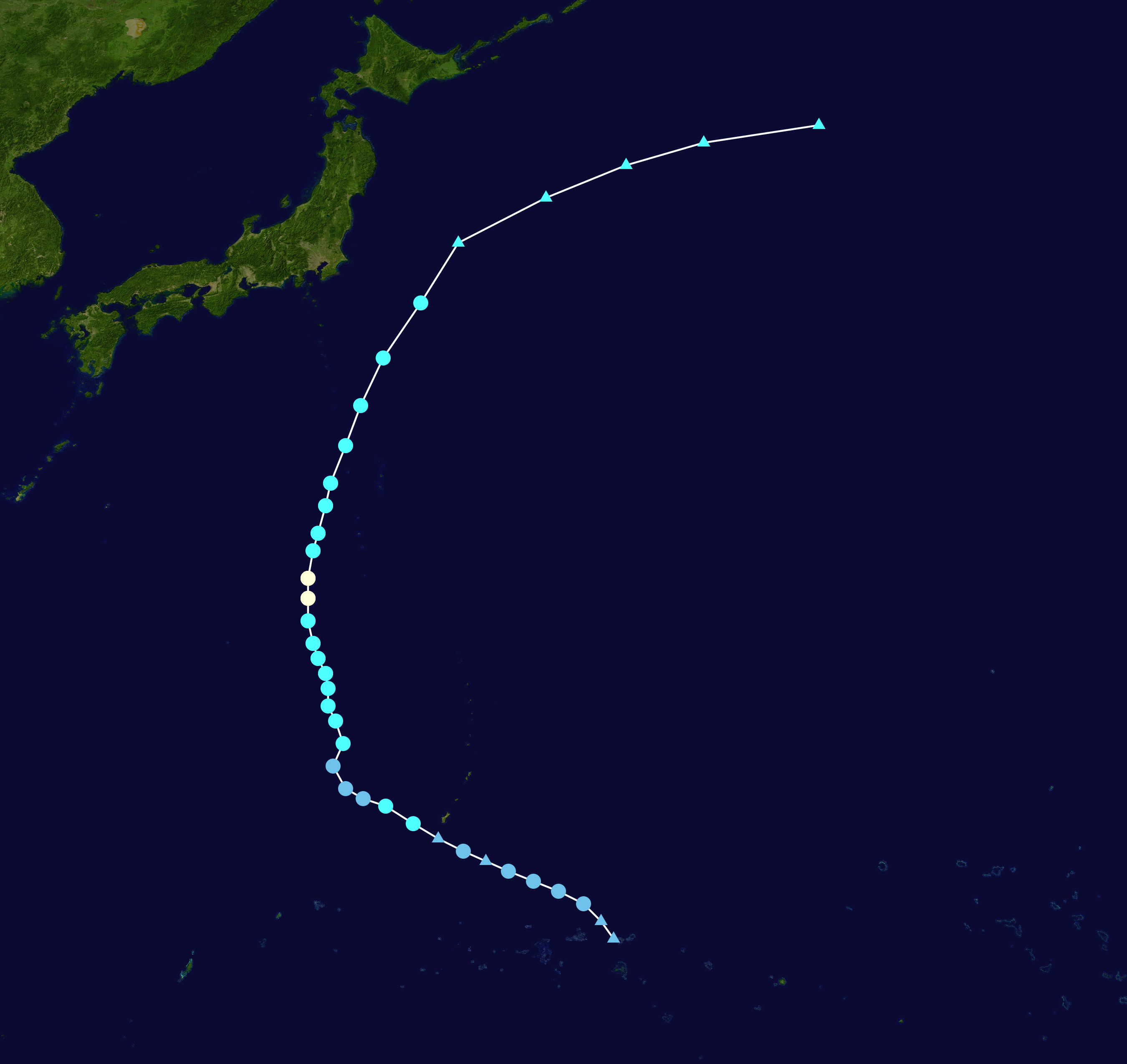
- Duration: June 20 – June 27
- Peak intensity: 120 km/h (75 mph) (10-min); 980 hPa (mbar)

At 00:00 UTC on June 18, the JTWC started to monitor a broad area of convection nearly 250 km (160 mi) to the south-southwest of Pohnpei. The system remained weak as it moved northwestwards in a favorable environment for further intensification, characterized by warm sea surface temperatures, low to moderate wind shear and good outflow; the disturbance remained weak as it moved northwestwards. The JTWC issued a TCFA on the system two days later, though the system remained disorganized. The JMA upgraded the system to a tropical depression at 00:00 UTC on June 21. Meanwhile, the JTWC designated it as 06W in their first advisory on the system, with an exposed LLCC being evident on satellite imagery due to moderate wind shear, being induced by a tropical upper tropospheric trough to its north. By 21:00 on June 21, 06W made its closest passage to the south-southwest of Guam, continuing its northwest track. On June 22, at 06:00 UTC, the JTWC upgraded the system into a tropical storm as it continued to move away from Guam. The JMA followed and upgraded the system into a tropical storm, in June 23 at 00:00 UTC, and assigned it the name Champi. At 18:00 UTC, the JMA upgraded the storm to a severe tropical storm as it turned northwestwards. At this time, a microwave imagery scan of Champi revealed an eye feature emerging in the system; however, this was short lived as dry air continued to impact the storm from the west. In addition, poleward outflow on the system remained weak on June 24, restricting Champi to significantly develop. However, on the next day, as a shortwave trough crossed the Ryukyu Islands, the outflow increased on the storm which allowed it to intensify further. On June 25, at 06:00 UTC, the JMA officially declared the storm a typhoon. The JTWC soon followed, upgrading it into a Category 1-equivalent typhoon. At this time, a Champi turned north and north-northwestwards, and subsequently reached its peak intensity of 120 km/h (75 mph) ten-minute maximum sustained winds with a minimum barometric pressure of 980 hPa (28.94 inHg) by 21:00 UTC on June 25, however it was downgraded to a tropical storm a day later. The storm continued to weaken as it move towards the Japanese islands, until on June 27, the JMA issued its last advisory at 12:00 UTC as the system became an extratropical low. The JTWC also issued its last warning for Champi at 09:00 UTC, same day.

In the wake of the tropical depression, the National Weather Service in Guam issued a tropical storm watch for Rota in the Northern Mariana Islands and a tropical storm warning for the whole island of Guam on June 21. Marine and flash flood warnings were also posted on the former and on Saipan, Tinian, and other islands in the east and south, while classes on an elementary and a high school in the latter were suspended the next day due to a reported power outage. Electrical disruptions were also experienced on Chalan Pago, Toto/Canada, and Santa Rita in Guam due to the system's near approach. As it moved away from the island and the Marianas, the watch and warning in those areas were lifted at 01:00 UTC on June 22. In the Bonin Islands, residents in the area were advised of rough seas and gusty winds caused by Champi.

=== Tropical Depression 07W (Emong) ===
- Tropical depression (JMA)
- Tropical depression (SSHWS)
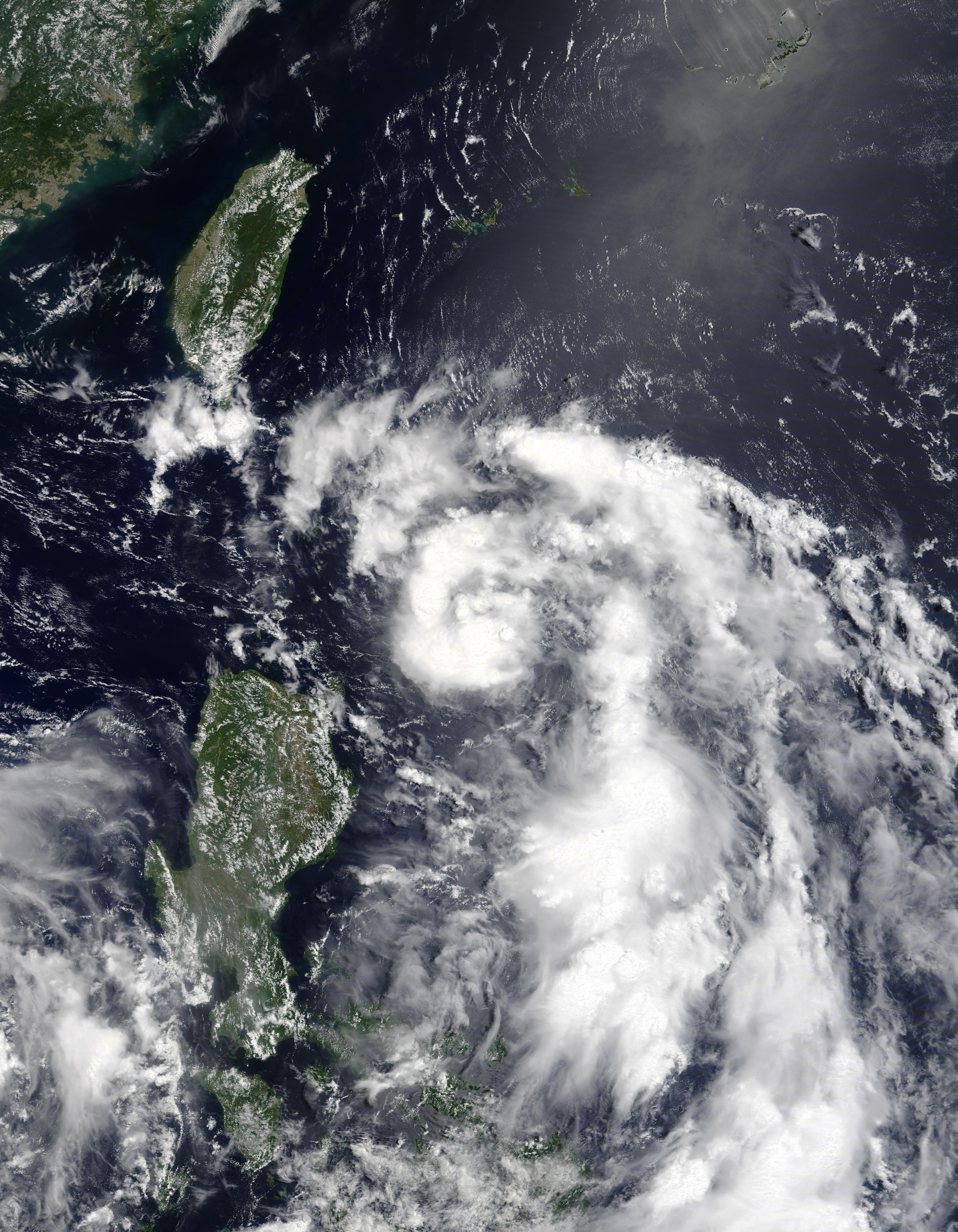
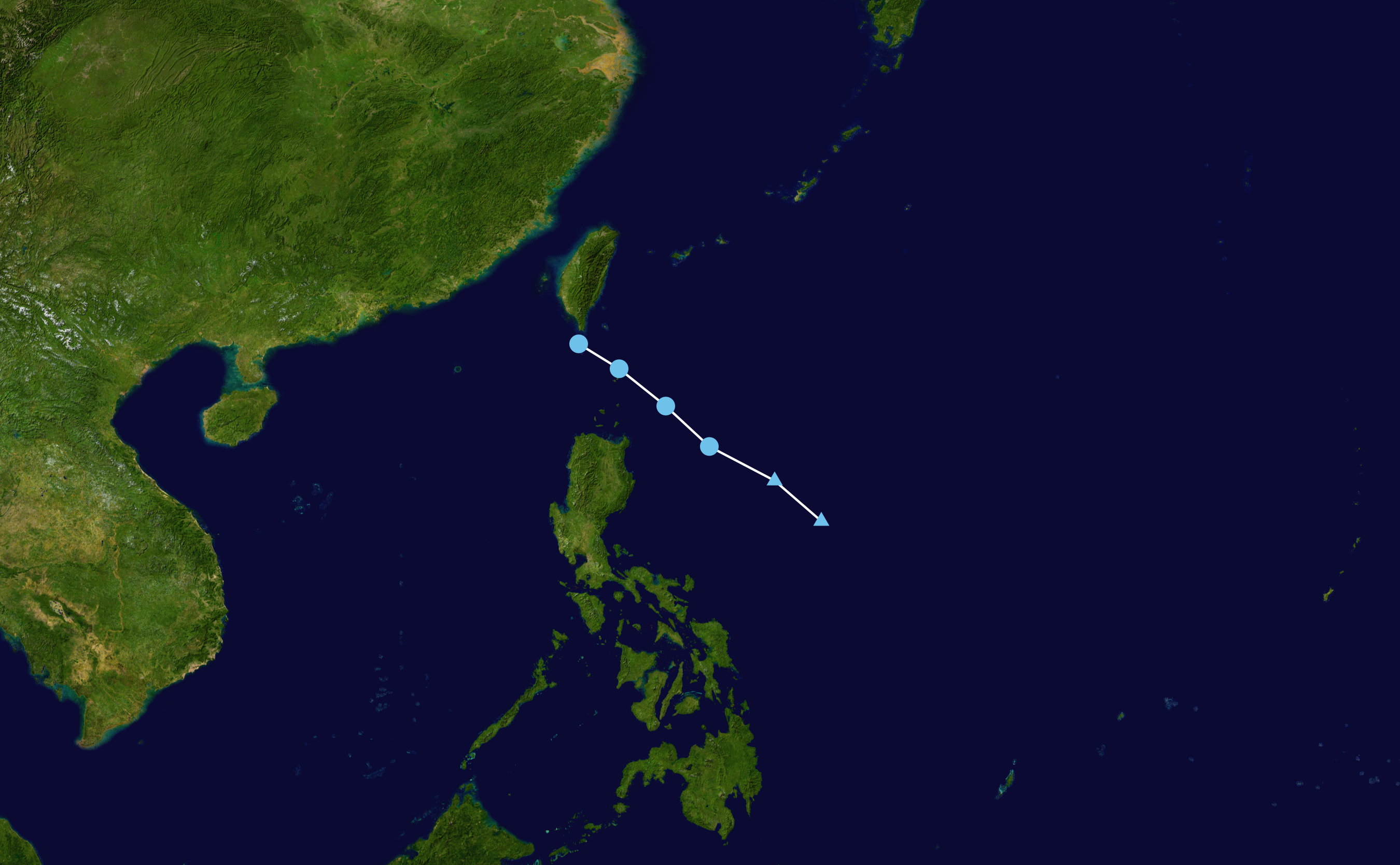
- Duration: July 3 – July 6
- Peak intensity: 55 km/h (35 mph) (10-min); 1004 hPa (mbar)

On July 2, the JTWC started to monitor a tropical disturbance to the southwest of Guam. Moving northwestwards, the disturbance was located in an environment conducive for intensification in the Philippine Sea, with warm sea surface temperatures, and low wind shear, in addition to good poleward outflow, being induced by an upper-level trough to the northwest. The JMA upgraded the broad and weak system to a tropical depression at 18:00 UTC on the next day, followed by a TCFA being issued by the JTWC an hour and a half later. The PAGASA subsequently upgraded the system to a tropical depression at 02:00 UTC on July 4, naming it Emong. At 21:00 UTC, the JTWC also upgraded the system to a tropical depression, designating it as 07W. On July 6, PAGASA issued its last advisory on Tropical Depression Emong at 03:00 UTC as it moved outside the PAR and also lift up the warnings which were imposed earlier in the wake of Emong. Meanwhile, the JMA soon followed and issued its last advisory. JTWC also issued its last advisory as its convection was significantly sheared and its low level circulation dissipated rapidly over six hours.

In the Philippines, the depression's approach required the raising of Public Storm Warning Signal No. 1 in the provinces of Batanes and the northeastern portion of Cagayan, including the Babuyan Islands, starting on July 4. The Office of Civil Defense of Cagayan were also on blue alert on the next day due to the storm, with the agency conducting a pre-disaster assessment with other government bureaus that day. The residents in the coastal areas of Palanan, Divilacan, Maconacon and Dinapigue in Isabela were also warned of the storm while fishing activities in the region were prohibited due to Emong.

=== Tropical Depression 08W ===
- Tropical depression (JMA)
- Tropical depression (SSHWS)
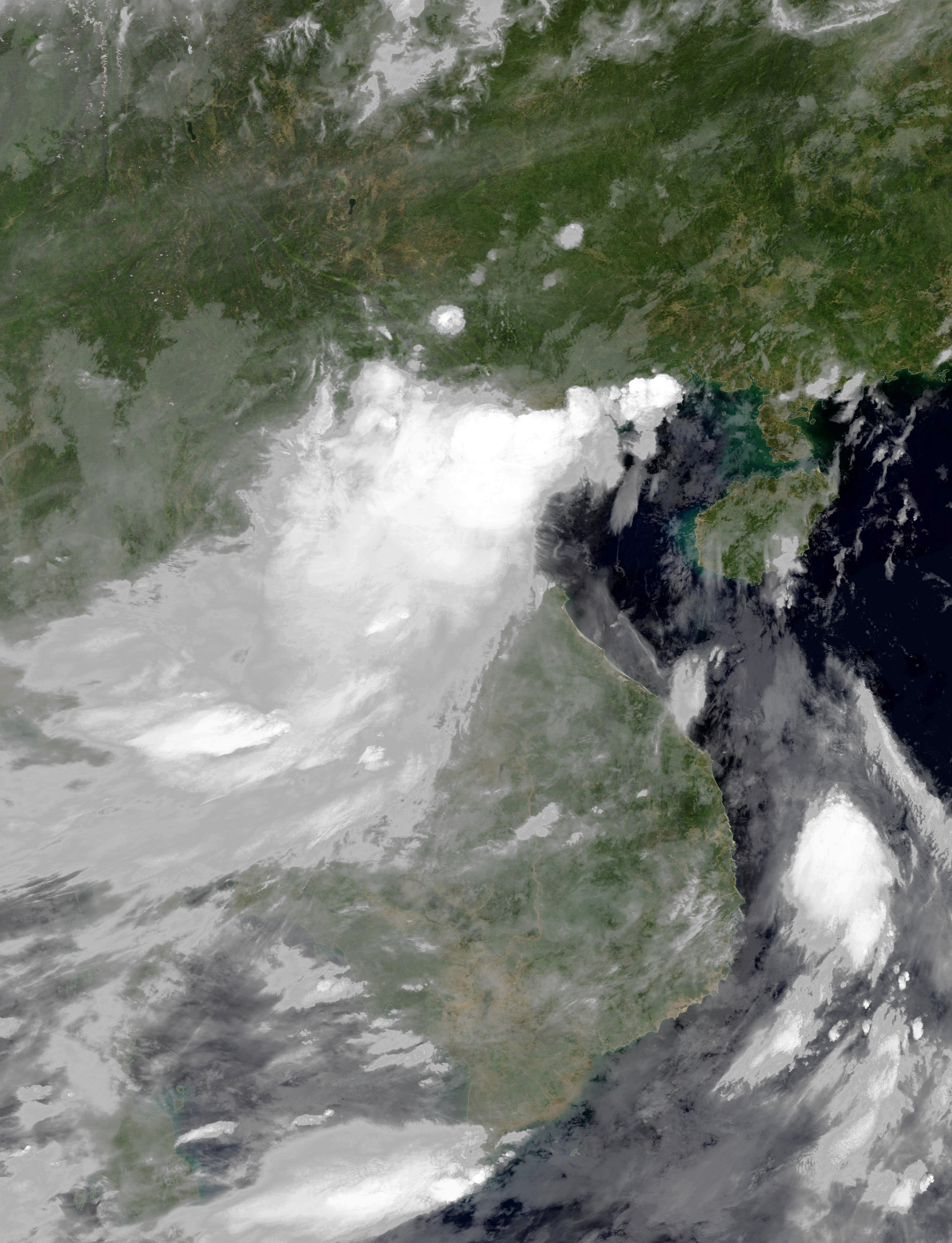
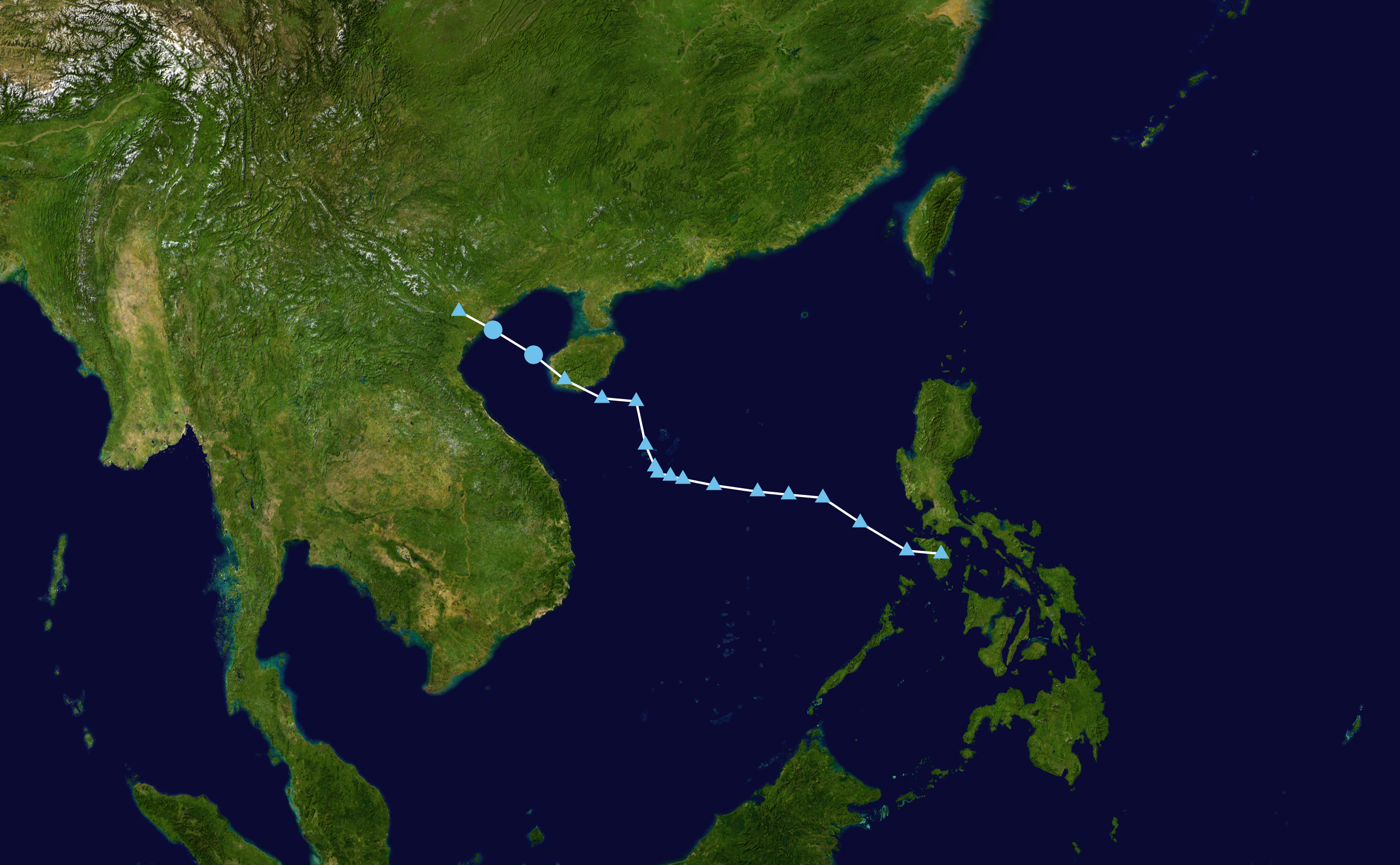
- Duration: July 5 – July 8
- Peak intensity: 55 km/h (35 mph) (10-min); 1000 hPa (mbar)

At 12:00 UTC on July 3, the PAGASA started to monitor a low-pressure area that developed near Torrijos, Marinduque or 149 kilometers to the south of Manila, followed by the Joint Typhoon Warning Center (JTWC)'s advisory at 01:00 UTC on the next day, citing the system's development as "low". In the latter's analysis on the disturbance, multispectral and microwave image scans on the system showed a weak low-level circulation center over the eastern part of Mindoro with flaring convection in the western periphery. Traveling northwestwards, the storm was located in an environment conductive for further intensification, with warm sea surface temperatures of 30–31 °C (86–88 °F), low wind shear around the region and good equatorial outflow; however, model forecasts were split regarding the disturbance's strengthening trend. Also that day at 15:00 UTC, the low-pressure area exited the Philippine Area of Responsibility (PAR), which was followed by the Japan Meteorological Agency (JMA) upgrading the storm to a tropical depression roughly three hours later. Eventually, the JTWC upgraded the system's potential intensification trend to "high" and subsequently issued a Tropical Cyclone Formation Alert at 00:30 UTC on June 6 as a circulation became well-defined. It then changed its motion towards the west along the periphery of a subtropical ridge on the north and northwest as it approached the Hainan Island. By 06:00 UTC on the next day, the disturbance moved inland on the region near Lingshui Li Autonomous County before emerging on the Gulf of Tonkin, in an area of low to moderate wind shear. Later, the disturbance began to reorganize; however, strong wind gradient suppressed its intensification, with flaring convection displaced to the west. Nine hours later, the JTWC upgraded the system to a weak tropical depression with maximum sustained winds of 45 km/h (30 mph); the JMA analysed the storm to be at 55 km/h (35 mph) and a minimum barometric pressure of 1000 hPa (29.53 inHg). By the night of that day, the depression, with the identifier 08W from the JTWC made landfall on Thanh Hoa, Vietnam on that intensity, before subsequently issuing their final warning as the agency confirmed that the system dissipated inland, with the evidences of radar and satellite imagery. The JMA continued to monitor the system until it dissipated at 00:00 UTC on July 8 over Laos.

PAGASA issued rainfall advisories on July 6 as the depression's precursor low tracked near the Philippines. The China Meteorological Administration (CMA), Hong Kong Observatory (HKO), and Macao Meteorological and Geophysical Bureau (SMG) issued tropical cyclone warnings on July 7. The warnings imposed by the HKO and SMG were later lifted at 06:10 UTC (14:10 HKT) as the system moved away from Hong Kong and Macao. As the depression approached Vietnam, the Vietnamese Ministry of Defense readied 264,272 soldiers and 1,979 vehicles for potential emergencies. Aquaculture activities were also temporarily banned. A peak rainfall total of 94 mm (3.7 in) was recorded at Sầm Sơn on July 7. Rough seas and flooding were experienced in Thanh Hóa's Hoằng Hóa District. About 7 hectares (17 acres) of rice crops and a water pipeline in Minh Luong commune, Van Ban district were both inundated and washed away by floods in Lào Cai.

=== Typhoon In-fa (Fabian) ===
- Very strong typhoon (JMA)
- Category 2 typhoon (SSHWS)
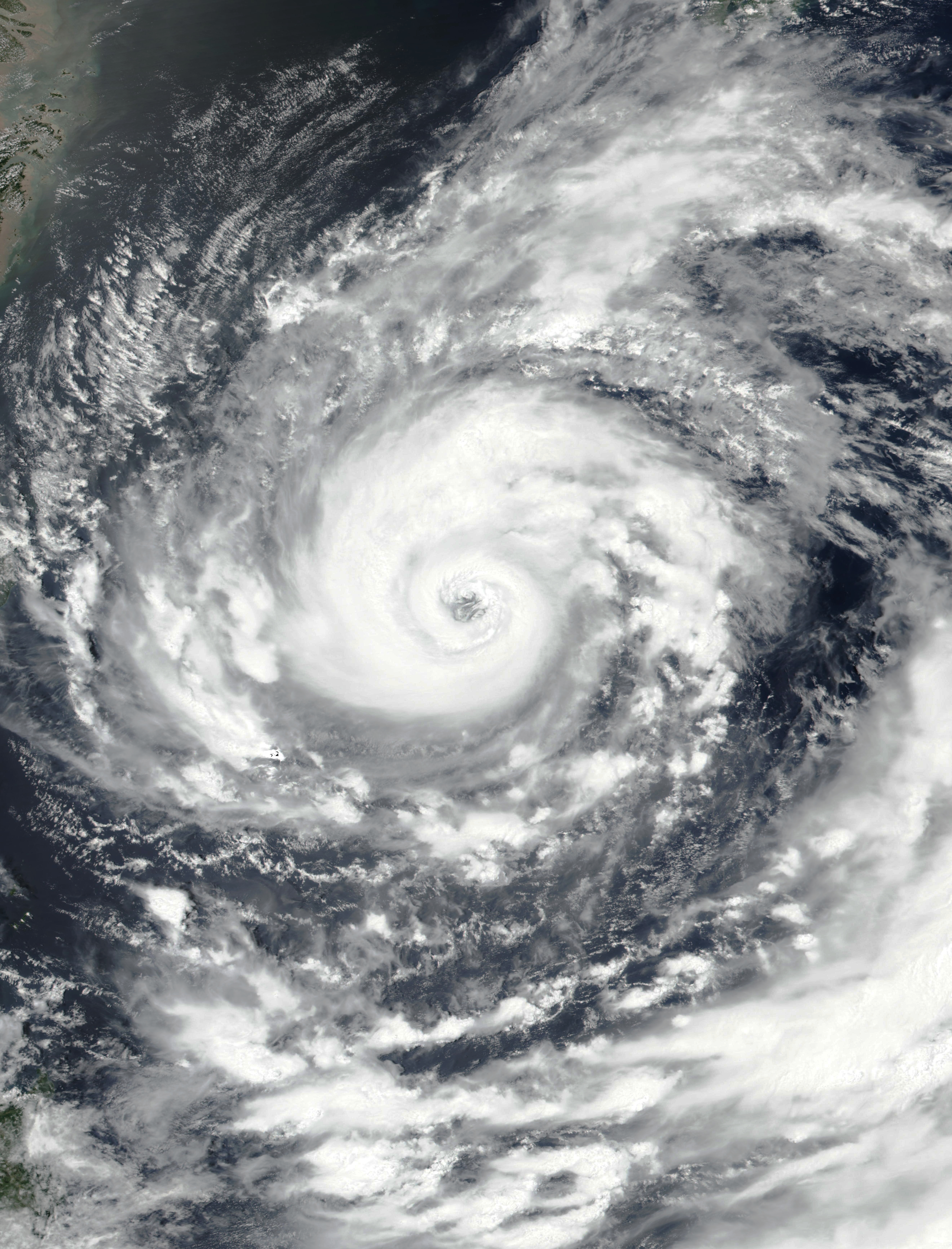
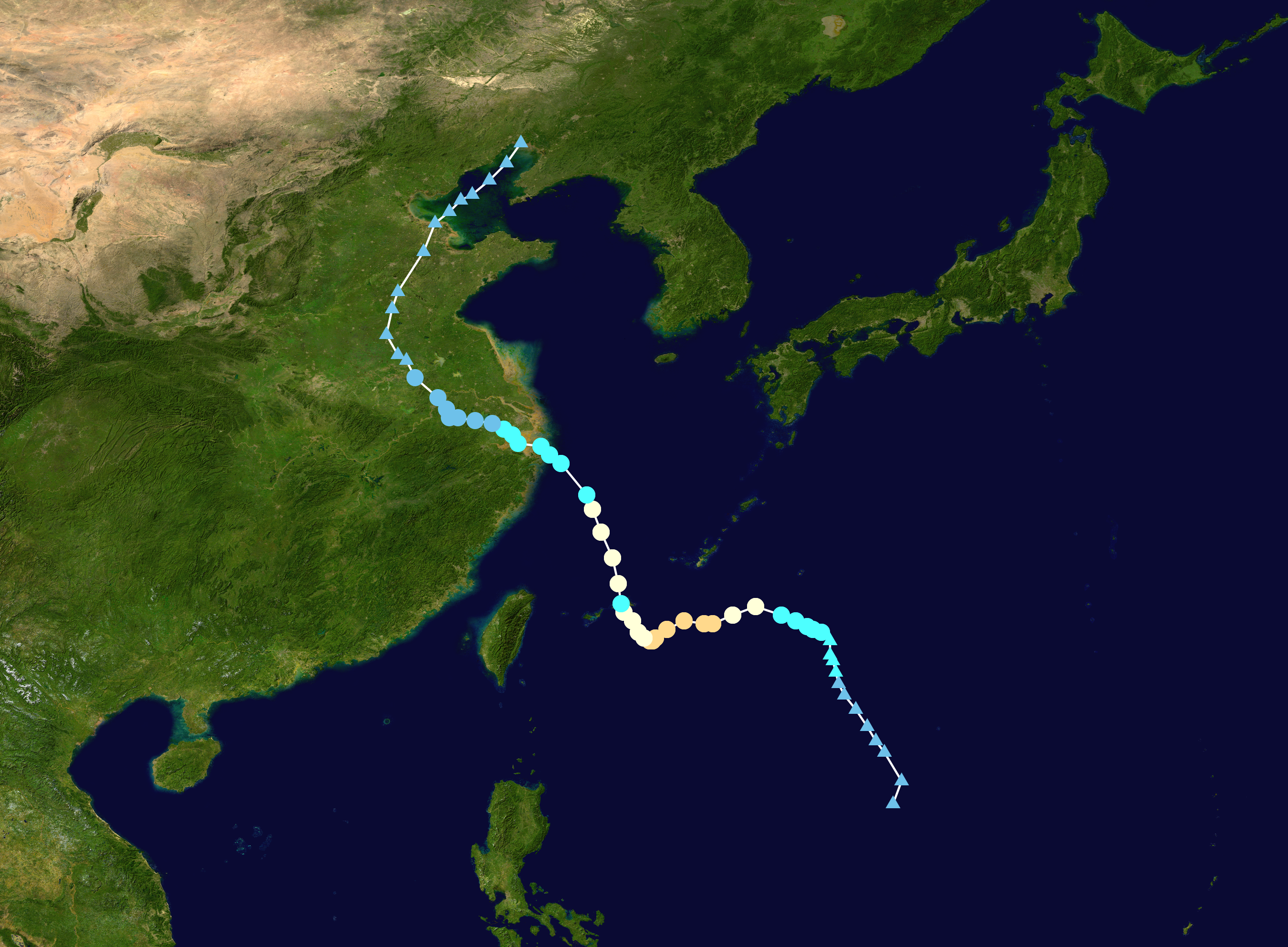
- Duration: July 15 – July 29
- Peak intensity: 155 km/h (100 mph) (10-min); 950 hPa (mbar)

At 06:00 UTC on July 14, the JTWC started to monitor an area of low pressure west-northwest of Guam. Located in an area favorable for intensification with warm sea surface temperatures as its outflow improved, the system struggled to develop under moderate wind shear before gradually intensifying, with the agency issuing a Tropical Cyclone Formation Alert at 20:30 UTC on the next day. On July 16, the PAGASA upgraded the disturbance to a tropical depression as it entered the Philippine Area of Responsibility, assigning it the local name Fabian. The JMA later recognized the system as a tropical depression at 03:00 UTC on the same day, with the JTWC doing the same at 09:00 UTC, designating it as 09W. On July 18 at 00:00 UTC, the JMA upgraded it to a tropical storm assigning it the name In-fa. The JTWC also upgraded it to a tropical storm at 03:00 UTC. The system had deep flaring convection, however its low-level circulation was broad and elongated. On July 18, at 00:00 UTC, the JMA upgraded the system to a severe tropical storm. In-fa started moving westwards, and as it gradually strengthened, In-fa developed a formative eye on July 20, at 03:00 UTC. At 09:00 UTC, the JTWC declared In-fa to have strengthened into a typhoon as it had deep convection and robust outflow. The JMA also followed suit and upgraded In-fa to a typhoon at 12:00 UTC because of good upper-level outflow and higher sea surface temperatures; however, its central dense overcast was still obscure. On the next day at 03:00 UTC, In-fa strengthened into a Category 2-equivalent typhoon as its central convection continued to deepen. The feeder bands became more compact and the eye of the typhoon became clearer and more defined. The JTWC assessed that it peaked as a Category 2-equivalent typhoon with maximum wind speeds of 175 km/h (110 mph) at 03:00 UTC the same day. Because of dry air, the JTWC later downgraded In-fa to a Category 1-equivalent typhoon at 03:00 UTC the next day despite the presence of warm sea surface temperatures and low wind shear. On July 23 at 21:00 UTC, In-fa got further downgraded to a tropical storm by the JTWC, as its eyewall became fragmented and the deep convection was not continuous over the eye; it later re-intensified into a Category 1-equivalent typhoon again at 03:00 UTC the next day as it regained convective depths and it managed to maintain a ragged eye. At 09:00 UTC, PAGASA issued its final advisory as Typhoon In-fa moved northwards and exited the PAR. On July 24, at 06:00 UTC, In-fa peaked as a typhoon with maximum 10-minute sustained wind speeds of 150 km/h (90 mph) and a minimum pressure of 950 hPa (13.78 psi), according to the JMA. On the next day, the China Meteorological Administration (CMA) noted In-fa to have made landfall in Putuo Island at around 04:30 UTC. After making landfall, the JTWC downgraded it to a tropical storm at 09:00 UTC as it eye structure began to degrade. JMA later downgraded to a severe tropical storm at 12:00 UTC, because of influence of land and involvement of dry air.

=== Typhoon Cempaka ===
- Typhoon (JMA)
- Category 1 typhoon (SSHWS)
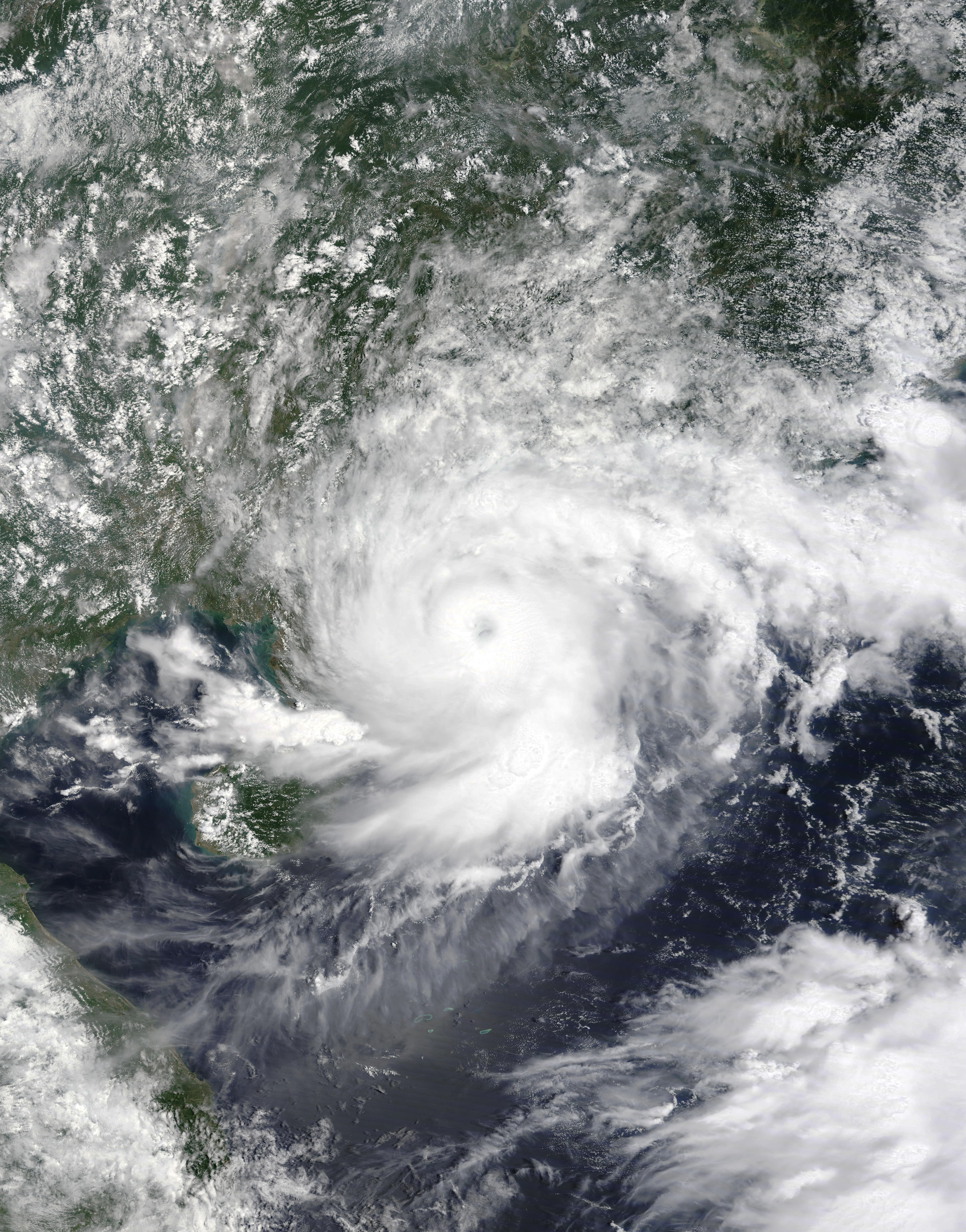
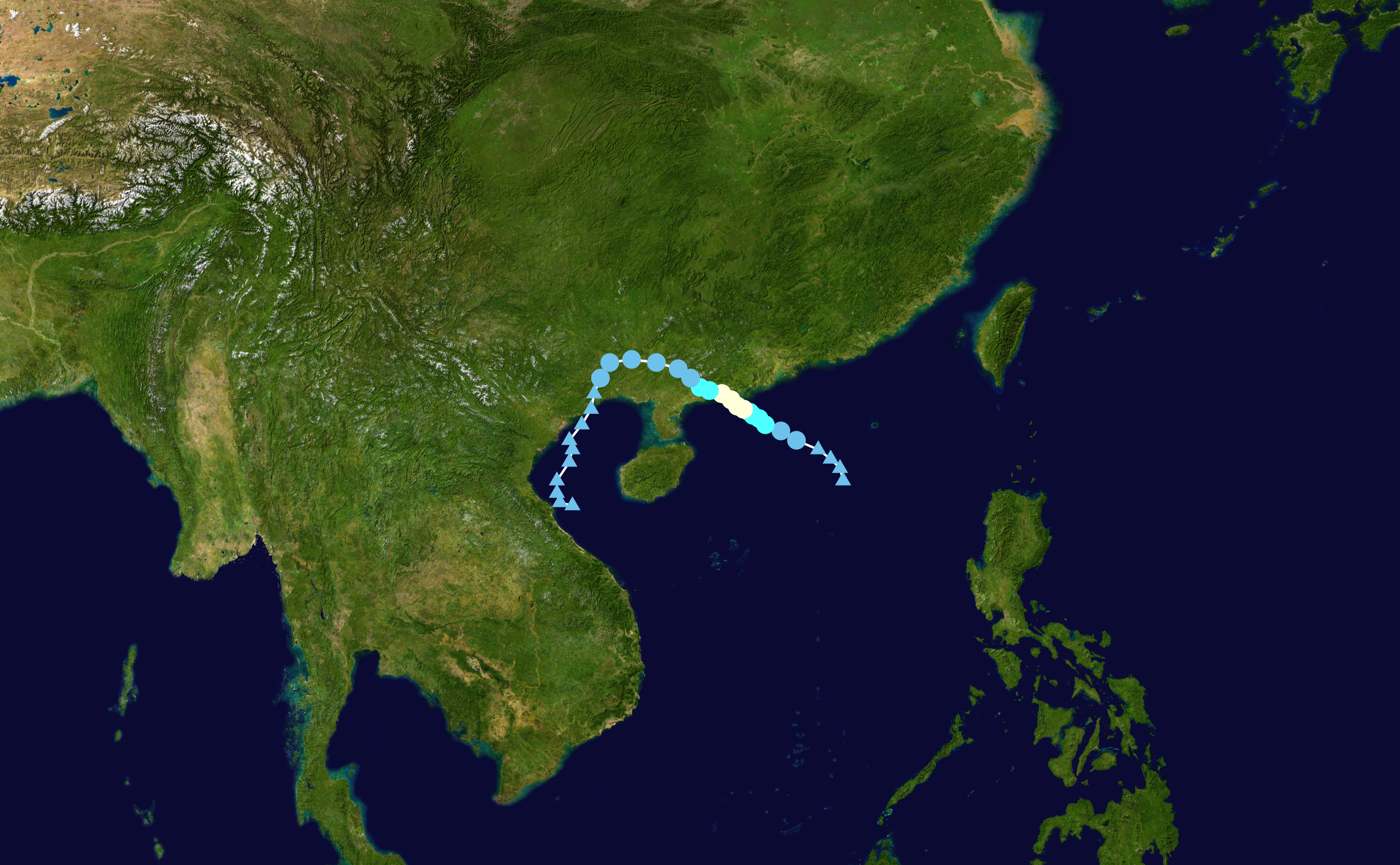
- Duration: July 17 – July 25
- Peak intensity: 130 km/h (80 mph) (10-min); 980 hPa (mbar)

On July 17, the JMA reported that a tropical depression had formed. The JTWC later issued a TCFA for the system, as the aforementioned area of convection became more organized. By the following day, the JTWC upgraded the system to a tropical depression and designated it as 10W, with the storm possessing an improved convective structure and a defined low-level circulation. The JTWC upgraded the system to a tropical storm at 21:00 UTC as it had a defined low-level circulation center with improved banding structure. At 00:00 UTC on July 19, the JMA upgraded the system to a tropical storm, assigning it the name Cempaka. At 21:00 UTC, the JTWC declared Cempaka to have strengthened into a Category 1-equivalent typhoon as it developed a ragged 15 nmi (28 km; 17 mi) wide eye. The JMA later upgraded it to a severe tropical storm at 00:00 UTC on the next day. On July 20, at 06:00 UTC, Cempaka peaked as a severe tropical storm with 10-sustained maximum wind speed of 55 kn (100 km/h; 65 mph) with minimum pressure of 990 hPa (29.23 inHg), according to JMA. JTWC assessed that it peaked as a typhoon with maximum 1-minute sustained wind of 80 kn (150 km/h; 90 mph). Cempaka made landfall near Jiangcheng District, Yangjiang, Guangdong Province, and the JTWC downgraded it to a tropical storm at 18:00 UTC the same day as its low-level circulation center became obscure. The JMA also downgraded Cempaka to a tropical storm at 00:00 UTC the next day as it moved further inland and its central dense overcast disappeared. At 09:00 UTC, the JTWC further downgraded Cempaka to a tropical depression as its deep convection declined; however, it still retained a well-defined wind field. After moving inland, Cempaka started moving westward at 00:00 UTC on July 21 due to weak steering flow. Remaining inland, Cempaka maintained tropical storm intensity as it continued westward, but due to unfavorable conditions over land, it weakened into a tropical depression on the next day at 00:00 UTC. On July 22, at 09:00 UTC, Cempaka then moved southwards towards the Gulf of Tonkin because of the influence of the monsoonal westerlies, while maintaining its tropical depression intensity inland. Cempaka moved southward, crossed Móng Cái, Quảng Ninh Province in Vietnam and later entered the Gulf of Tonkin at 03:00 UTC. However, Cempaka further weakened despite the presence of warm sea surface temperatures because of high monsoonal wind shear and land interaction. At 15:00 UTC, the JTWC issued its final warning on the system as it became a weakly defined system with an exposed low-level circulation center over Bạch Long Vĩ Island. On July 26 at 00:00 UTC, the JMA issued its last advisory.

In preparation for the tropical depression, the HKO issued a Signal No. 1 warning for Hong Kong at 13:40 UTC on July 18, which was later upgraded to a Signal No. 3 warning as Cempaka neared the Pearl River Delta. However, as it moved away from Hong Kong, the HKO downgraded it to a Signal No. 1 warning, which was later cancelled at 11:40 UTC. The CMA issued an orange alert for the southern provinces of China as Cempaka moved closer to Guangdong, China, though it was later downgraded to a blue alert as it entered mainland China. It was later lifted by the CMA, as the threat of Cempaka was minimal. As Cempaka made landfall in Guangdong, there were reports of heavy rainfall and rough waves in the region. Over 990 flights were cancelled in Guangzhou, Shenzhen and Zhuhai. The influence of Cempaka caused heavy rainfall in Henan Province, along with In-fa causing devastating floods in the region.

The JMA later upgraded Cempaka's intensity from Severe Tropical Storm to Typhoon in the post analysis.

=== Tropical Storm Nepartak ===
- Tropical storm (JMA)
- Subtropical storm (SSHWS)
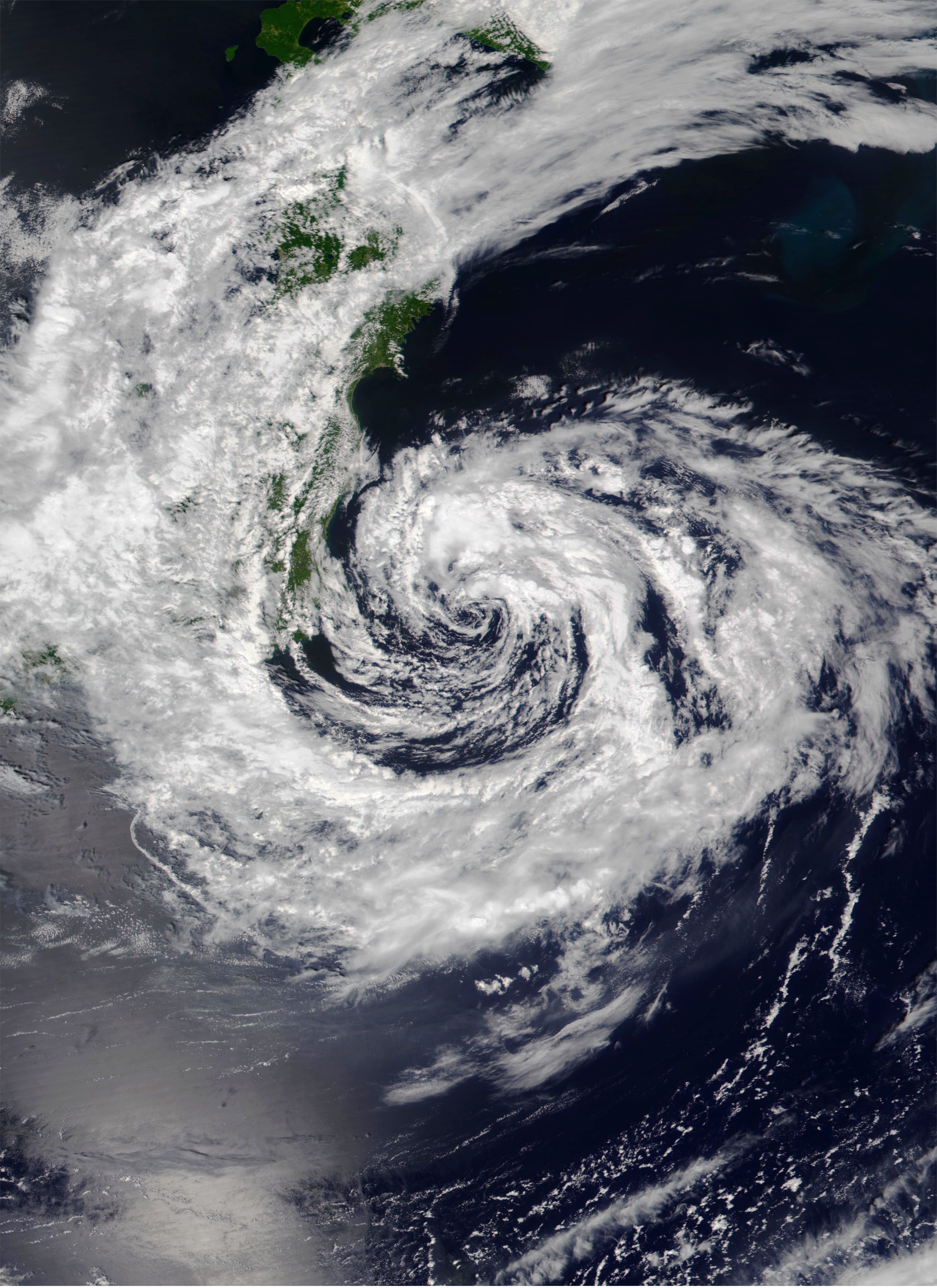
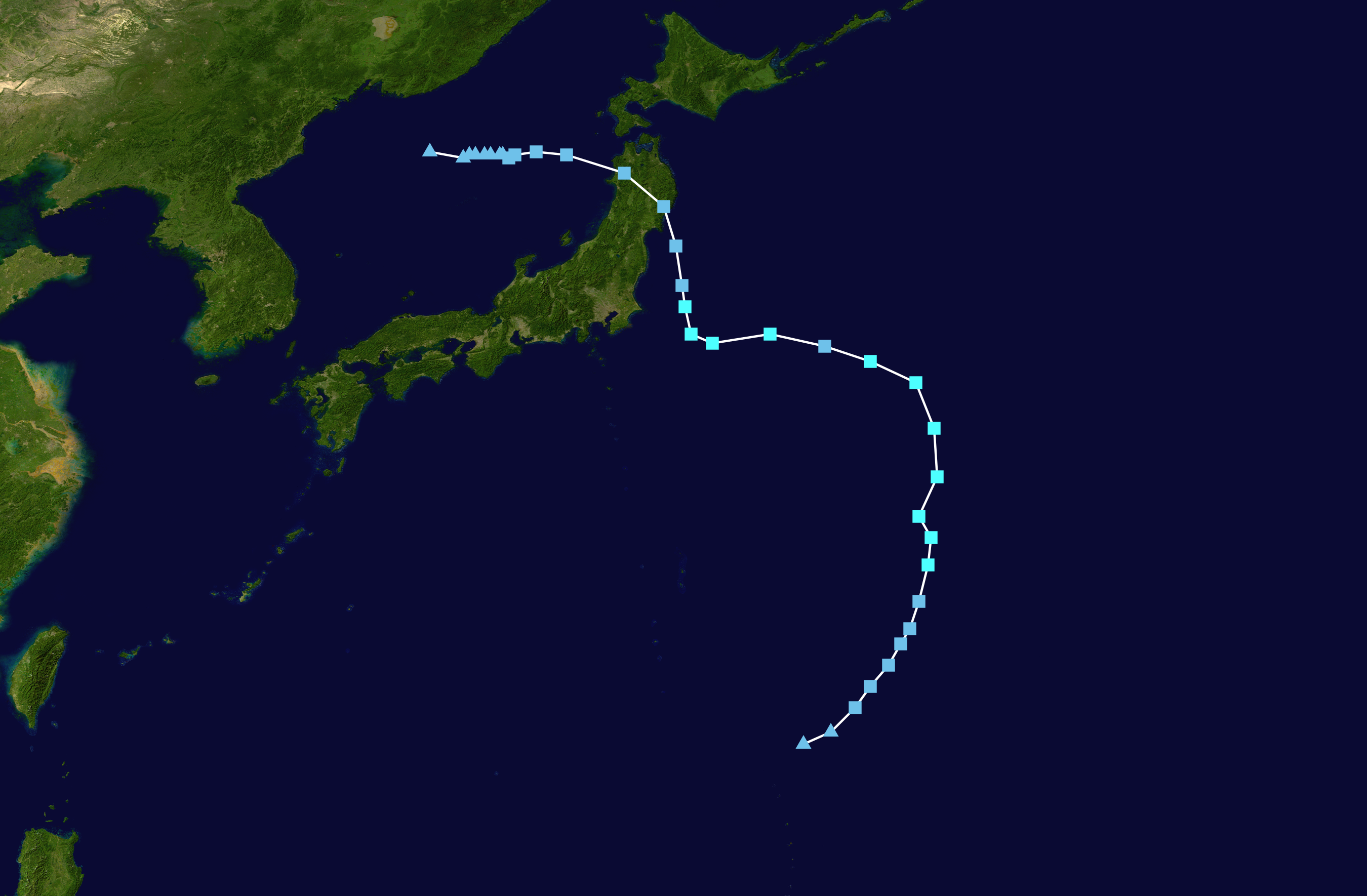
- Duration: July 22 – July 28
- Peak intensity: 75 km/h (45 mph) (10-min); 990 hPa (mbar)

At 06:00 UTC on July 22, the Joint Typhoon Warning Center (JTWC) started to monitor a tropical disturbance with subtropical features along the eastern portion of a monsoon trough, located approximately 466 nmi (865 km; 535 mi) to the north of Guam. A weak system, multispectral satellite imageries revealed that the disturbance was disorganized along the said trough, while advanced scaterrometer data showed the same feature with southerly convergent flow over the northern Mariana Islands. Environmental analysis depicted an unfavorable amount of wind shear, although the agency noted that the disturbance could form as a subtropical cyclone along the subtropical trough with the help of baroclinity. Tracking northeastward, the system slowly organized, with a low-level circulation center developing seen on meteorological satellite imageries. The Japan Meteorological Agency (JMA) designated the disturbance as a tropical depression, seventeen hours later while the JTWC upgraded the system's potential intensification trend from "medium" to "high" and subsequently issued a Tropical Cyclone Formation Alert (TCFA) on the storm at 22:30 UTC that day. At 12:00 UTC, Dvorak intensity observations and surface wind data from satellite scatterometer confirmed that the depression further intensified to the eighth tropical storm of the season, whereupon the JMA named it as Nepartak. The JTWC, however only issued its first warning on Nepartak as Tropical Depression 11W, three hours later as its LLCC further became broad and exposed with its center remaining weakly defined while being steered on the continued direction by a north–south oriented subtropical ridge. Nine hours later, the agency further upgraded the system to a subtropical storm as vigorous deep convection further became constant on the east of the still-exposed and elongated circulation center. By July 24, Nepartak was guided north-northeastwards by an upper-level low and a trough. Baroclinic interaction with the latter also led to the development of a large and asymmetric wind field, with the maximum sustained winds of 35 kn (40 mph; 65 km/h) being far from the center. Later, the system's core became ragged as it turned northwards and further northeast before shifting north again while remaining at that intensity. At 09:00 UTC of the next day, the JTWC noted two distinct vorticities, being spaced 350 nmi (650 km; 405 mi) to each other, with each having an elongated circulation from the south-southwest to the north-northeast.

The intensity of Nepartak remained at 65 km/h (40 mph) until 15:00 UTC on July 26, when the system slightly intensified to 40 kn (45 mph; 75 km/h) as it underwent a rapid structural evolution while moving west-northwestwards. At that time, the storm was now almost centered underneath an upper-level low, in which it interacted with for several days prior. Nepartak also began to accelerated as it moved poleward, while subsequently reaching its peak intensity 12 hours later, with winds of 45 kn (50 mph; 85 km/h) and a minimum barometric pressure of 990 hPa (14.36 psi). As it turned towards the north, the system started to approach the Tōhoku region, and its circulation center became well-defined while located under the cold-core low, which was causing dry air intrusions within the cyclone. The system began to weaken to a low-end tropical storm before making landfall near the town of Minamisanriku in Miyagi Prefecture at 23:00 UTC as a subtropical depression. As it rapidly crossed far western Honshu, its LLC became disorganized and ragged, with its convective signature collapsing as it crossed the Japanese Alps. At 15:00 UTC on July 28, the JTWC issued its final warning and bulletin on the system as it emerged over the Sea of Japan. Meanwhile, the JMA continued to monitor the remaining remnants on the area until it dissipated at 12:00 UTC on July 31.

The system was the first tropical cyclone to make landfall in any part of Miyagi Prefecture since reliable records began in 1951. As Nepartak was anticipated to bring bad weather in the midst of the 2020 Summer Olympics, the rowing competitions were rescheduled.

=== Tropical Depression 12W ===
- Tropical depression (JMA)
- Tropical storm (SSHWS)
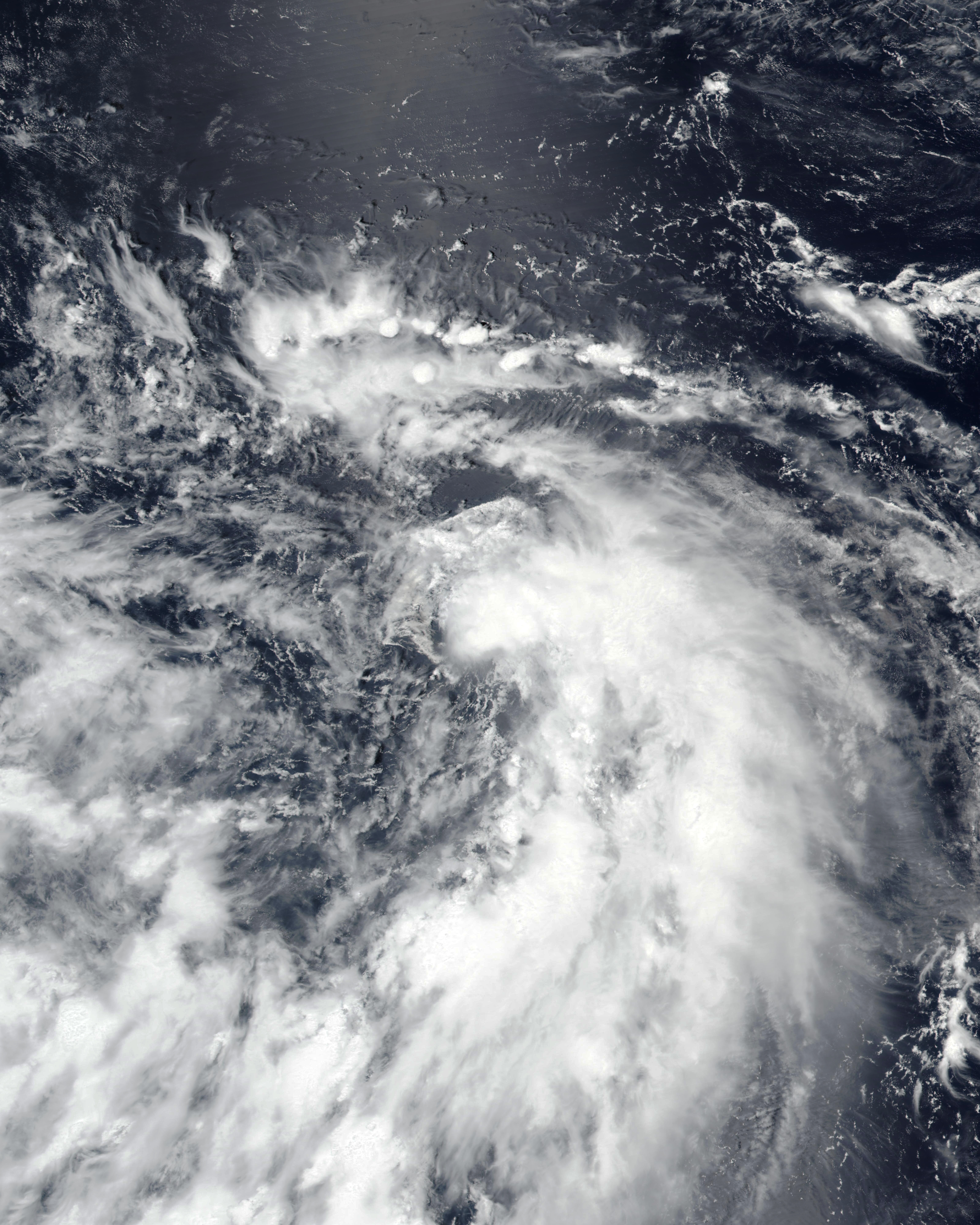
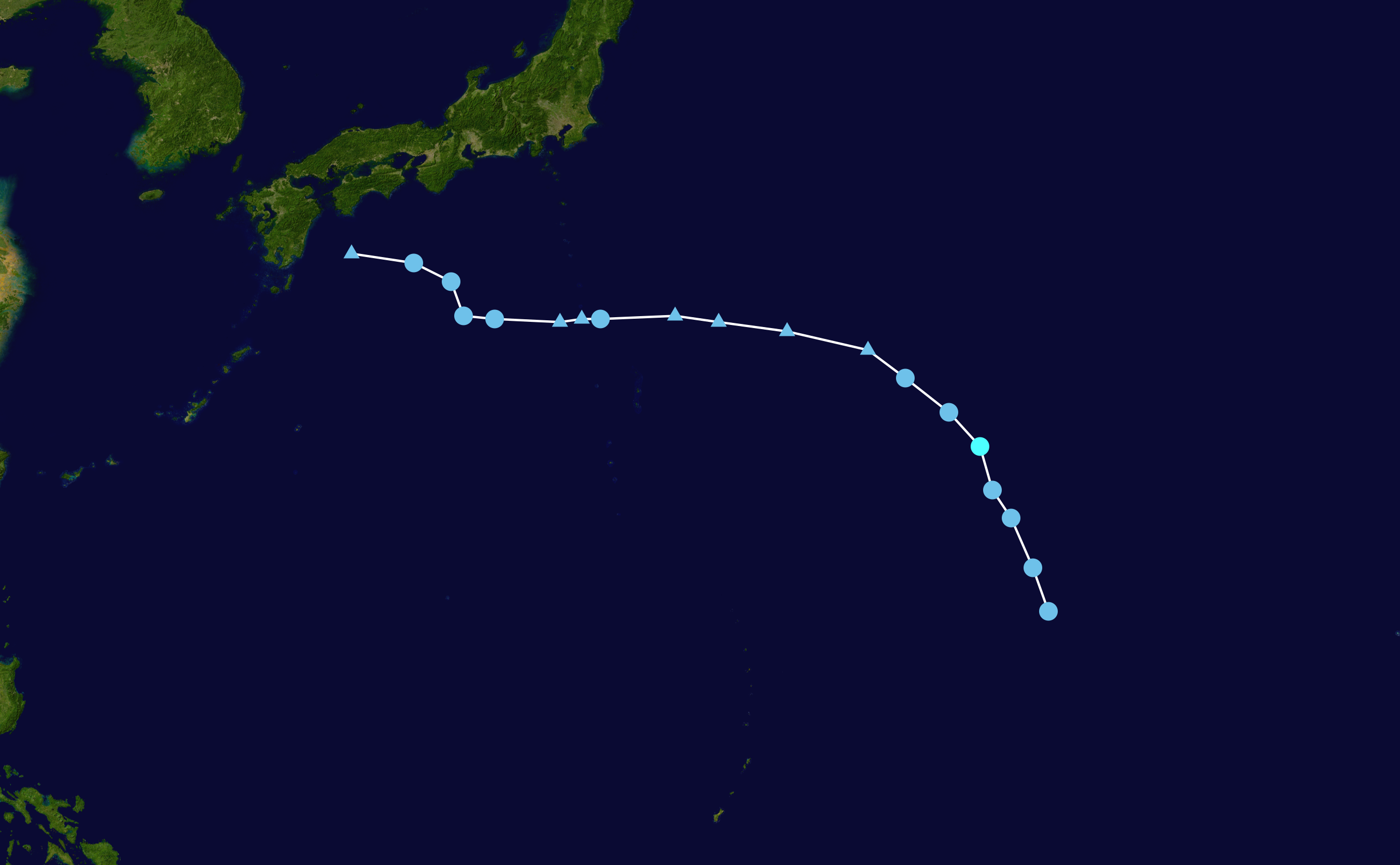
- Duration: August 2 – August 6
- Peak intensity: 55 km/h (35 mph) (10-min); 1000 hPa (mbar)

On August 1, the JTWC issued a TCFA for a disturbance in the open western Pacific as it had an ill-defined low-level circulation center and deep convection. On the next day, at 00:00 UTC, the JMA recognized it as a tropical depression as it was located near Minami-Tori-shima. It was moving northwards at 10 kn (19 km/h; 12 mph). A few hours later, the JTWC upgraded the system to a tropical depression, giving it the designation 12W. At that time, the LLC of the storm remained exposed and its strongest convection or thunderstorms were displaced to the west. A deep-layered subtropical ridge to the east guided the depression to move to the north-northwest while being near from a monsoon gyre. Despite being located in a favorable environment for additional strengthening, another system to the south slowly interacted with the depression, which weakened the storm's intensity. It reached its peak intensity that day, with winds of 55 km/h (35 mph) in the estimates of the JMA and the JTWC. By August 3, the JTWC downgraded 12W to a disturbance as its structure deteriorated; the agency upgraded it back to a tropical depression a day later. The system's LLC then became fully exposed, and on August 6, both the JTWC and the JMA assessed that 12W had dissipated.

=== Tropical Storm Lupit (Huaning) ===
- Tropical storm (JMA)
- Tropical storm (SSHWS)
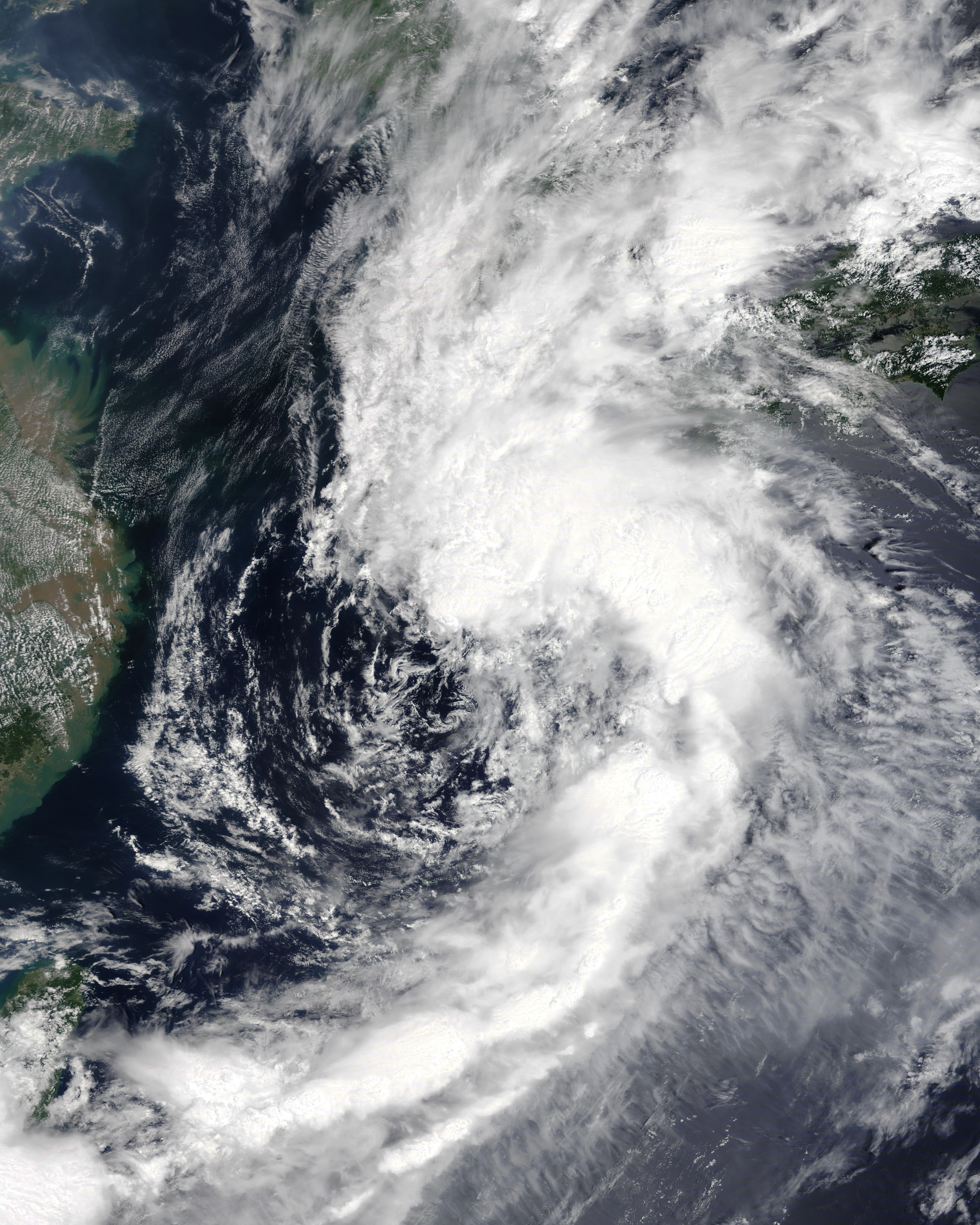
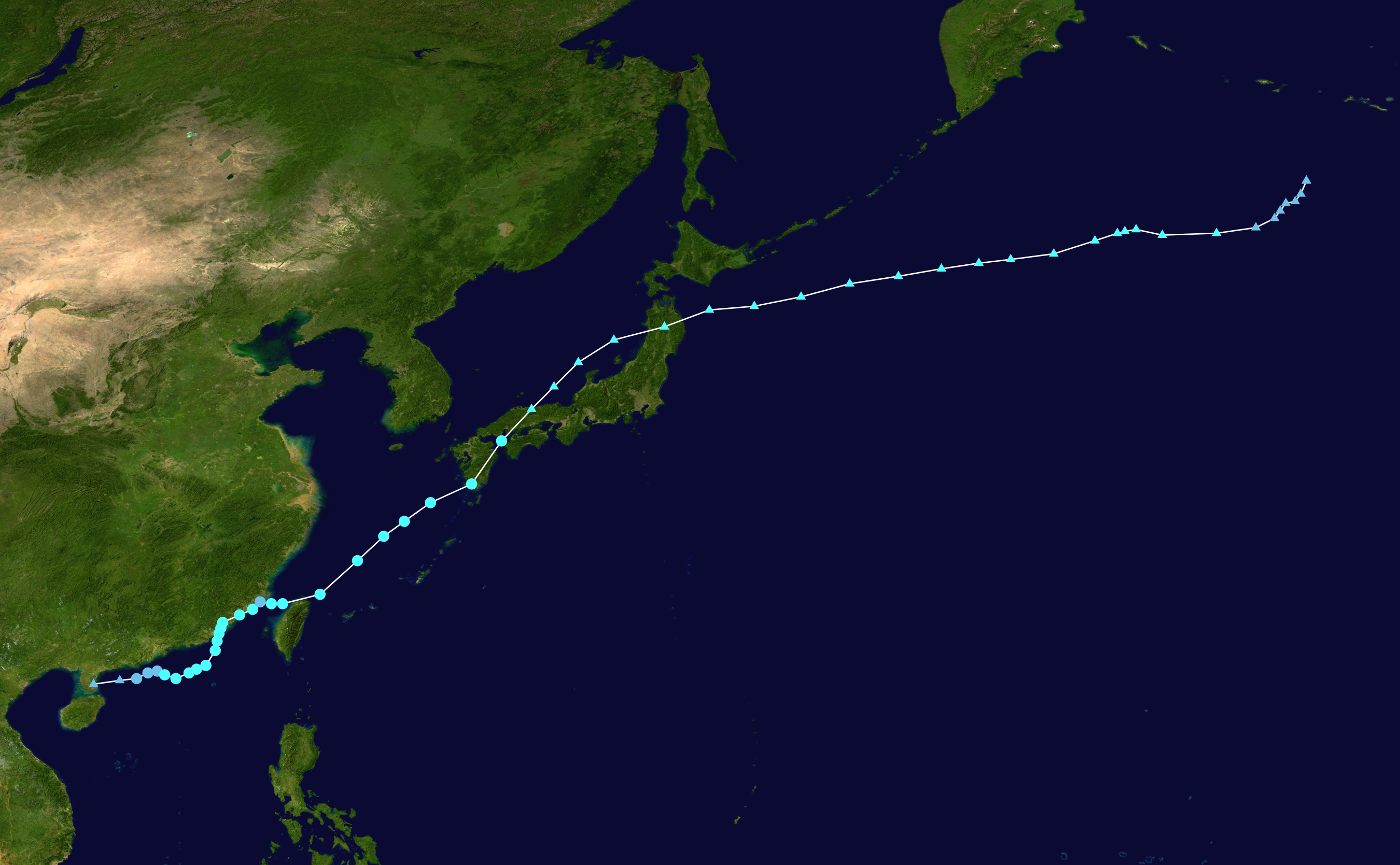
- Duration: August 2 – August 9
- Peak intensity: 85 km/h (50 mph) (10-min); 984 hPa (mbar)

On August 2, the JMA noted a tropical depression near Zhanjiang had formed. Soon afterwards, the JTWC issued a TCFA on the disturbance situated approximately 153 nm west-southwest of Hong Kong. On the same day at 21:00 UTC, the JTWC assessed the system as a tropical depression and accordingly designated it as 13W. Twenty-four hours later, the agency upgraded the system to a tropical storm. On August 4 at 12:00 UTC, the JMA followed suit and designated the system as a tropical storm, assigning it the name Lupit. A day later at 03:20 UTC, it made landfall over Nan'ao County in Shantou, Guangdong Province. At 08:50 UTC, it made another landfall over Dongshan County in Zhangzhou, Fujian Province. On August 7, it headed eastward and briefly entered the PAR, and was named Huaning by PAGASA. On August 8, at 18:00 UTC, Lupit peaked as a tropical storm with maximum 10-minute sustained winds of 45 kn (85 km/h; 50 mph) and minimum pressure of 985 mb (29.09 inHg). Maximum 1-minute sustained speed of Lupit was 45 kn (85 km/h; 50 mph). On August 9, at 00:00 UTC, the JMA issued its final warning, as it completed its extratropical transition. At 21:00 UTC, the JTWC followed and issued its final warning.

Four were reported dead and one were missing due to Lupit in Taiwan; two drowned in Ren'ai, Nantou when they were washed away by a stream on August 6, one when a teenager fell into the Zengwen Reservoir on August 11 while getting a phone that he dropped on the area; his body were recovered on the next day by the authorities. A man whose jogging in Anping Harbor was killed as he was smashed by a large wave into a seawall in the said area on August 7, while his two friends were injured.

=== Severe Tropical Storm Mirinae (Gorio) ===
- Severe tropical storm (JMA)
- Tropical storm (SSHWS)
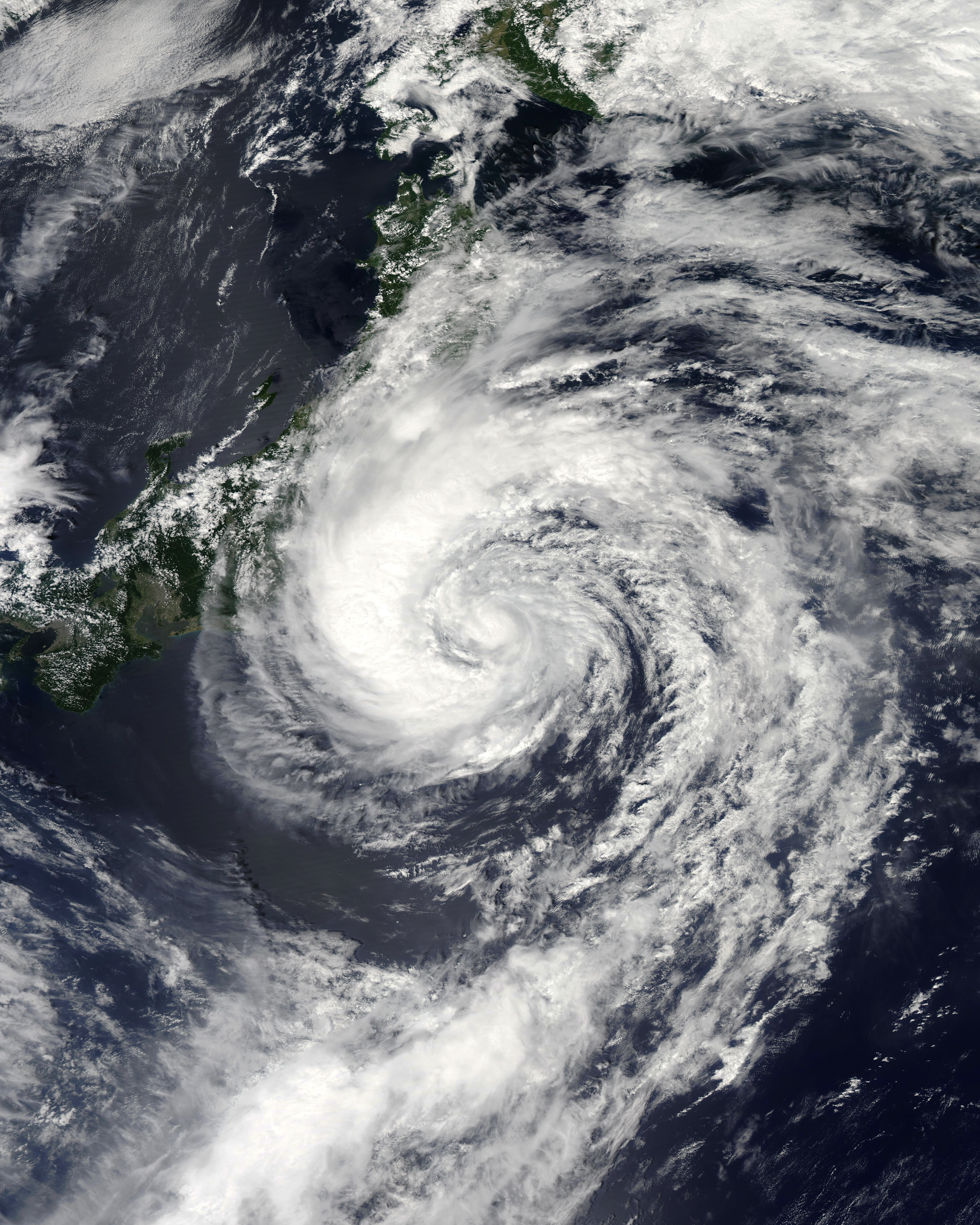
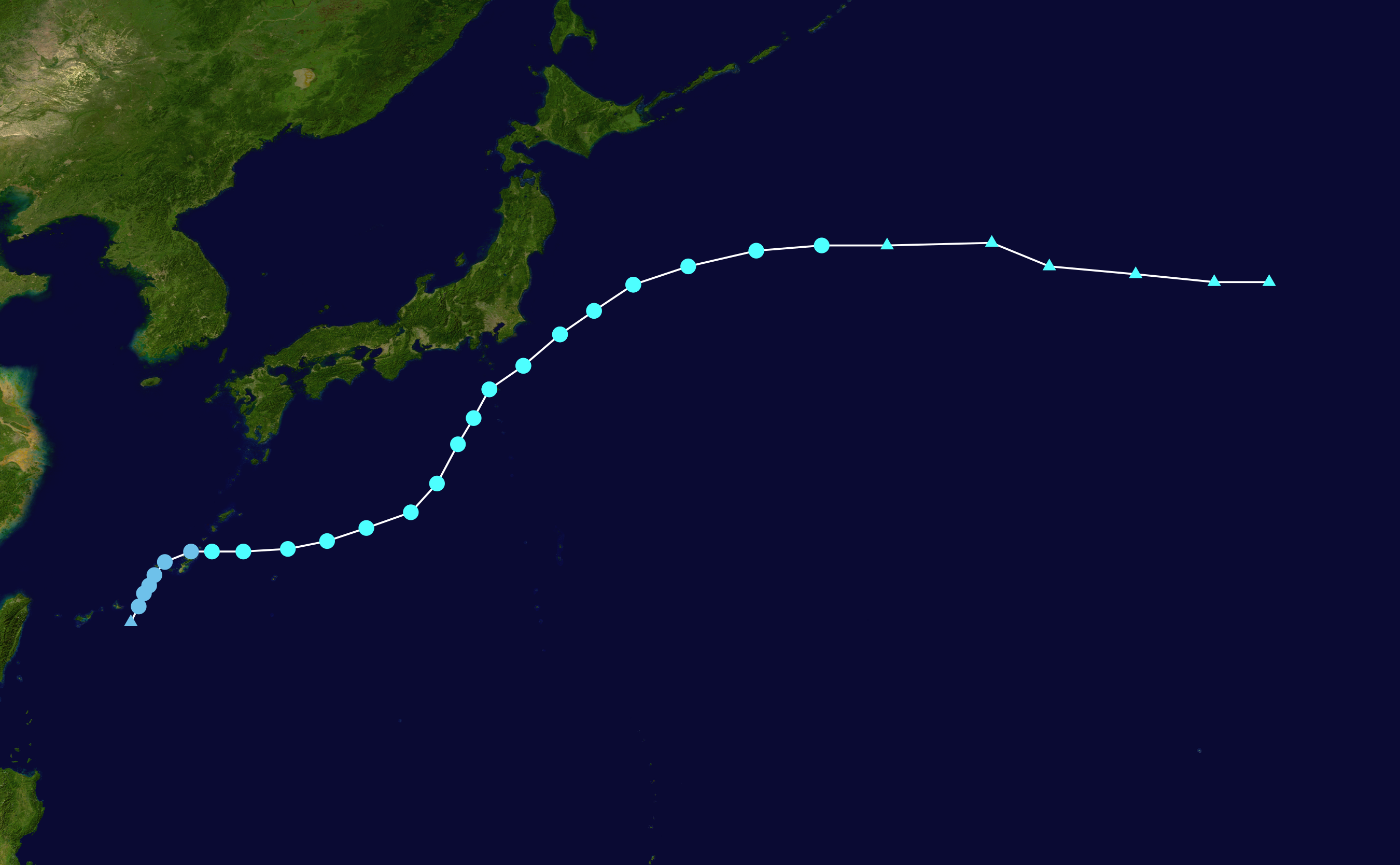
- Duration: August 3 – August 10
- Peak intensity: 95 km/h (60 mph) (10-min); 980 hPa (mbar)

On August 3, at 18:00 UTC, the JMA issued a tropical cyclone advisory for a tropical depression which was located off the east coast of Taiwan and north of the Philippines. The JMA later issued its first prognostic reasoning at the same time, stating that clusters of convective bursts were scattered around the low-level circulation. At 22:00 UTC, the same day, the JTWC issued a TCFA for the system, as it had a consolidating low-level circulation, and it was located in a very conductive environment with high sea surface temperatures and low to moderate vertical wind shear. On the next day, at 03:00 UTC, the PAGASA recognized it as a tropical depression and named it Gorio, as it was located inside the PAR. At 06:00 UTC, the JTWC did the same and designated it as 14W, as satellite imagery showed a fully exposed mesovortex. On August 5, at 06:00 UTC, the JMA upgraded it to a tropical storm, naming it as Mirinae. Clusters of convective bursts were gathering around the center with a curved manner, with Mirinae having distinct anticyclonic outflow. At 15:00 UTC, the JTWC followed and upgraded it to a tropical storm, as the storm developed a partially exposed low-level circulation center. Flaring convection was present, though it was affected by moderate westerly wind shear. On August 7, at 18:00 UTC, Mirinae peaked as a tropical storm with maximum 10-sustained wind speed of 50 kn (95 km/h; 60 mph) and minimum barometric pressure of 980 mb (28.94 inHg). Maximum 1-minute sustained wind speed of Mirinae was 55 kn (100 km/h; 65 mph). On August 9, at 09:00 UTC, the JTWC issued its final warning for the system. The JMA later issued its last warning on the next day at 00:00 UTC, as it became an extratropical cyclone.

=== Severe Tropical Storm Nida ===
- Severe tropical storm (JMA)
- Tropical storm (SSHWS)
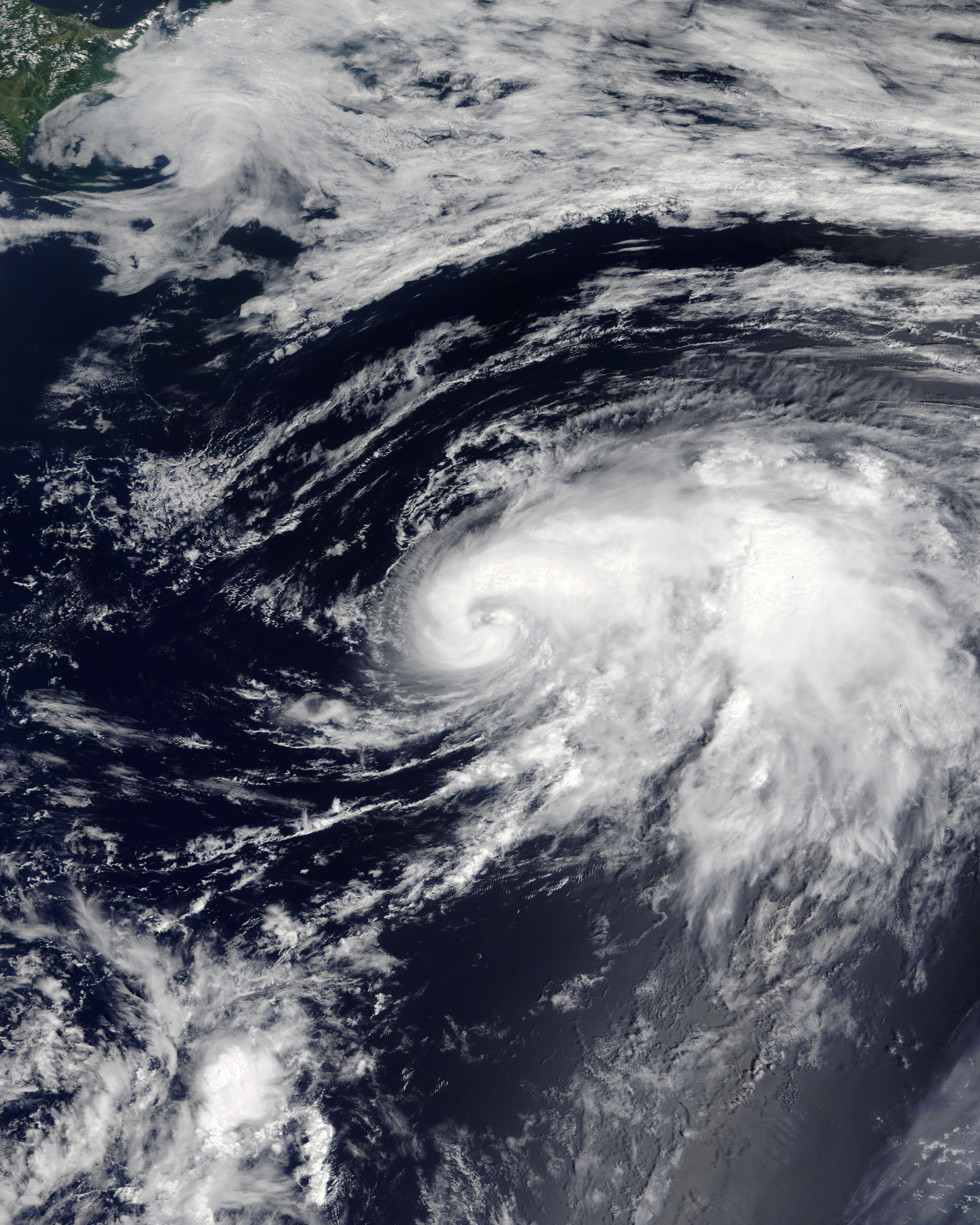
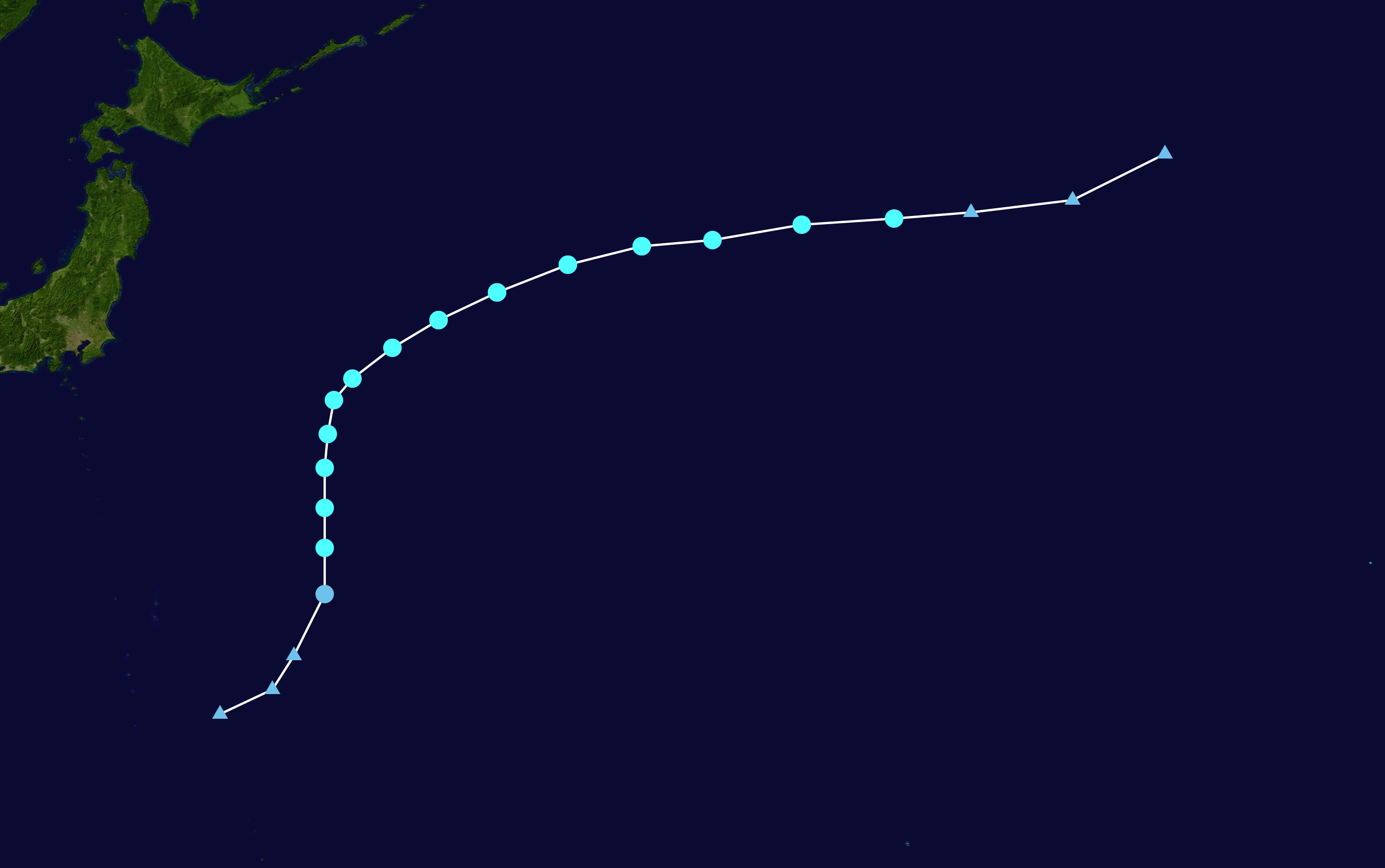
- Duration: August 3 – August 8
- Peak intensity: 100 km/h (65 mph) (10-min); 992 hPa (mbar)

On August 3, at 06:00 UTC, the JMA noted a tropical depression north of the Mariana Islands which was moving northwards at 10 kn (19 km/h; 12 mph). At 03:00 UTC, the next day, the JTWC issued a TCFA for the system. By that time, it had developed a partially obscured low-level circulation center. At 15:00 UTC, the JTWC recognized it as a tropical depression, designating it as 15W. On August 5, 03:00 UTC, the JTWC upgraded it to a tropical storm, as its low-level circulation center became more defined. Three hours later, the JMA followed and named it Nida. Satellite imagery showed that convective bursts were organized into a curved band and that the system was exhibiting good anticyclone outflow. On August 6, at 18:00 UTC, the JMA upgraded it to a severe tropical storm, as it had distinct anticyclonic outflow. Nida then started moving eastwards at 6:00 UTC the next day, because of a mid-level subtropical high-pressure area along with the westerlies. On August 7, at 09:00 UTC, the JTWC issued the last advisory for the system, as its low-level circulation center was partly exposed due to the westerlies inflicting shear upon the storm. However, the JMA continued to publish bulletins for the system. Nida continued its trajectory. On August 7, 12:00 UTC, the JMA downgraded it to a tropical storm due to shear and a generally less conductive environment. The JMA further downgraded it to an extratropical low at 00:00 UTC the next day as it completed its extratropical transition.

=== Tropical Storm Omais (Isang) ===
- Tropical storm (JMA)
- Tropical storm (SSHWS)
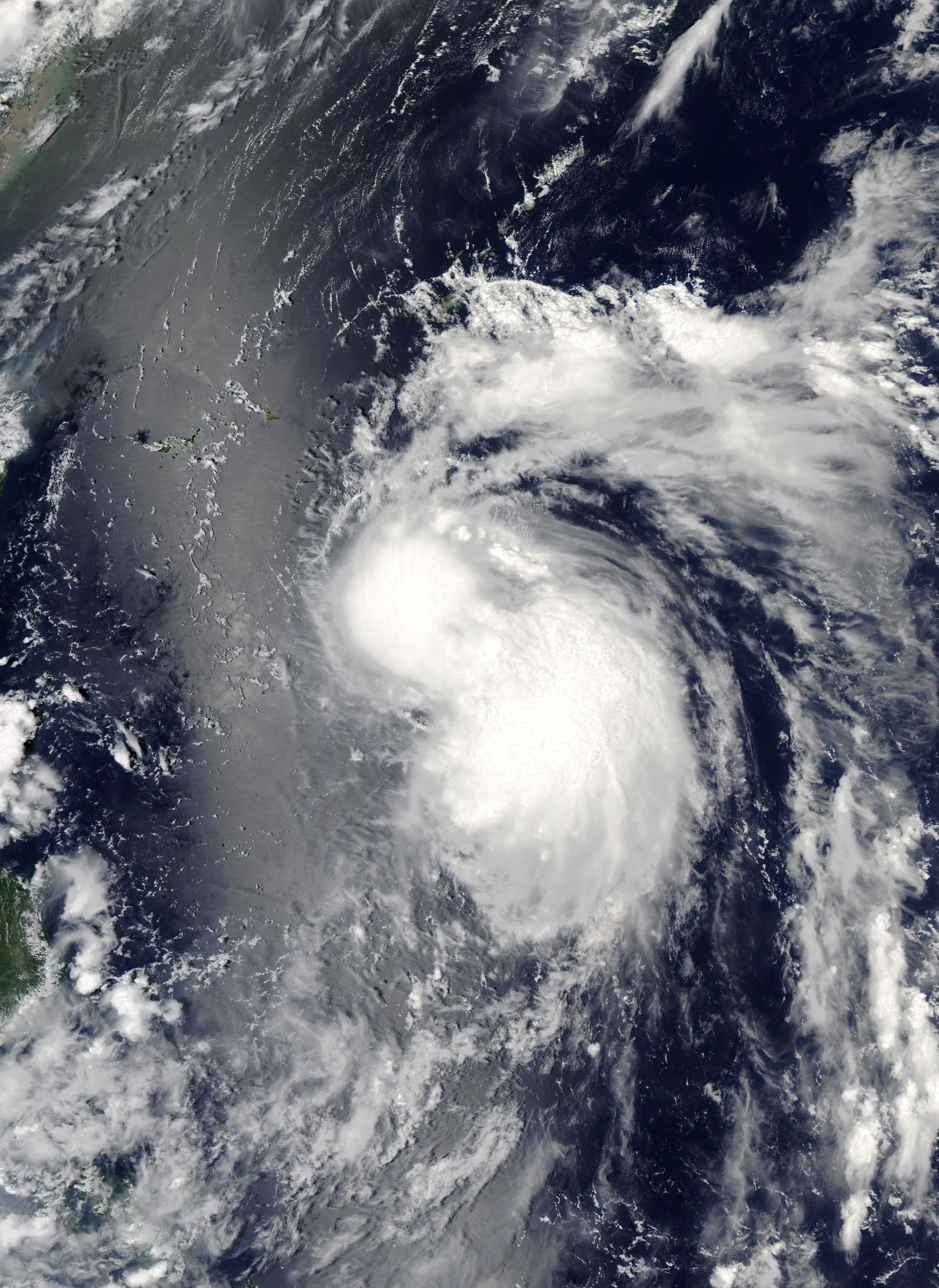
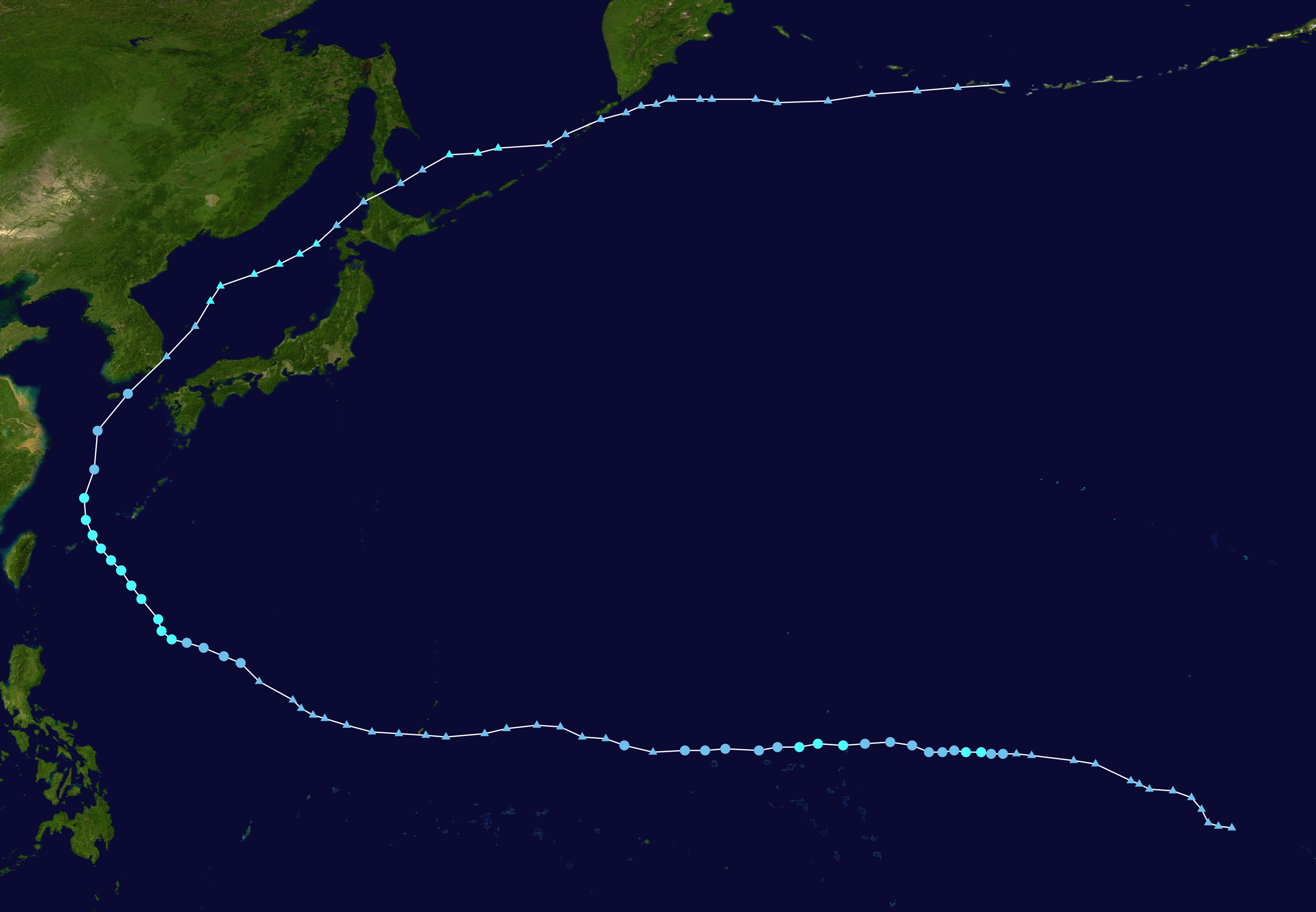
- Duration: August 10 – August 23
- Peak intensity: 85 km/h (50 mph) (10-min); 994 hPa (mbar)

On August 6, the Central Pacific Hurricane Center (CPHC) first noted an area of disturbed weather positioned around 1,000 mi (1,610 km) south-southwest of Honolulu. Four days later, the low-pressure area crossed the International Date Line, and on August 10, at 06:00 UTC, the JMA declared it as a tropical depression as it was located northeast of Ratak. By 13:00 UTC, the JTWC issued a TCFA for the system as satellite imagery showed it had developed a well-defined low-level circulation. At 15:00 UTC, the JTWC recognized it as a tropical depression and designated it as 16W as satellite imagery depicted developing spiral bands and a defined low-level circulation center. The system briefly became a tropical storm; However, at 21:00 UTC, the JTWC downgraded it to a tropical depression as its convection struggled to organize itself. It regained its intensity at 09:00 UTC the next day as its convection became more organized. Satellite imagery also continued to indicate the presence of a well-defined low-level circulation center. It was downgraded to a tropical depression again on the next day as its low-level circulation center became less defined. On August 16, at 00:00 UTC, the JMA issued its final advisory for the system, losing its tropical cyclone characteristics because of unfavorable conditions. Later at 00:00 UTC, the next day, the JMA started tracking the system again. At 09:00 UTC, the JTWC issued its final advisory as the system's convection became further disorganized despite the presence of a marginally favorable environment. At 19:30 UTC on August 18, the JTWC issued a TCFA for its remnants as its low-level circulation center improved significantly. On August 19, the system was upgraded by PAGASA to a tropical depression, and a few hours later, it received the local name Isang as it entered the Philippine Area of Responsibility. At 15:00 UTC, the system was re-upgraded to a tropical depression by the JTWC, as its deep convection started to become more organized over the low-level center. On August 20, at 12:00 UTC, the JMA upgraded to a tropical storm, naming it as Omais. Favorable conditions like high sea-surface temperatures, high tropical cyclone heat potential, and low wind shear helped it to develop over the past few hours. The JTWC did the same thing at 21:00 UTC, the same day. At 18:00 UTC the next day, the JMA upgraded it to a severe tropical storm as satellite imagery showed convective bursts gathering around the center in a curved manner; however, shortly after at 06:00 UTC on August 22, it weakened into a tropical storm due to increasing wind shear from the westerlies. At 03:00 UTC on August 23, the JTWC downgraded it to a tropical depression as its convection was severely affected by the extremely high westerly wind shear. On August 24 at 00:00 UTC, the JMA issued its final advisory as the system became an extratropical cyclone over the Sea of Japan. Nine hours later, the JTWC followed and issued its last warning for Omais.

As the system neared the islands of Guam, the NWS issued a tropical storm watch at 22:36 UTC on August 14. At 10:00 UTC on August 15, the NWS issued a tropical storm watch for the island of Rota. However, all watches were lifted by the NWS at 09:14 UTC the next day as the system further weakened.

=== Severe Tropical Storm Conson (Jolina) ===
- Severe tropical storm (JMA)
- Category 1 typhoon (SSHWS)
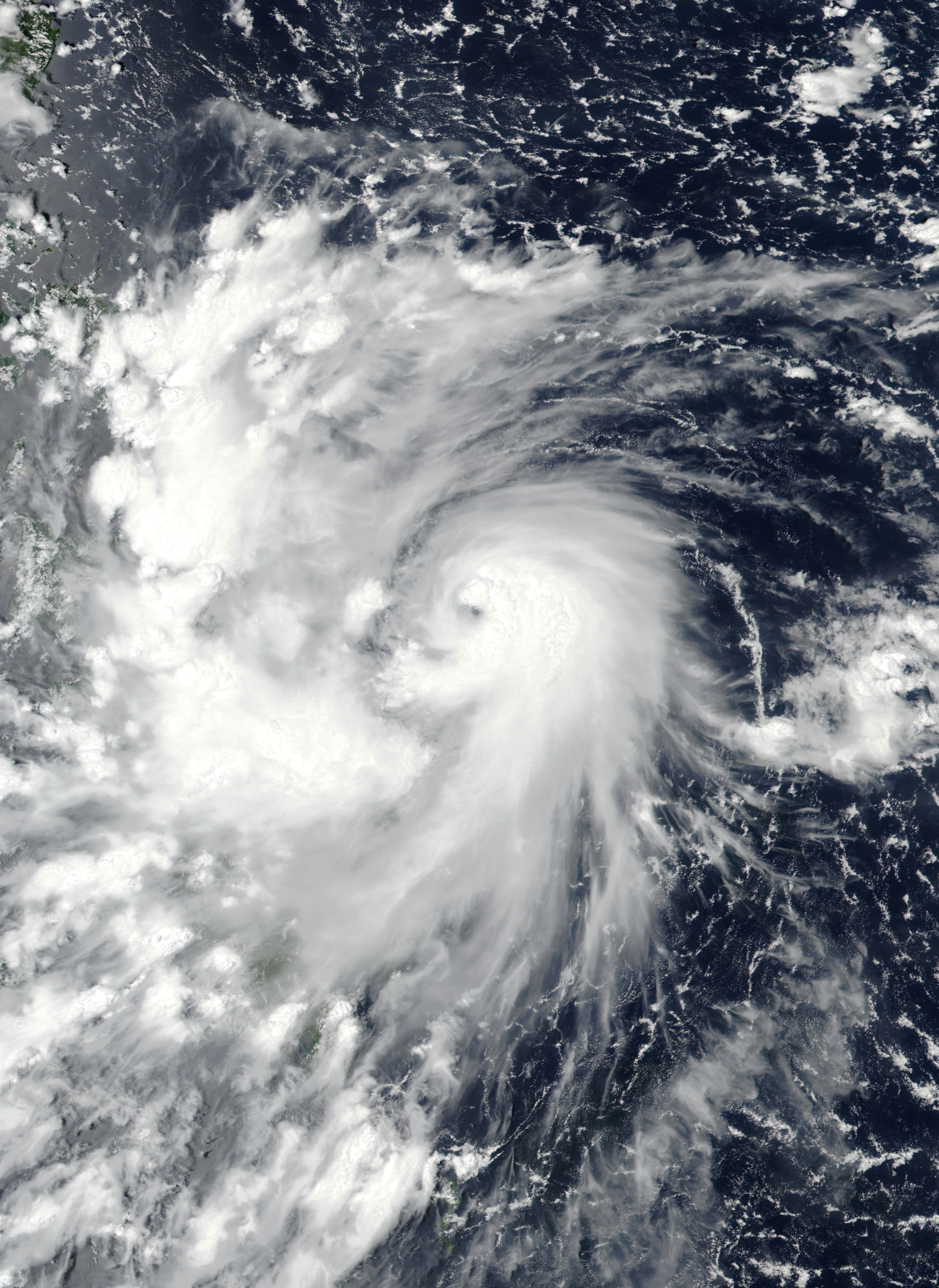
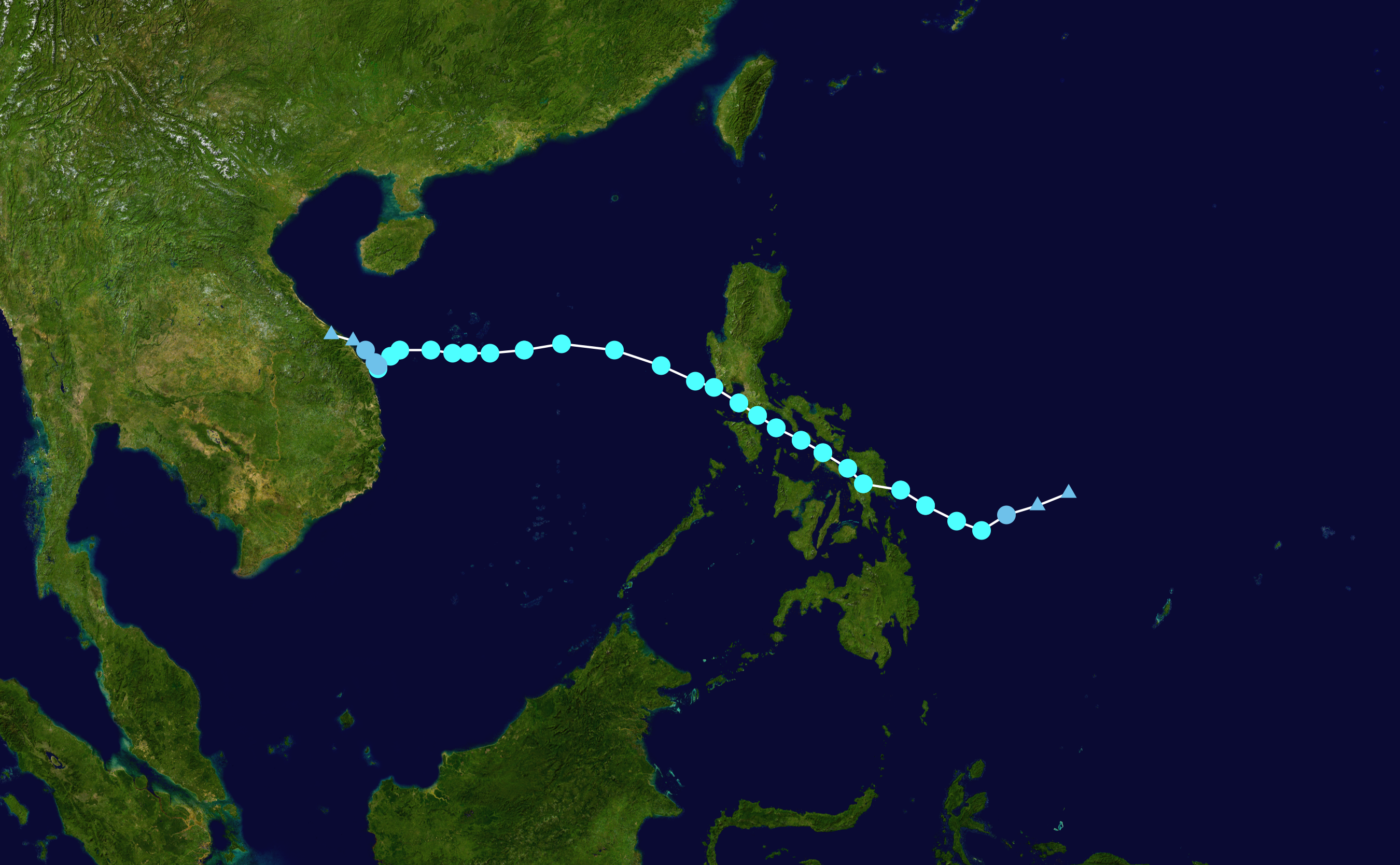
- Duration: September 5 – September 13
- Peak intensity: 95 km/h (60 mph) (10-min); 992 hPa (mbar)

On September 3, a disturbance was noted by the JTWC, approximately 195 nmi (225 mi; 360 km) from Andersen Air Force Base in Yigo, Guam, as it developed a weakly defined low-level circulation center. The disturbance gradually intensified, and on September 5, the JMA recognized the system as a tropical depression. Later that day, the JTWC issued a TCFA as its low-level circulation center and its surrounding convection became well organized. The agency recognized the system as a tropical depression around four hours later. At 21:00 UTC, the PAGASA recognized the system as a tropical depression, with the agency assigning it the local name Jolina. The next day on 06:00 UTC, the JMA upgraded the system to a tropical storm, assigning it the international name Conson, with the JTWC following suit three hours later. At 12:00 UTC, the JTWC upgraded it typhoon before downgrading it into a tropical storm at 18:00 UTC. Three hours later, the JMA upgraded it to a severe tropical storm. At the same moment, Conson rapidly intensified into a typhoon according to the PAGASA as it made its first landfall on Hernani, Eastern Samar. Conson then made another landfall at 02:30 PHT (18:30 UTC) in Daram, Samar, and another one at 03:40 PHT (19:40 UTC) in Santo Niño, Samar. At 06:30 PHT (22:30 UTC), Conson made a fourth landfall in Almagro, Samar. At 00:00 UTC on September 7, the JMA downgraded it to a tropical storm as it was significantly weakened by multiple landfalls. Conson then made a fifth landfall in Dimasalang, Masbate at 11:00 PHT (03:00 UTC), later weakening into a severe tropical storm, according to PAGASA. Conson then made a sixth landfall over Torrijos, Marinduque. Conson continued to pummel through more islands, making a seventh landfall over the area in Lobo, Batangas. After making its eighth landfall at San Juan, Batangas, Conson traversed the Batangas – Cavite area as the PAGASA declared it to have weakened back into a tropical storm. Conson made its ninth and final landfall in the vicinity of Mariveles, Bataan. At 12:00 UTC, Conson re-intensified into a severe tropical storm, as it entered the West Philippine Sea. Three hours later, the PAGASA issued its final bulletin for Conson as it exited the PAR and accelerated westward.

As Conson moved westward, it came in contact with unfavorable conditions such as increasing vertical wind shear and land interaction with Vietnam. These conditions made Conson weaken, prompting the JMA to downgrade it to a tropical storm at 12:00 UTC on September 11 to further downgrade it to a tropical depression at 18:00 UTC the same day, with the JTWC downgrading it to a tropical depression at 03:00 UTC on September 12. It stalled off the coast of Vietnam near Quang Nam because of the confluence of three ridges. At 21:00 UTC, the JTWC issued its final advisory as it made landfall near Da Nang, Vietnam, which caused the system to weaken rapidly. Satellite imagery showed that its low-level circulation center weakened significantly and became less defined. By 18:00 UTC of September 13, the JMA stopped tracking Conson, as the agency last noted it at 12:00 UTC.

According to the NDRRMC, 23 people were killed in the Philippines due to the storm, with combined infrastructural and agricultural damages pegged at ₱5.17 billion (US$88.3 million). In Vietnam, 2 people were killed by flooding. Agriculture damages on the offshore island of Lý Sơn was estimated to be about 100 billion ₫ (US$3.9 million).

=== Typhoon Chanthu (Kiko) ===
- Violent typhoon (JMA)
- Category 5 super typhoon (SSHWS)
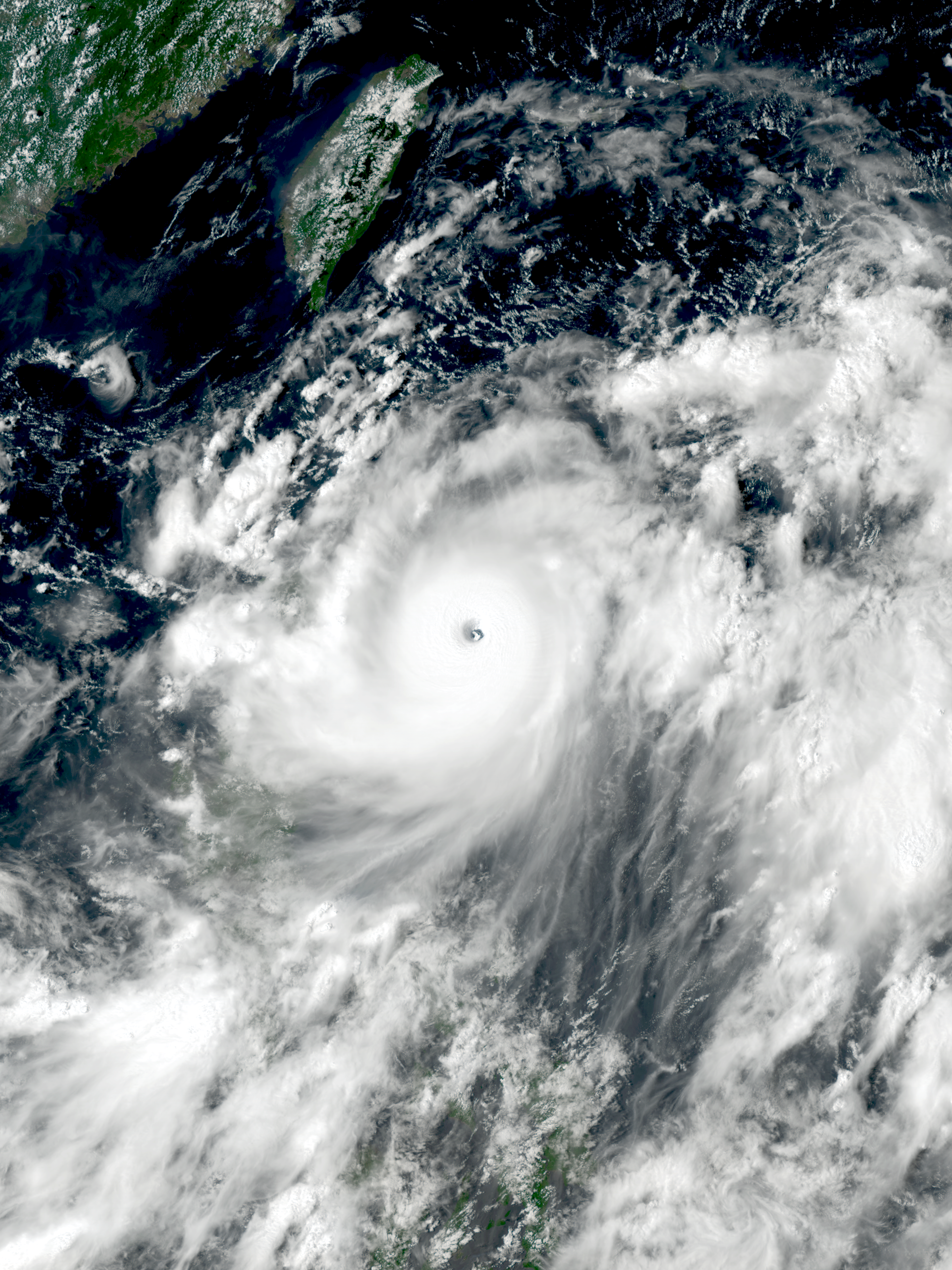
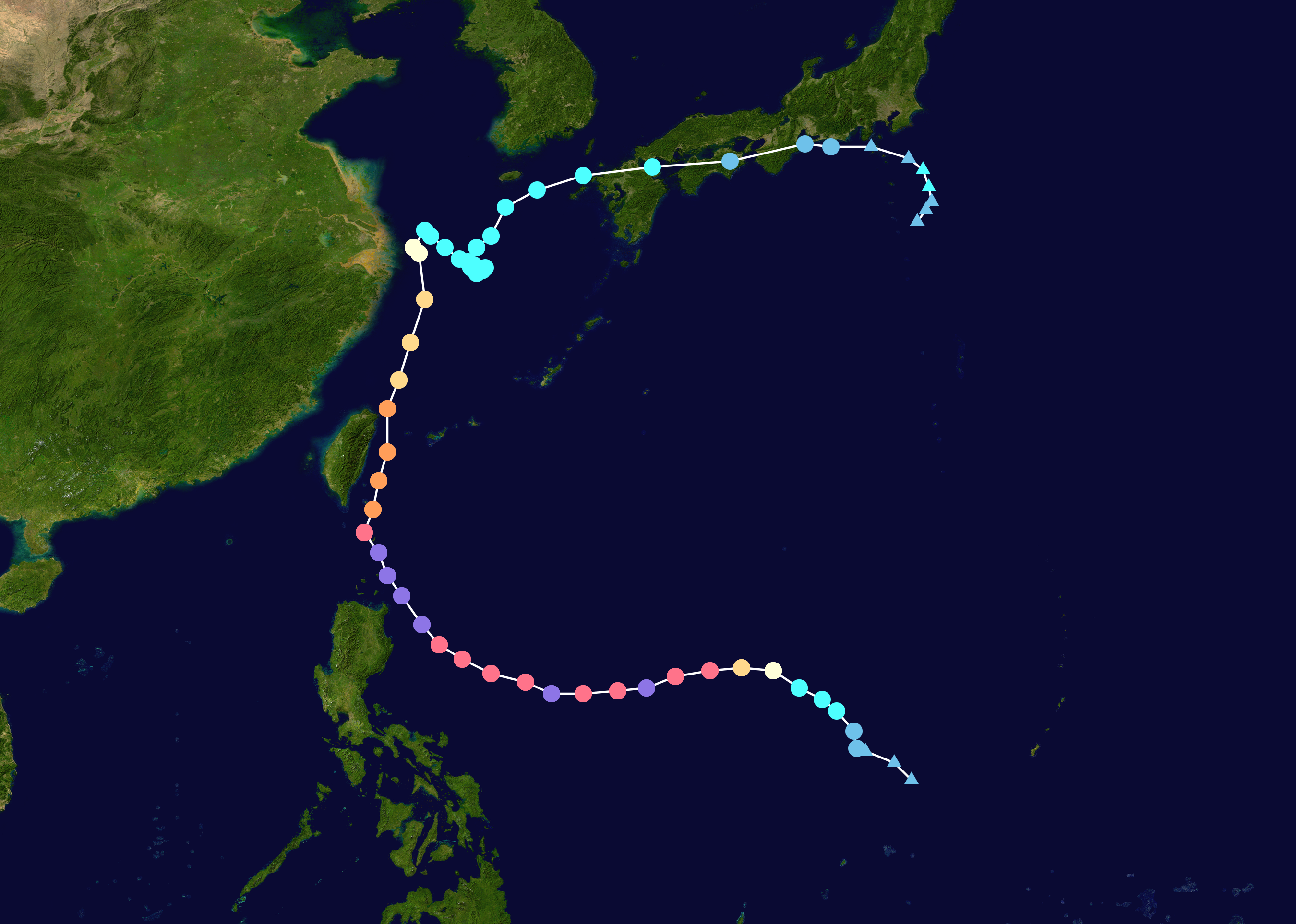
- Duration: September 5 – September 18
- Peak intensity: 215 km/h (130 mph) (10-min); 905 hPa (mbar)

At 06:00 UTC on September 5, the JTWC began monitoring an area of convection that had formed 446 nmi (513 mi; 826 km) from Legazpi, Philippines. At 18:00 UTC the same day, the JMA declared it as a tropical depression. Five and half hours later, the JTWC issued a TCFA as its circulation and convection had significantly improved. At 09:00 UTC the next day, the JTWC upgraded the disturbance to a tropical depression, designating it as 19W. The JTWC later upgraded it to a tropical storm as it was noted that an eye-like feature was forming. The JMA later did the same at 00:00 UTC on September 7, naming it Chanthu. At 09:30 UTC, the PAGASA reported that Chanthu entered the PAR, assigning it the name Kiko. At 12:00 UTC, the JMA upgraded it to a severe tropical storm. At the same moment, Chanthu started its rapid intensification as it quickly became a minimal typhoon. Several hours later, the typhoon reached Category 4-equivalent status, and by the next day at 09:00 UTC, it reached Category 5-equivalent intensity, developing a 5 nmi (10 km; 5 mi)-wide eye which was surrounded by very compact, intense convection. After reaching its initial peak, Chanthu was downgraded to a Category 4-equivalent super typhoon as its pinhole-shaped eye started to fade. However, by September 10, Chanthu began to re-intensify as its eye began to clear up. Chanthu further intensified into a Category 5-equivalent super typhoon once again at 09:00 UTC that day. On 05:00 PHT on September 11 (21:00 UTC on September 10), the PAGASA reported that Chanthu passed to the east of the Babuyan Islands; at 08:30 PHT (00:30 UTC), Chanthu made landfall in Ivana, Batanes as the storm began to weaken slightly. On September 11, Chanthu began to weaken as it continued to move northwards with the presence of dry air. The PAGASA issued its last bulletin for Chanthu since it exited the PAR on the next day. By September 14, Chanthu was no longer a typhoon as it slowly moved south-eastwards towards Japan. Due to decreasing wind shear and marginally favorable sea surface temperatures, Chanthu strengthened enough for the JMA to re-classify it as a severe tropical storm on the next day. On September 17 on 09:00 UTC, Chanthu crossed near the town of Ikitsuki, Nagasaki in Japan. It continued to move northwards as it moved through the rugged Japanese islands, causing it to weaken significantly. This caused the JMA to downgrade it to a tropical storm three hours later. At 21:00 UTC, the JTWC downgraded it to a tropical depression, as it was also undergoing extratropical transition. On September 18, the JTWC issued its final warning for the system.

Chanthu caused devastating effects in the islands of Batanes as it was made a direct hit from the typhoon. According to the local residents it was the most ferocious storm even seen. More than 30,000 residents were affected from Region I, II, III and CAR. Four municipalities went without power and none were restored and one municipality experienced water supply outage and none were restored. There were also reports of landslide and flooding mostly from Region I and III. As of September 15, total damages from the typhoon were up to ₱37.4 million (US$748,000). On September 12, Chanthu passed east of Taiwan. This caused heavy rainfall over the island including the capital city Taipei. Up to 13 cm (5.1 in) of rainfall was recorded and winds up to 164 km/h (102 mph) were reported. In China, the storm shut down both Shanghai Port, the world's largest container port, and Ningbo-Zhoushan Port, the world's largest port by cargo throughput, briefly on 12–September 14, with about 86 vessels waiting outside the ports. As Chanthu passed near the island of Jeju, it caused winds up to 30 to 40 m/s (110 to 145 km/h; 65 to 90 mph) and 50 mm (2.0 in) of rainfall. There were reports of structural damage and overwhelmed drainage systems on the island. 23 flights were grounded and 48 ferry sailings were cancelled.

=== Typhoon Mindulle ===
- Violent typhoon (JMA)
- Category 5 super typhoon (SSHWS)
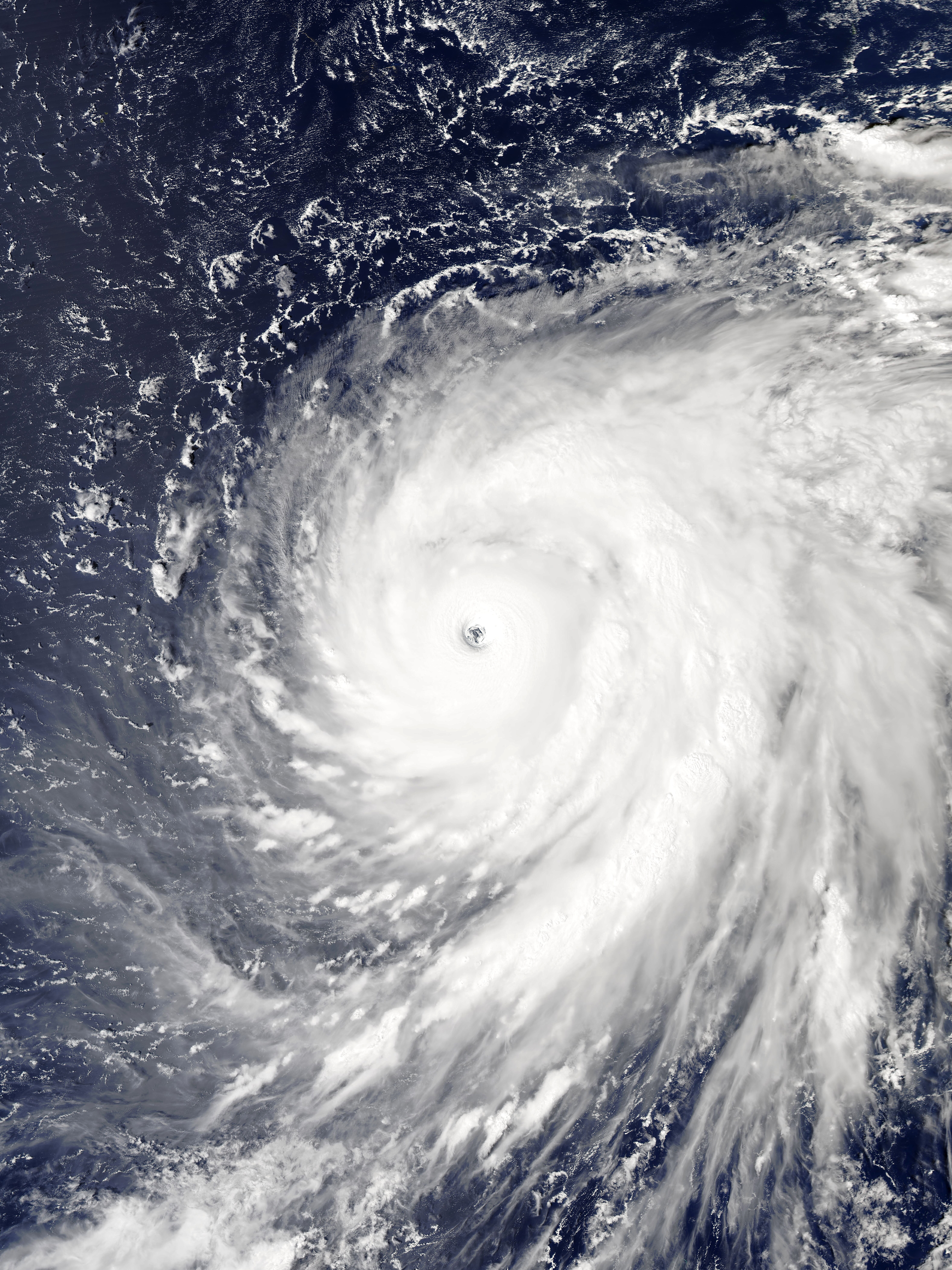
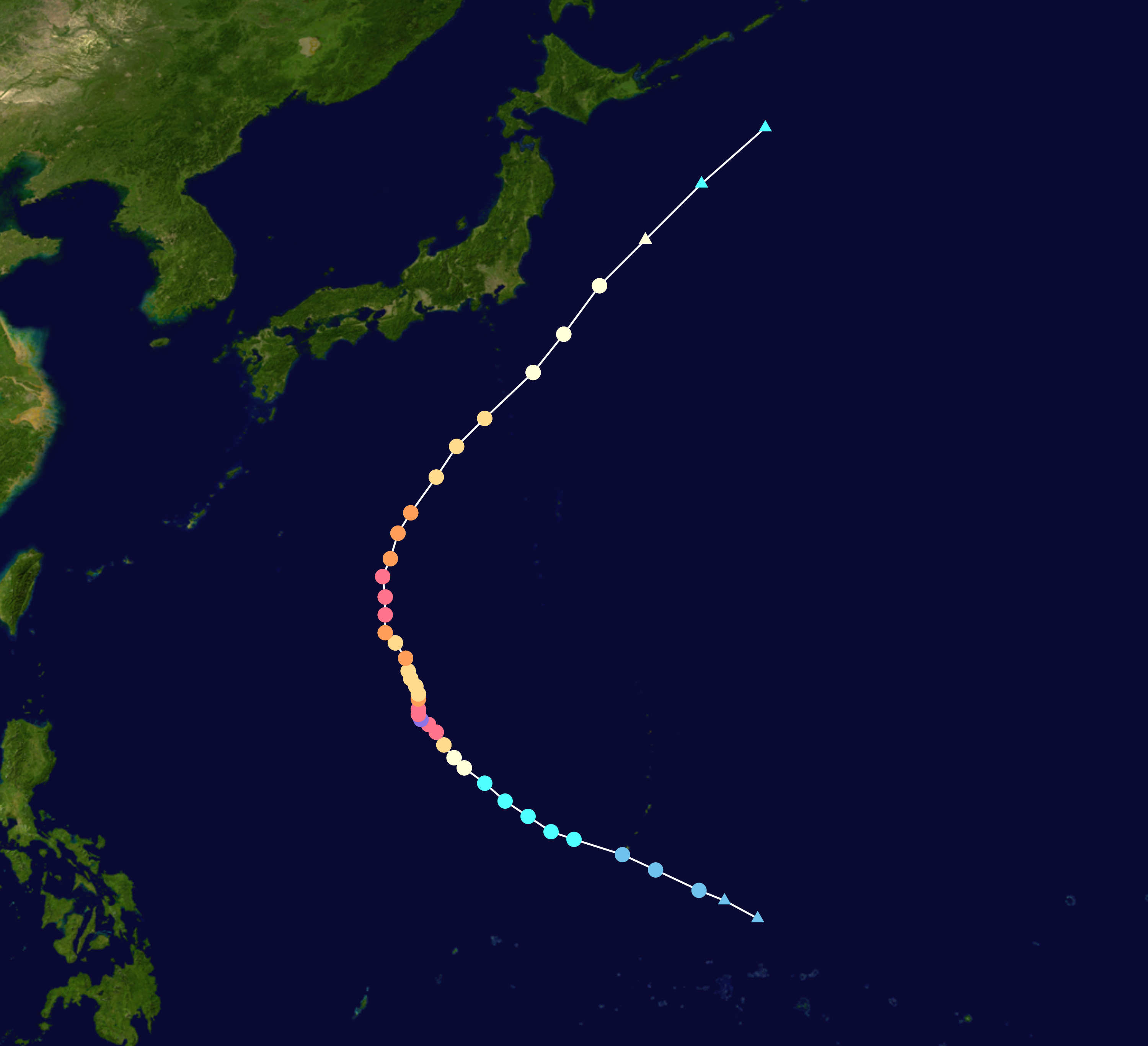
- Duration: September 22 – October 2
- Peak intensity: 195 km/h (120 mph) (10-min); 920 hPa (mbar)

On September 21, the JTWC spotted an area of convection formed approximately 703 nmi (1,302 km; 809 mi) from Guam. The system rapidly consolidated itself and formed a well-defined LLCC, and thus, the system strengthened into a tropical depression on 00:00 UTC of September 22. The JTWC did the same later that day, designating the system as 20W. At 09:00 UTC of September 23, the JTWC upgraded it to a tropical storm, as its low-level circulation center became partially exposed. The JMA did the same three hours later, and named it Mindulle.

At 12:00 UTC of September 24, the JMA upgraded it to a severe tropical storm. By 03:00 UTC the next day, the JTWC upgraded it to a Category 1-equivalent typhoon, as it developed a small eye. The presence of dry air had slowed its intensification, but it still managed to become a typhoon. Mindulle started to rapidly intensify as it quickly intensified into a Category 2-equivalent typhoon. Its eye expanded but became ragged due to the presence of dry air. Mindulle continued its rapid intensification, as it further intensified into a Category 4-equivalent typhoon at 15:00 UTC. Its eye became well-defined and at 03:00 UTC the next day, it became a Category 5-equivalent super typhoon, making it the third super typhoon of this season. Satellite imagery showed that the typhoon had developed a well defined 15 nmi (28 km; 17 mi) eye and deepening of the central core.

At 15:00 UTC, Mindulle weakened into a Category 4-equivalent super typhoon as the eye and the convective structure started to degrade. It also underwent an eyewall replacement cycle, as it developed another eyewall. At 03:00 UTC of September 27, the JTWC further downgraded the system to a Category 3-equivalent typhoon, and six hours later, the agency had further downgraded it to a Category 2-equivalent typhoon because of the effects of the eyewall replacement cycle and the increasing presence of dry air. At 15:00 UTC of September 28, Mindulle re-intensified into a Category 3-equivalent typhoon, as it moved over favorable conditions. Satellite imagery showed that the typhoon continued to struggle to intensify. Its 20 nmi (37 km; 23 mi) eye had steadily shrunk but it remained cloud covered and ragged. By the next day at 03:00 UTC, the JTWC re-upgraded it to a Category 4-equivalent typhoon as the eye cleared out again. At 21:00 UTC of September 29, it rapidly weakened and by 15:00 UTC the next day, it weakened from a Category 3-equivalent typhoon to a Category 1-equivalent typhoon. Cool dry air and cool sea-surface temperatures were responsible for the weakening. At 21:00 UTC of October 1, the JTWC issued its final warning as it downgraded to a tropical storm. Three hours later, JMA also issued its final warning, as it became extratropical cyclone, off the coast of Hokkaido.

=== Tropical Storm Dianmu ===
- Tropical storm (JMA)
- Tropical storm (SSHWS)
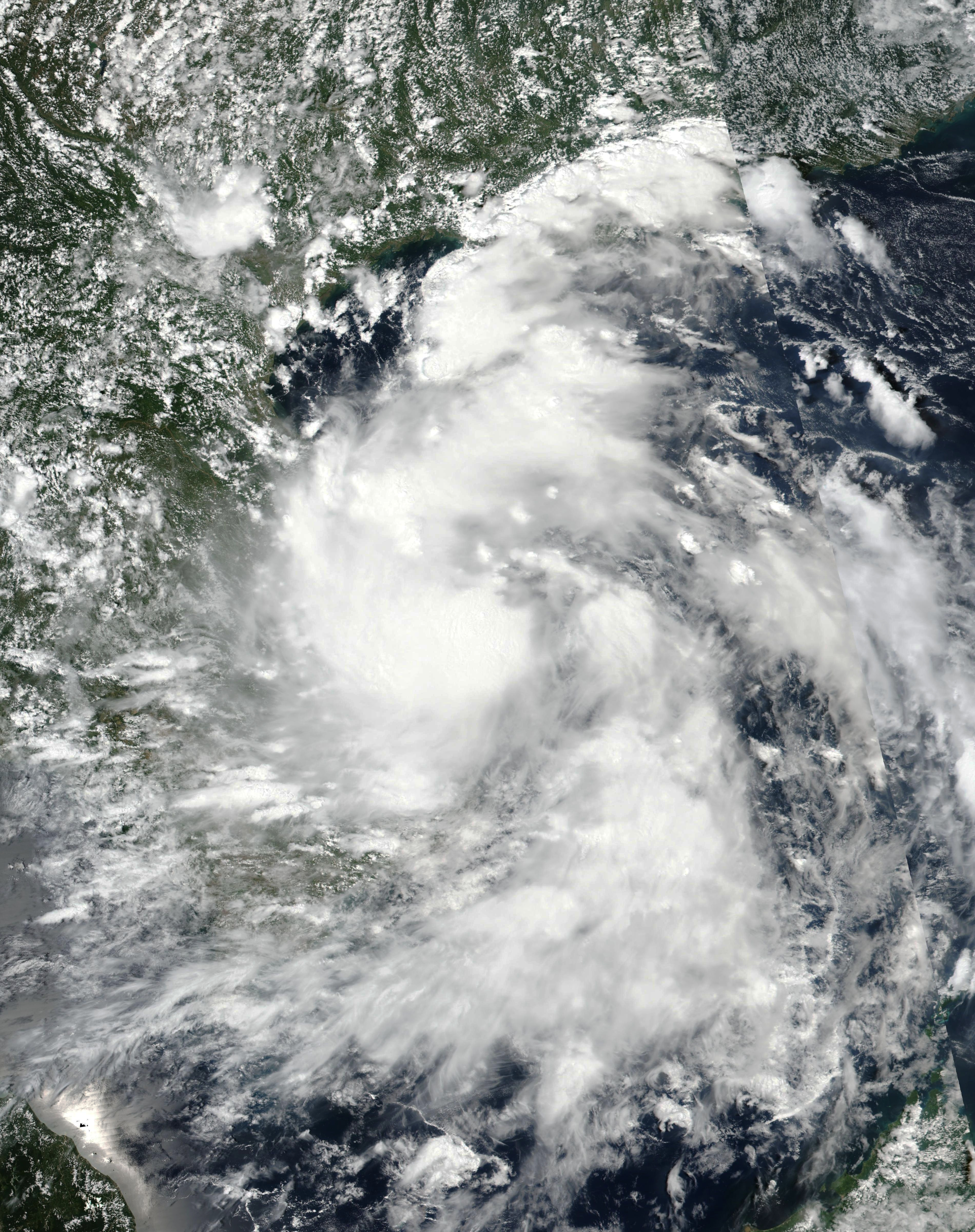
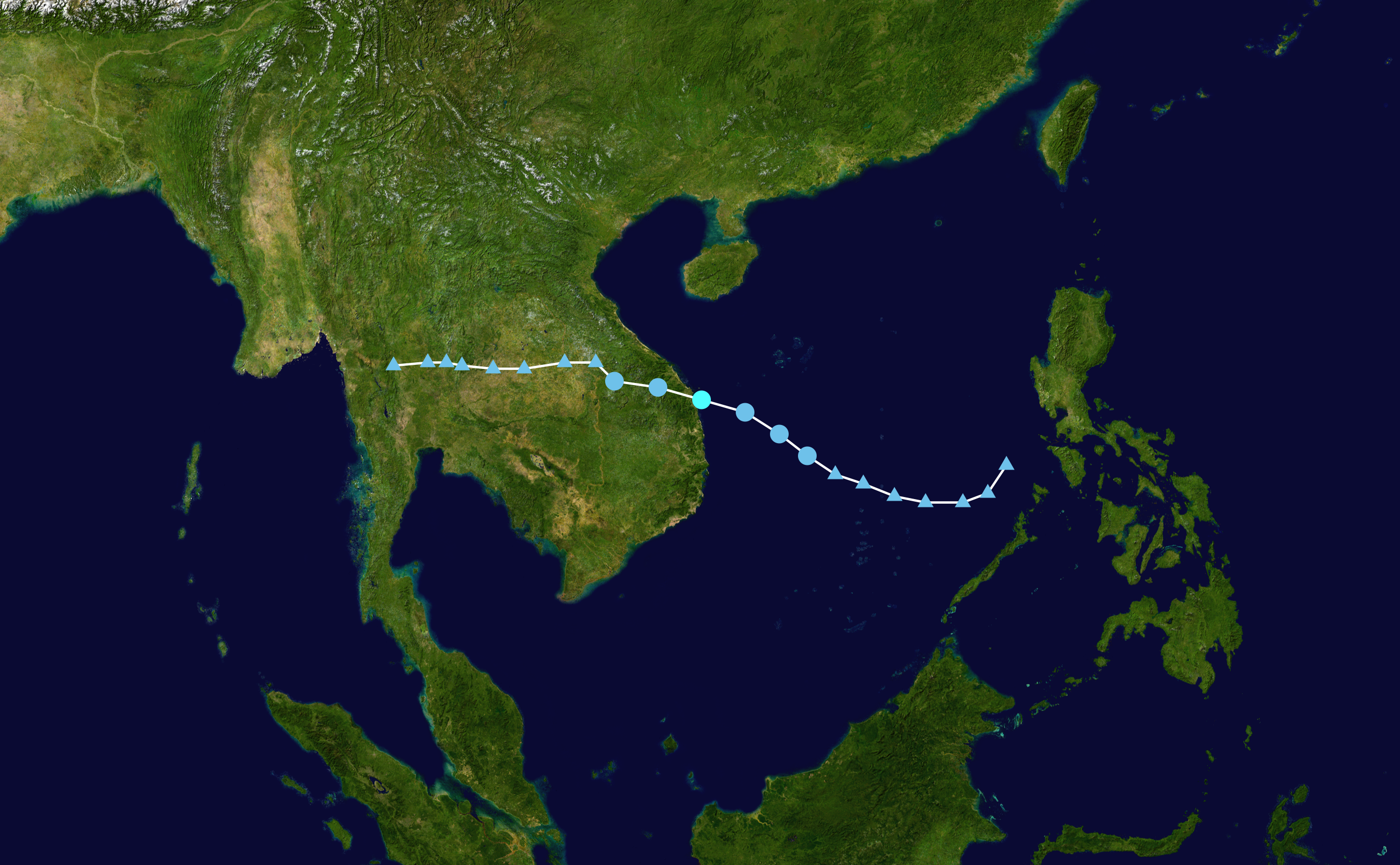
- Duration: September 22 – September 25
- Peak intensity: 65 km/h (40 mph) (10-min); 1000 hPa (mbar)

On September 21 at 18:00 UTC, the JMA noted a westward-moving low-pressure area over the South China Sea near the Philippines. Three hours later, the JTWC recognized this system. By 15:00 UTC the next day, the JTWC upgraded it to a tropical depression without issuing a TCFA for the system, as it rapidly improved its convective structure and developed a low-level circulation center; the JMA did the same three hours later. On September 23 at 06:00 UTC, the JMA upgraded it to a tropical storm and named it as Dianmu as it continued to move westward and come closer to the Vietnamese coastline. The JTWC did the same thing, three hours later. At 15:00 UTC, the JTWC issued its last warning on the system as it made landfall near Da Nang, Vietnam, with its low-level circulation center being hampered following landfall. At 06:00 UTC on September 24, the JMA downgraded it to a tropical depression as it moved further inland.

Dianmu caused a total of 8 deaths, of which 6 occurred in Thailand and 2 occurred in Vietnam.

=== Tropical Storm Lionrock (Lannie) ===
- Tropical storm (JMA)
- Tropical storm (SSHWS)
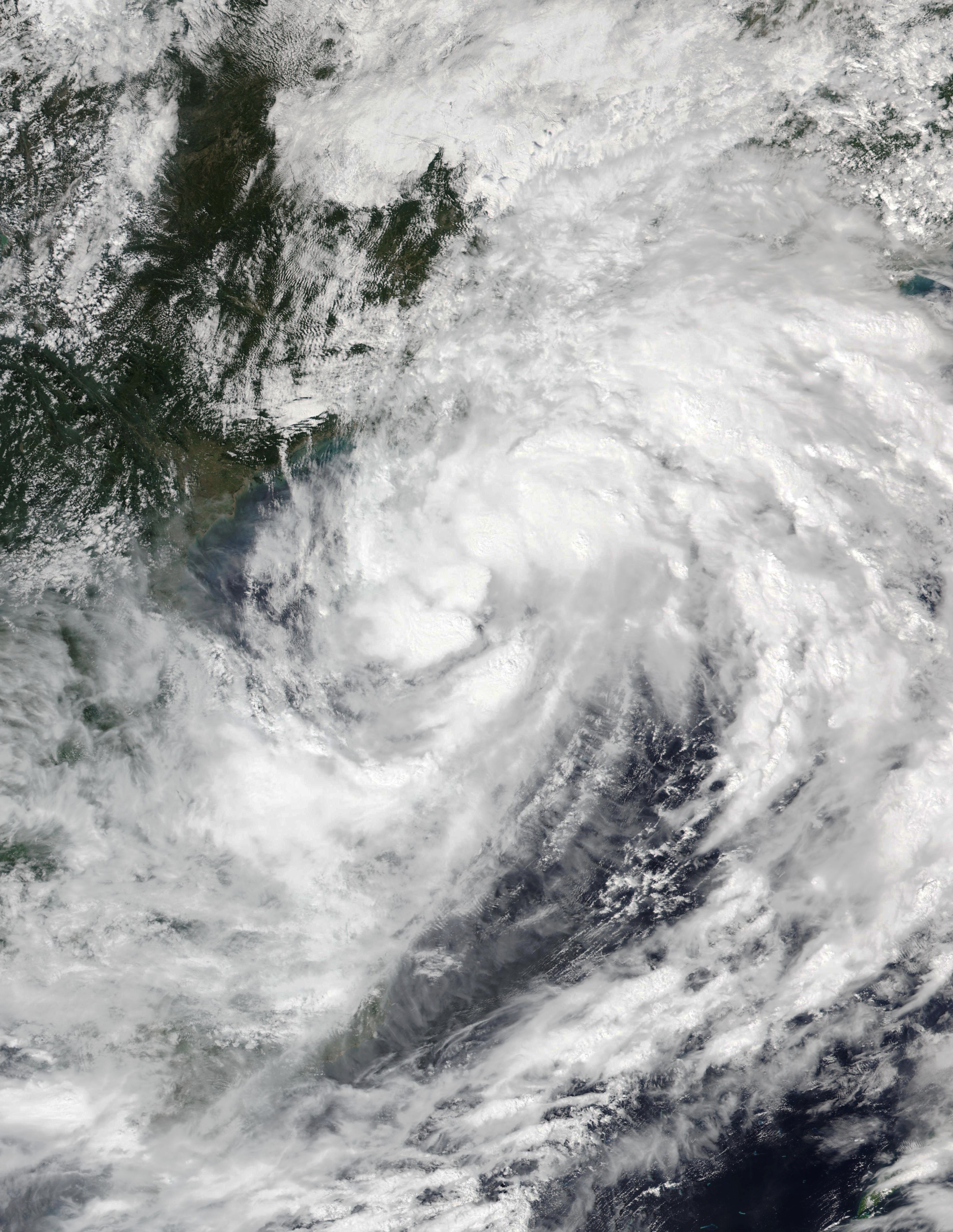
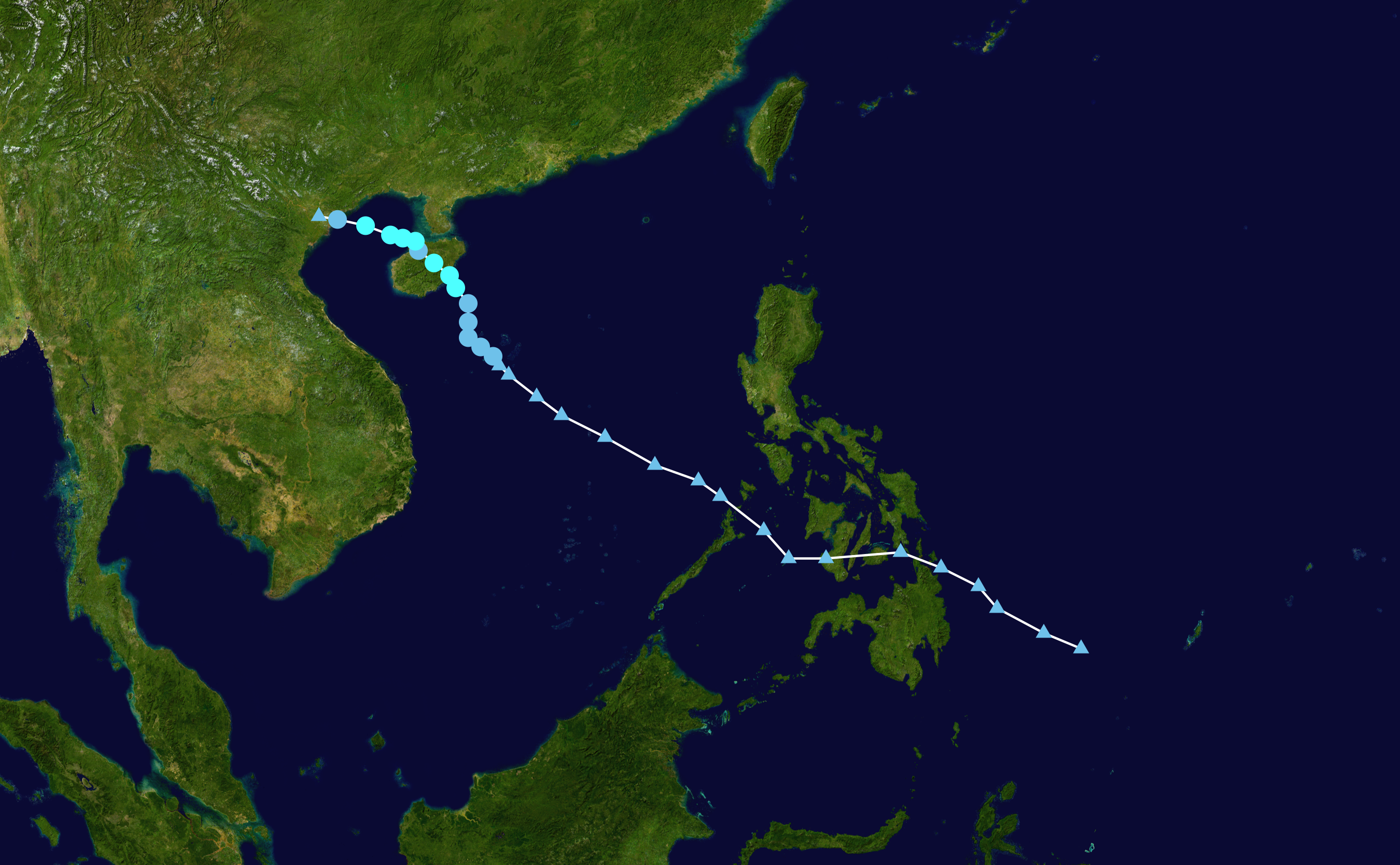
- Duration: October 5 – October 10
- Peak intensity: 65 km/h (40 mph) (10-min); 994 hPa (mbar)

On October 2, the JTWC noted an area of convection located approximately 495 nautical miles (917 km; 570 mi) east of Davao, Philippines The next day, PAGASA had already classified the system as a tropical depression and named it Lannie. Lannie made its first landfall on Bucas Grande Island at 04:30 PHT (October 3, 20:00 UTC). It then made an additional seven landfalls: ones in Cagdianao in the Dinagat Islands, Liloan and Padre Burgos in Southern Leyte, Mahanay Island and Getafe in Bohol, San Fernando in Cebu, Guihulngan in Negros Oriental, and its last two landfalls at Iloc Island and El Nido, Palawan. At 14:30 UTC of October 4, the JTWC re-issued a TCFA for the system, as it moved over the South China Sea. At 06:00 UTC of October 5, the JMA recognized it as a tropical depression. At 11:00 PHT (03:00 UTC) of October 6, the PAGASA issued its final warning. At 09:00 UTC of the next day, the JTWC upgraded from a monsoonal depression to a tropical depression. It was designated as 22W. Before landfall in Hainan, the JMA upgraded it to a tropical storm and named it Lionrock at 18:00 UTC.

Lionrock continued its trajectory, and between 09:00 UTC and 15:00 UTC of October 8, it made its first landfall over the island of Hainan. After making landfall, it briefly intensified a bit before weakening to its original intensity at 21:00 UTC. At 09:00 UTC of the next day, it crossed the island completely and entered the Gulf of Tonkin. On October 10, at 09:00 UTC, the JTWC downgraded it to a tropical depression and issued its last warning, as it made landfall near Cat Bi International Airport and its convection became disorganized over land.

=== Severe Tropical Storm Kompasu (Maring) ===
- Severe tropical storm (JMA)
- Tropical storm (SSHWS)
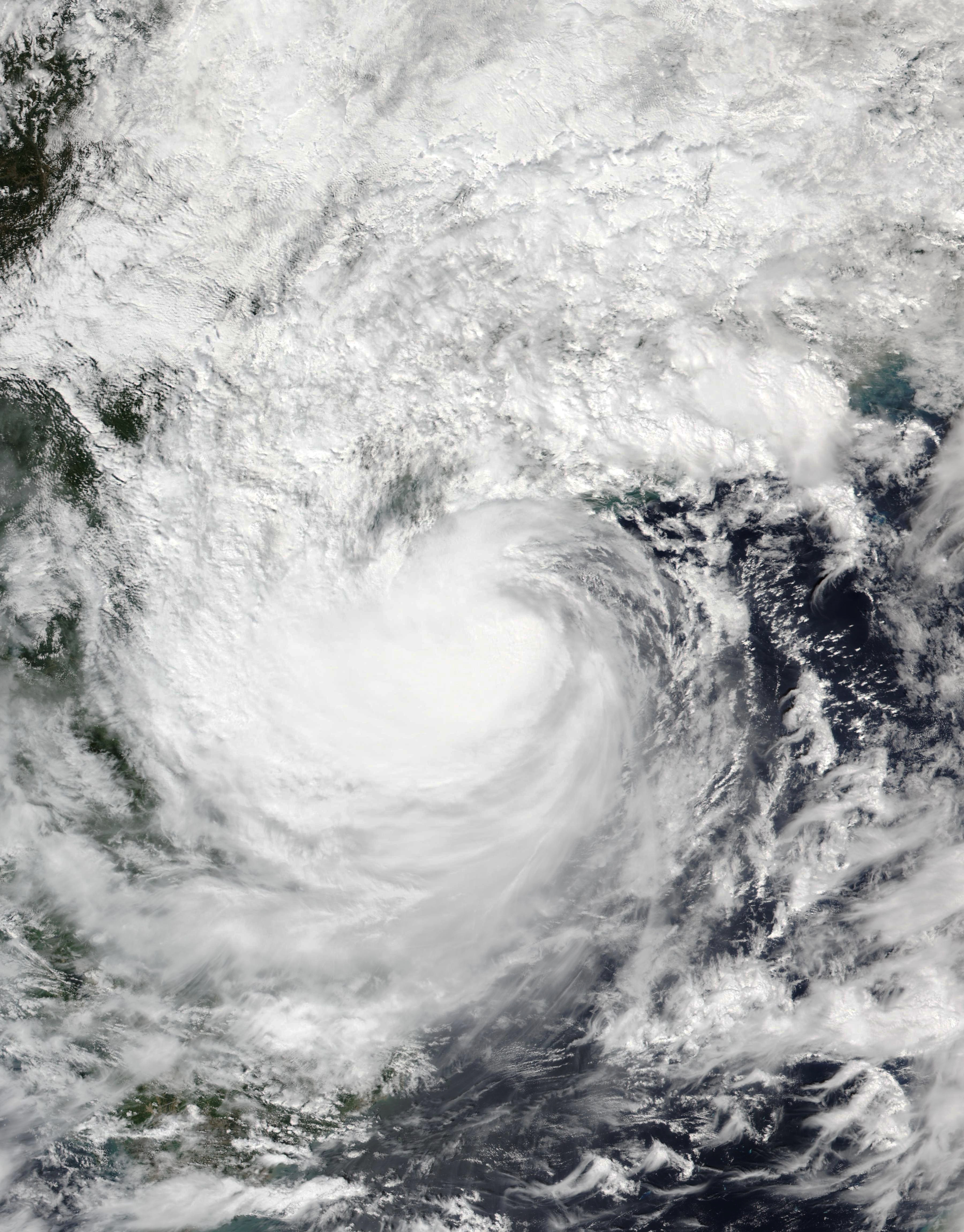
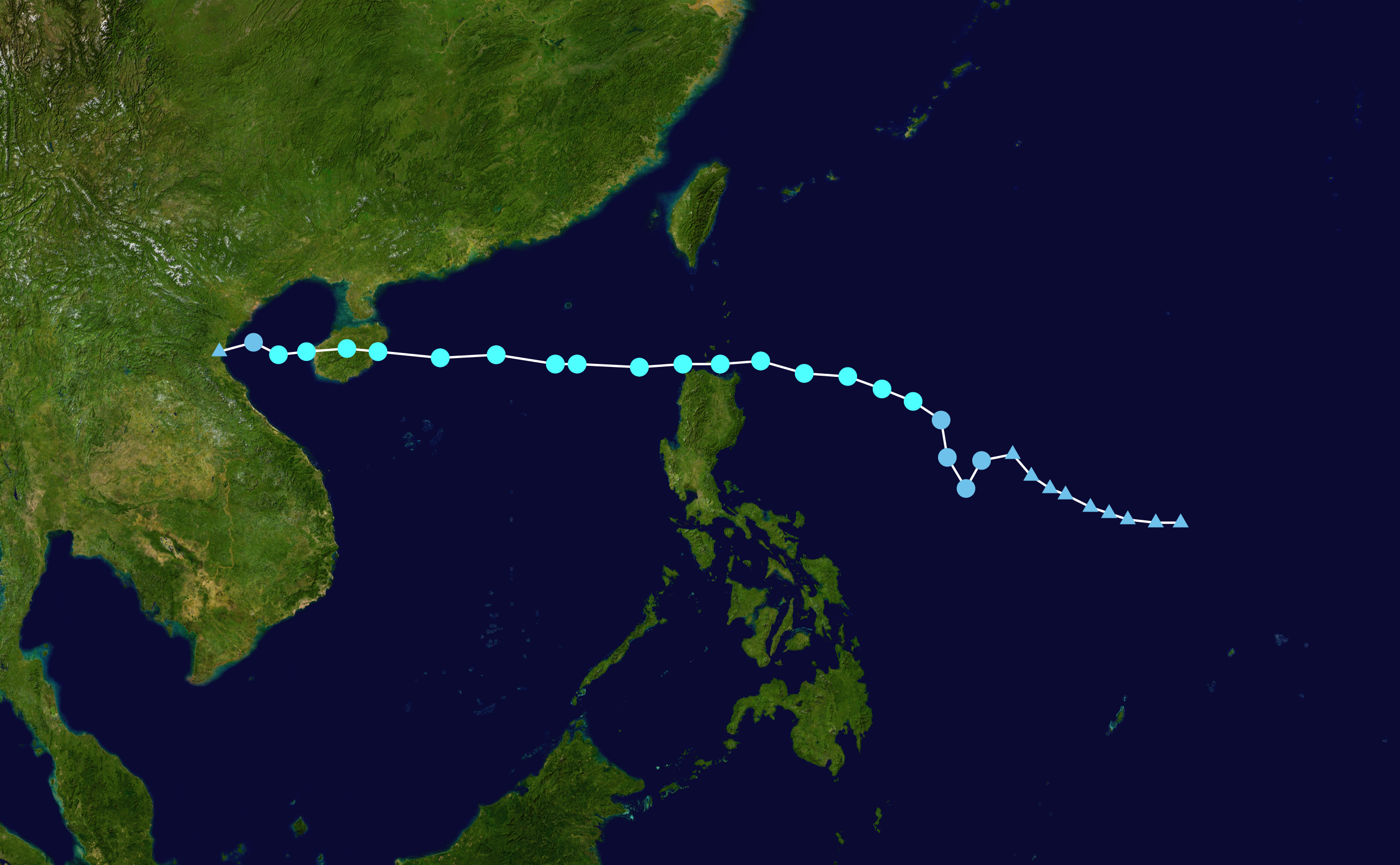
- Duration: October 7 – October 14
- Peak intensity: 100 km/h (65 mph) (10-min); 975 hPa (mbar)

On October 6 of 18:00 UTC, the JMA noted that a low-pressure area had formed that was embedded in a large monsoonal circulation to the north of Palau. The system developed into a tropical depression at 00:00 UTC of the next day. At 09:00 UTC (17:00 PHT), the PAGASA issued its first bulletin for the first tropical depression and assigned it the name Maring. The JMA also noted the persistence of another, nearby tropical depression to its northeast, later named Nando. As it is embedded in the same monsoonal depression and due to its proximity, Nando began to merge with Maring, and therefore formed a rather broad and large circulation. This prompted the JMA to upgrade the overall system to a tropical storm, and was named Kompasu. However at that time, the JTWC still considered the system as two separate disturbances and issued separate TCFAs later in the day for both depressions, albeit noting the possibility of merging. The JTWC later considered the entire system as merged with their first warning for Kompasu. At midnight of October 11, the JMA upgraded it to a severe tropical storm, as it attained good cloud characteristics. At 12:10 UTC (20:10 PHT), Kompasu made its first landfall near Fuga Island of Cagayan Province. At 05:00 PHT of October 13 (21:00 UTC of October 12), the PAGASA issued its final bulletin as its exited the PAR and continued towards Hainan. Between 03:00 and 09:00 UTC of October 13, Kompasu had made landfall over the east coast of Hainan. By 18:00 UTC, the JMA downgraded it to a tropical storm, as it crossed the entire island and entered the Gulf of Tonkin, as its convection had rapidly weakened because of the rough terrain of the island. At 09:00 UTC of the next day, the JTWC issued its final warning followed by downgrading to a tropical depression, as its convection had diminished and the low-level circulation center had been weakened significantly because of the increasing vertical wind shear and dry air, despite not making landfall over northern Vietnam. The JMA issued its final warning after downgrading it to a tropical depression at 18:00 UTC.

As of October 31, the NDRRMC has confirmed a total of 43 deaths, along with 16 people still missing. Total estimated damages of both infrastructure and agriculture is topped to ₱6.39 billion (US$126.5 million). In Hong Kong, one person was killed and 21 people were injured.

=== Severe Tropical Storm Namtheun ===
- Severe tropical storm (JMA)
- Tropical storm (SSHWS)
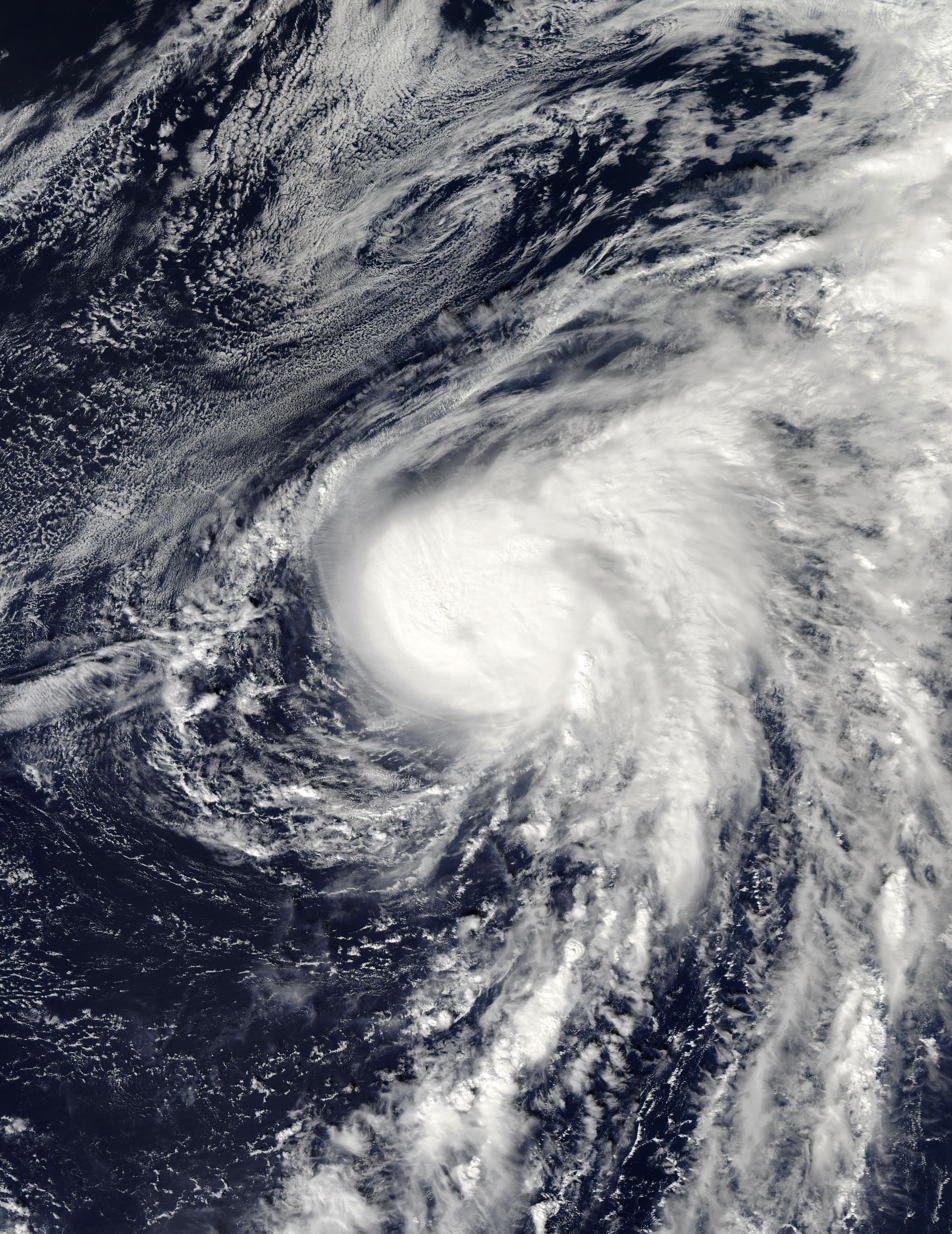
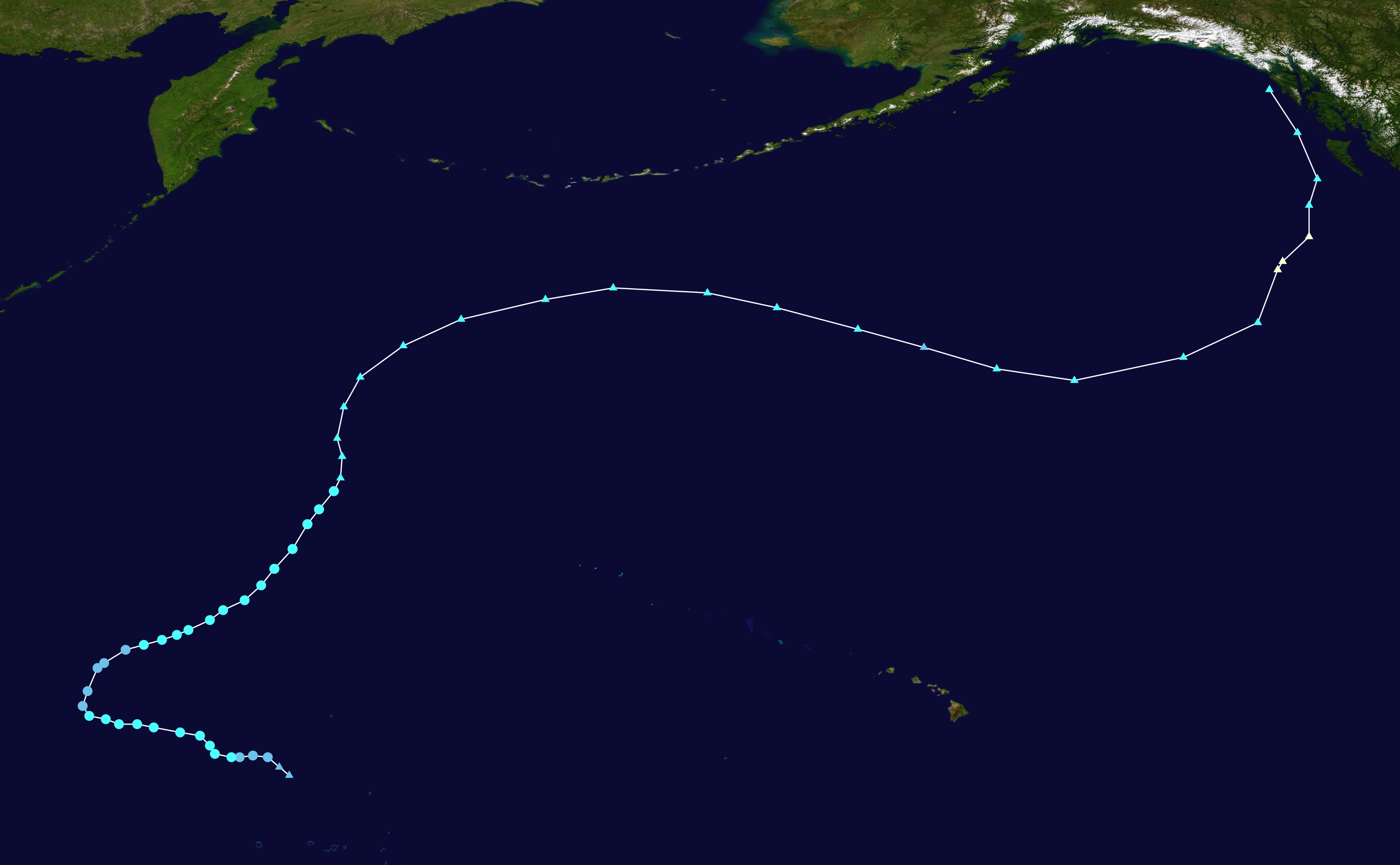
- Duration: October 8 – October 16
- Peak intensity: 95 km/h (60 mph) (10-min); 996 hPa (mbar)

On October 8, the JTWC noted an area of convection persisted approximately 289 nmi (535 km; 333 mi) from Wake Island, which had a defined low-level circulation with a good outflow. The JMA later recognized the same area of convection as a tropical depression on October 9. At 14:00 UTC the same day, the JTWC issued a TCFA for the invest as it developed a flaring convection which was circulating over the obscured LLCC. By midnight of the next day, the JMA upgraded it to a tropical storm and named it Namtheun. The JTWC recognized it as a tropical depression, three hours later, and six hours later, the JTWC upgraded it to a tropical storm. Namtheun managed to maintain its intensity for two days, until at 09:00 UTC of October 13, it was downgraded to a tropical depression by the JTWC, as it started moving westwards because of the presence of a subtropical ridge towards the southeast of the system. Satellite imagery showed that the deep convection had been displaced towards the northeast and the LLCC of the system had become less defined. However at 15:00 UTC of the next day, the JTWC re-upgraded it to a tropical storm, as it entered over warm sea-surface temperatures which allowed the system to maintain its intensity despite high wind shear. Satellite imagery also indicated that it developed subtropical characteristics. Unexpectedly, Namtheun further intensified into a severe tropical storm according to JMA at 06:00 UTC of October 16, and a Category 1-equivalent typhoon according to JTWC at 09:00 UTC of October 16. Satellite imagery depicted that the system had developed a compact core with improved convection structure near its center. It also developed an eye-like feature. The weakening of the vertical wind shear was main reason for the intensification and also the presence of marginally favorable sea-surface temperatures (26–27 °C (79–81 °F)). A few hours later, both JMA and JTWC downgraded to a tropical storm, as its convection had weakened significantly because of further cooling of sea-surface temperatures and strengthening of the wind shear. Namtheun managed its intensity as it continued north-northwards but since it was interacting with the baroclinic zone, it started its extratropical transition between 00:00 and 15:00 UTC. For the next several days, the system moved eastward across the North Pacific, before undergoing explosive intensification and developing into a bomb cyclone on October 21, reaching an extratropical peak of 951 millibars (28.1 inHg), while situated off the coast of the Pacific Northwest. Afterward, the system curved northward and then north-northwestward, while gradually weakening, before being absorbed into another approaching extratropical cyclone from the west, late on October 22. Namtheun's extratropical remnant brought heavy rain and powerful winds to the Pacific Northwest.

=== Typhoon Malou ===
- Typhoon (JMA)
- Category 2 typhoon (SSHWS)
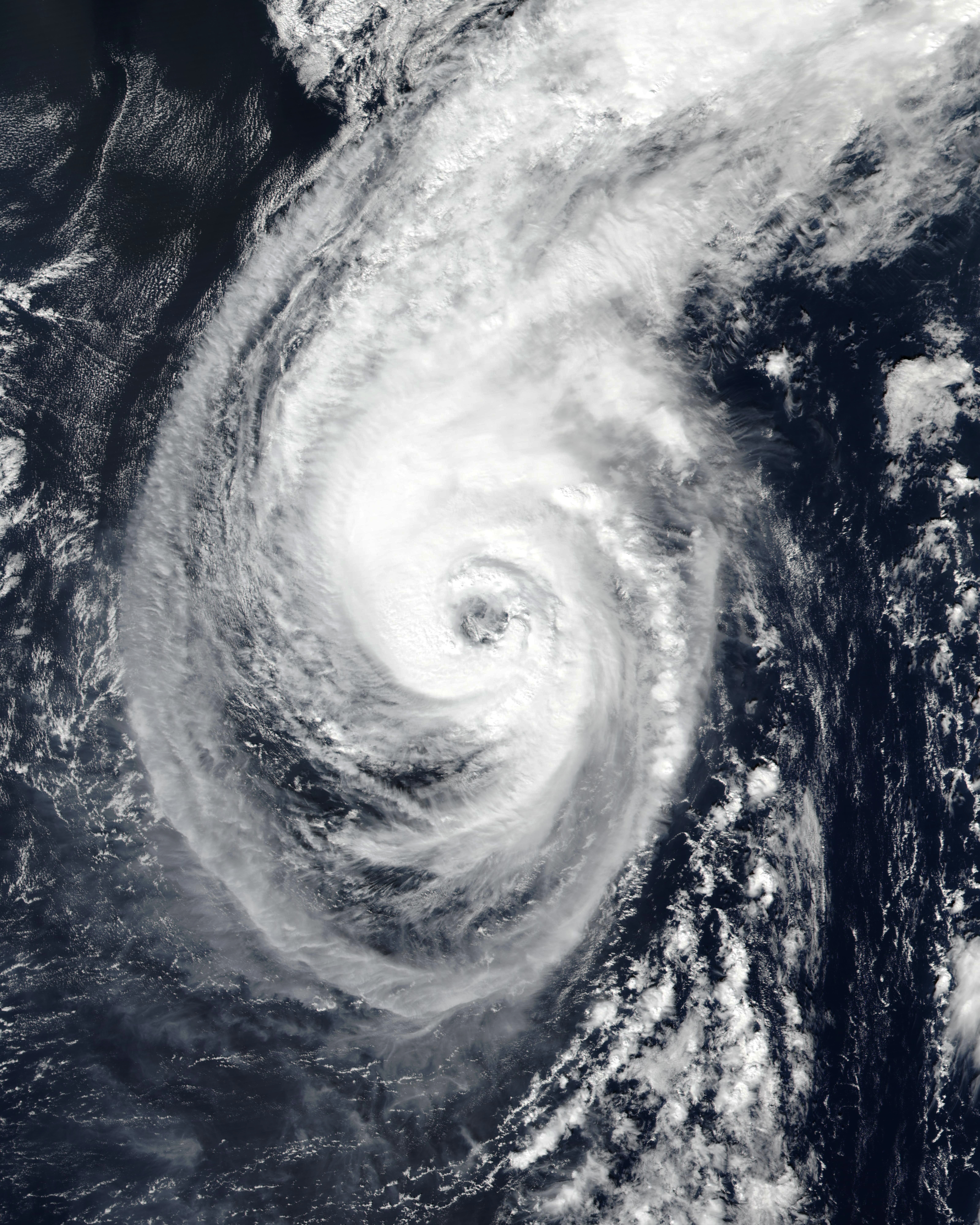
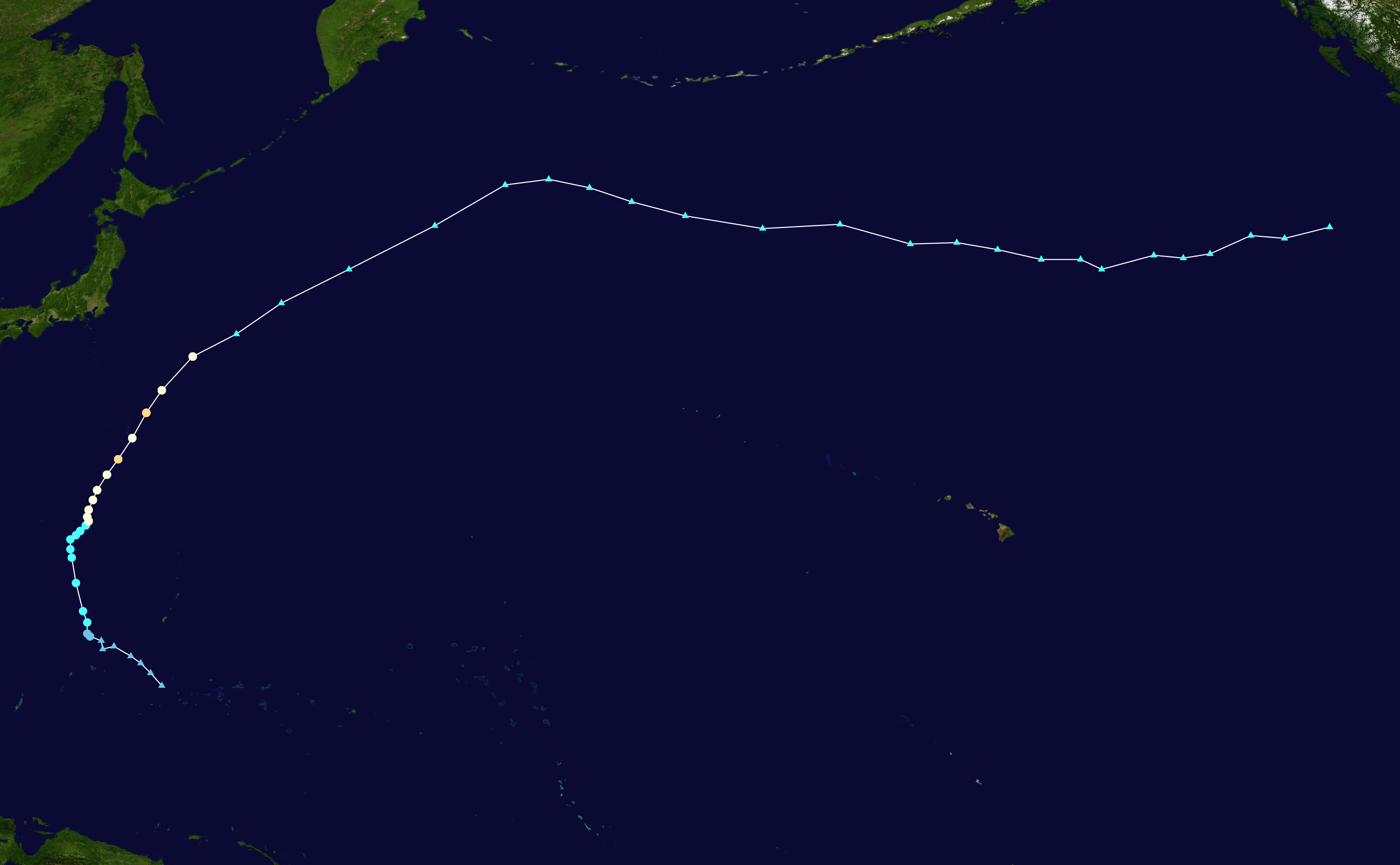
- Duration: October 23 – November 4
- Peak intensity: 140 km/h (85 mph) (10-min); 965 hPa (mbar)

On October 20, the JTWC noted an area of convection approximately 574 nmi (1,063 km; 661 mi) east of Guam. Infrared satellite imagery found that it formed a flaring convection which was displaced to the northwest from the actual center, but at 06:00 UTC the next day, the JTWC discontinued giving advisories to the area of convection, as its convection had completely dissipated. On the same day at 18:00 UTC, the JMA recognized the same area of convection, as a low pressure area. At 15:00 UTC of October 22, the JTWC started giving advisories for the area of convection as it developed sufficient convection and a poorly defined low-level circulation. On the next day at 18:00 UTC, the JMA upgraded it to a tropical depression, and three and a half hour later, the JTWC issued a TCFA. At 03:00 UTC of October 24, the JTWC upgraded to a tropical depression and designated as 25W. Later at 18:00 UTC, the JTWC upgraded it to a tropical storm, as the organization of the convection had increased. Six hours later, the JMA did the same thing and named it Malou. At midday of the next day, the JMA upgraded it to a severe tropical storm. Early on October 27, the JTWC upgraded it to a Category 1-equivalent typhoon, as it developed an eye-like feature wrapped around a ragged spiral bandings. At 18:00 UTC the same day, the JMA upgraded it to a typhoon. Malou continued to intensify while moving north-northeastward. On October 28, it reached its peak intensity, with the JMA estimating maximum sustained winds of 140 km/h (85 mph) and a minimum central pressure of 965 hPa (28.50 inHg). At 06:00 UTC, it reached its peak intensity according to the JMA while located south-southwest of the Ogasawara Islands. Malou subsequently began weakening as it accelerated northeastward over cooler waters and encountered increasing vertical wind shear. On October 29, the JMA declared that Malou had transitioned into an extratropical cyclone east of Japan. The extratropical cyclone continued moving northeastward before turning east-southeastward late on October 30 while east of the Kuril Islands. It crossed the International Date Line on October 31 and continued eastward across the North Pacific. The system persisted as an extratropical cyclone before its original center dissipated on November 4.

=== Tropical Depression 26W ===
- Tropical depression (JMA)
- Tropical depression (SSHWS)
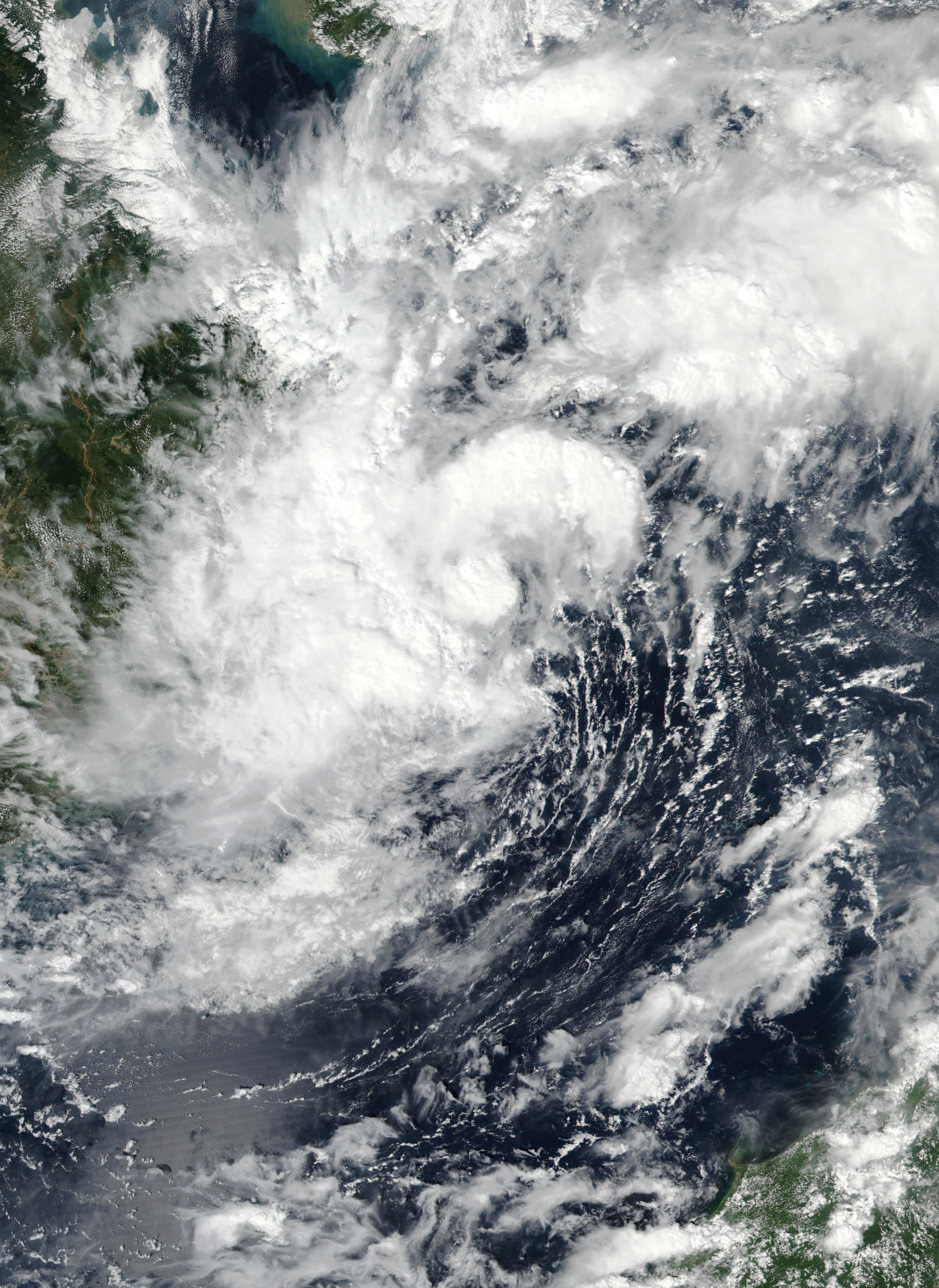
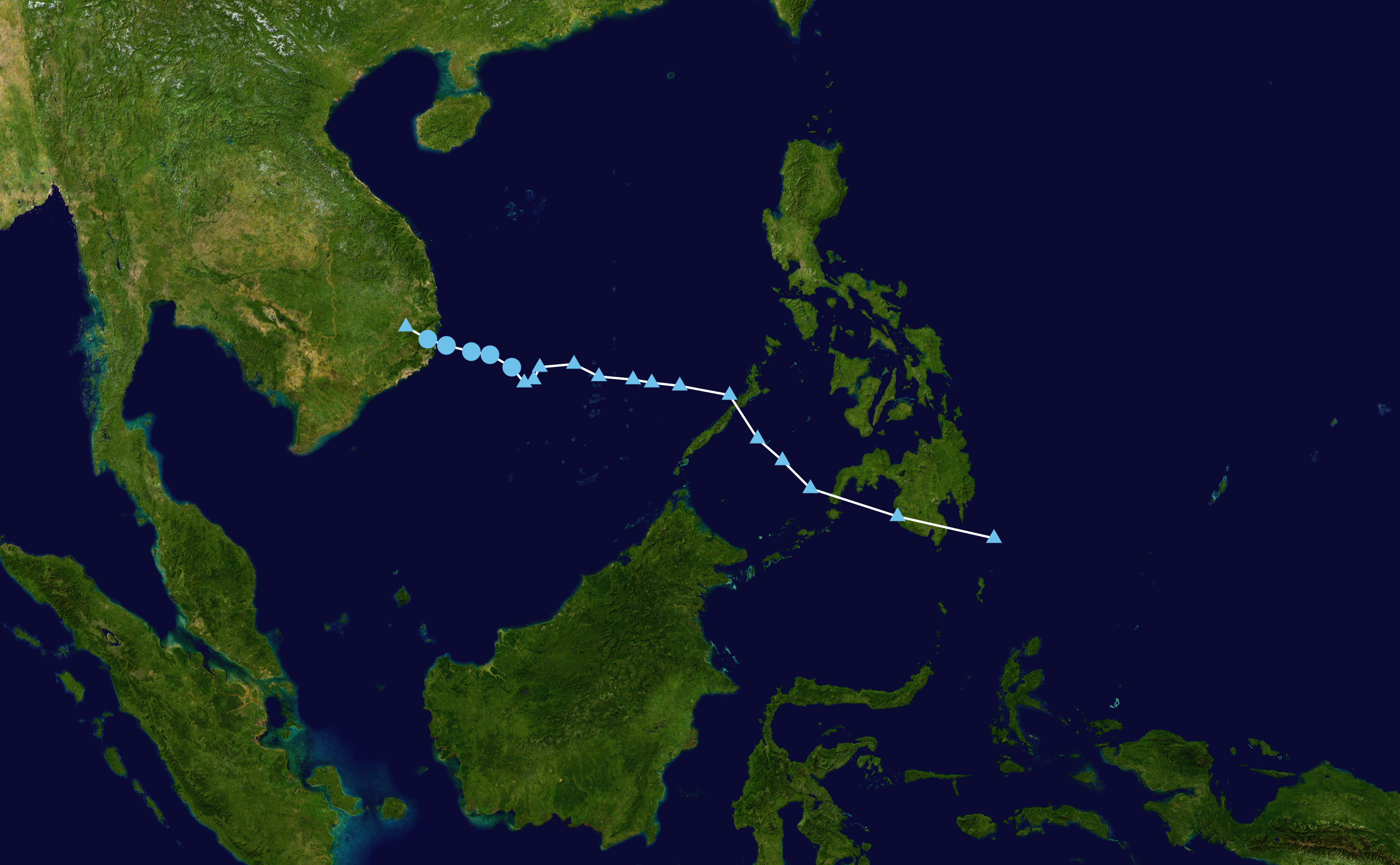
- Duration: October 24 – October 27
- Peak intensity: <55 km/h (35 mph) (10-min); 1004 hPa (mbar)

At 00:00 UTC of October 22, the JMA noted the formation of a low-pressure area east of Mindanao. Two days later at 06:00 UTC, the JMA upgraded it to a tropical depression as it was located off the coast of the island of Palawan. On the same day, the JTWC noted the same low pressure area and gave a low chance of formation, which was later upgraded to medium. At 05:30 UTC of October 25, the JTWC issued a TCFA for the system, as its convection had improved and developed a weakly defined LLCC. On the next day, after re-issuing the TCFA at 05:00 UTC, the JTWC upgraded it to a tropical depression at 09:00 UTC as it was located off the coast of Vietnam. Satellite imagery found that its LLCC had become defined however the convective structure continued to remain disorganized. Between 15:00 UTC of October 26 and 03:00 UTC of October 27, the system made landfall near Nha Trang and at 03:00 UTC, the JTWC issued its final advisory as its convection had rapidly disorganized after landfall, as it moved over the mountainous terrain of Vietnam.

Over 50,000 sea vehicles with over 261,000 people in it were already informed on the brewing system and its path, according to a meeting about the depression on October 25. Over 3,200 officer soldiers and 270 public vehicles were also put on standby. The areas between Thừa Thiên Huế and Khánh Hòa received heavy rainfall from the system. Total damage of the flooding associated with 26W was 328 billion VND (US$14.4 million).

=== Typhoon Nyatoh ===
- Very strong typhoon (JMA)
- Category 4 super typhoon (SSHWS)
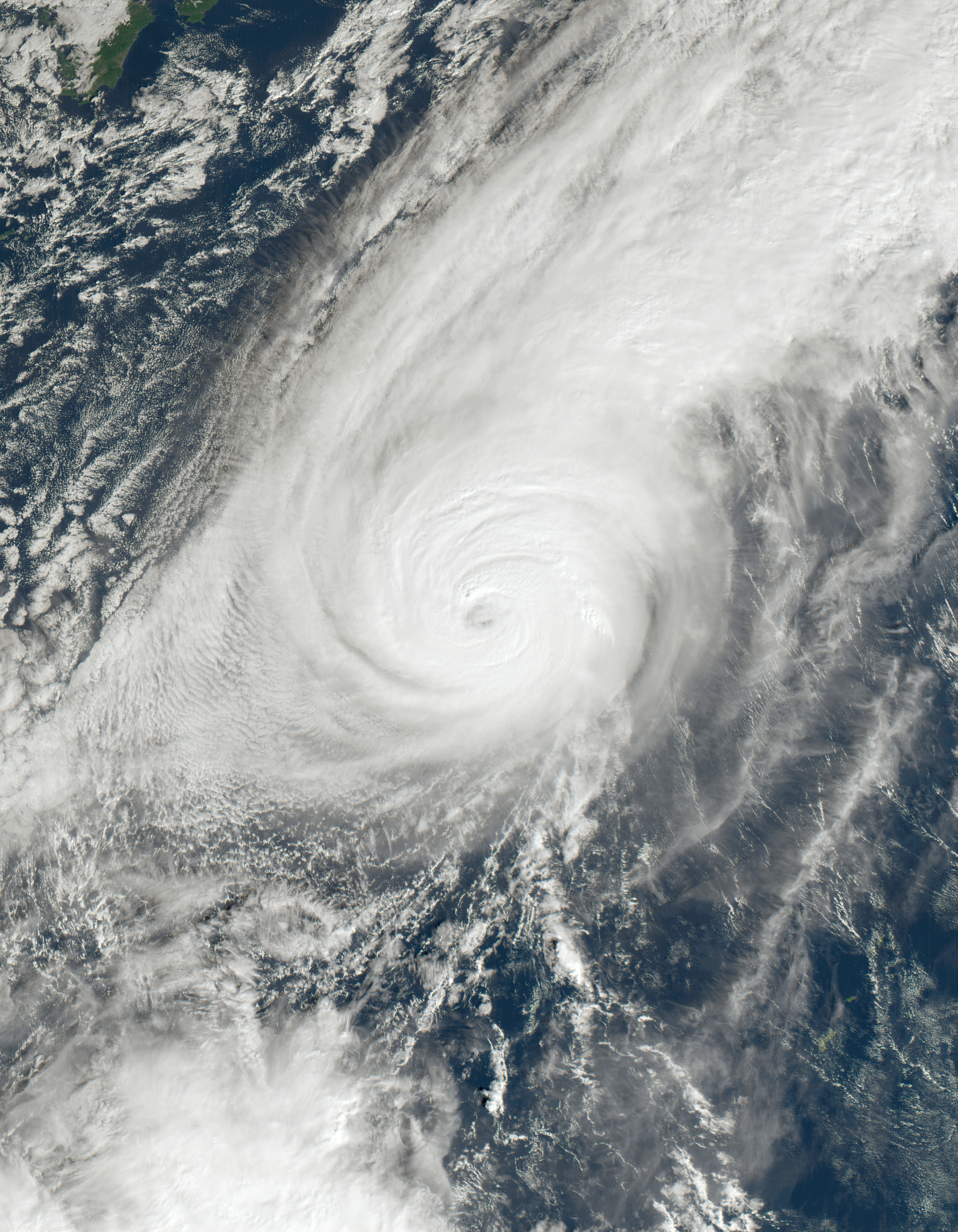
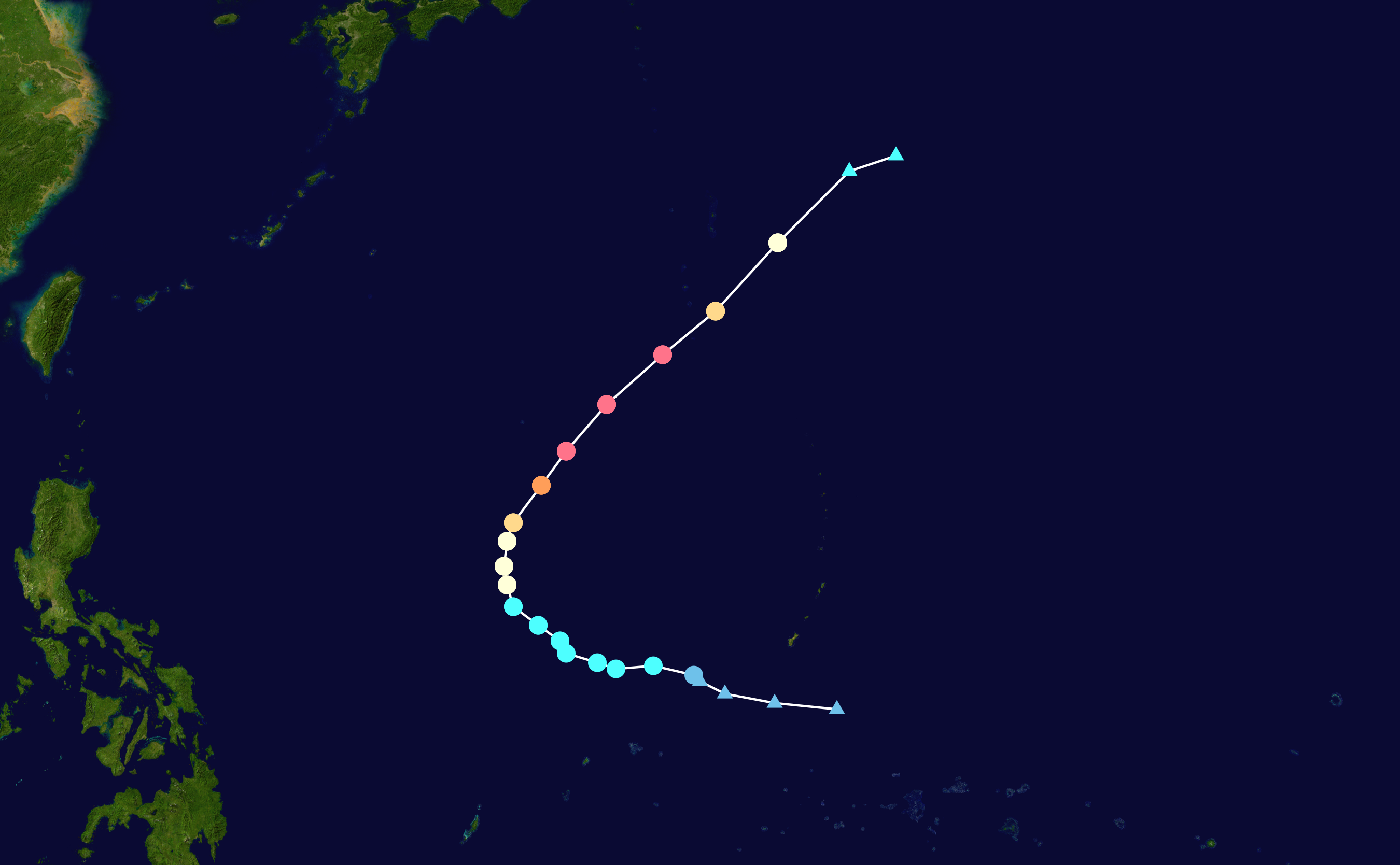
- Duration: November 28 – December 3
- Peak intensity: 185 km/h (115 mph) (10-min); 925 hPa (mbar)

Early of November 26, the JTWC noted the formation of an area of convection located 752 nmi (1,393 km; 865 mi) east-southeast of Guam. On the next day, the JMA recognized the same system as a low pressure area. At 06:00 UTC of November 28, the JTWC issued a TCFA as it developed a poorly defined center, and by midnight of November 28, the JMA upgraded the system to a tropical depression. The JTWC followed suit and designated it as 27W at 15:00 UTC the same day. Six hours later, the JTWC further upgraded it to a tropical storm. At midnight of the next day, the JMA followed suit and named it as Nyatoh. On 00:00 UTC of December 1, the JMA further upgraded it to a severe tropical storm. Fifteen hours later, the JTWC declared it a typhoon and upgraded it to a Category 1-equivalent status, as Nyatoh developed an eye according to microwave imagery. The JMA followed suit at 18:00 UTC. By 03:00 UTC the next day, it further intensified into a Category 2-equivalent typhoon as it briefly formed a ragged eye. Later that day, Nyatoh unexpectedly rapidly intensified to a Category 4-equivalent super typhoon due to jet interaction. It later reached peak intensity with 10-minute sustained winds of 185 km/h (115 mph) and a pressure of 925 mb (27.32 inHg). However, this peak was short-lived as strong wind shear, dry air, and cooler sea surface temperatures shredded the system apart and rapidly weakened to a Category 1-equivalent typhoon at 18:00 UTC. On December 4 at 06:35 UTC, the JMA declared Nyatoh a remnant low.

=== Typhoon Rai (Odette) ===
- Violent typhoon (JMA)
- Category 5 super typhoon (SSHWS)
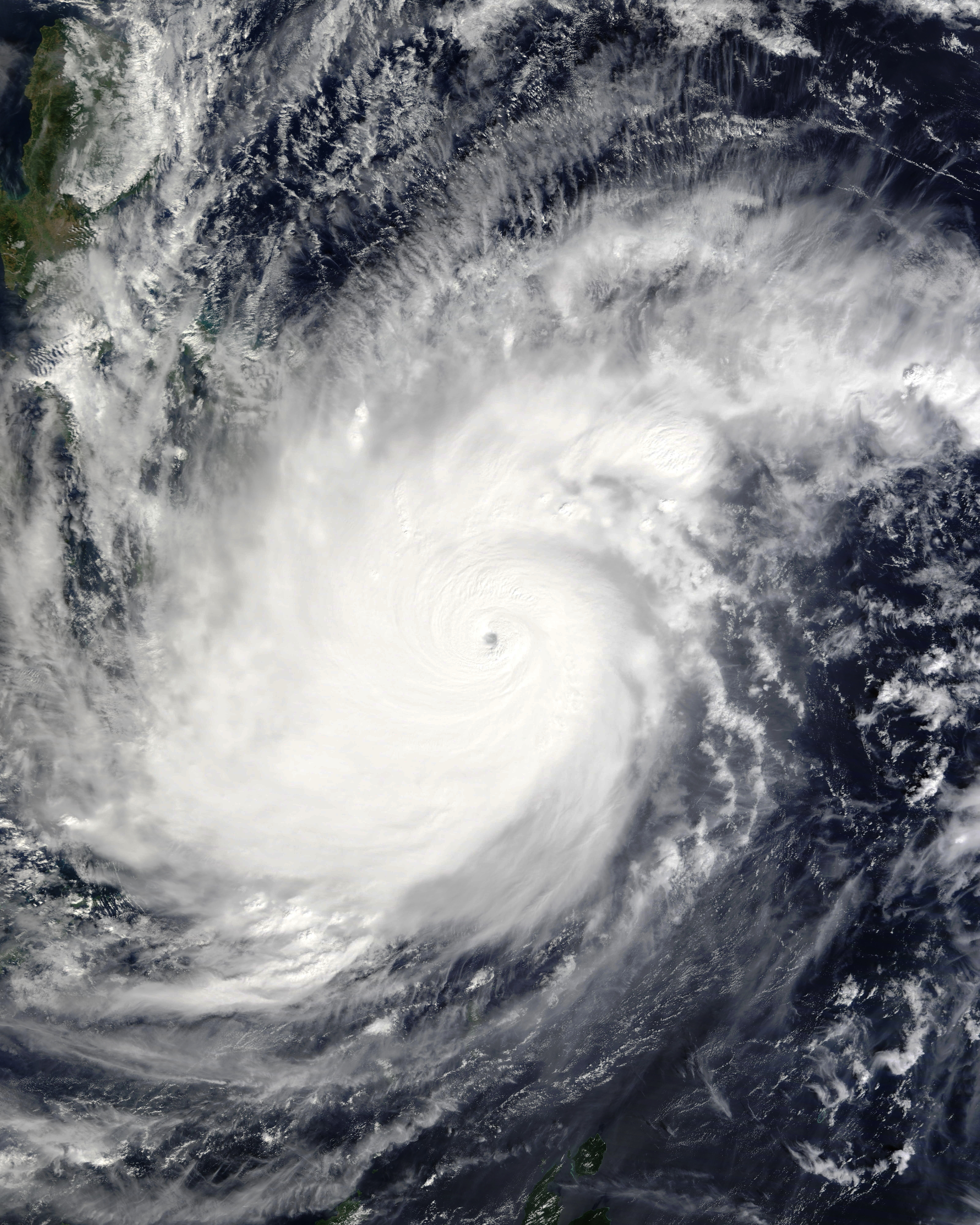
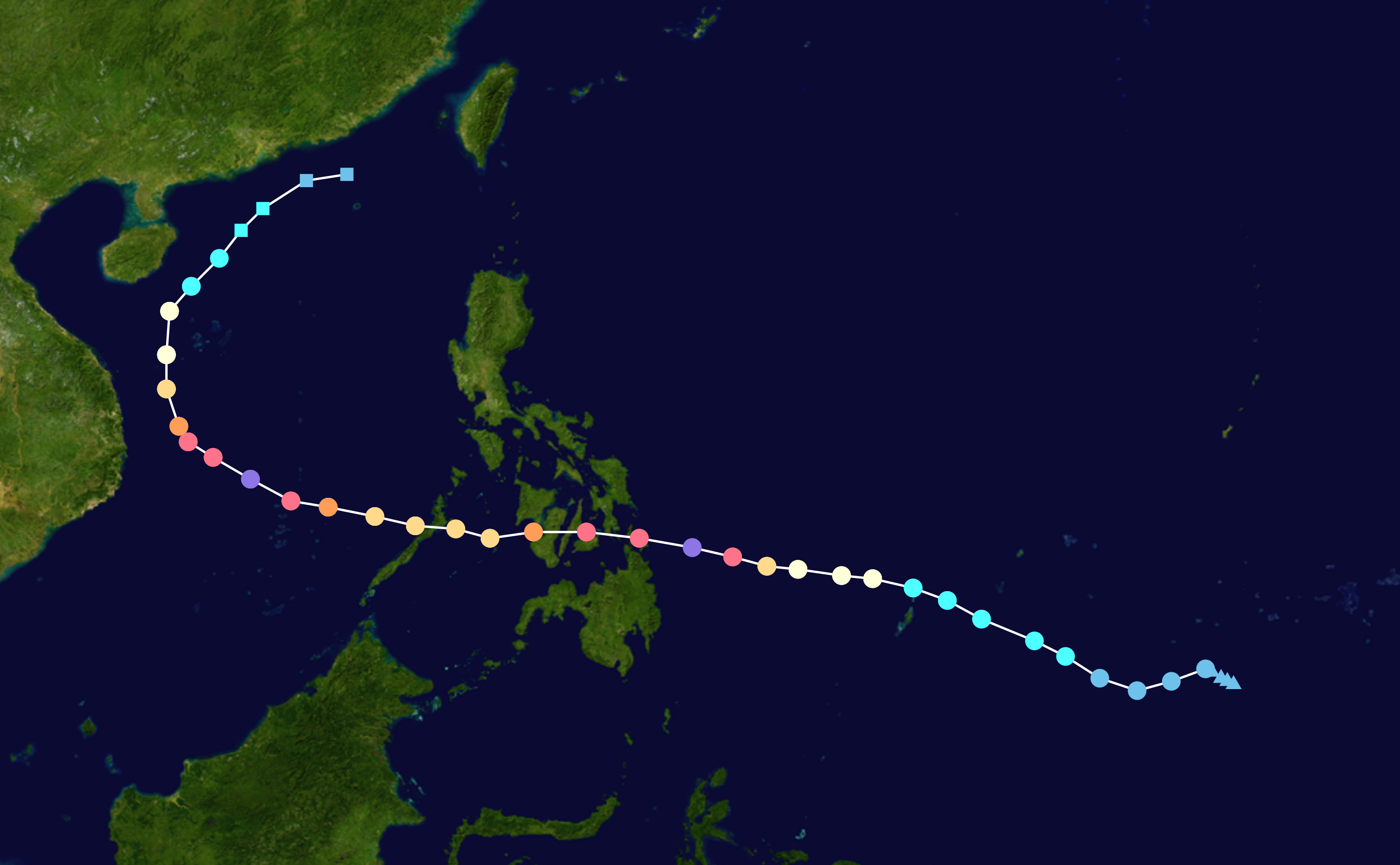
- Duration: December 11 – December 21
- Peak intensity: 195 km/h (120 mph) (10-min); 915 hPa (mbar)

At 00:00 UTC of December 12, the JMA noted the existence of a tropical depression in the vicinity of the Caroline Islands. Two hours later, the JTWC issued a TCFA for the developing system, noting a "promising" environment for further development. On the next day, the JMA upgraded the system into a tropical storm and gave it the international name, Rai.

The PAGASA issued its first tropical cyclone advisory for the developing storm on December 12. Warnings for Palau and the Federated States of Micronesia were issued by the Guam National Weather Service by December 13. On the next day, Rai continued intensifying, and the Japan Meteorological Agency upgraded it to a severe tropical storm.

Rai then entered the Philippine Area of Responsibility on December 14 and was given the name Odette by the PAGASA. The PAGASA raised Tropical Cyclone Wind Signal #1 over parts of Eastern Visayas and Northern Mindanao. Later that same day, the JMA upgraded Rai to a typhoon. The PAGASA and the JTWC later followed suit and also upgraded Rai to a typhoon. Rai then rapidly intensified overnight, becoming a Category 5-equivalent super typhoon on the morning of December 16.

Rai then made its first landfall on General Luna, Surigao del Norte at 1:30PM PHT. A few minutes later, it struck Cagdianao, Dinagat Island. It then made a third landfall in Liloan, Southern Leyte. It continued to cross the islands and later struck Padre Burgos, Southern Leyte and President Carlos P. Garcia, Bohol. It then soon struck Bien Unido, Bohol. It lost super typhoon intensity and then struck Carcar, Cebu. It made an eighth landfall on La Libertad, Negros Oriental. It made a final landfall in Roxas, Palawan. The system then left the PAR by 12:40 PHT (04:40 UTC). For the first time since Typhoon Rammasun in 2014 and the third after Pamela of 1954 and the aforementioned storm, Rai unexpectedly attained Category 5-equivalent super typhoon status in the South China Sea, due to the favorable environment in that region, at 21:00 UTC on December 18, as it underwent a secondary period of rapid intensification.

By 03:00 UTC the next day, Rai again weakened below Category 5-equivalent super typhoon intensity, while turning in a west-northwesterly direction. Its eye was cloud-filled by this time, with the storm rapidly weakening afterward.

As of January 6, 2022, 410 fatalities have been reported, with 111 alone being located in Bohol. On March 23, PAGASA revised their tropical cyclone scale. Rai (Odette) was considered as a super typhoon.

=== Tropical Depression 29W ===
- Tropical depression (JMA)
- Tropical depression (SSHWS)
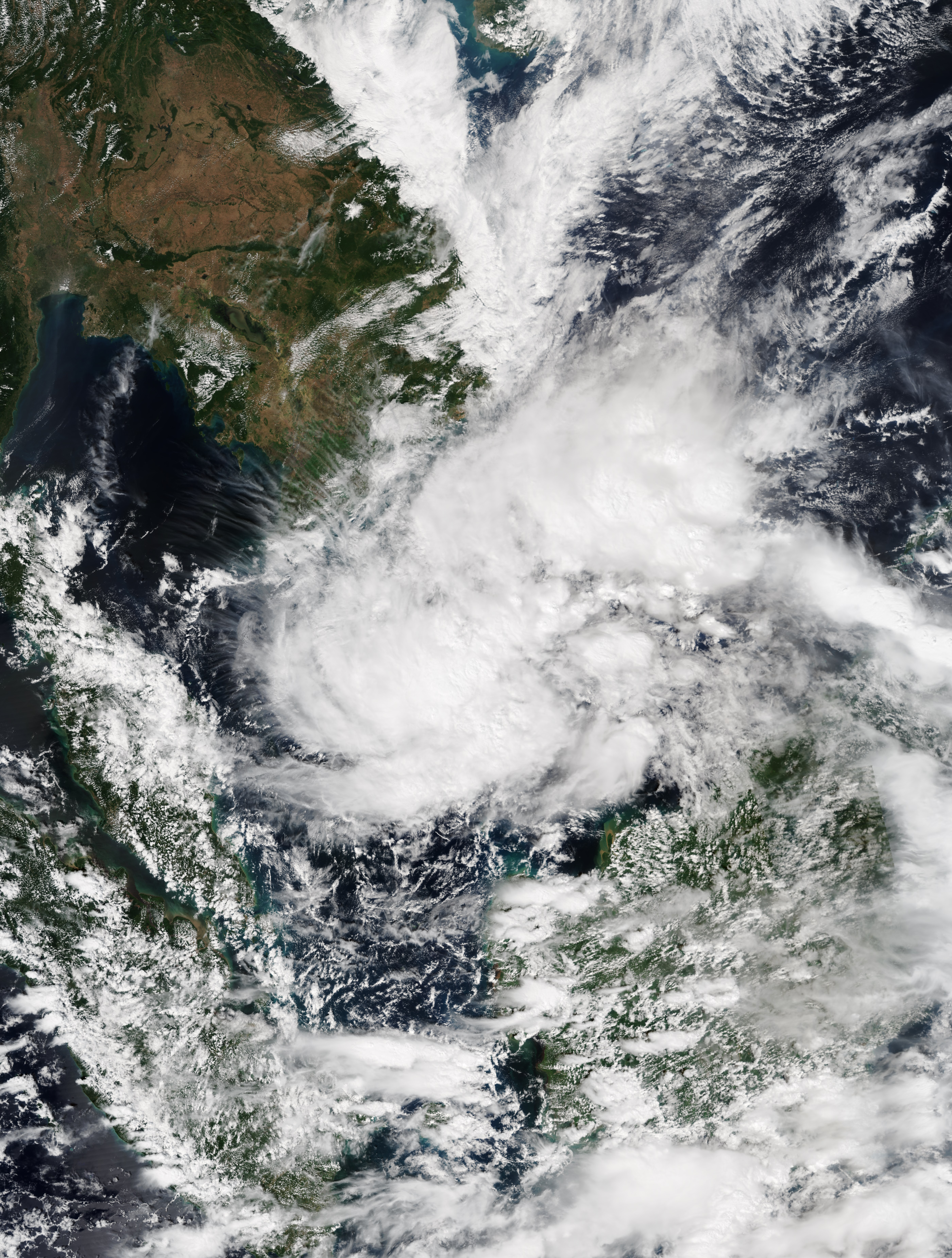
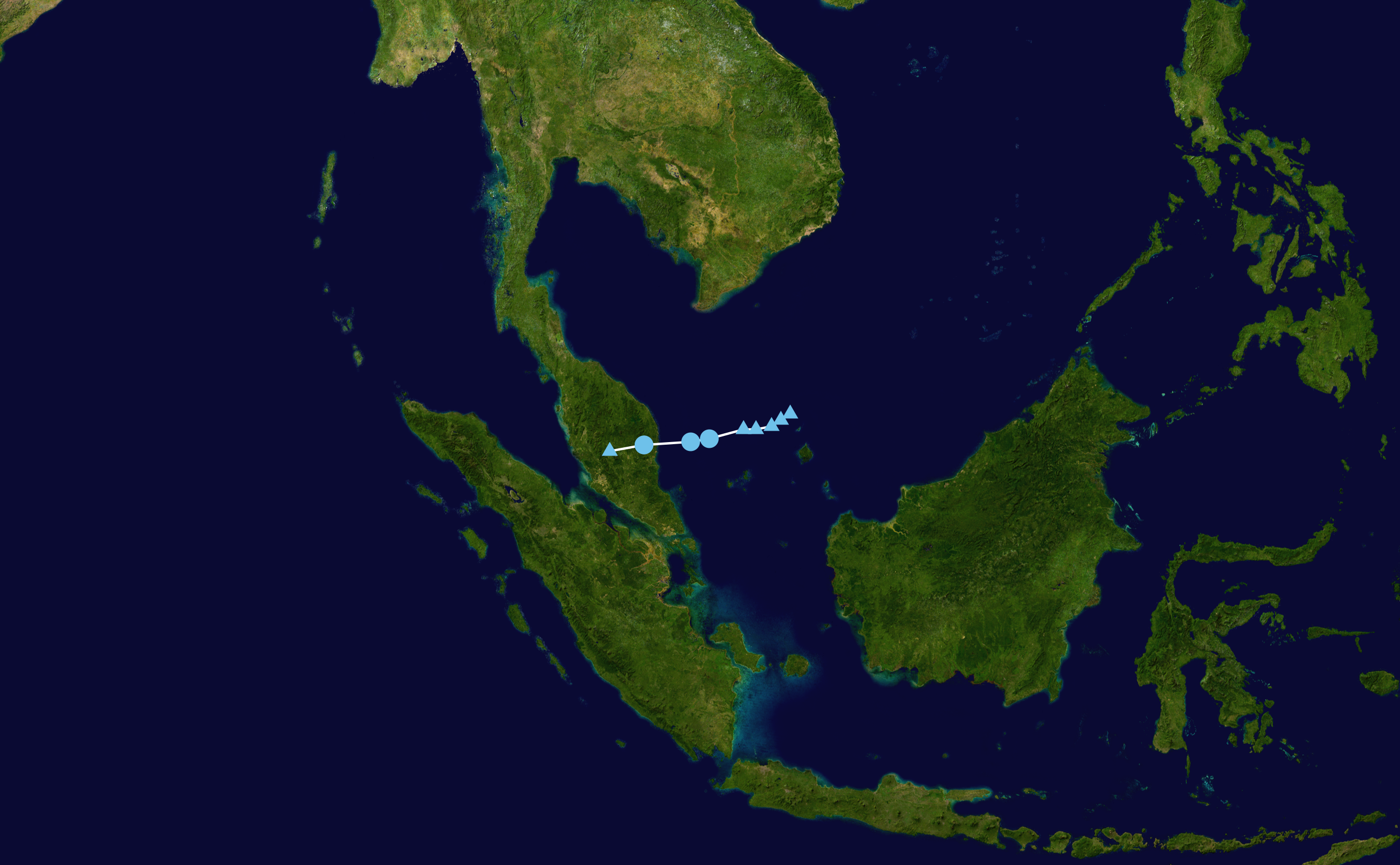
- Duration: December 13 – December 17
- Peak intensity: <55 km/h (35 mph) (10-min); 1006 hPa (mbar)

On December 14, the JMA upgraded a westward-moving low-pressure area to a tropical depression. The JTWC began monitoring the system by the next day, noting the presence of a consolidated low-level circulation within the system. The system's chances of developing into a tropical cyclone slowly increased, and on December 16 at 17:30 UTC, the JTWC issued a TCFA for the system despite the outflow of Typhoon Rai partially exposing the system's low-level circulation. By 21:00 UTC, the JTWC upgraded the system to a tropical depression, assigning it the designation 29W as it continued over marginally favorable developmental conditions. Shortly after, at 23:00 UTC, the depression made landfall north of Kuantan and began to weaken, prompting the JTWC to issue its final advisory on the system by the next day. The JMA stopped monitoring the system on December 17 at 12:00 UTC.

After passing through Peninsular Malaysia, it reached the Straits of Malacca as a low-pressure system. Persistent and continuous heavy rains for more than 24 hours began on December 17, causing the worst flooding in Central Malaysia since 2014. Floods were also reported in the states of Kelantan, Terengganu, Pahang, Perak, Negeri Sembilan and Malacca.

=== Other systems ===
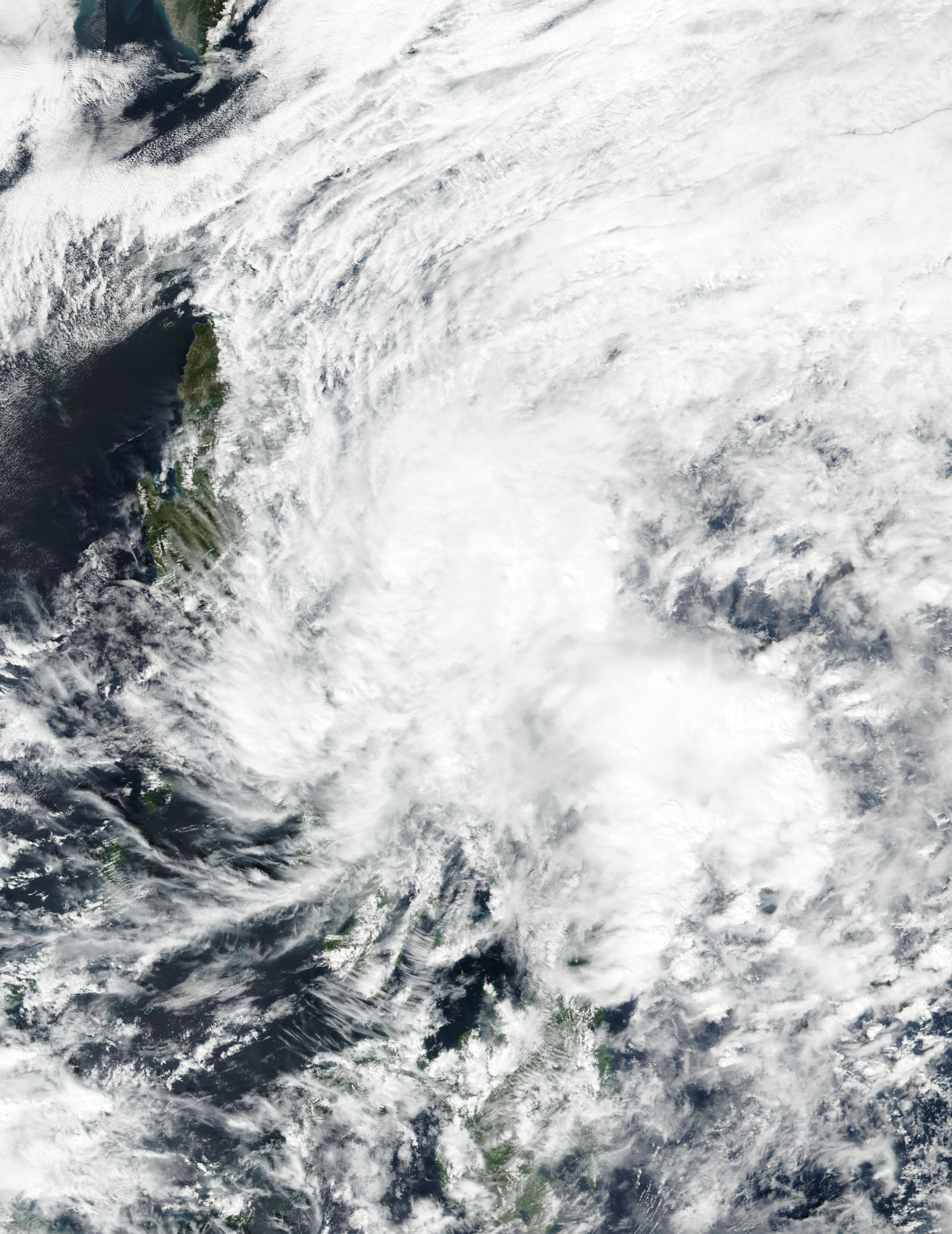
A tropical depression on January 19

- During January 19, the JMA reported that a tropical depression had developed to the east of Luzon, Philippines. The precursor to the depression brought scattered showers and thunderstorms to Mindanao, Palawan, and Visayas on January 18. The JMA, however, discontinued advisories for the system on the next day. The depression also brought stormy weather to Luzon on January 20. The PAGASA warned residents of possible flash flooding and mudslides due to heavy rainfall. The system's precursor was associated with a frontal system, with its combined effects bringing heavy rainfall over much of Visayas, the Bicol Region, and Northern Mindanao, resulting in three deaths and agricultural damages of up to ₱642.5 million (US$13.2 million).
- On March 9, a low-pressure area entered the Philippine Area of Responsibility, though it was not expected to develop at that time. On March 14, the low-pressure area intensified into a tropical depression over the Sulu Sea before quickly degenerating back into a low-pressure area. The system brought light to moderate rains over parts of the Philippines, with the PAGASA advising residents of the possibility of floods and landslides.
- On May 29, the JTWC issued a TCFA for a tropical disturbance that was roughly 622 nautical miles (1,152 km; 716 mi) to the southeast of Guam, near the Nomoi Islands. The system gradually developed as it was experiencing warm sea surface temperatures and low vertical wind shear. On the next day at 00:00 UTC, the JMA recognized the system as a tropical depression. On the same day, the JTWC cancelled the TCFA for the system as its structure degraded, with the JMA last recognizing the system as a tropical depression on June 1 at 18:00 UTC.
- On June 29, an area of convection formed 425 nmi (787 km; 489 mi) from Guam with satellite imagery revealing that the system had a deep convection with a weak low level circulation. Within a favorable environments with low-to-moderate wind shear, and warm sea surface temperatures, the system gradually became more organized with a more defined low level circulation. On June 30, the JTWC issued a TCFA for the system. On July 1, animated multispectral satellite imagery indicated a very broad and ill-defined low level circulation with convection being sheared to the south-southwest of the disturbance, which prompted the JTWC to cancel the system's TCFA and downgrade its development chances within the next day to low. The JMA no longer considered it a tropical depression in their tropical disturbance summary advisories on the same day.
- On July 19, at 00:00 UTC, a tropical depression formed near 29°N 164°E, which was moving northwards at the speed of 10 kn (20 km/h; 10 mph), according to the JMA. It lasted for two days until July 21, when it became a remnant low at 00:00 UTC.
- On July 28, at 00:00 UTC, the JMA noted a tropical depression near 29°N 152°E, which was moving northwards slowly.
- On July 30, at 00:00 UTC, the JMA noted a tropical depression near 28°N 142°E, which was moving northwestward slowly.
- On July 31, a tropical depression formed over the open Pacific at 18:00 UTC. By August 1, at 05:30 UTC, the JTWC issued a TCFA for the system as it had an exposed low-level circulation with persistent disorganized convection. The agency canceled the alert on the next day as it had little remaining convection and it had moved over cooler waters.
- On August 1, at 18:00 UTC, JMA noted a tropical depression near Taiwan.
- On September 1, the JMA designated a tropical depression near Wake Island. The JTWC first assessed it as a subtropical depression, before reclassifying it as Tropical Depression 17W on September 2. The circulation was well-defined but exposed from the convection, due to dry air and wind shear. The JMA ceased advisories on September 4.
- The JMA began tracking a tropical depression that had formed to the east of Hainan on September 7. The system moved westward towards Vietnam and was last noted the next day.
- On September 27 of 06:00 UTC, the JMA noted the formation of a low-pressure area located to the east of Typhoon Mindulle. The JMA later upgraded it to a tropical depression, six hours later. At 01:00 UTC the next day, the JTWC recognized the system and gave a medium chance of formation.
- On October 7, a tropical depression formed north of Palau, which was embedded in the same monsoonal circulation of what would become Tropical Storm Kompasu. PAGASA designated the depression as Nando. On October 8, the depression merged with the other system.

== Storm names ==
Within the Northwest Pacific Ocean, both the Japan Meteorological Agency (JMA) and the Philippine Atmospheric, Geophysical and Astronomical Services Administration (PAGASA) assign names to tropical cyclones that develop in the Western Pacific, which can result in a tropical cyclone having two names. The Japan Meteorological Agency's RSMC Tokyo — Typhoon Center assigns international names to tropical cyclones on behalf of the World Meteorological Organization's Typhoon Committee, should they be judged to have 10-minute sustained windspeeds of 65 km/h (40 mph). PAGASA names to tropical cyclones which move into or form as a tropical depression in their area of responsibility located between 135°E and 115°E and between 5°N and 25°N even if the cyclone has had an international name assigned to it. The names of significant tropical cyclones are retired, by both PAGASA and the Typhoon Committee. Should the list of names for the Philippine region be exhausted then names will be taken from an auxiliary list of which the first ten are published each season. Unused names are marked in gray.

=== International names ===
During the season, 22 tropical storms developed in the Western Pacific and each one was named by the JMA, when the system was judged to have 10-minute sustained windspeeds of 65 kilometres per hour (40 mph). The JMA selected the names from a list of 140 names, that had been developed by the 14 members nations and territories of the ESCAP/WMO Typhoon Committee. During the season, the names Surigae, Koguma, Cempaka and Nyatoh were used for the first time after they replaced Mujigae, Koppu, Melor and Meranti, which were retired following the 2015 and 2016 seasons.

Dujuan	Surigae	Choi-wan	Koguma	Champi	In-fa	Cempaka	Nepartak	Lupit	Mirinae	Nida
Omais	Conson	Chanthu	Dianmu	Mindulle	Lionrock	Kompasu	Namtheun	Malou	Nyatoh	Rai

==== Retirement ====
At their 55th Session in March 2023, the ESCAP/WMO Typhoon Committee announced that the names Conson, Kompasu, and Rai would be removed from the naming lists due to the number of deaths and cost of damages each one caused, and they will not be used again for another typhoon name. In 2024, they were replaced by Luc-Binh, Tokei, and Sarbul, respectively.

=== Philippines ===
Main list
Auring	Bising	Crising	Dante	Emong
Fabian	Gorio	Huaning	Isang	Jolina
Kiko	Lannie	Maring	Nando	Odette
Paolo (unused)	Quedan (unused)	Ramil (unused)	Salome (unused)	Tino (unused)
Uwan (unused)	Verbena (unused)	Wilma (unused)	Yasmin (unused)	Zoraida (unused)
Auxiliary list
Alamid (unused)	Bruno (unused)	Conching (unused)	Dolor (unused)	Ernie (unused)
Florante (unused)	Gerardo (unused)	Hernan (unused)	Isko (unused)	Jerome (unused)

During the season, PAGASA used its own naming scheme for the 15 tropical cyclones that either developed within or moved into their self-defined area of responsibility. This is the same list used during the 2017 season and are scheduled to be used again during 2025, except for Uwan and Verbena, which replaced Urduja and Vinta, respectively. No new names were used for the first time this year.

==== Retirement ====
After the season, on March 21, 2022, PAGASA removed the names Jolina, Maring and Odette from its rotating naming lists due to the number of deaths and amount of damages individually attributed to them. They will never be used for another typhoon name. They were replaced with Jacinto, Mirasol and Opong for the 2025 season.

== Season effects ==
This table summarizes all the systems that developed within or moved into the North Pacific Ocean, to the west of the International Date Line during 2021. The tables also provide an overview of a systems intensity, duration, land areas affected and any deaths or damages associated with the system.

Name	Dates	Peak intensity			Areas affected	Damage (USD)	Deaths	Ref(s).
Name	Dates	Category	Wind speed	Pressure	Areas affected	Damage (USD)	Deaths	Ref(s).
TD	January 19 – 20	Tropical depression	Not specified	1008 hPa (29.77 inHg)	Philippines	$13.2 million	3	
Dujuan (Auring)	February 16 – 23	Tropical storm	75 km/h (45 mph)	996 hPa (29.41 inHg)	Palau, Philippines	$3.29 million	1	
TD	March 14	Tropical depression	Not specified	1006 hPa (29.71 inHg)	Philippines	None	None	
Surigae (Bising)	April 12 – 24	Violent typhoon	220 km/h (140 mph)	895 hPa (26.43 inHg)	Caroline Islands, Palau, Sulawesi, Philippines	$10.5 million	10	
03W (Crising)	May 12 – 14	Tropical depression	55 km/h (35 mph)	1002 hPa (29.59 inHg)	Philippines	$486,000	None	
Choi-wan (Dante)	May 29 – June 5	Tropical storm	75 km/h (45 mph)	998 hPa (29.47 inHg)	Palau, Philippines, Taiwan, Japan	$6.39 million	11	
TD	May 30 – 31	Tropical depression	Not specified	1006 hPa (29.71 inHg)	None	None	None	
Koguma	June 11 – 13	Tropical storm	65 km/h (40 mph)	996 hPa (29.41 inHg)	South China, Vietnam, Laos	$12.9 million	1	
Champi	June 20 – 27	Typhoon	120 km/h (75 mph)	980 hPa (28.94 inHg)	Mariana Islands	None	None	
TD	June 30	Tropical depression	Not specified	1008 hPa (29.77 inHg)	None	None	None	
07W (Emong)	July 3 – 6	Tropical depression	55 km/h (35 mph)	1004 hPa (29.65 inHg)	Philippines, Taiwan	None	None	
08W	July 5 – 8	Tropical depression	55 km/h (35 mph)	1000 hPa (29.53 inHg)	Philippines, Southern China, Vietnam	None	None	
In-fa (Fabian)	July 15 – 29	Very strong typhoon	155 km/h (100 mph)	950 hPa (28.05 inHg)	Philippines, Ryukyu Islands, Taiwan, China	$2.04 billion	6	
Cempaka	July 17 – 25	Typhoon	130 km/h (80 mph)	980 hPa (28.94 inHg)	South China, Vietnam	$4.25 million	3	
TD	July 19 – 20	Tropical depression	Not specified	1012 hPa (29.88 inHg)	None	None	None	
Nepartak	July 22 – 28	Tropical storm	75 km/h (45 mph)	990 hPa (29.23 inHg)	Japan	None	None	
TD	July 28 – 29	Tropical depression	Not specified	1004 hPa (29.65 inHg)	None	None	None	
TD	July 30 – August 1	Tropical depression	Not specified	998 hPa (29.47 inHg)	Japan	None	None	
TD	July 31 – August 3	Tropical depression	55 km/h (35 mph)	998 hPa (29.47 inHg)	None	None	None	
TD	August 1 – 3	Tropical depression	Not specified	996 hPa (29.41 inHg)	Ryukyu Islands, Taiwan	None	None	
12W	August 2 – 6	Tropical depression	55 km/h (35 mph)	1000 hPa (29.53 inHg)	Japan	None	None	
Lupit (Huaning)	August 2 – 9	Tropical storm	85 km/h (50 mph)	984 hPa (29.06 inHg)	Vietnam, Southern China, Taiwan, Japan	$217 million	6	
Mirinae (Gorio)	August 3 – 10	Severe tropical storm	95 km/h (60 mph)	980 hPa (28.94 inHg)	Japan, Western Canada	None	None	
Nida	August 3 – 8	Severe tropical storm	100 km/h (65 mph)	992 hPa (29.29 inHg)	Alaska	None	None	
Omais (Isang)	August 10 – 23	Tropical storm	85 km/h (50 mph)	994 hPa (29.35 inHg)	Marshall Islands, Micronesia, Mariana Islands, Ryukyu Islands, South Korea	$13 million	None	
17W	September 1 – 4	Tropical depression	55 km/h (35 mph)	1008 hPa (29.77 inHg)	None	None	None	
Conson (Jolina)	September 5 – 13	Severe tropical storm	95 km/h (60 mph)	992 hPa (29.29 inHg)	Philippines, Vietnam	$107 million	25	
Chanthu (Kiko)	September 5 – 18	Violent typhoon	215 km/h (130 mph)	905 hPa (26.72 inHg)	Philippines, Taiwan, Eastern China, South Korea, Japan	$30 million	None	
TD	September 7 – 8	Tropical depression	Not specified	1004 hPa (29.65 inHg)	Vietnam	None	None	
Mindulle	September 22 – October 2	Violent typhoon	195 km/h (120 mph)	920 hPa (27.17 inHg)	Mariana Islands, Japan, Russian Far East	Minimal	None	
Dianmu	September 22 – 25	Tropical storm	65 km/h (40 mph)	1000 hPa (29.53 inHg)	Vietnam, Laos, Cambodia	Unknown	8	
TD	September 27 – October 2	Tropical depression	Not specified	1004 hPa (29.65 inHg)	None	None	None	
Lionrock (Lannie)	October 5 – 10	Tropical storm	65 km/h (40 mph)	994 hPa (29.35 inHg)	Philippines, Southern China, Vietnam	$47 million	6	
Kompasu (Maring)	October 7 – 14	Severe tropical storm	100 km/h (65 mph)	975 hPa (28.79 inHg)	Philippines, Taiwan, South China, Vietnam	$545 million	44	
Nando	October 7 – 8	Tropical depression	Not specified	1002 hPa (29.59 inHg)	None	None	None	
Namtheun	October 8 – 16	Severe tropical storm	95 km/h (60 mph)	996 hPa (29.41 inHg)	Pacific Northwest, Alaska	None	None	
Malou	October 23 – 29	Typhoon	140 km/h (85 mph)	965 hPa (28.50 inHg)	Bonin Islands	None	None	
26W	October 24 – 27	Tropical depression	Not specified	1004 hPa (29.65 inHg)	Philippines, Vietnam	None	None	
Nyatoh	November 28 – December 3	Very strong typhoon	185 km/h (115 mph)	925 hPa (27.32 inHg)	Bonin Islands	None	None	
Rai (Odette)	December 11 – 21	Violent typhoon	195 km/h (120 mph)	915 hPa (27.02 inHg)	Caroline Islands, Palau, Indonesia, Philippines, Vietnam, Southern China	$968 million	410	
29W	December 13 – 17	Tropical depression	Not specified	1006 hPa (29.71 inHg)	Malaysia	$70 million	54	
Season aggregates
41 systems	January 19 – December 21, 2021		220 km/h (140 mph)	895 hPa (26.43 inHg)		$4.14 billion	579	

== See also ==
- Weather of 2021
- Tropical cyclones in 2021
- Pacific typhoon season
- 2021 Atlantic hurricane season
- 2021 Pacific hurricane season
- 2021 North Indian Ocean cyclone season
- South-West Indian Ocean cyclone seasons: 2020–21, 2021–22
- Australian region cyclone seasons: 2020–21, 2021–22
- South Pacific cyclone seasons: 2020–21, 2021–22
