= MVC =

MVC may refer to:

== Science and technology ==
- Maximum-value composite procedure, an imaging procedure
- Multivariable calculus, a concept in mathematics
- Multivariable control, a concept in process engineering
- Mechanical vapor compression, a desalination technology by distillation

=== Computing ===
- MIVA Script (file extension .mvc)
- Model–view–controller, an architectural pattern used in software design
- ASP.NET MVC, a model–view–controller implementation by Microsoft
- Multiview Video Coding, an extension to 3D film television standards

== Organizations ==
- Christian Life Movement (Spanish: Movimiento de Vida Cristiana)
- Medigen Vaccine Biologics Corporation, a pharmacological company in Taiwan
- Movimiento Victoria Ciudadana (English: Citizens' Victory Movement), a Puerto Rican political party
- Music and Video Club, a defunct chain of music and video shops in the UK

=== Education ===
- Macleay Vocational College, a high school in New South Wales, Australia
- Moreno Valley College, in California, US
- Mountain View College (Philippines), Valencia City
- Mountain View College (Texas), Dallas, US
- Melbourn Village College, England

== Sport ==
- Minnesota Vikings Cheerleaders, cheerleaders for the National Football League team Minnesota Vikings
- The Miracle Violence Connection, a former professional wrestling tag team

=== Conferences ===
- Merrimack Valley Conference, a high school athletic conference in Massachusetts, US
- Miami Valley Conference, a high school athletic conference in Ohio, US
- Mississippi Valley Conference (Illinois), a high school athletic conference in Illinois, US
- Mississippi Valley Conference (Iowa), a high school athletic conference in Iowa, US
- Mississippi Valley Conference (Wisconsin), a high school athletic conference in Wisconsin, US
- Missouri Valley Conference, an NCAA Division I collegiate athletic conference in the US
- Mountain Valley Conference (New Jersey), a high school athletic conference in New Jersey, US

== Transportation ==
- Monroe County Airport (Alabama) (IATA airport code)
- Motor vehicle collision, a vehicle accident
- Motor Vehicle Commission, an alternate name for the Department of Motor Vehicles
- Mountain View Corridor, a planned highway in Utah, US

== Other uses ==
- Male voice choir
- Marvel vs. Capcom, a video game series
  - Marvel vs. Capcom: Clash of Super Heroes, 1998 video game
- Maha Vir Chakra, a military decoration in India
- Maharishi Vedic City, Iowa
- Mutual violent control, a type of domestic violence
