= COVID-19 vaccination in Taiwan =

Plan to immunize against COVID-19

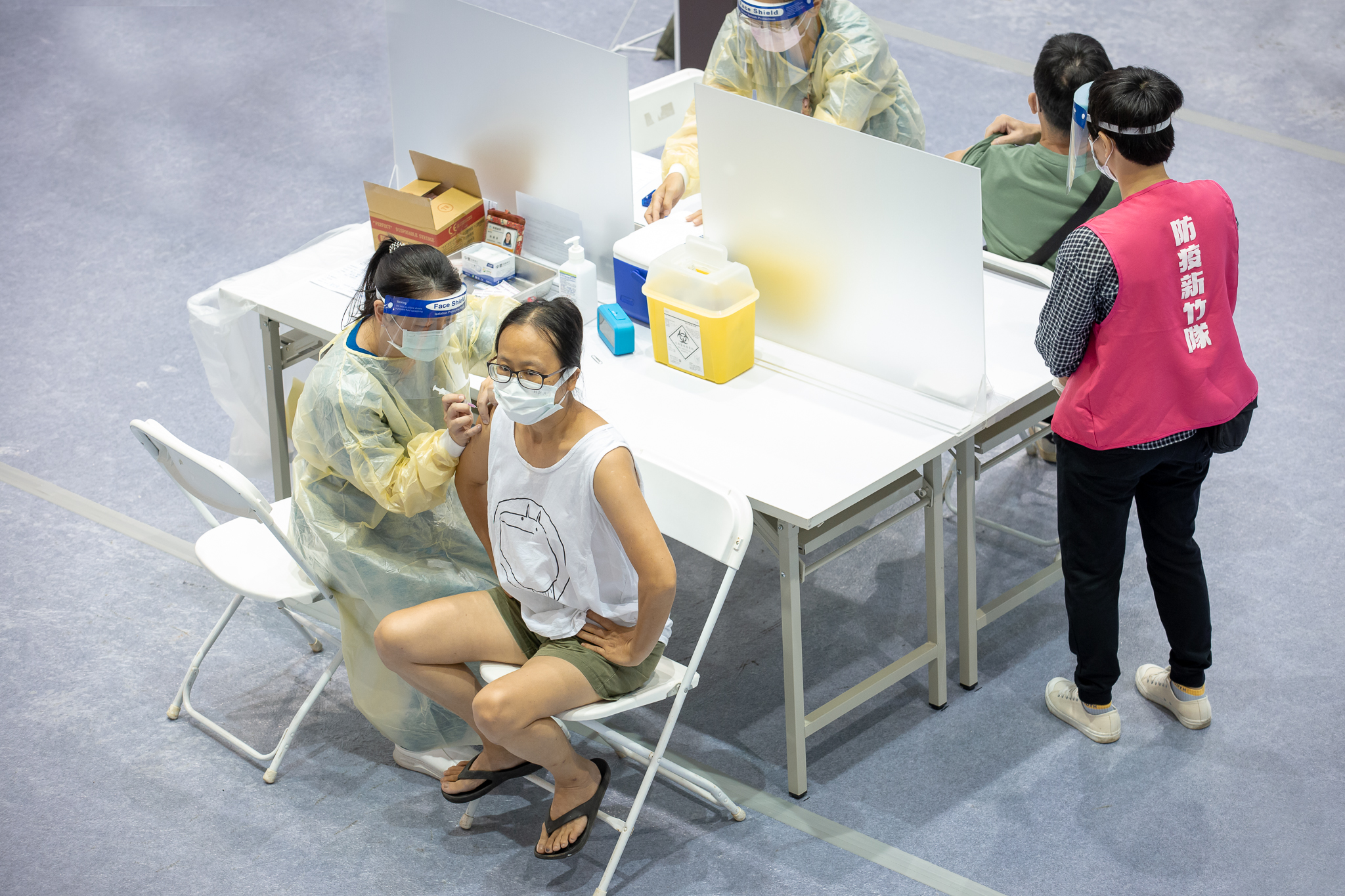
- Image showing a civilian receiving a COVID-19 vaccine in a vaccination site at Hsinchu under Taiwan's COVID-19 vaccination plan.
- Date: 22 March 2021 – present
- Location: Taiwan
- Cause: COVID-19 pandemic in Taiwan
- Target: Immunization against COVID-19
- Budget: 18.7 billion NT$
- Organized by: Taiwan Centers for Disease Control
- Participants: 21,802,750 people have received at least one vaccine dose 20,546,190 people have been fully vaccinated 17,220,124 people have received a booster dose 4,018,016 people have received two booster doses 386,543 people have received three booster doses as of 21 October 2022
- Outcome: 94% of the Taiwanese population have received at least one vaccine dose 88.6% of the Taiwanese population have been fully vaccinated 74% of the Taiwanese population have received a booster dose 17.3% of the Taiwanese population have received two booster doses 1.7% of the Taiwanese population have received three booster doses as of 27 November 2022

1. Unvaccinated population: 1,869,508 (8.10%)
2. Population who have received 1 dose: 1,401,521 (6.00%)
3. Population that have received 2 doses: 3,368,689 (14.5%)
4. Population that have received 1 booster dose (3 shots): 14,859,353 (64.1%)
5. Population that have received two booster doses (4 shots): 1,687,207 (7.30%)

COVID-19 vaccination in Taiwan is an ongoing immunization campaign against severe acute respiratory syndrome coronavirus 2 (SARS-CoV-2), in response to the ongoing pandemic in the country.

As of February 23, 2023, Taiwan's Central Epidemic Command Center (CECC) said that 94% of the population had received at least one dose of COVID-19 vaccine, 76.3% had had a booster shot, and 23% had received a third dose.

As of 21 October 2022, 21,761,873 people, or 93.81% of the Taiwanese population has received at least one dose, while 20,447,829 people, or 88.14% of the population have received at least two doses, while 17,102,993, or 73.73% of the population have received at least three, while 3,300,926 people, or 14.23% of the population having received at least four, and 249,559 people, or 1.1% of the population, having received all five. A further 185,463 immunocompromised individuals, or 0.8% of the population, have received a weakened version of the booster dose. 93.96% of those over 12 have received the first booster dose, while 41.4% of those over 65 have received the second booster dose.

Following the approval of the Oxford–AstraZeneca COVID-19 vaccine on 18 March 2021, vaccinations commenced on 22 March 2021, and will continue throughout the year with the goal of vaccinating 70% of the population by late October 2021.

== Timeline ==
=== 2021 ===
==== March to May ====
On 3 March 2021 the first shipment of the Oxford–AstraZeneca COVID-19 vaccine was delivered. The 117,000 doses are part of the 10 million doses of the vaccine that the Taiwanese government had previously ordered.

On 18 March the AstraZeneca vaccine was approved by the government, and vaccinations commenced on 22 March 2021. The vaccine is free for all Taiwanese people and long-term residents. Health workers, other frontline workers and seniors were the first to be inoculated with the vaccine.

On 5 May the Moderna COVID-19 vaccine was approved for emergency use, and the first batch of 150,000 doses was delivered on 28 May 2021.

On 17 May 400,000 doses of the AstraZeneca vaccine that were ordered through COVAX arrived in the midst of Taiwan's largest COVID-19 pandemic.

On 31 May Taiwan Centers for Disease Control announced that 10 million doses of domestically produced vaccines (Medigen and United Biomedical) had been pre-reserved. 5 million of each vaccine were reserved. They are expected to be approved and deployed sometime in July 2021.

==== June ====
On 2 June Taiwan recorded the first case of blood clotting linked to the Oxford–AstraZeneca COVID-19 vaccination.

On 4 June Japan donated 1.24 million doses of the Oxford–AstraZeneca COVID-19 vaccine to Taiwan.

On 6 June three American senators who arrived in Taiwan announced that the United States will donate 750,000 vaccine doses to Taiwan, the brand of which is still currently unknown. On 20 June 2.5 million Moderna vaccine doses arrived, which represented an increase from the 750,000 doses pledged. The doses arrived on a China Airlines flight from Memphis.

On 18 June Taiwan Centers for Disease Control announced that a second shipment of 240,000 doses of the Moderna vaccine were set to arrive in Taiwan from Luxembourg.

On 22 June the government of Lithuania announced that it was donating 20,000 doses of AstraZeneca vaccine in September. It was announced that earlier in the pandemic, Taiwan had sent 100,000 masks to Lithuania in a time of need.

==== July ====
On 4 July the Taiwanese government has successfully vaccinated 10% of the population with at least one dose of COVID-19 vaccine.

On 7 July the first batch of a Thailand-made AstraZeneca vaccine arrived in Taiwan. The 625,000 doses are part of the 10 million doses that the Taiwanese government had previously ordered.

On 8 July Japan donated another 1.13 million doses of the AstraZeneca vaccine to Taiwan. Combined with the first donation, Japan has donated a total of 2.37 million doses of the vaccine to Taiwan.

On 12 July Foxconn Technology and TSMC announced that they had reached final agreements with Fosun Pharma to each purchase 5 million doses of the Pfizer-BioNTech COVID-19 vaccine. Combined, the two deals would include a total of 10 million vaccines, which will be donated to Taiwan's CDC for Taiwan's domestic vaccination plan. Despite signing the deal with Shanghai Fosun Pharmaceutical Group, an agreement has been made that the Pfizer-BioNTech COVID-19 vaccines would be manufactured and shipped directly from Germany. The deal has been widely seen as a compromise between multiple parties. The Tsai Administration, which was strictly against the importation of Chinese COVID-19 vaccines in Taiwan, has successfully secured direct access to German manufactured Pfizer-BioNTech COVID-19 vaccine. Meanwhile, Shanghai Fosun Pharmaceutical Group is able to maintain the legitimacy of their license and distribution rights in China, SAR Hong Kong, SAR Macau, and Taiwan.

On 13 July Taiwan's Central Epidemic Command Center announced that all residents and nationals of Taiwan who were born in or before 2003 would be eligible for making appointments on the Taiwanese COVID-19 vaccination platform, marking the next stage of Taiwan's domestic wide COVID-19 vaccination.

On 15 July Taiwan received three shipments of COVID-19 vaccines. The shipments of vaccine includes 970,000 doses of the Oxford-AstraZeneca vaccine donated by Japan, 560,000 doses of the vaccine manufactured in Thailand, and 350,000 doses of the Moderna vaccine made in Europe, which equals to a total of 1.88 million doses of vaccines. The Japanese donation is the third batch of the AstraZeneca vaccine that the Japanese government has donated to Taiwan. Combined with the previous two, the Japanese government has donated a total amount of 3.37 million doses.

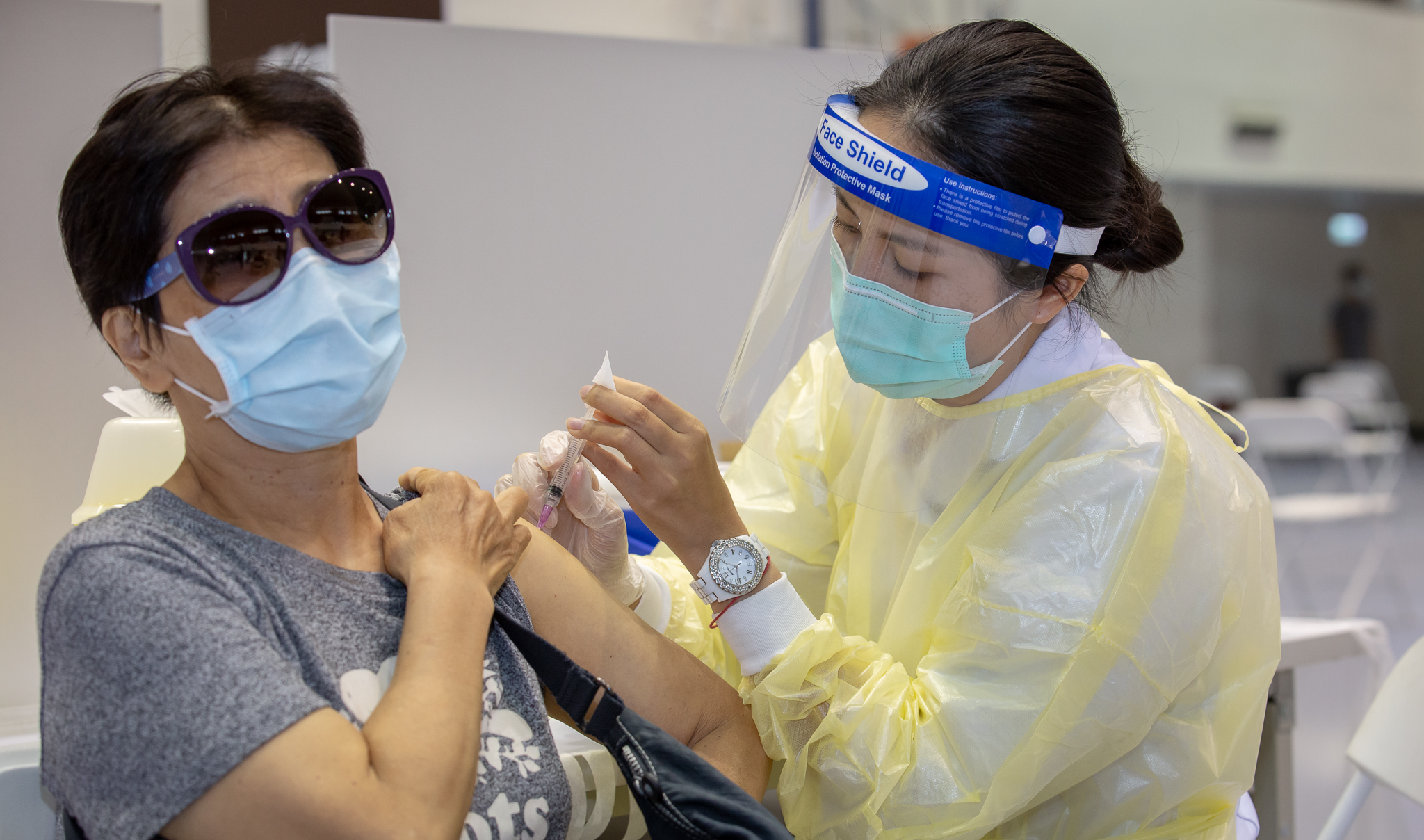
Image showing a civilian receiving a COVID-19 vaccine in a vaccination site in Hsinchu.

On 16 July the Taiwanese government has successfully vaccinated 20% of the population with at least one dose of COVID-19 vaccine.

On 19 July the Taiwanese government granted Emergency Usage Authorization (EUA) to the COVID-19 vaccine developed by Medigen Biotechnology Corp. The Medigen COVID-19 vaccine is the first domestic COVID-19 vaccine that was given EUA approval by the Taiwanese government and the first in the world. Despite the vaccine has proven to be safe through its Phase 2 clinical trial, the approval was still considered a controversial political move due to the lack of efficacy data and Phase 3 clinical-trial.

On 21 July the Tzu Chi Foundation announced they had reached final agreements and signed a deal with Fosun Pharma to purchase 5 million doses of Pfizer–BioNTech COVID-19 vaccine. The 5 million doses of the Pfizer-BioNTech COVID-19 vaccine would be donated to Taiwan's CDC for Taiwan's domestic vaccination plan. Combined with the previous two deals signed by Foxconn Technology and TSMC, the three companies would acquire a total of 15 million doses of the Pfizer-BioNTech COVID-19 vaccine for the Taiwanese government.

Taiwan's government also announced on the same day that vaccination roll-out would be extended to the age group of 12 to 18, which will be prioritized to receive the Pfizer-BioNTech COVID-19 vaccine once it is delivered.

On 22 July the Taiwanese government announced a series of new orders of the Moderna COVID-19 vaccine. The deal includes the additional purchase of 1 million doses of Moderna COVID-19 vaccine for the 4th quarter of 2021 and 35 million doses of booster vaccine for 2022 and 2023.

On 27 July Taiwan received 582,000 doses of the Oxford-AstraZeneca COVID-19 vaccine. This is the fourth batch of vaccine that the Taiwanese government have received as part of their 10 million dose order of Oxford-AstraZeneca COVID-19 vaccine.

On 28 July the Taiwanese government has successfully vaccinated 30% of the population with at least one dose of COVID-19 vaccine.

On 31 July 20,000 doses of Oxford–AstraZeneca COVID-19 vaccine donated by the Lithuanian government arrived in Taiwan, making Lithuania the third country after Japan and the United States to donate COVID-19 vaccine to Taiwan.

==== August ====
On 2 August Taiwan's Food and Drug Administration (TFDA) finished the inspection of the first 4 batches of the local made Medigen COVID-19 vaccine. The first four batches of Medigen COVID-19 vaccine includes a total of 265,568 doses, which will be use for Taiwan's domestic vaccination starting in August.

On 8 August Taiwan received 99,600 doses of the Moderna COVID-19 vaccine. This is the 5th batch of vaccine that the Taiwanese government have received part of their 6.05 million dose order of Moderna COVID-19 vaccine that are scheduled to arrive in 2021.

On 12 August Taiwan received 524,000 doses of the Oxford–AstraZeneca COVID-19 vaccine.

On 15 August Taiwan received 249,600 doses of the Moderna COVID-19 vaccine. The 249,600 doses of vaccine were scheduled to be use as the 2nd shot for those who already received the first dose startirgting in September.

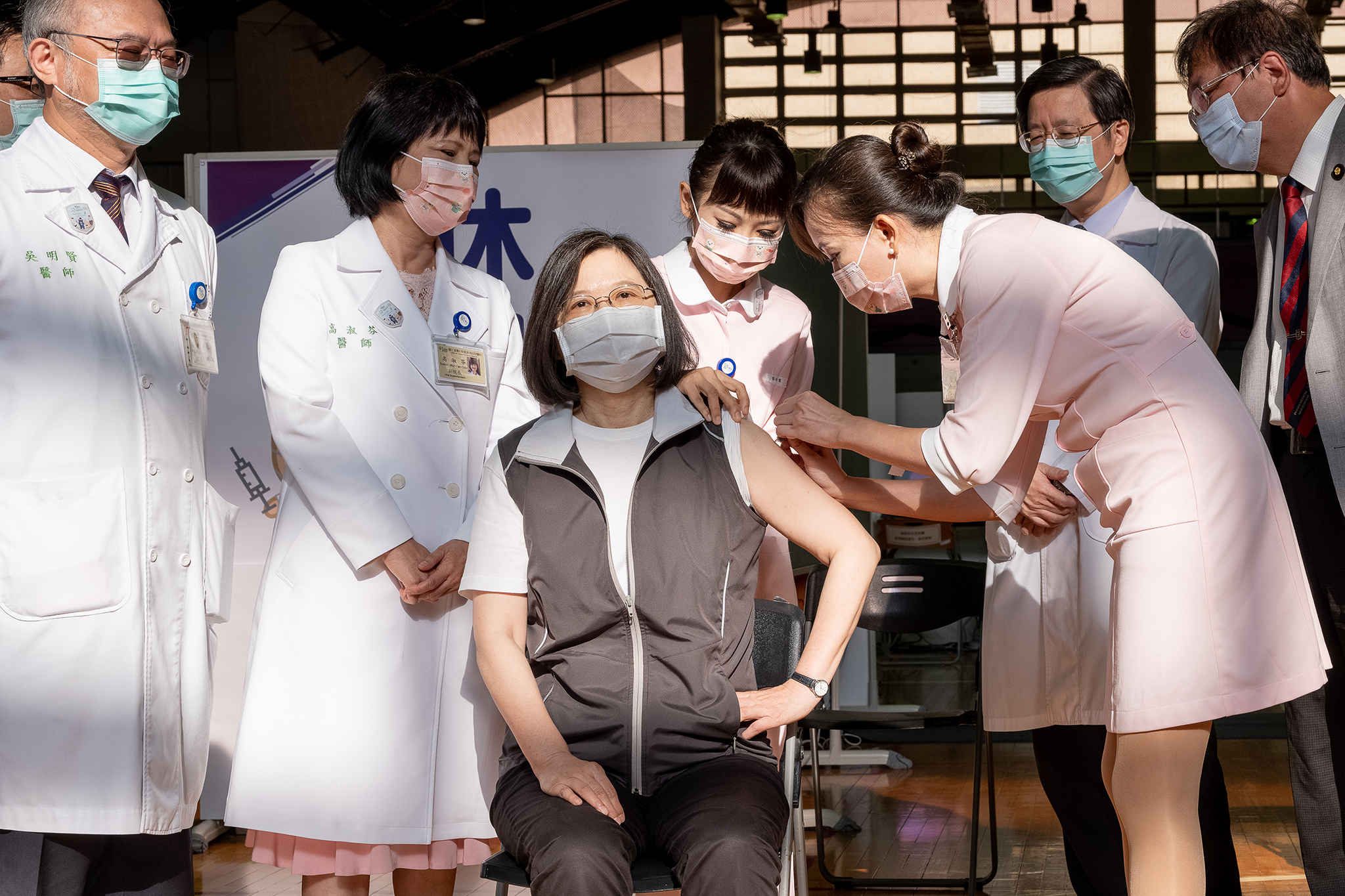
President Tsai Ing-wen receiving her first dose of Medigen COVID-19 vaccine. President Tsai became the first non-trial participant to receive the vaccine.

On 23 August President Tsai Ing-wen received the first shot of the local made Medigen COVID-19 vaccine, kick starting the vaccination of Taiwan's first locally made COVID-19 vaccine. On the same day, Taiwan's Food and Drug Administration (TFDA) also finished the inspection of 4 additional batches of the Medigen COVID-19 vaccine. With inspections clear with the 4 additional batches of Medigen COVID-19 vaccine, a total 870,000 doses of Medigen COVID-19 vaccine are scheduled to be delivered in the following week.

In the end of August and start of September, Taiwan have received a few additional batches of COVID-19 vaccines from both direct pharmaceutical orders and donations. On 27 and 31 of August, Taiwan received 265,000 doses and 595,000 doses of the Oxford–AstraZeneca COVID-19 vaccine. On 29 August, Taiwan received 30,000 doses of Moderna COVID-19 vaccine that were donated by the Czech government. On 2 September, Taiwan received 930,000 doses of Pfizer–BioNTech COVID-19 vaccine donated by Foxconn, TSMC, and Tzu-chi Foundation.

The donation of Moderna COVID-19 vaccine makes Czech Republic the fourth country to donate COVID-19 vaccines to Taiwan after Japan, United States, and Lithuania. The 930,000 doses of the Pfizer–BioNTech COVID-19 vaccine was the first batch of Pfizer-BioNTech vaccine that Taiwan received and were part of the 15 million doses of Pfizer-BioNTech COVID-19 vaccine donation made by Foxconn, TSMC, and Tzu-chi Foundation. The late August early September vaccine delivery was seen as a crucial moment for Taiwan's COVID-19 vaccination plan as vaccination for the Oxford-AstraZeneca COVID-19 vaccine were now able to be extended all the way up to those ages above 23. The arrival of Pfizer-BioNTech COVID-19 vaccine also allows the CECC to kick start the vaccination for those from age 12 to 22.

==== September ====
On 3 September, Japan announced that it has finalize plans to donate another batch of Oxford-AstraZeneca COVID-19 vaccine to Taiwan. The 64,000 doses of Oxford-AstraZeneca COVID-19 vaccine were delivered on 7 September. Combined with the previous donations, Japan has donated 4 batches and over 3.4 million doses of Oxford-AstraZeneca COVID-19 vaccine to Taiwan since June.

On 4 September, Poland announced that it will donate 400,000 doses of Oxford–AstraZeneca COVID-19 vaccine to Taiwan as a sign of friendship for Taiwan's donation of medical supplies to Poland in 2020. The donation makes Poland the 6th country after Japan, United States, Lithuania, Czech Republic, and Slovakia to announce donation of COVID-19 vaccine to Taiwan. The Polish donation was also the third largest in quantity behind Japan and United States.

On 5 September, Taiwan received two batches of the Oxford–AstraZeneca COVID-19 vaccine The first batch includes 400,000 doses of vaccine donated by the Polish government and the second batch includes 410,400 doses that were part of the vaccine purchase deal with COVAX.

On 9 September, the second batch of the Pfizer–BioNTech COVID-19 vaccine, with 910,000 doses, arrived in Taiwan. Combined with the first batch, the 1.8 million dose of Pfizer-BioNTech COVID-19 vaccine will be used for the youth vaccination program, ranging from age 12 to 22.

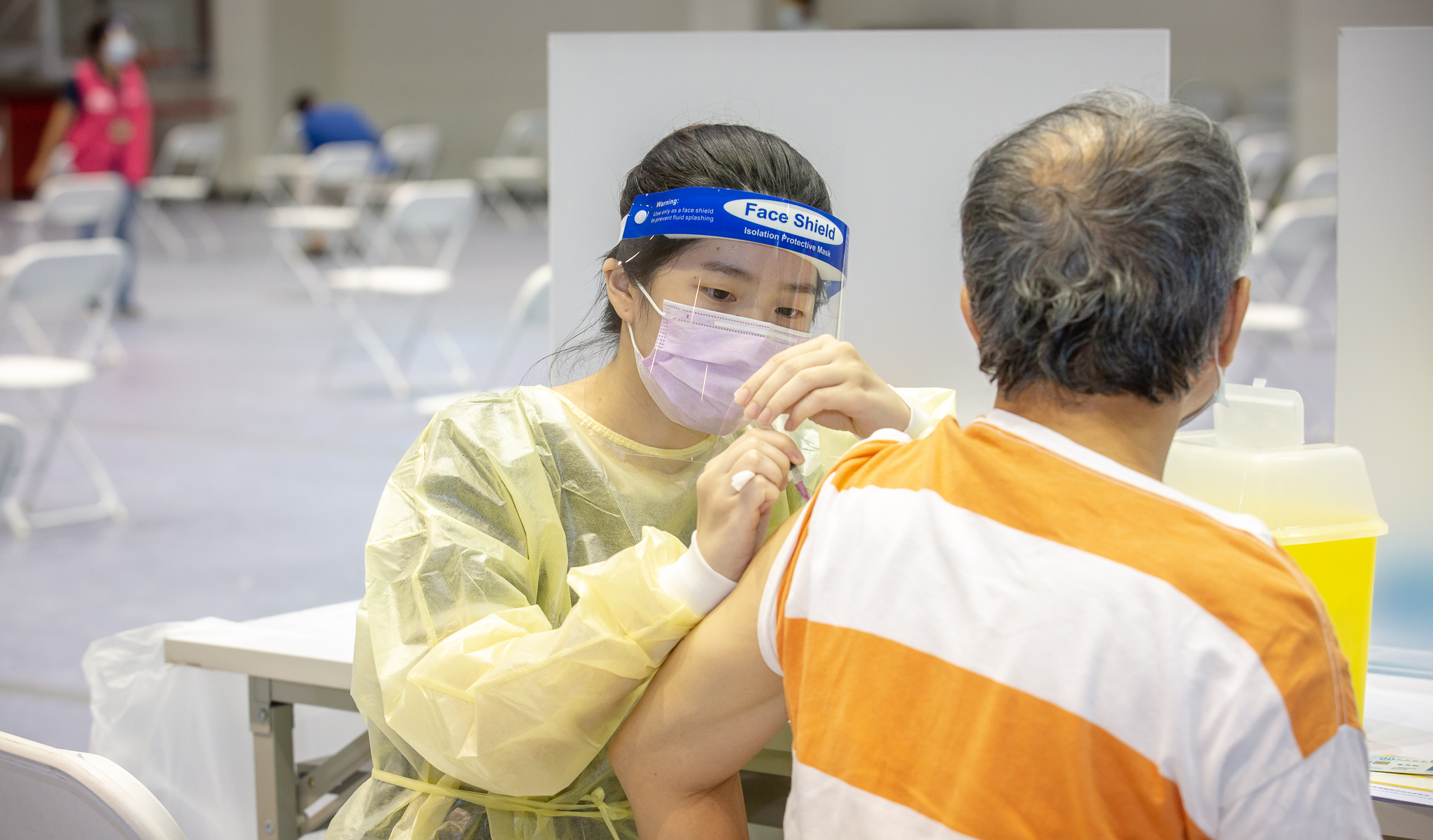
Man receiving a COVID-19 vaccine shot in a vaccination center in Hsinchu, Taiwan.

On 10 September, Taiwan received 458,000 doses of the AstraZeneca COVID-19 vaccine from the pharmaceutical manufacturer, which is part of the 10 million dose deal the Taiwanese government signed with AstraZeneca.

On 17 September, Taiwan received another 640,000 doses of the AstraZeneca vaccine from the pharmaceutical manufacturer, as well as 1,080,000 doses of the Moderna COVID-19 vaccine.

On 22 September, Taiwan began the roll-out of the Pfizer-BioNTech COVID-19 vaccine. The Pfizer-BioNTech COVID-19 vaccination plan will be started off with the age group 12 to 22 and those with ages above 60 or 40 in Group 9.

On 25 September, Taiwan received a further 500,000 doses of the AstraZeneca vaccine donated by the Japanese government. Combined with the previous donations, Japan has donated a total of 3.9 million doses to Taiwan through 5 batches from June to September.

On 26 September, Taiwan received 160,000 doses of Oxford-AstraZeneca vaccine donated by the Slovak government. Slovakia, following Lithuania, Czech Republic, and Poland, became the fourth European country to donate COVID-19 vaccines to Taiwan. The CECC announced later that same day that the Oxford-AstraZeneca COVID-19 vaccine donated by Slovakia combined with other recent arrivals will all be used for second dose administration.

On 30 September, the third batch of Pfizer-BioNTech COVID-19 vaccine, with 540,000 doses, arrived in Taiwan, marking the start of the second delivery with 2 more batches arriving on October 1 and 4. On the same day, Taiwan received another 656,000 doses of the Oxford-AstraZeneca COVID-19 vaccine directly from the pharmaceutical manufacturer. As of 30 September 2021, Taiwan has received an accumulative total of 10 million dose of the Oxford-AstraZeneca COVID-19 vaccine with more than 50% of the 10 million dose vaccine deal with AstraZeneca being delivered.

==== October ====
In October, Taiwan received a series of Pfizer-BioNTech COVID-19 vaccine deliveries. The early October deliveries allowed the CECC to expand vaccination capacity among different age groups, with age group 12–22, 9th group ages above 18, and age group 47 or above becoming eligible for receiving the first dose of Pfizer-BioNTech COVID-19 vaccine.

On 1 October, the fourth batch of the Pfizer–BioNTech COVID-19 vaccine with 670,000 doses, arrived in Taiwan.

On 4 October, the fifth batch of Pfizer–BioNTech COVID-19 vaccine with 270,000 doses, arrived in Taiwan.

On 6 October, Terry Gou, founder of Foxconn, announced that the third delivery Pfizer-BioNTech COVID-19 vaccine, with 1.6 to 1.8 million doses, will be delivered in the following week. The delivery has been split up into multiple batches and deliveries were received starting on October 7.

In the following weeks, Taiwan received multiple batches of the Pfizer–BioNTech COVID-19 vaccine. On 7 October, the sixth batch of Pfizer–BioNTech COVID-19 vaccine, with 889,200 doses, arrived in Taiwan. On 8 October, the seventh batch of Pfizer–BioNTech COVID-19 vaccine, with 889,200 doses, arrived in Taiwan. On 14 October, the eighth batch of Pfizer–BioNTech COVID-19 vaccine, with 827,000 doses, arrived in Taiwan. On 28 October, the ninth batch of Pfizer–BioNTech COVID-19 vaccine, with 902,100 doses, arrived in Taiwan. On 29 October, the tenth batch of the Pfizer–BioNTech COVID-19 vaccine, with 910,300 doses, arrived in Taiwan.

On 9 October, the eighth batch of the Moderna COVID-19 vaccine, with 1.13 million doses, and donation of 235,900 doses of the Oxford–AstraZeneca COVID-19 vaccine by the Lithuanian government arrived in Taiwan. The CECC later announced on the same day that the 1.13 million dose of Moderna COVID-19 vaccine will be primarily given to those who receive their first dose before 16 of July.

On 13 October, Taiwan received 1,360,000 doses of Oxford–AstraZeneca COVID-19 vaccine from the pharmaceutical manufacturer. On 27 October, Taiwan received a further 300,000 doses of Oxford–AstraZeneca COVID-19 vaccine.

==== November ====
On 1 November, Taiwan received its second donation of Moderna COVID-19 vaccine from the United States with 1.5 million doses. On 5 November, Taiwan received its eleventh shipment of Pfizer–BioNTech vaccine with 871,700 doses.

On 10 November, Taiwan halts 2nd-dose of Pfizer–BioNTech COVID-19 vaccine for ages 12–17 due to concerns of myocarditis.

On 25 November, the percentage of Taiwanese citizens who are fully vaccinated against COVID-19 has reached 50%, nearing the Taiwan Centers for Disease Control's goal of 60% at the end of the year and the potential criteria for loosening border restrictions.

On 30 November, in order to prevent the spread of the latest COVID-19 Omicron variant, the Taiwan Centers for Disease Control announced COVID-19 booster shot policy details. Everyone above the age of 18 is encouraged to get a COVID-19 booster shot six months after receiving their second dose, with no restriction on vaccine brands.

== Progress to date ==
1. AstraZeneca COVID-19 vaccine (15,269,806 doses) (29.0%)
2. Moderna COVID-19 vaccine (19,079,747 doses) (36.3%)
3. Medigen Biologics COVID-19 vaccine (2,572,305 doses) (4.89%)
4. Pfizer-BioNTech COVID-19 vaccine (15,675,164 doses) (29.8%)

== Vaccine orders and arrival ==
=== Vaccine types ===
Vaccine	Manufacturer	Origin	Progress	EUA Approval	Deployment
Oxford–AstraZeneca; Covishield and Vaxzevria	Oxford University and AstraZeneca	United Kingdom, Sweden	phase III clinical trials	18 March 2021	22 March 2021
Moderna Spikevax	Moderna	United States	phase III clinical trials	5 May 2021	9 June 2021
MVC-COV1901	Medigen Vaccine Biologics Corporation	Taiwan	phase II clinical trials	19 July 2021	23 August 2021
BioNTech-Pfizer Comirnaty	BioNTech with Pfizer	United States, Germany	phase III clinical trials	3 August 2021	22 September 2021
Novavax Covovax	Novavax	United States	phase III clinical trials	18 June 2022	8 July 2022
Janssen	Janssen Vaccines	United States, Netherlands	phase III clinical trials	10 June 2021	Pending
UB-612 Vaxxinity (formerly COVAXX), and DASA	United Biomedical, Inc. Asia	Taiwan	phase II clinical trials	Pending	Pending

=== Vaccines orders and donations ===
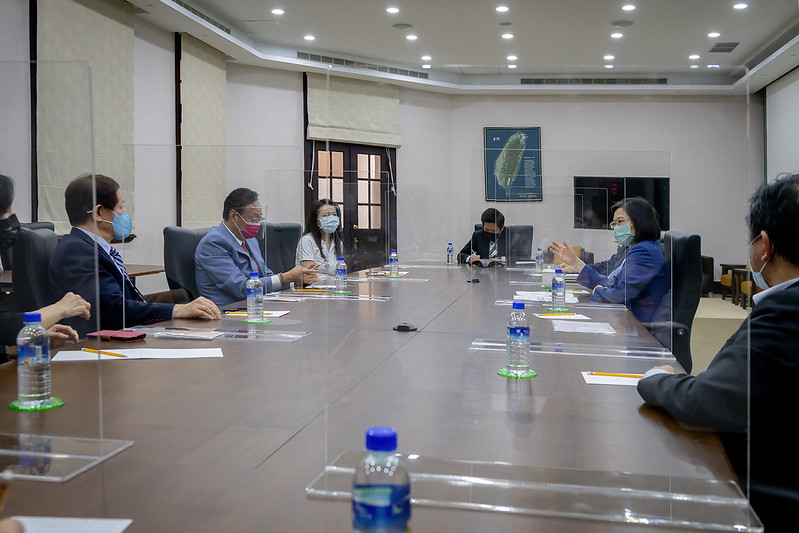
President Tsai discussing with representatives from Foxconn and TSMC on the purchase of Pfizer-BioNTech COVID-19 vaccine.

The Taiwanese government has ordered COVID-19 vaccines directly from the Oxford-AstraZeneca, Moderna, Medigen Vaccine Biologics Corp., and

United Biomedical. The Taiwanese government has also ordered another 4.76 million dose of vaccine through the COVAX platform besides the direct orders from pharmaceutical companies. An additional 15 million doses of Pfizer-BioNTech COVID-19 vaccine purchased by Foxconn, Taiwan Semiconductor Foundry Company, and Tzu-Chi Foundation were also donated to the Taiwanese government for Taiwan's COVID-19 vaccination plan.

Vaccine Orders and Donations
Direct Pharmaceutical Orders		COVAX		Donation		
Vaccine	Doses ordered	Vaccine Types	Doses	Source	Vaccine	Doses
Oxford–AstraZeneca	10 million	Oxford–AstraZeneca	199,200	Foxconn	BioNTech-Pfizer	5 million
Moderna	5.05 million	Oxford–AstraZeneca	410,400	TSMC	BioNTech-Pfizer	5 million
Moderna	36 million	Oxford–AstraZeneca	410,400	Tzu-chi Foundation	BioNTech-Pfizer	5 million
MVC-COV1901	5 million	Unspecified WHO Approved COVID-19 vaccine	3,740,000	Japan	Oxford–AstraZeneca	1.24 million
UB-612	5 million			Japan	Oxford–AstraZeneca	1.13 million
				Japan	Oxford–AstraZeneca	0.97 million
				Japan	Oxford–AstraZeneca	64,000
				Japan	Oxford–AstraZeneca	500,000
				United States	Moderna	2.5 million
				Lithuania	Oxford–AstraZeneca	255,900
				Czech Republic	Moderna	30,000
				Slovakia	Oxford–AstraZeneca	160,000
				Poland	Oxford–AstraZeneca	400,000
Total	61,050,000	Total	4,760,000	Total		22,249,900
Accumulative Total Receivable Vaccine: 88,059,900 Doses

=== Foreign Vaccine Arrival ===
Arrived Foreign Vaccine as of 30 September 2021
Oxford-AstraZeneca			Moderna			Pfizer-BioNTech		
Date	Amount	Source	Date	Amount	Source	Date	Amount	Source
3 March 2021	117,000	Pharmaceutical Company Manufactured	28 May 2021	150,000	Pharmaceutical Company Manufactured	2 September 2021	930,000	TSMC/Foxconn/Tzu-chi Foundation Donation
4 April 2021	199,200	COVAX	18 June 2021	240,000	Pharmaceutical Company Manufactured	9 September 2021	910,000	TSMC/Foxconn/Tzu-chi Foundation Donation
19 May 2021	410,400	COVAX	20 June 2021	2,500,000	United States Donation	30 September 2021	540,000	TSMC/Foxconn/Tzu-chi Foundation Donation
4 June 2021	1,240,000	Japan Donation	30 June 2021	410,000	Pharmaceutical Company Manufactured	1 October 2021	670,000	TSMC/Foxconn/Tzu-chi Foundation Donation
7 July 2021	626,000	Pharmaceutical Company Manufactured	15 July 2021	350,400	Pharmaceutical Company Manufactured	4 October 2021	270,000	TSMC/Foxconn/Tzu-chi Foundation Donation
8 July 2021	1,130,000	Japan Donation	8 August 2021	99,600	Pharmaceutical Company Manufactured	7 October 2021	889,200	TSMC/Foxconn/Tzu-chi Foundation Donation
15 July 2021	970,000	Japan Donation	15 August 2021	249,600	Pharmaceutical Company Manufactured	8 October 2021	889,200	TSMC/Foxconn/Tzu-chi Foundation Donation
15 July 2021	560,700	Pharmaceutical Company Manufactured	29 August 2021	30,000	Czech Republic Donation	14 October 2021	827,000	TSMC/Foxconn/Tzu-chi Foundation Donation
27 July 2021	582,000	Pharmaceutical Company Manufactured	17 Sep 2021	1,080,000	Pharmaceutical Company Manufactured	28 October 2021	902,100	TSMC/Foxconn/Tzu-chi Foundation Donation
31 July 2021	20,000	Lithuania Donation	9 October 2021	1,130,000	Pharmaceutical Company Manufactured	29 October 2021	910,300	TSMC/Foxconn/Tzu-chi Foundation Donation
12 August 2021	524,000	Pharmaceutical Company Manufactured	1 November 2021	1,500,000	United States Donation	5 November 2021	871,700	TSMC/Foxconn/Tzu-chi Foundation Donation
27 August 2021	265,000	Pharmaceutical Company Manufactured						
31 August 2021	595,000	Pharmaceutical Company Manufactured						
5 September 2021	400,000	Poland Donation						
5 September 2021	410,400	COVAX						
7 September 2021	64,000	Japan Donation						
10 September 2021	458,000	Pharmaceutical Company Manufactured						
17 September 2021	640,000	Pharmaceutical Company Manufactured						
25 September 2021	500,000	Japan Donation						
26 September 2021	160,000	Slovakia Donation						
30 September 2021	656,000	Pharmaceutical Company Manufactured						
9 October 2021	235,900	Lithuania Donation						
13 October 2021	1,360,000	Pharmaceutical Company Manufactured						
27 October 2021	300,000	Japan Donation						
Oxford-AstraZeneca	12,422,900		Moderna	7,742,100		Pfizer-BioNTech	8,609,500	
Total Arrived as of 30 September 2021			20,976,500					

=== Domestic vaccine ===
Total Produced Accumulative Number of Domestic Vaccine as 24 September 2021
	Medigen Biologics	United Biomedical	Total
Number of doses	1,700,000	0	1,700,000

== Vaccination ==
=== Vaccination plan ===
The Taiwanese government has created a prioritization list for domestic COVID-19 vaccination plan, which includes 10 prioritized groups.

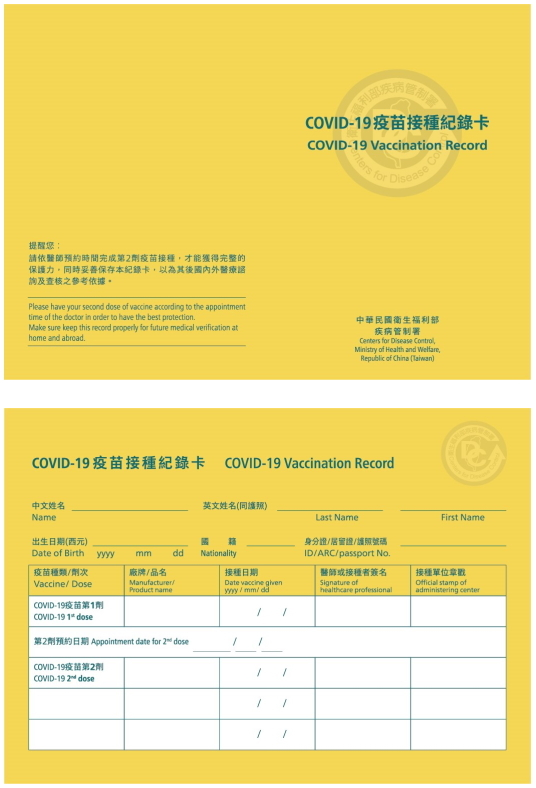
After inoculation, individuals receive an official yellow card like the one above that records individuals' vaccination information.

Order	Group Label	Details	Estimated number of eligible people	Accumulative number of people
1	Medical or Health Personnel	licensed or documented medical personnel; non-medical personnel hired in medical or health affiliated workspace (including public quarantine centers)	528,000	528,000
2	Central or Local Government Epidemic Prevention Affiliated Personnel	government officials in charge of leading and creating epidemic prevention policies and decisions; officials in charge of vaccine or health equipment distribution; CIQS border patrols (custom, immigration, quarantine, and security); fire fighters and police; members of the Republic of China Armed Forces	166,000	645,000
3	High-risk Front Line Personnel	pilots and flight attendants; quarantine transportation personnel; private quarantine center personnel; non-CIQS border patrols	61,000	706,000
4	People with Special Traveling Needs	ambassadors/ representatives/ officials with traveling needs; athletic representatives	2,000	708,000
5	Nursing Centers and Dialysis Affiliated Personnel	public and private nursing centers affiliated personnel or patients; dialysis patients and affiliated helpers; other rehabilitation institutions	467,000	1,175,000
6	Age 75 or above and Pregnant Women	any age 75 or above elder plus any age 65 or above native ethnicity individuals; were prioritized to be vaccinated with the Moderna COVID-19 vaccine	180,000	2,904,000
7	Security and Social Function affiliated Personnel	military and national security affiliated personnel; non-front-line affiliated police officials; military police; transportation and storage affiliated personnel; education and school affiliated personnel; kindergarten and nursery center personnel; news media front line personnel	860,000	3,764,000
8	Age 65 to 74	any individuals between and include the age of 65 to 74; any native ethnicity individuals between and include the age of 55 to 64	1,985,000	5,749,000
9	Age 19 to 64 Individuals Diagnosis with High Risk Medical Conditions	any individual between and include the age of 19 to 64 that are or were diagnosed with high-risk medical conditions; also includes those with rare medical conditions or serious medical conditions	3,875,000	9,624,000
10	Age 50 to 64	any individuals between and include the age of 50 to 64	5,300,000	14,924,000

=== Vaccination Appointment Platform ===
On 6 July, the Central Epidemic Command Center (CECC) announced the creation of Taiwan Domestic COVID-19 Vaccination Appointment Platform, allowing the digitalization of COVID-19 vaccination sign up and appointments. The platform was created to simplify vaccination appointments and increase vaccine roll-outs.

The platform is a four-step system. In the first step, individuals would need to sign up on the website and fill in the necessary information, such as their National Identification Card number, National Health Insurance number, phone number, and their regional address. In first step, individuals are also allowed to choose their preferences, which includes the choice of receiving the Oxford-AstraZeneca COVID-19 Vaccine or the Moderna COVID-19 vaccine. In the second step, the system would send a message to individuals through their phone number and notify them to make an appointment. Individuals would only receive the message if they are eligible for vaccination and their preferred type of vaccine is in stock. In the third step, individuals can make their appointment on the platform, the vaccination app, or at the convenient store, pharmacy, or dedicated health centers. The appointment gives the option for individuals to select their preferred time and location. Lastly, in the fourth step, individuals would be required show up on-time for their appointment to be vaccinated. Individuals who missed their appointment would need to start the appointment process again.

On 8 July 2021, the CECC announced the opening of Taiwan Domestic COVID-19 Vaccination Appointment Platform across Taiwan, allowing the 9th and 10th priority group to sign up and fill in their vaccination preferences.

As of 15 July 2021, vaccination eligibility is open to the 9th and 10th priority groups and sign ups are open up to anyone born in or before 2003.

On 11 August 2021, Taiwan's CECC announced that appointment for the local made Medigen COVID-19 vaccine would be open for individuals of age 20 or above starting on August 16. Vaccination of the Medigen COVID-19 vaccine was announced to be held between August 23 to 29th.

On 27 August 2021, Taiwan's CECC announced that preference for the Pfizer-BioNTech COVID-19 vaccine would be open for registration on the platform.

=== Vaccination statistics ===
As of 1 April 2022
	First Dose	Second Dose	Additional Dose	Booster shot	Total Doses administered
Oxford-AstraZeneca	8,057,274	7,135,281	696	33,236	15,226,487
Moderna	4,130,357	4,263,069	130,647	8,103,164	16,627,237
Medigen Biologics	861,750	791,413	10,508	522,336	2,186,007
Pfizer-BioNTech	6,411,388	6,094,554	49,381	3,112,565	15,667,888
Total	19,460,769	18,284,317	191,232	11,771,301	49,707,619
Total/pop.	83.45%	78.41%	0.82%	50.48%	-

=== Vaccination regional data ===
As of July 15, 2021
	Oxford-AstraZeneca COVID-19 Vaccine		Moderna COVID-19 Vaccine	
Region	First Dose	Second Dose	First Dose	Second Dose
Taipei City	295,786	14,142	361,177	4,128
New Taipei City	267,960	10,057	416,019	3,721
Taoyuan City	181,455	10,642	244,111	1,230
Taichung City	221,324	7,684	219,122	4,602
Tainan City	139,287	4,248	171,763	2,355
Kaohsiung City	229,800	8,545	282,795	1,252
Hsinchu County	35,271	1,992	32,670	511
Chunghua County	98,259	2,040	106,717	596
Yunlin County	55,254	824	52,665	1,095
Pingtung County	68,841	1,563	91,304	903
Keelung City	35,096	698	37,237	53
Yilan County	37,955	1,172	38,751	677
Hsinchu City	34,131	842	40,498	5
Miaoli County	40,089	943	42,065	732
Chiayi City	29,525	1,221	24,048	591
Chiayi County	40,315	1,552	24,048	591
Hualien County	32,320	1,459	33,975	286
Taitung County	20,105	366	20,535	137
Nantou County	40,853	568	19,815	493
Penghu County	22,360	252	8,998	83
Kinmen County	16,486	155	8,330	160
Lienchiang County	6,423	126	2,228	0
Total	1,948,895	71,091	2,293,180	24,106
	2,019,986			

== See also ==
- COVID-19 vaccination in mainland China
- Deployment of COVID-19 vaccines
- COVID-19 vaccine
