= Typhoon In-fa =

Pacific typhoon in 2021

Typhoon In-fa (Fabian)
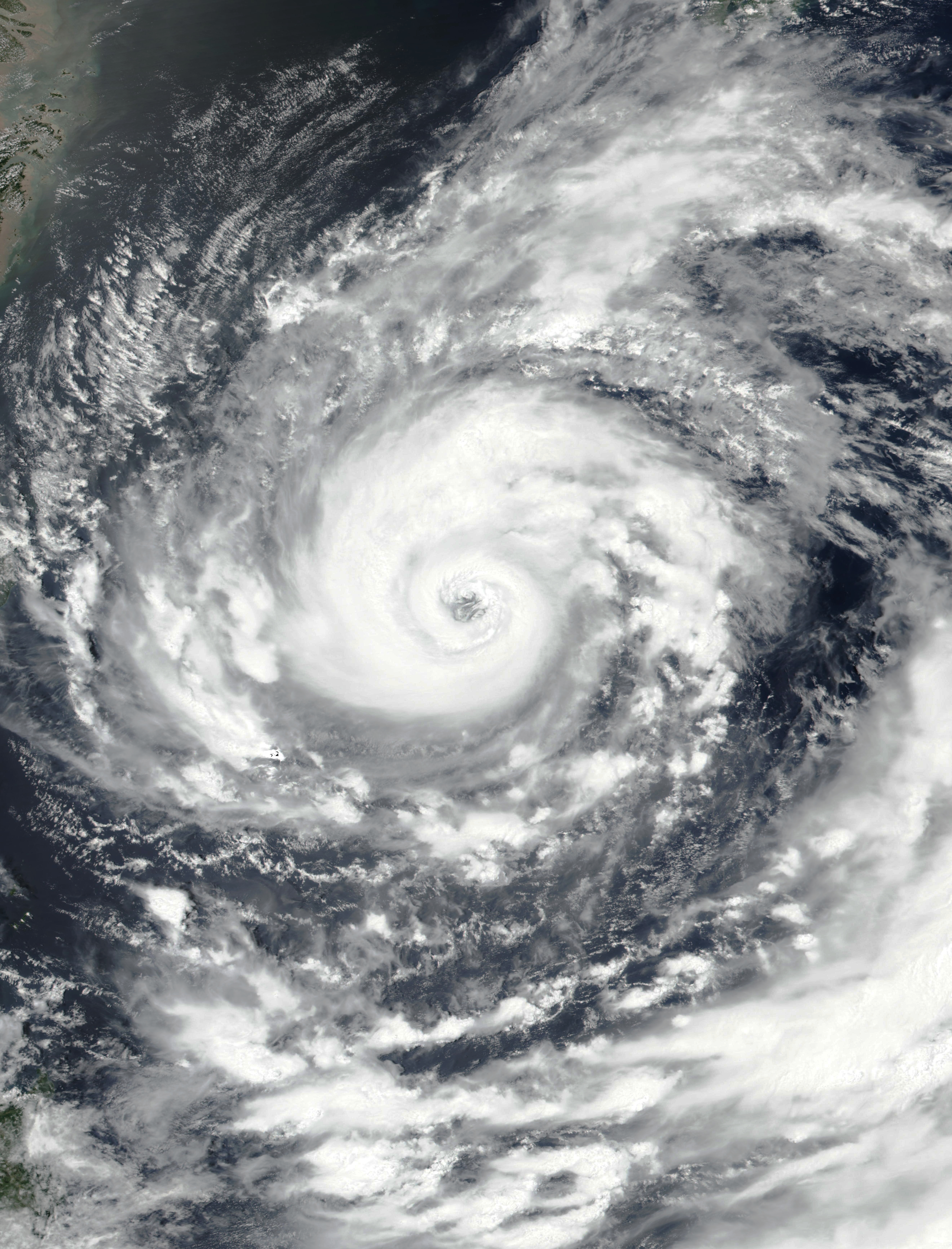
- Typhoon In-fa near its peak intensity south of Okinawa on July 21

Meteorological history
- Formed: July 15, 2021
- Extratropical: July 29, 2021
- Dissipated: July 31, 2021

Very strong typhoon
- 10-minute sustained (JMA)
- Highest winds: 155 km/h (100 mph)
- Lowest pressure: 950 hPa (mbar); 28.05 inHg

Category 2-equivalent typhoon
- 1-minute sustained (SSHWS/JTWC)
- Highest winds: 175 km/h (110 mph)
- Lowest pressure: 951 hPa (mbar); 28.08 inHg

Overall effects
- Fatalities: 6 total
- Damage: $2.04 billion (2021 USD)
- Areas affected: Philippines; Ryukyu Islands; Taiwan; China; North Korea
- IBTrACS
- Part of the 2021 Pacific typhoon season

Typhoon In-fa, (Note: The name In-fa (Cantonese: 煙花, [jiːn˥ faː˥]) was contributed by Macau and means fireworks in Cantonese.) known in the Philippines as Typhoon Fabian, was a very large and costly tropical cyclone that brought record amounts of rainfall to China in late July 2021, becoming the second-wettest tropical cyclone ever recorded in the country behind Typhoon Nina of 1975. It was also the first storm to impact the city of Shanghai since Typhoon Mitag of 2019. The ninth depression, sixth tropical storm and third typhoon of the 2021 Pacific typhoon season, the system was first noted by the Joint Typhoon Warning Center as an area of low pressure, located east of the Philippines on July 14. Favorable conditions helped the storm to intensify, becoming a tropical depression, two days later and a tropical storm on July 17, being assigned the name In-fa by the Japan Meteorological Agency. Located in a weak steering environment, the system struggled to organize under dry air and moderate wind shear before organizing further. It continued to move mostly westward, strengthening into a typhoon and deepening quickly. The storm struggled to organize itself significantly due to continuous dry air intrusions and its frequent motion changes. On July 21, it reached its peak intensity according to the JTWC with winds of 175 km/h (110 mph); the JMA estimated a lower numbers of 150 km/h (90 mph) on the system. Nevertheless, the system reached its minimum barometric pressure of 950 hPa (28.05 inHg), three days later after passing through the Ryukyu's. As the system entered the East China Sea, marginal conditions started to take toll on the system, with In-fa weakening steadily and slowly, until it made its consecutive landfalls over Putuo District of Zhoushan and Pinghu on July 25 and 26, respectively, as a tropical storm. For the next couple of days, the storm slowly moved inland while gradually weakening, before turning northward on July 29. Later that day, In-fa weakened into a remnant low over northern China. The remnants continued their northward trek for another couple of days, before dissipating near North Korea on July 31.

In-fa caused rough waves along the Japanese islands, along with torrential rainfall and high winds, highly damaging and downing many structures, killing one person. The Philippines experienced flooding due to heavy rainfall, and some winds, resulting in the death of five people. China experienced widespread impacts in agriculture, infrastructure, transportation, and other areas. The typhoon brought flooding rainfall and storm surge to a large area, with some regions experiencing nearly a month's worth of rainfall in just one to two days. Rivers overflowed and some floodwaters were up to the roofs of cars.

The storm exacerbated and played a part in starting the 2021 Henan floods, killing at least 302 people and at least 50 were missing. The typhoon itself has caused US$2.04 billion in damages and 6 deaths.

== Meteorological history ==
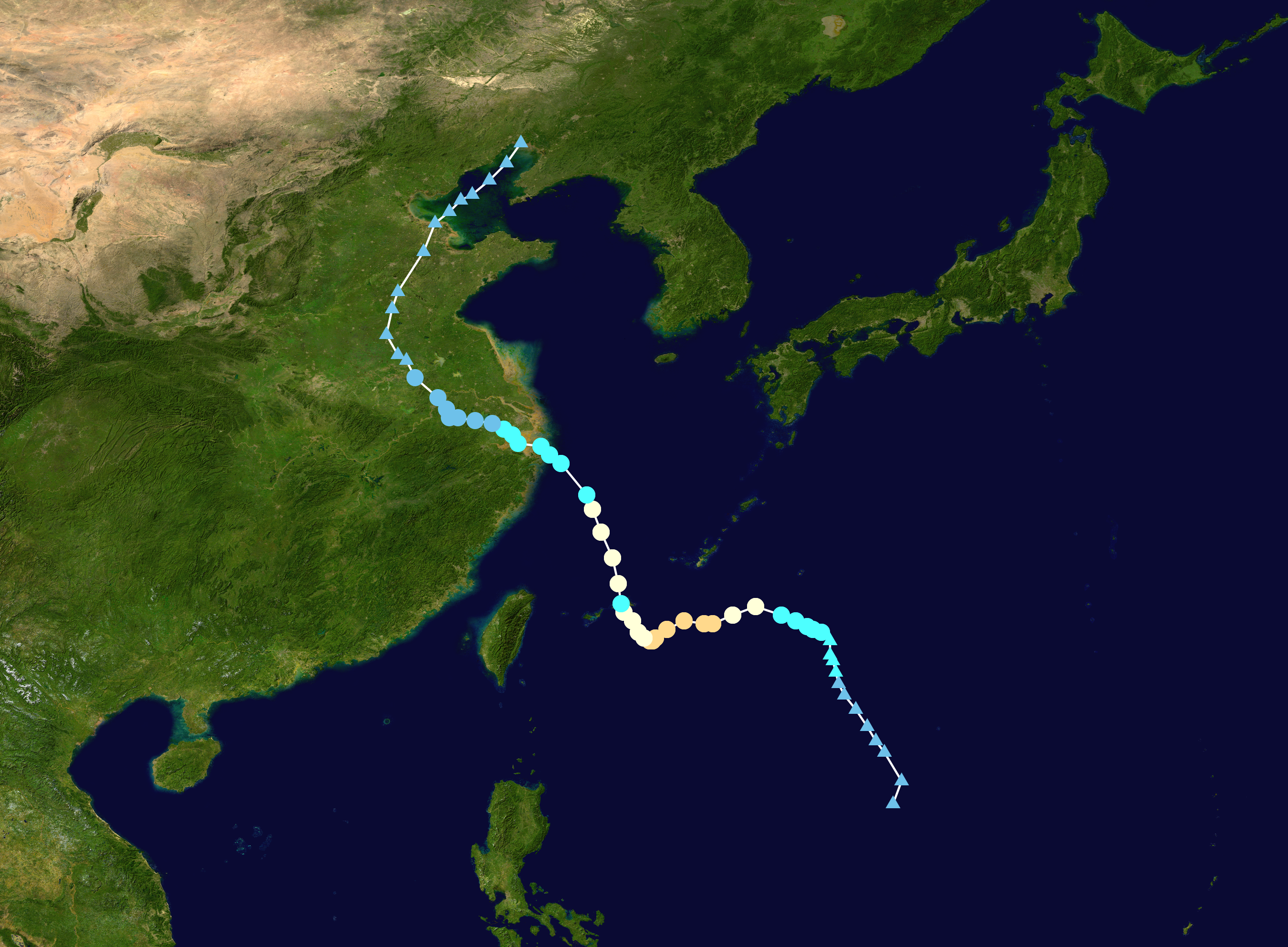
Map plotting the storm's track and intensity, according to the Saffir–Simpson scale Map key Saffir–Simpson scale Tropical depression (≤38 mph, ≤62 km/h) Tropical storm (39–73 mph, 63–118 km/h) Category 1 (74–95 mph, 119–153 km/h) Category 2 (96–110 mph, 154–177 km/h) Category 3 (111–129 mph, 178–208 km/h) Category 4 (130–156 mph, 209–251 km/h) Category 5 (≥157 mph, ≥252 km/h) Unknown Storm type Tropical cyclone Subtropical cyclone Extratropical cyclone, remnant low, tropical disturbance, or monsoon depression

=== Origins ===
At 06:00 UTC of July 14, the Joint Typhoon Warning Center (JTWC) (Note: The Joint Typhoon Warning Center is a joint United States Navy – United States Air Force task force that issues tropical cyclone warnings for the western Pacific Ocean and other regions.) started to monitor a persistent area of convection, roughly associated with a low-level circulation center, located 484 nmi (895 km; 555 mi) west-northwest of Guam. The disturbance was located in an environment conducive for tropical cyclogenesis, with warm 30–31 °C (86–88 °F) sea surface temperatures and good equatorial outflow due to a favorable configuration of an upper low over the western part of the mainland Japan and a tropical upper tropospheric trough (TUTT) to the northwest. Later, it moved through an area of moderate wind shear which made the system's LLC broad while moving west-northwestward: the wind gradient slowly became conducive for the disturbance to slowly intensify. At 20:30 UTC of the next day, the agency upgraded the system's potential trend of intensification to "high" and issued the disturbance's Tropical Cyclone Formation Alert (TCFA).

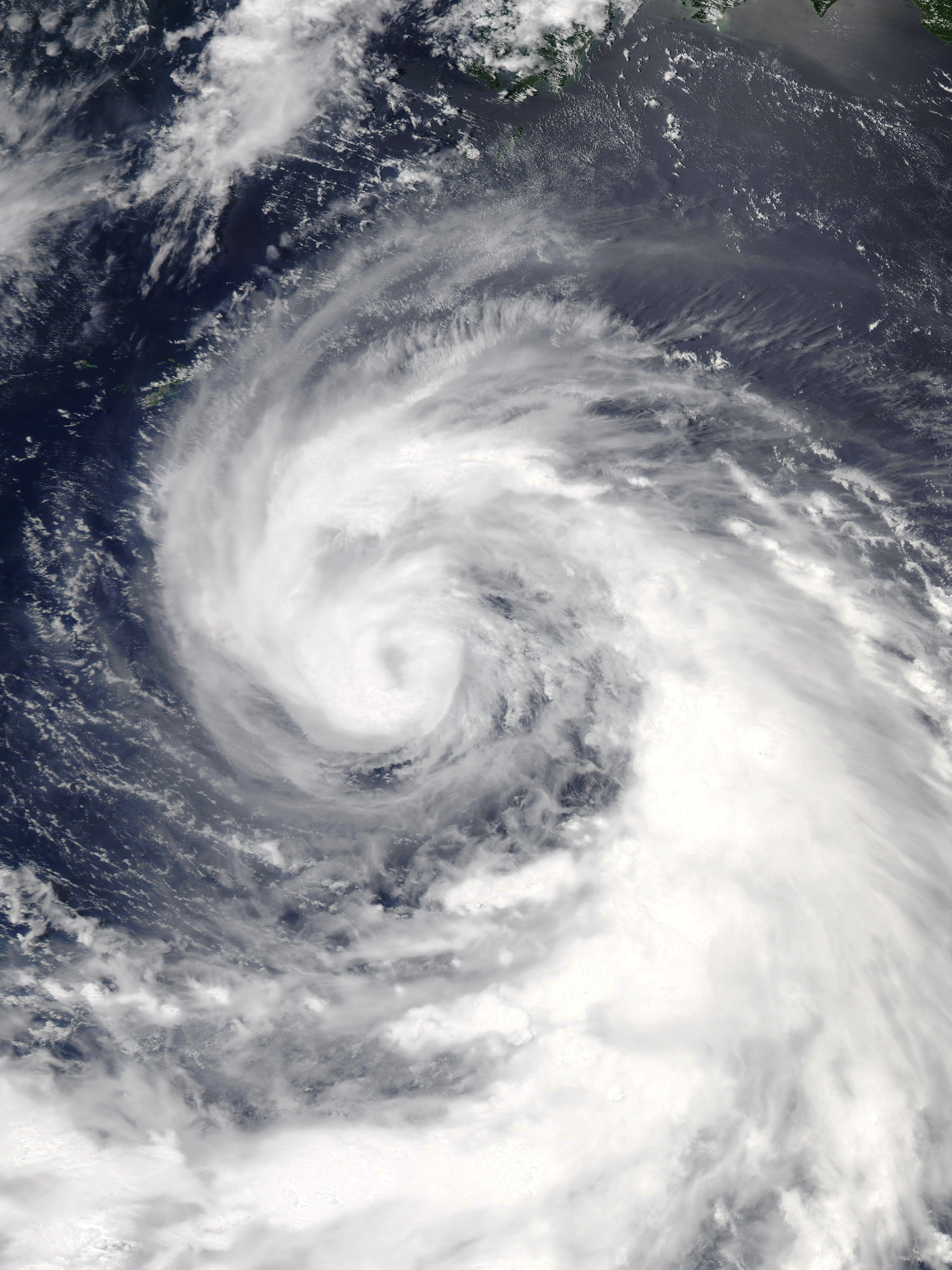
In-fa as a severe tropical storm on July 19

At 00:00 UTC, the Japan Meteorological Agency (JMA) upgraded the disturbance to a depression, (Note: The Japan Meteorological Agency is the official Regional Specialized Meteorological Center for the western Pacific Ocean.) followed by the PAGASA's designation of the system as Tropical Depression Fabian as it was now inside of the Philippine Area of Responsibility, being the sixth tropical cyclone in the region in the season, three hours later and the JTWC at 09:00 UTC. Located in a complex steering environment, the storm resembled a monsoon depression at that time while moving slowly northwestward before turning northward, both steered by the western periphery of a deep-layered subtropical ridge to the east. Later, a pocket of dry air from the western semicircle and upper-level westerlies disrupted the system, with the LLC becoming broad and exposed while slowly and steadily intensifying, with the evidence of cooling cloud tops. In addition, the depression was being moved northwestward by a compound monsoon gyre pattern and at the same time, a near-equatorial ridge before being guided by another subtropical ridge to the east of Honshu, still caught under a weak steering flow. Four hours later, the PAGASA further designated Fabian to a tropical storm and being followed by the JMA at 18:00 UTC that day, being assigned the name In-fa. The JTWC did the same at 03:00 UTC on July 18, with the storm remaining slow in motion due to now-weakening westerlies. The PAGASA, meanwhile, reported that the system further intensified to a severe tropical storm at that time. Although the low-level circulation center remained exposed while moving to the north-northwest, animated multispectral imageries on that day revealed a well-defined LLC with a symmetric area of large convection on the western edge and further centered on the central core.

=== Intensification ===
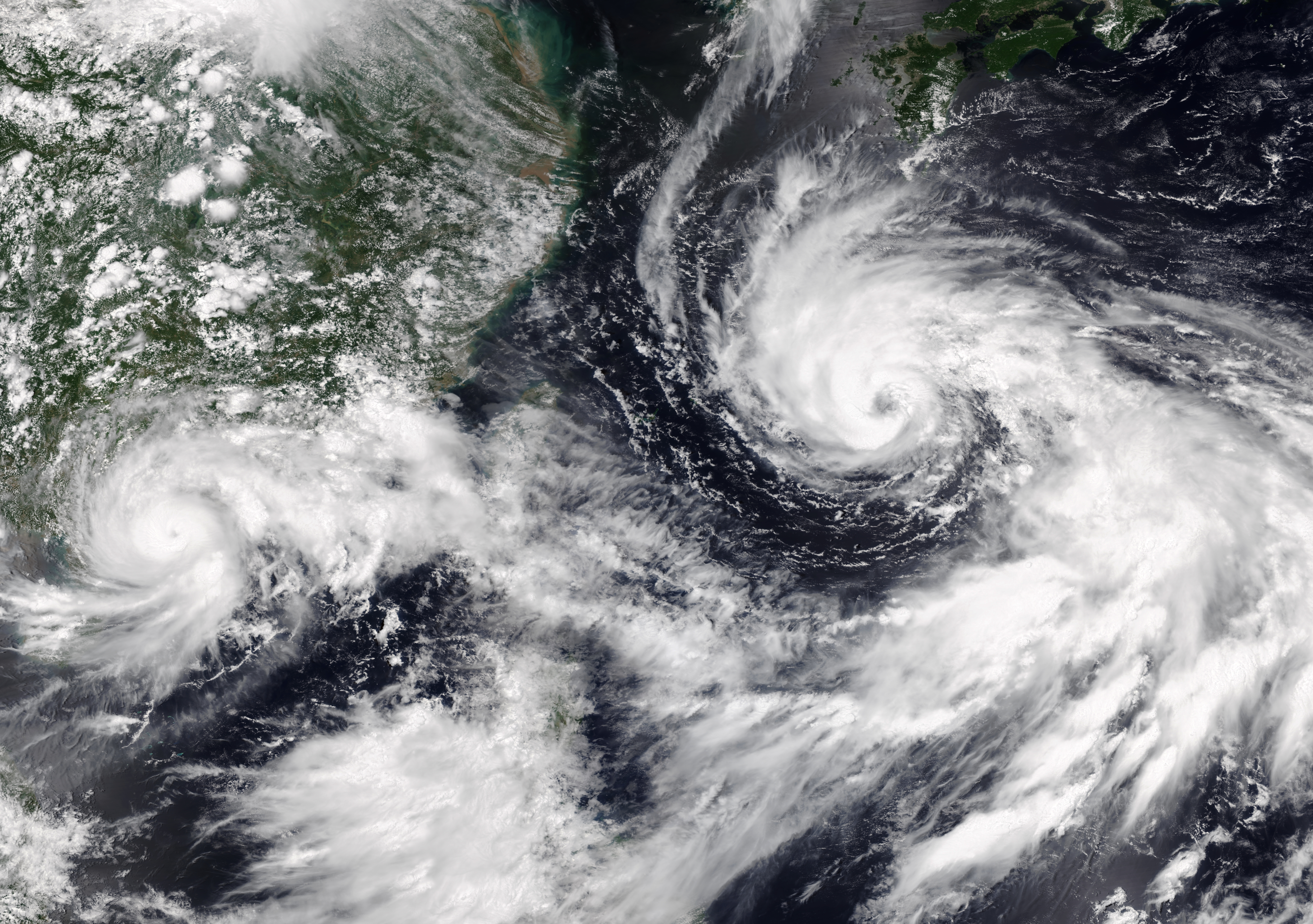
Two simultaneous tropical cyclones on July 20, Typhoon Cempaka (left) and In-fa (right).

The large size of In-fa, combined with the continuous dry air entrainment, together restrained the system's rapid development over the warm waters of the Philippine Sea; however, as the storm continued its trajectory towards the Ryukyu Islands, the curved banding of the system further consolidated on its and a microwave eye feature started to emerge. At the same time, the system began to take a northwest track before moving west-northwestward under a subtropical ridge over Japan by the early hours of July 19. At 00:00 UTC that day, the JMA further upgraded In-fa to a severe tropical storm. The system, decelerates again as it started to impact the Ryukyu's, with In-fa's convection or thunderstorms deepening and an eye further appearing. Six hours later, the PAGASA reported in their bulletins that In-fa further became a typhoon, while located approximately 895 kilometres to the east of extreme Northern Luzon. The JTWC followed suit at 09:00 UTC that day and the JMA, three hours later. As it passed south of Daito Islands, a 35-nautical-mile (65 km; 40 mi) eye was further evident on satellite imageries, which later shrunk; however, In-fa remained a high-end Category 1 system as it started to move westward and later, a west-southwest track. As the eye started to enlarge again, with the Dvorak countings of T4.5-T5.0, the JTWC further upgraded In-fa to a mid-level Category 2 typhoon at 03:00 UTC on July 21 with winds of 175 km/h (110 mph); this made the system's peak intensity according to the JTWC's estimates.

Radar imagery from Okinawa Island showed a large and clear eye, though at the same time, another satellite imagery revealed an eyewall that was disrupted due to continuous dry air intrusions while moving westward. Later, as it shifted its motion west-southwestward, In-fa's eye became ragged due to another intrusion of dry air. Furthermore, dry northerlies suppressed the system as it dived southward. At 03:00 UTC of the next day, In-fa started an eyewall replacement cycle while its northern quadrant started to weaken as it changed its motion yet again to the south-southwest. In addition, the system is being steered by the southern periphery of a high-amplitude ridge over the Sea of Japan. Six hours later, the typhoon started to weaken with its eye expanding and weakening banding on the system while tracking westward and further, northwestward at a slow motion rate. Its steering movements were caused by a subtropical ridge to the north and another one over the east coast of North Korea. As it continued to approach the Ryukyus while traveling from the northwest, In-fa further weakened to a high-level Category 1 system due to continuous upwelling, its suppressed outflow and slowly cooling sea surface temperatures. By 15:00 UTC of July 23, In-fa passed between the Tarama Island and Miyako-jima Island, with its remaining large eye passing over the latter as it slightly shifted its movement towards the north-northwest. The system further degraded to a tropical storm according to the estimates of JTWC, six hours later as it slowly moved away from the Ryukyu Islands and the convection on the eye was not continuous while subsequently entering the East China Sea. By 03:00 UTC on the next day, In-fa reintensified to a low-end Category 1 system as it reformed its convective depths and continued to maintain a ragged eye while moving northward. Six hours later (23:00 PST of July 23), In-fa left the PAR, with the PAGASA issuing its last bulletin while located, 640 kilometres to the north-northeast of Itbayat, Batanes. The JMA then analysed that In-fa further reached its peak with maximum sustained winds of 150 km/h (90 mph) and a minimum barometric pressure of 950 hPa (28.05 inHg), three hours later.

=== China landfalls and demise ===
In-fa started to move north-northwestward under the periphery of a mid-level ridge over the Sea of Japan as it started to remain at a low-end Category 1 intensity due to continuous marginal waters and upwelling. At 04:30 UTC on the next day, the system made its first landfall in the eastern Chinese province of Zhejiang, over Putuo District, a major port area in the city of Zhoushan. Four and a half hours later, the JTWC quickly downgraded the system to a tropical storm as its eye became ill-defined and the central dense overcast further became evident on satellite imageries instead of the former. The JMA, in the other hand reported that the storm weakened to a severe tropical storm in their analysis, another four hours later. Although tracking inland south of Shanghai, In-fa's overall structure remained compact and its gale-force winds further expanded, although as it reentered the East China Sea from Zhoushan, the core of the system slowly eroded. At 01:30 UTC of July 26, the large storm made its second coastal landfall over Pinghu, Jiaxing with maximum sustained winds of 40 knots (75 km/h; 45 mph) from the west-northwest. Shortly after the landfall, the JTWC discontinued warnings on In-fa as it had moved well inland, having no chances to redevelop. In their last warning on the system, the agency assessed the system as a weak tropical storm. Meanwhile, the JMA downgraded the system to a tropical storm by 12:00 UTC of that day due to further weakening of the storm by the means of land interaction. At 00:00 UTC of the next day, the JMA reported that In-fa further degraded to a tropical depression while moving west-northwest, with its center located at Shou County, Anhui Province. Over the next few days, it moved north and subsequently entered Shandong before turning north-northeast while subsequently slowing down. By 06:00 UTC of July 29, the system turned northward yet again before being further downgraded by JMA as a low-pressure area, twelve hours later as it shifted its movement northeastward. The remnants of In-fa entered the Bohai Sea later that night.

== Preparations ==
The threat of storm surge and high waves caused concern for those out at sea.

=== Japan ===
In the Ryukyu Islands, the Okinawa Meteorological Observatory held a meeting on July 17 to discuss the storm, warning people to be cautious of the approaching system. Strong winds and heavy rains were also expected due to the storm. In addition, wave warnings were also issued by the JMA from different meteorological stations in the Japanese island group particularly in the islands of Okinawa, Miyako Islands and Amami Islands, while lightning and wind warnings was placed on Daitō Islands due to the approaching system. Later, sea warnings and alerts were imposed in these areas, including the East China Sea and further on the coastal areas of Kagoshima Prefecture and the island of Shikoku. Rainfall amounts up to 50 mm (2.0 in) were forecasted in the area, 100 mm (3.9 in) - 200 mm (7.9 in) in the main island of Okinawa and 100 mm (3.9 in) - 150 mm (5.9 in) in the Maejima Islands. The Sakishima Islands were forecast to get up to 180 mm (7.1 in) of rain.

A school in Kitadaitō, Okinawa was temporarily closed due to the storm while roadways on the village were shut down, starting on July 19. Marine activities in the area were also affected, with fishermen forced to tie their boats as they cannot fish due to In-fa. Sugarcane industries also feared that they will run out of food supply in their area due to the ongoing cancellation of vessels. Japan Airlines, Ryukyu Air Commuter, Japan Transocean Air, All Nippon Airways, Jetstar Japan canceled their flights in different airports across the Ryukyus and mainland Japan which were expected to affect over 16,600 people. In addition, the Okinawa Passenger Ship Association reported that 50 ships were also halted to bound across the mainland due to the storm. The city of Nanjō also postponed their vaccination activities from July 21–23 as the storm neared.

=== Philippines ===
Despite the depression being far away from any landmasses in the Philippines, the storm (locally known as Fabian in the country) was forecasted to enhance the prevailing southwest monsoon, causing rains over Luzon and the Visayas. Brought by the enhanced southwest monsoon from the system and Cempaka, heavy rainfall warnings were put in effect by PAGASA for Metro Manila and several other provinces nearby. As the typhoon moved southwest towards the Philippine Sea, PAGASA raised Signal No. 1 warning for islands of Batanes and Babuyan for preparation of strong winds and heavy rainfall.

=== Taiwan ===
The Central Weather Bureau issued a heavy rainfall warning for Kaohsiung, Pingtung County and the Hengchun Peninsula, and a sea warning for the northern and eastern coasts of the country as In-fa's periphery neared; the former was canceled at 02:05 UTC (10:05 TST). The mountainous terrain of Taiwan was warned to lead to catastrophic flooding and landslides due to the rainfall that In-Fa may bring. Up to 12 to 20 inches of rainfall was forecasted. By the evening of July 21, the CWB issued a sea warning for the country. On the next day, a heavy rain advisory was issued by the CWB for the northern portion of the country (except Yilan County) and later, the area was further included. COVID-19 vaccination appointments were also canceled on July 23 due to the storm. Different offices and schools in the northwest portion of the country were forced to close temporarily due to the threats of landslides and heavy rains. The sea warning was lifted on July 24 as In-fa veered away from the country.

=== China ===
"We will make every effort to ensure the safety of people's lives and property, and do everything to minimize disaster losses, and strive to achieve the goal of no deaths and few injuries and economic losses,"

— Yuan Jiajun, Zhejiang province Communist Party secretary, during an inspection of preparations on July 24.

The China Meteorological Administration (CMA) issued a blue typhoon warning for the eastern part of the country on July 22 as In-fa approached, which were later upgraded to an orange warning on the next day. The need for food and water was in high demand.

Typhoon In-fa nearing landfall in China on July 24.

Maximum rainfall totals of 460–610 mm (18–24 in) were forecasted, along with 100–130 km/h (62–81 mph) wind gusts. An isolated area of 1,220 mm (48 in) was forecasted for areas in Zhejiang and Jiangsu. Widespread damage mostly due to flooding was of particular concern, and many power outages were expected. Low-lying beaches were also a source of worry, due to high storm surge possibly eroding and severely damaging them. Possible impacts were said to be "catastrophic". Port operations in Shanghai and Ningbo were also forecasted to possibly be temporarily stopped.

Several dams and reservoirs had been drained in preparation in Zhejiang, and the province upgraded its emergency response for In-fa to level 3. Up to 510 mm (20 in) of rain was expected for many areas of China. Over 100 trains were cancelled, and other ports and railways were shut down temporarily. Officials in Shanghai warned residents to stay inside, closing down various parks and museums. They advised against large-scale gatherings. All container ship docks were shut down in Yangshan port south of Shanghai, with 150 vessels being evacuated from the area. Shanghai also canceled international flights due to In-fa. At least 815,000 people have been evacuated by the 2021 Henan floods, which partly related to Typhoon In-fa.

It was estimated that over 200 million people were at risk of Typhoon In-fa's impacts, including almost all to all of Shanghai's population. Officials feared that In-fa's impacts would hamper any ongoing recovery efforts from the flooding. Mudslides were also of concern. It was advised for coastal areas to "guard against the combined impact of 'wind, rain, and tides'". Shanghai Disneyland was closed from July 25 to the next day. About 330,000 residents of Fengxian District were evacuated when wind speeds reached over 90 km/h (56 mph) on July 25. Hundreds of other flights at Shanghai Pudong and Hongqiao, with more expected to be canceled on the 26th. The riverfront Bund district, a major tourist area, was closed. All in all, over 1.5 million people were evacuated. Six large construction projects had their personnel evacuated.

== Impact ==
Overall, In-fa caused widespread impacts across several countries due to its large size and area of effect. Flooding of some kind had affected a myriad of provinces, prefectures, and regions in countries, with thousands of buildings being damaged in some way over the course of the typhoon, along with severe impacts to agriculture. Winds exacerbated much of the destruction In-fa brought.

=== Japan ===
Rough waves started to impact the coastal areas of the Daitō Islands, starting on July 18. Rains began to pound Minamidaitō and Kitadaitōjima on July 19 while gusts of 25 m/s (90 km/h) were also reported. On July 21, sustained winds of 34 knots (65 km/h; 40 mph) with gusts of 42 knots (80 km/h; 50 mph) were felt over Kadena Air Base. Three days later, gusts of 36.5 m/s (130 km/h) were reported on Kumejima Airport. Kumejima collected 310.5 mm (12.22 in) on that day and 286.5 mm (11.28 in) on Kumejima-cho.

An office in Nanjō suffered power, internet signal and telecommunication loss due to In-fa, while a disaster headquarters at Naha urged people to evacuate as the conditions started to become rough as the storm neared. Winds up to 32.1 miles per hour (50 km/h) were recorded on Nanjō on the early hours of July 21, 28.1 miles per hour (45 km/h) at Uruma and 26.9 miles per hour (45 km/h) at Naha, enough to down power lines that affected 860 people in the main island of Okinawa and the villages of Iheya and Izena as of July 21 and many sugarcane crops. A vinyl house was reported to have collapsed in Yonagusuku, Yaese, while a telephone line in Nanjō City office were cut due to the storm. 4,720 households ran out of power on July 23, according to the Okinawa Electric Power. A stone pile, which were around for 10 years also collapsed and the 250-year old historic Nakadou no San-ban Akou tree's large branches in Ishigaki Island were downed due to strong winds from In-fa. Walls of an empty building were also crumbled by heavy rains and further fell on the streets; no one was reported to be injured.

According to authorities, a death from In-fa was reported on the next day when an individual discovered a male security guard bleeding; the person was rushed to the hospital but recorded "dead on the spot" according to authorities. Nine individuals were reported injured in the other hand, including an elderly woman on July 20 when she fell in the parking lot of a hotel in Minama, Chatan and two more in Miyako-jima. Damages in Okinawa Island and Daitō Islands totaled JP¥46.5 million (US$421,000), with the majority are due to sugarcane losses. Total agricultural loss across Okinawa Prefecture fell at JP¥430 million (US$3.89 million).

=== Philippines ===
Heavy rainfall was recorded by the PAGASA as In-fa together with Cempaka influenced the southwest monsoon in the country. From July 20 until the next day, Iba in Zambales recorded 198 mm (7.8 in), Subic Bay - 163 mm (6.4 in), Port Area in Manila - 124 mm (4.9 in) and Sangley Point in Cavite City - 101.4 mm (3.99 in). From July 19–23, Iba recorded 711.5 mm (28.01 in) of rainfall, Abucay in Bataan at 626.0 mm (24.65 in), Subic Bay at 544.7 mm (21.44 in) and Baguio at 447.8 mm (17.63 in).

Some roadways in Metro Manila were flooded in the early hours of July 21 due to the prolonged rains; however, the Metropolitan Manila Development Authority (MMDA) reported that the existing floods were only gutter and knee-deep. Light vehicles were stranded as a result. In addition, the Supreme Court of the Philippines suspended its work on that day due to the floods. The Prinza Dam San Nicolas 1's waters in Cavite were confirmed to be overflowed, also in that day. Two fishermen in Calatagan, Batangas were rescued by authorities when their motor banca capsized in the rough waters. Continuous rainfall in Zambales caused 11 families in Castillejos to evacuate while a landslide triggered another four to leave their shelters in Olongapo. Widespread flooding also forced the cancellations of work in Freeport Area of Bataan and other government-related services in the area. Different rivers in Pampanga overflowed due to downpours, while 25 COVID-19 patients in Batac, Ilocos Norte were relocated from a makeshift hospital to a different area due to the worsening rain conditions. On July 24, the Marikina River overflowed its banks, reaching 16 meters high as the combined effects of In-fa and the southwest monsoon continued to pour rainfall over the region.

5 deaths were reported due to In-fa in the country, with two in Aguilar, Pangasinan when they were caught up in a swelling river, two more in Ilocos Region due to lightning strikes and the other in a vehicular accident in Kennon Road. In the accident, two more were also injured. 202,213 individuals (50,676 families) and 480 barangays across Luzon and Visayas were reported by the NDRRMC to be affected by the southwest monsoon rains, while damages from agriculture sectors were estimated to be ₱100 million (US$1.98 million). Infrastructure damages were ₱2.4 million (US$47,707).

572 houses were damaged, with 447 partially and 143 totally. 26 cities and municipalities experienced power interruption of some sort. Seven ports were rendered inoperational. 72,239 people were displaced. 38,472 people were placed in 365 evacuation centers.

=== Taiwan ===
The large circulation of In-fa caused heavy rains in Taiwan, causing numerous landslides and rockfalls. Trees were downed due to strong winds, damaging cars and disrupting traffics. Power outages were also reported in Shilin and Beitou districts. Many boats and ships stranded in the seas off the country were escorted to ports to shelter from In-fa. From July 21–22, Hsinchu County recorded 269.5 mm (10.61 in) amount of rainfall, Miaoli County at 208.5 mm (8.21 in) and Yilan County at 199 mm (7.8 in). 5 meters of waves were seen on Matsu Islands, in the other hand. From July 21–24, Mt. Niaozui in Hsinchu County collected 714.5 mm (28.13 in) amount of rain and Yangmingshan, Taipei City reported 485.5 mm (19.11 in) at the same period.

=== China ===
==== Pre-landfall ====
The airflow and moisture from In-fa caused record-high rainfall and devastating floods in Henan, killing 302 people and 50 were missing, 14 of whom in a flooded metro line in Zhengzhou. A subtropical high was combined with In-fa to create large quantities of atmospheric water in the province. The phenomenon was compounded by the topography in Zhengzhou. A years worth of rain fell in the city in just over 3 days. At least 215,200 hectares have been damaged. Over 90 villages were flooded in the city of Xinxiang. A dam on the Wei River had reportedly burst on the morning of 23 July.

The floods caused 29 of the 30 reservoirs in Zhengzhou to overflow. Many areas were clogged with mud-like material, and many more embankments had been breached. Some people were trapped without food or water for up to a couple of days. The floods have caused over 69 deaths and the estimated damage is upwards of 82 billion Yuan ($12.7 billion). At least 1.1 million were relocated, and over 9.3 million people had been affected. Its likely that up to tens of millions have been affected. The Jiangguang Road Tunnel flooded in just over five minutes during extreme rainfall, with hundreds of vehicles being trapped. A bridge in an area also collapsed.

==== Landfall ====
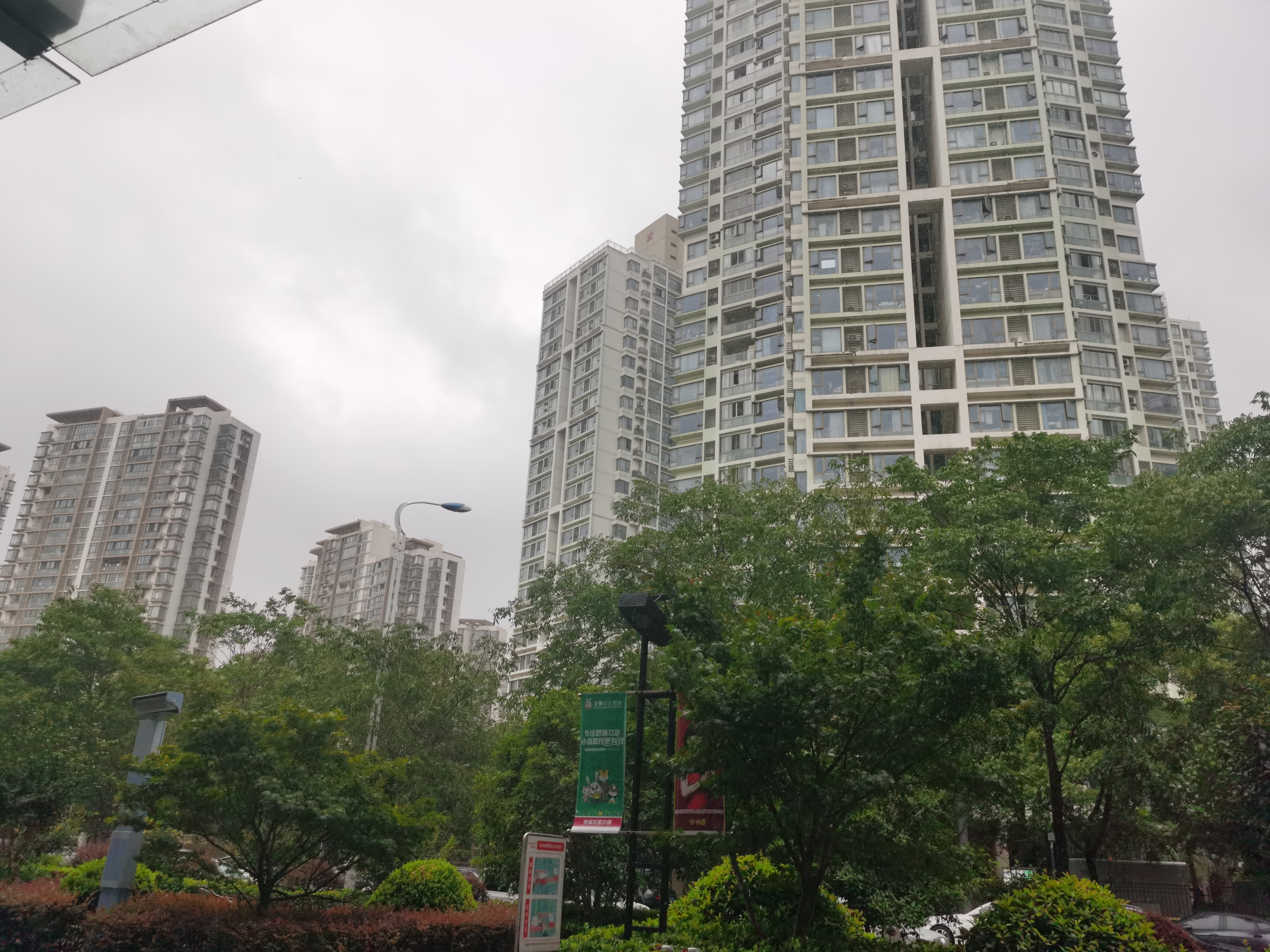
Overcast skies associated with In-fa at Suzhou Industrial Park hours before the storm made landfall

Wettest tropical cyclones and their remnants in Mainland China Highest-known totals
Precipitation			Storm	Location	Ref.
Rank	mm	in	Storm	Location	Ref.
1	1629.0	64.13	Nina 1975	Banqiao Dam	
2	951.0	37.4	In-fa 2021	Yuyao	
3	831.1	32.72	Fitow 2001	Changjiang County	
4	806.0	31.73	Soudelor 2015	Wenzhou	
5	744.8	29.32	Doksuri 2023	Wangjiayuan Reservoir	
6	662.0	26.01	Chanthu 2021	Dinghai District, Zhoushan	
7	600.0	24.00	Haikui 2012	Anhui Province	
8	555.0	21.85	Chanchu 2006	Zhangpu County	

Coastal villages and towns experienced major flooding problems due the motion of In-fa. Subway networks had their above-ground operations and routes suspended, along with roads inundated in many areas. An overpass' roof outside of a subway station blew off, which landed on a train connection grid, causing traffic disruptions. Workers in many businesses and jobs had problems presented to them due to trouble getting to their offices from In-fa's winds and torrential rainfall. Much of Shanghai was shut down. The municipal Meteorological Bureau said the city received over 100 mm (3.9 in) of rainfall from July 25 to 26, nearly beating the total rainfall for the city (120 mm) in July in just one day. The municipal's anti-flood commanding office reported that among the 654 meteorological monitoring stations around the city, 30 recorded 70 mm (2.8 in) of rainfall in 12 hours. 311 more saw 30–69 mm (1.2–2.7 in) of rainfall in 12 hours. A meteorological station at Dalan, Yuyao reported a rain accumulation of over 951 mm (37.4 in) from July 22–26, an equivalent of 37 West Lakes. More than 4,700 trees were uprooted. Pudong and Minhang districts experienced power outages and other issues.

Warehouses in Zhengzhou were forced to stop container loading, as well as deliveries to terminals. A large amount of cargo stuck at Pudong, according to Metro Shipping, with weather conditions preventing carriers to recover the material. Traffic and road transport had been affected by flooding in the whole region, with at least 6 km of road inundated by storm surge. A rail freight train going from China to Europe was disrupted while cargo was being reconfigured to other substitute terminals, adding pressure to already heavy-hit shipping industry. Rail, air, and ocean freight was also disrupted. In Shanghai, 268 signs and billboards were felled by July 26. Many businesses were temporarily closed due to the storm while nearly 500,000 people were moved to shelters on the same day. 12,700 people were also still out of power, with upwards of 100,000 without power in total. Losses to agriculture were expected to be heavy.

Several meter-high waves were reported on the Qiantang river in Haining. Heavy rain and gales also affected coastal areas in Qidong, Jiangsu, damaging properties there. The six ultra-large offshore engineering platforms that were under construction were also affected by In-fa. Waterlogging was recorded in streets in Shanghai. Pictures showed floodwaters reaching the tops of cars. Up to 300 mm (12 in) of rainfall fell in Jiangsu province. An underground parking structure was flooded. The Chinese government estimated the total damage of In-fa to be 13.2 billion yuan (US$2.04 billion).

== Aftermath ==
=== Philippines ===
$58,200 worth of Family Food Packs were distrusted to the affected population in Calabarzon, Central Luzon, Mimaropa, and Western Visayas on July 26. $16.6 million worth of quick response funds were put in place, and $3.3 million was set aside for future packs. Local disaster management authorities closely worked with government units to help with recovery.

=== China ===
There were questions about China's preparedness for damaging meteorological events in the country due to climate change.

As the floods began to slowly abate before the typhoon's landfall, authorities gradually came to help clean up the floods. Li Changxun, a Henan emergency response official, stated on July 24 that the province would need a large-scale cleaning and disinfecting to prevent epidemics after floods (the “epidemic” here refers to common outbreaks that always happen after floods, not related to COVID-19). Various pictures published by state media and government social media accounts on the same day showed workers shoveling mud and removing uprooted trees. At least 12,000 temporary shelters had opened across Zhejiang Province. Emergency anti-typhoon vessels were put in place to protect the six construction projects, including two high-horsepower tugboats. Strengthening to chains and cables was also done. As of July 25, a total of 97,915 people were evacuated to safe areas in Jiangsu when the typhoon hit. Photos that surfaced showed migrant workers in shelters during In-fa.

Due to In-fa's impacts, Salmon's prices in Shanghai had jumped to 135 yuan ($20.75) per kilogram. Firefighters rescued those who had been trapped by flooding in Zheijang province. Footage showed firefighters saving 45 trapped locals. Another part of the video was released that showed crews saving a motorist trapped in an overturned vehicle. Various pumps were used to drain out rainwater from floods in Weihui city. Health authorities started a campaign on July 28 to help Mosquito prevention. Due to In-fa's flooding bringing highly moist conditions, many areas became ripe breeding grounds for the insects. It was said to be going from July 29 to 31. Wet markets, old residential complexes, and construction sites were of particular concern.

Coal mining in the country was prioritized after the typhoon made landfall, due to large-scale blackouts. State run miners had collectively sent increased supplies of thermal coal to 27 different power plants around Henan province. Over 340,000 tons of thermal coal reached the province during July 26, highly exceeding the daily amount needed. Coal operations were also quickened in other regions, such as the Yangtze River Delta Area. Footage released by Jiangsu Fire shows efforts by rescue crews to drain floodwater around the province.

China's top economic planner collected 795 million yuan ($122.4 million) for reconstruction in regions of several provinces impacted by the typhoon and floods. Earlier, China allocated over 3 billion yuan to help support flood control and disaster recovery.

== See also ==
- Weather of 2021
- Tropical cyclones in 2021
- Typhoon Lekima
- Typhoon Morakot
- Typhoon Rananim
