= Typhoon Cempaka =

Pacific typhoon in 2021

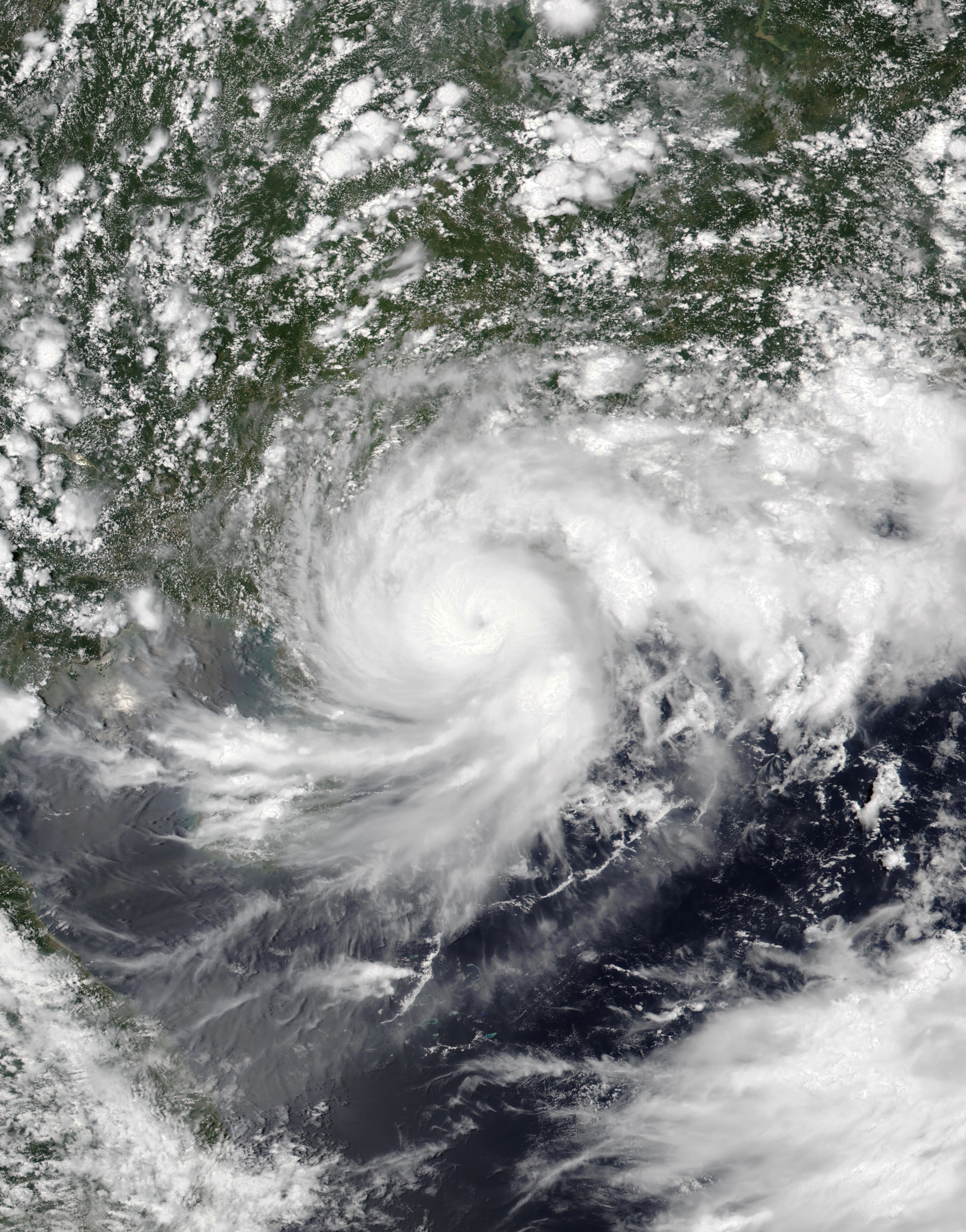
- Cempaka at peak intensity on July 20

Meteorological history
- Formed: July 17, 2021
- Dissipated: July 25, 2021

Typhoon
- 10-minute sustained (JMA)
- Highest winds: 130 km/h (80 mph)
- Lowest pressure: 980 hPa (mbar); 28.94 inHg

Category 1-equivalent typhoon
- 1-minute sustained (SSHWS/JTWC)
- Highest winds: 150 km/h (90 mph)
- Lowest pressure: 965 hPa (mbar); 28.50 inHg

Overall effects
- Fatalities: 3
- Damage: $4.25 million (2021 USD)
- Areas affected: Guangdong, Guangxi, Hainan, Hong Kong, Macau, and Vietnam
- IBTrACS
- Part of the 2021 Pacific typhoon season

Typhoon Cempaka (Note: The name Cempaka (Malay: cempaka, [t͡ʃəmpakə]) was contributed by Malaysia and means champak (Magnolia champaca) in Malay.) was a moderately-strong, slow-moving and fairly long-lived tropical cyclone that caused substantial damage in China and Vietnam toward the end of July 2021. The seventh named storm and the fourth typhoon of the 2021 Pacific typhoon season, the storm formed from a tropical disturbance west of the Philippines on July 17. Around the same time, the JMA recognized the system as a tropical depression, with the JTWC issuing a TCFA for the disturbance. The storm slowly moved northwestward towards China, and on July 19, the system strengthened into a tropical storm and was given the name Cempaka by the JMA. On the next day, Cempaka reached its peak intensity, peaking as a Category 1-equivalent typhoon, before making landfall on China later that day. Afterward, Cempaka rapidly weakened as it moved inland, weakening into a tropical depression on July 21. The storm subsequently initiated a counterclockwise loop, moving westward across southern China, and turning southward and emerging into the Gulf of Tonkin on July 23. Afterward, Cempaka turned eastward for the next few days, before dissipating over southern Hainan on July 26.

== Meteorological history ==
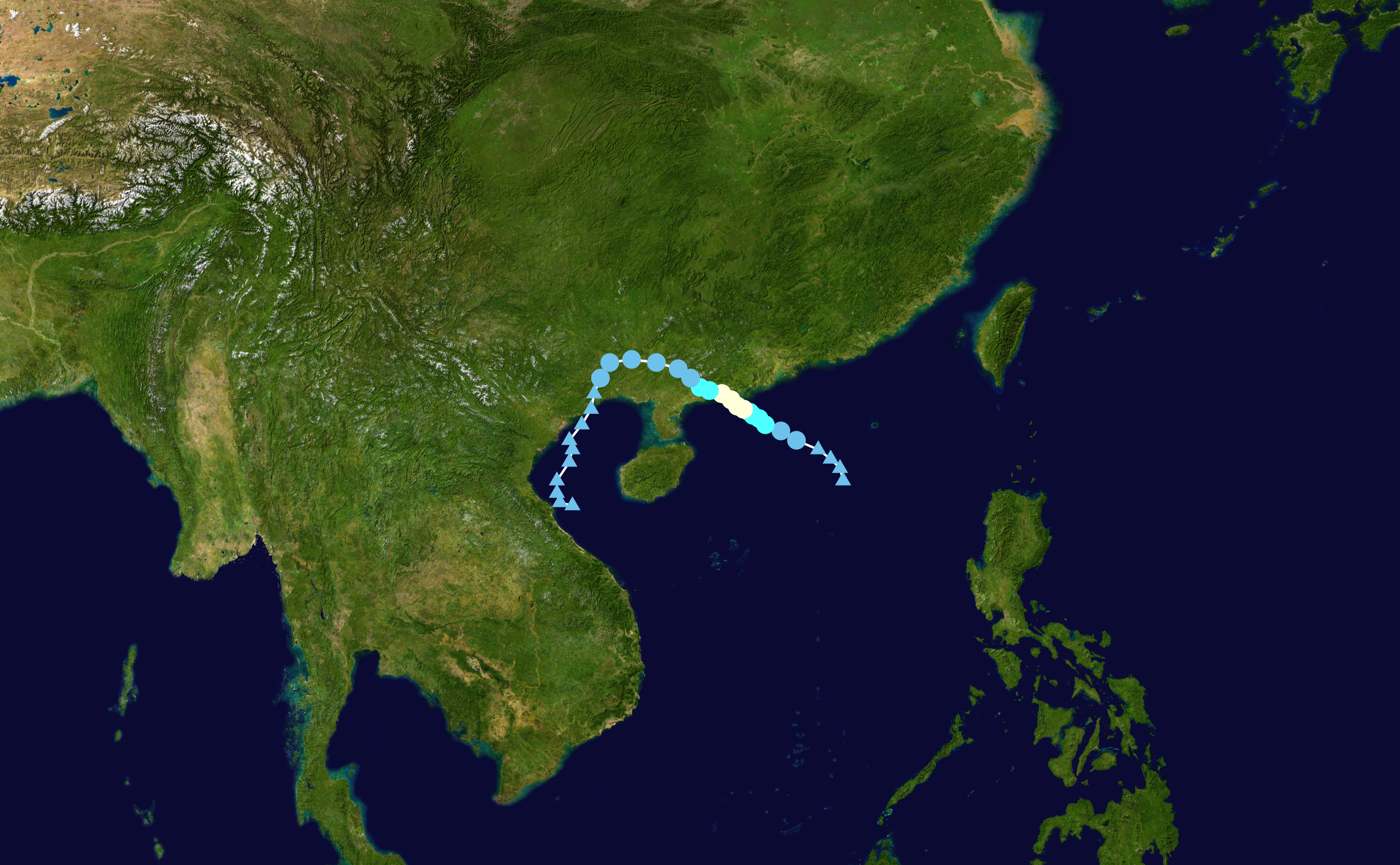
Map plotting the storm's track and intensity, according to the Saffir–Simpson scale Map key Saffir–Simpson scale Tropical depression (≤38 mph, ≤62 km/h) Tropical storm (39–73 mph, 63–118 km/h) Category 1 (74–95 mph, 119–153 km/h) Category 2 (96–110 mph, 154–177 km/h) Category 3 (111–129 mph, 178–208 km/h) Category 4 (130–156 mph, 209–251 km/h) Category 5 (≥157 mph, ≥252 km/h) Unknown Storm type Tropical cyclone Subtropical cyclone Extratropical cyclone, remnant low, tropical disturbance, or monsoon depression

At 18:00 UTC on July 16, the Japan Meteorological Agency (JMA) (Note: The Japan Meteorological Agency is the official Regional Specialized Meteorological Center for the western Pacific Ocean.) started to monitor a tropical disturbance that formed in the South China Sea, west of the Philippines. Moving westward and later to the west-northwest, the system further intensified to a tropical depression and was designated as Invest 99W by the Joint Typhoon Warning Center (JTWC) (Note: The Joint Typhoon Warning Center is a joint United States Navy – United States Air Force task force that issues tropical cyclone warnings for the western Pacific Ocean and other regions.) two hours later, with its development chances being "low". Located approximately 224 nmi (415 km; 260 mi) to the south-southeast of Hong Kong, multispectral satellite imagery on the disturbance revealed a broad low-level circulation center with flaring convection (or thunderstorms) over the center. Analysis on the conditions in the South China Sea depicted a favorable environment for development, with warm sea surface temperatures up to 31–32 °C (88–90 °F) and good radial outflow, being inhibited by low to moderate amounts of wind shear. The system's tropical cyclone development potential was later upgraded to medium, and by 23:00 UTC, the JTWC issued a Tropical Cyclone Formation Alert for the system as the system became more organized. By the next day, the JTWC had upgraded the system to a tropical depression, designating it as 10W, since it had an improved convective structure and had developed a defined low level circulation. The JTWC upgraded the system to a tropical storm, as its low-level circulation center had organized more, with improved banding structure. At 00:00 UTC the next day, the JMA upgraded the system to a tropical storm and assigned the name Cempaka. At 21:00 UTC, the JTWC declared Cempaka to be a Category 1 typhoon, as it developed a 15 nmi (28 km; 17 mi) wide ragged eye. The JMA later upgraded it to a severe tropical storm at 00:00 UTC on the next day. In their post-storm analysis, the JMA determined that Cempaka attained typhoon intensity on the same day. The storm made landfall near Yangjiang, on July 20, and subsequently rapidly weakened into a tropical depression on July 21. For the next few days, the system moved southwestward, crossed Móng Cái City, Quảng Ninh Province in Vietnam on the night of July 22 and then moving into the Gulf of Tonkin on July 23. Afterward, the storm turned eastward, and continued this motion for another few days. On July 26, Cempaka dissipated over the southern coast of Hainan.

== Preparations and impact ==
=== China ===
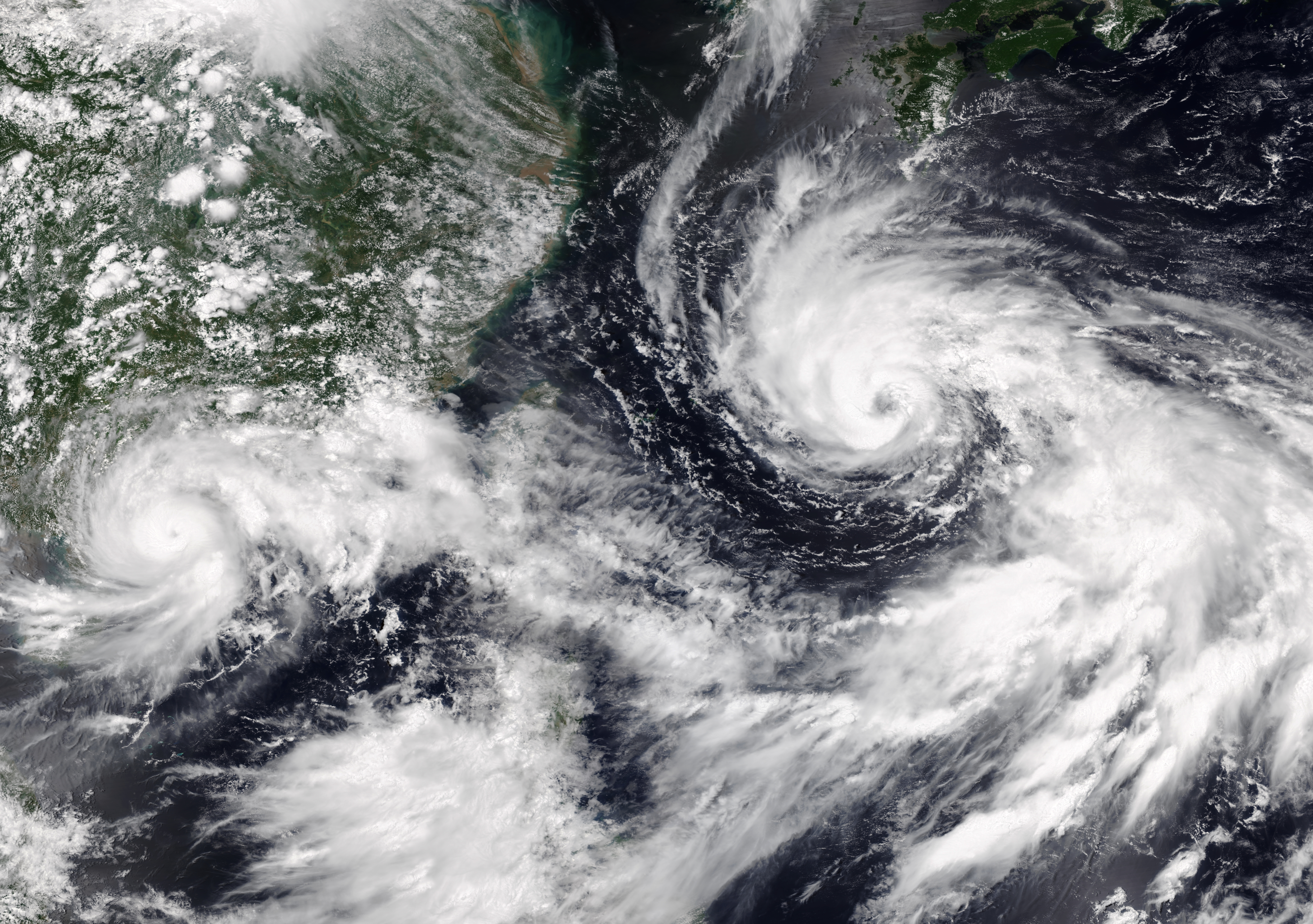
Two simultaneous tropical cyclones on July 20, Typhoons Cempaka (left) and In-fa (right).

In Guangdong, 105,000 people were evacuated as Cempaka approached the province. Local authorities ordered the shutdown of 57 coastal tourist destinations, called back 36,280 fishing vessels and asked 16,243 fish-farming workers to be evacuated ashore, according to the provincial emergency management department. The city of Yangjiang implemented traffic controls on many roads and issued a red alert for rainstorms. It also called back 384 fishing vessels and asked 2,680 fish-farming workers to be evacuated ashore. Nearly 5,000 people in the city were evacuated to safety. In Guangzhou, the Baiyun International Airport canceled 127 flights and delayed 19 outbound flights by 5:15 pm local time at Tuesday. In Yangxi County, the local transportation bureau dispatched 325 staff and law enforcement personnel, inspected 120 vehicles to carry out typhoon rescue, road clearance and traffic diversion, and cleared more than 80 roadblocks. A total of 20 houses were damaged, of which 7 were severely damaged and 13 were partially damaged, along with some road traffic facilities. In total, economic losses totaled $4.25 million in the county.

=== Hong Kong ===
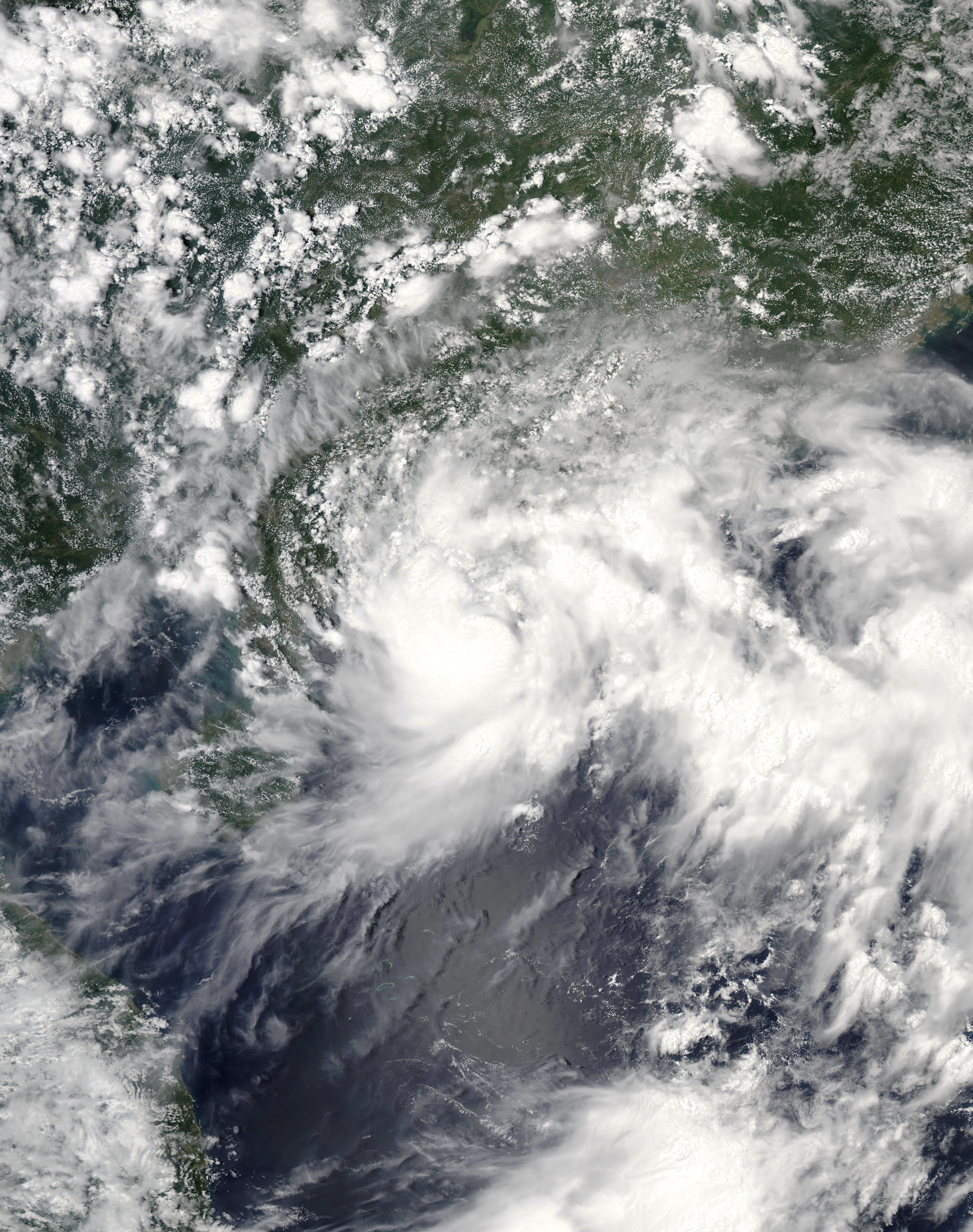
Cempaka as a tropical storm on July 19

The Hong Kong Observatory (HKO) issued a Signal No. 1 alert on July 18, at 9:40 pm local time (01:40 UTC), as Cempaka was located within 800 km away from Hong Kong. The following day, a Signal No. 3 alert was further issued by the observatory, at 4:10 pm local time (08:10 UTC). Amid a Signal No. 3 alert, a 60-year old hiker was found dead following hours of long search and was discovered to have been swept away by flooding after reaching Hero Falls, the police said.

=== Vietnam ===
2 people died, each respectively from Vĩnh Long and Cà Mau, due to a house collapse. Furthermore, 137 houses collapsed and 125 roofs were removed. A landslide was also reported on a river bank in Ngọc Hiển district. In Thanh Hóa, the district experienced heavy rain due to the influence of Cempaka as a weakened tropical depression. Assessing the complicated flood situation, the district government evacuated 305 households and about 1,400 people to a safer place. Flooding caused some damage in Mường Lát. On the afternoon of July 23, floods passed through Quang Chieu commune, sweeping away a temporary bridge that connected Pung village to three hamlets, Suoi Tut and Côn Đảo villages, which made it difficult for nearly 180 households to travel. The government has sent people to guard, not allowing people and vehicles to pass. The city of Lào Cai experienced torrential rains, submerging many roads, streets and caused hundreds of households to be flooded.

=== Elsewhere ===
In the Philippines, the system enhanced the prevailing southwest monsoon, together with In-fa (locally known as Fabian). As a result, heavy rainfall warnings were issued by the PAGASA for Metro Manila and several other provinces nearby. In Macau, the Macao Meteorological and Geophysical Bureau (SMG) hoisted a Signal No. 3 alert at 2:30 pm and remained in effect throughout the rest of the day. The managing director who oversees the Xayaburi Dam in Laos, which reflected the volumes discharge from the Mekong River that ran through the power plant, stated that the flow rate was 8,000 cubic metres per second, an increase from the average of 3,588 cubic meter per second during the period from July 1–24, with the rise being attributed to Cempaka.

== See also ==
- Weather of 2021
- Tropical cyclones in 2021
- Tropical Storm Goni (2009)
- Tropical Storm Nida (2016)
- Tropical Storm Higos (2020)
