= MVC COVID-19 vaccine =

Vaccine against COVID-19

Vaccine description
- Target: SARS-CoV-2
- Vaccine type: Protein subunit

Clinical data
- Other names: MVC-COV1901
- Routes of administration: Intramuscular

Legal status
- Legal status: Full and emergency authorizations; Full list of MVC vaccine authorizations

Identifiers
- CAS Number: 2565776-92-1
- DrugBank: DB15854

The MVC COVID-19 vaccine (Chinese: 高端新冠肺炎疫苗; pinyin: Gāoduān xīnguàn fèiyán yìmiáo; Wade–Giles: Kaotuan hsinkuan feiyen imiao), designated MVC-COV1901 and also known as the Medigen COVID-19 vaccine, is a protein subunit COVID-19 vaccine developed by Medigen Vaccine Biologics Corporation in Taiwan, American company Dynavax Technologies, and the U.S. National Institutes of Health.

== Technology ==
This vaccine is made by the recombinant S-2P spike protein. It is adjuvanted with CpG 1018 supplied by Dynavax, which was used in a previously FDA-approved adult hepatitis B vaccine.

== Clinical trials ==
On 16 February 2020, Medigen Vaccine Biologics Corporation (MVC) signed a collaboration agreement with US National Institutes of Health (NIH) for COVID-19 vaccine development. The partnership will allow MVC to obtain NIH's COVID-19 vaccine and related biological materials to conduct animal studies in Taiwan. On 23 July 2020, Medigen announced collaboration with Dynavax Technologies to develop COVID-19 vaccine.

On 13 October 2020, MVC received Taiwan's government subsidies for the initiation of Phase 1 Clinical Trial in Taiwan starting early October. The Phase 1 Clinical Trial was held at National Taiwan University Hospital with 45 participants ranging the age of 20–50.

On 25 January 2021, MVC initiated a Phase 2 Clinical Trial for its COVID-19 vaccine candidate MVC-COV1901 with the first participant being dosed. The multi-center, randomized, placebo-controlled trial included 3,844 participants aged 20 or older.

On 10 June 2021, MVC released its COVID-19 vaccine Phase 2 interim analysis results, and announced that it will request Emergency Use Authorization (EUA) with the concluding of the Phase 2 Clinical Trial.

Preliminary results from Phase I trials on 77 participants were published in June 2021, indicating what the authors described as "robust" immune system response elicited by the vaccine. The study assessed the humoral immune response by measuring quantities of binding IgG to S protein, and also the cellular immune response by measuring the quantities of IFN-γ and IL-4 secreting T cells.

On 20 July 2021, MVC filed a Phase 3 Clinical Trial IND application with Paraguay's regulatory authority, which was later approved. The Phase 3 Clinical Trial, however, was different from regular Phase 3 Clinical Trial, which uses immune-bridging trial to compare the performance of MVC COVID-19 vaccine with the Oxford-AstraZeneca COVID-19 vaccine. The decision was controversial as immuno-bridging trials were not as widely accepted as disease endpoint trials. However, International Coalition of Medicines Regulatory Authorities (ICMRA) have already discussed whether to accept immuno-bridging as the endpoint and many countries later adopted. The trail was successfully completed and received EUA from Paraguay on February 14, 2022.

On 26 October 2021, the World Health Organization (WHO) selected Medigen vaccine as one of its Solidarity Trial Vaccines. The trial is designed to rapidly evaluate the efficacy and safety of promising new candidate vaccines selected by an independent vaccine prioritization advisory group.

=== Adolescents trial ===
In July 2021, Medigen commenced phase II trials for adolescents aged 12–18.

== Authorization ==
On 19 July 2021, MVC COVID-19 vaccine obtained Emergency Use Authorization (EUA) approval from the Taiwanese government after fulfilling EUA requirements set by Taiwanese authority. The EUA, however, was met with controversy due to the lack of efficacy data and Phase 3 Clinical Trial. The EUA was granted instead based on the immunobridging study in comparison with antibody found on people who received AstraZeneca vaccine. On August 23, 2021, President Tsai Ing-Wen was among the first Taiwanese to receive a dose of the vaccine.

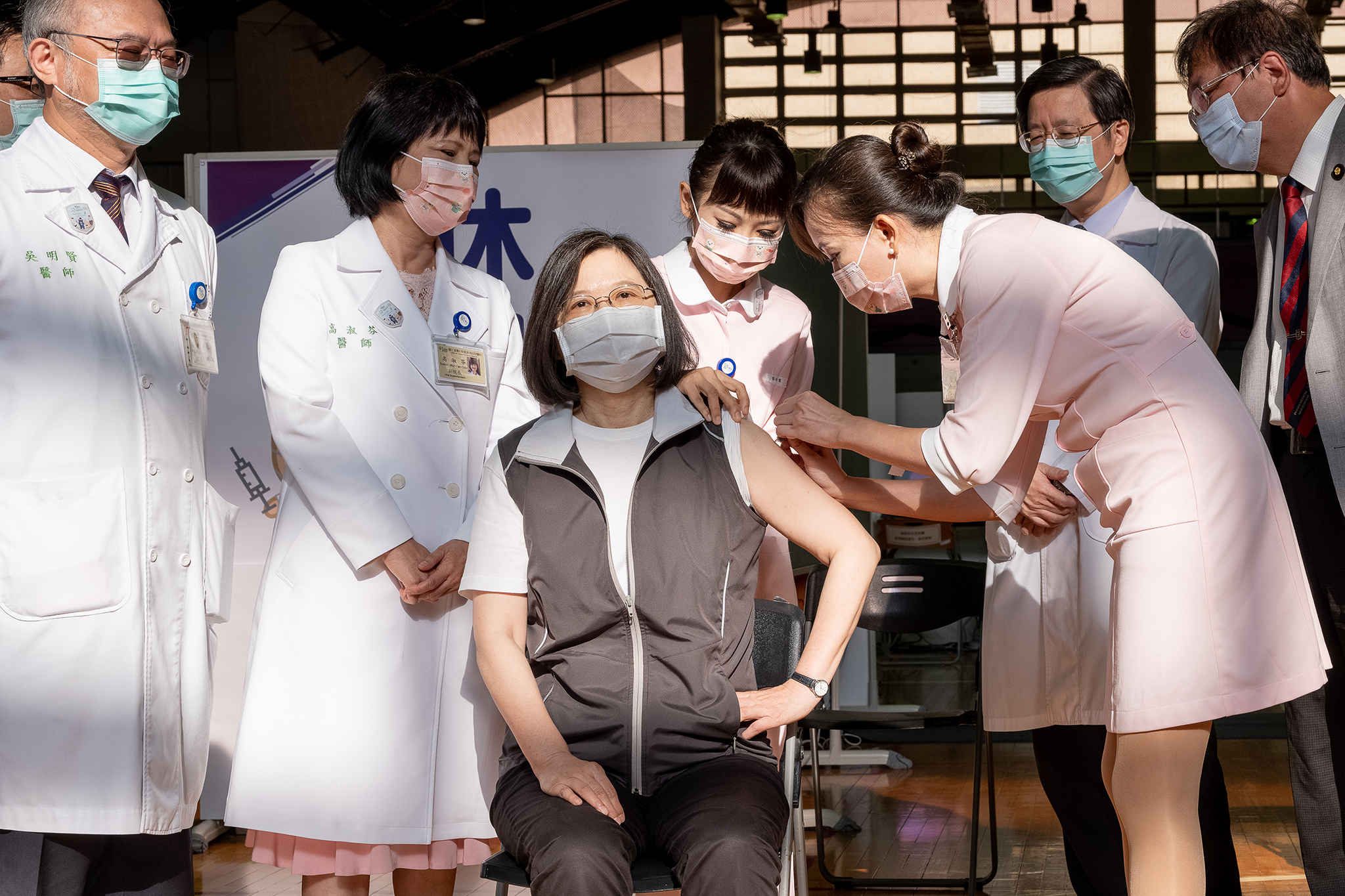
Tsai Ing-Wen receiving a dose of the vaccine

== Controversies ==
In May 2021, when Taiwan experienced an outbreak of domestic cases, the government announced that the vaccine would be available in July despite the result of the phase 2 trial was yet to be announced. In June 2021, the vaccine had just completed the second phase clinical trial, but the vaccine was sent to Taiwan FDA for the application of EUA. Seroconversion rate was used as the surrogate endpoint, though there was lack of evidence at that time. Compared to EUA of vaccine issued in the US, both Moderna and BNT/Pfizer vaccine finished interim analysis from Phase 3 study, which Medigen vaccine skipped.

The controversy arose because immunobridging was not widely accepted as sufficient for EUA at the time. However, due to difficulty to conduct traditional, placebo-controlled efficacy trials in some countries, as few candidates are available or willing to participate, there were discussions to focus on immunobridging studies as an acceptable approach for authorizing COVID-19 vaccines by the International Coalition of Medicines Regulatory Authorities (ICMRA). As the result of the workshop convened on 24 June 2021, immunobridging has now been accepted by the UK, Australia, Canada, Singapore, and Switzerland among other countries. US FDA also authorized Pfizer-BioNTech vaccine for children 5 to 11 years old based on immunobridging alone.
