= UB-612 =

Vaccine candidate against COVID-19

Vaccine description
- Target: SARS-CoV-2
- Vaccine type: Peptide subunit

Clinical data
- Routes of administration: Intramuscular

Identifiers
- CAS Number: 2543531-06-0
- DrugBank: DB16444

UB-612 is a COVID-19 vaccine candidate developed by United Biomedical Asia, and Vaxxinity, Inc. It is a peptide vaccine.

It is composed of SARS-CoV-2 S1-RBD protein and synthetic peptides representing T cell (Th and CTL) epitopes on the nucleocapsid, spike and membrane proteins. The multitope composition is differentiated from other solely spike-protein based vaccines. By recognition against epitopes on Spike (S1-RBD and S2) and non-Spike (N and M) structure proteins, UB-612 provides B-cell and T-cell memory immunity and offers a potential as a universal vaccine to fend off the Omicron variant and new emerging variants of concern. Vaxxinity began seeking regulatory approval for UB-612 for use as a booster vaccine in the United Kingdom and Australia in 2022.

== Technology ==
UB-612 is a peptide vaccine incorporating multiple epitopes, including the spike protein receptor binding domain as well as other virus structural proteins. The spike protein peptide is fused to an Fc domain of single-chain IgG1, and the other six peptides are derived from highly conserved sequences from the spike, nucleocapsid, and membrane proteins of SARS-CoV-1 and SARS-CoV-2. It also contains a proprietary UBITh1 peptide derived from the measles virus fusion protein, CpG oligonucleotides, and aluminum phosphate adjuvant to improve the immune response. It is produced in CHO cells.

== Clinical trials ==
In September 2020, phase I clinical trials of UB-612 started in Taiwan. and in January 2021, phase II clinical trials began in Taiwan. In February 2021, phase II/III clinical trials began. Results from clinical trials showing positive safety and efficacy data were published in May 2022, and in May-June 2023.

In March 2022, Vaxxinity started an international phase III clinical trial of UB-612 as a heterologous booster vaccine against three approved platforms: mRNA, adenovirus vector, and inactivated virus. The company announced positive topline data of the trial in December 2022 and positive results were published in January 2024. A Phase III international trial conducted from March to September 2023, found that UB‑612, given as a heterologous third‑dose booster after primary vaccines, met non‑inferiority versus homologous boosters, outperformed ChAdOx1 and Sinopharm BIBP COVID-19 vaccines on neutralizing antibody responses (including Omicron subvariants), showed durability comparable to Pfizer–BioNTech COVID-19 vaccine through 12 months, and had a similar safety profile.

== Controversy ==
In June 2021, a report revealed that the UB-612 vaccine was developed in part by the US-based Covaxx, a for-profit venture initiated by Blackwater founder Erik Prince. In a series of text messages to Paul Behrends, the close associate recruited for the Covaxx project, Prince described the profit-making possibilities of selling the COVID-19 vaccines. At the time, Covaxx had not yet provided any data from the clinical trials on safety or efficacy it conducted in Taiwan. The responsibility of creating distribution networks was assigned to an Abu Dhabi-based entity, which was mentioned as "Windward Capital" on the Covaxx letterhead but was actually Windward Holdings. The firm's sole shareholder, who handled "professional, scientific and technical activities", was Erik Prince. In March 2021, Covaxx raised $1.35 billion in a private placement.
