= Maximum-value composite procedure =

A maximum-value composite procedure (or MVC) is a procedure used in satellite imaging, which is applied to vegetation studies. It requires that a series of multi-temporal geo-referenced satellite data be processed into NDVI images. On a pixel-by-pixel basis, each NDVI value is examined, and only the highest value is retained for each pixel location. After all pixels have been evaluated, the result is known as an MVC image.

An alternative method is the maximum value interpolated procedure (MVI), which not only retains the NDVI maximum values within a period, but also retains temporal data. This allows the detection of a representative NDVI value for each time period, using simple linear interpolation. A profile simulation shows that MVI has a significant error reduction compared with the MVC method.
