= Medigen Vaccine Biologics Corporation =

Company based in Zhubei, Hsinchu County, Taiwan

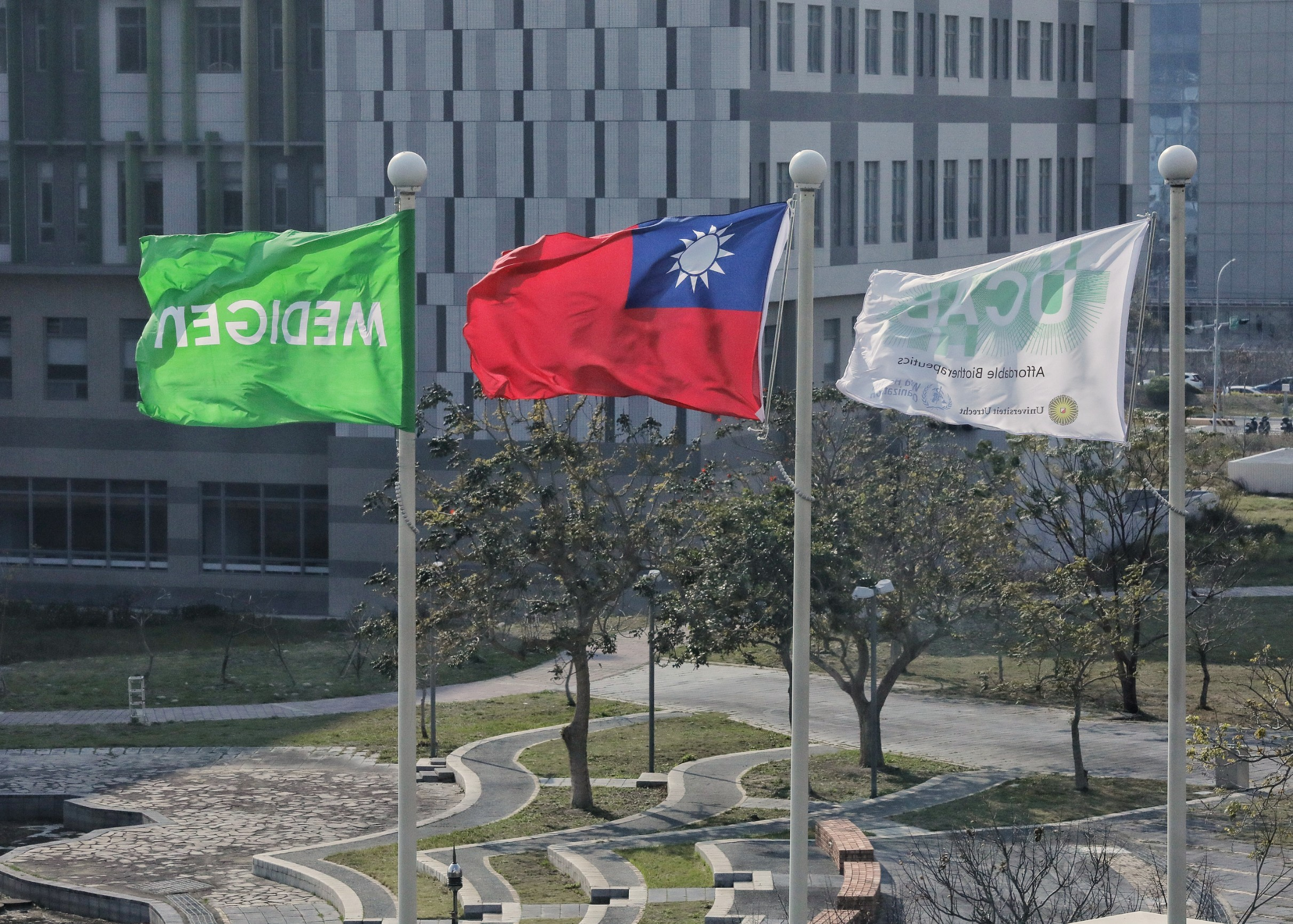
- Native name: 高端疫苗生物製劑
- Founded: October 2012
- Headquarters: Neihu, Taipei, Taiwan
- Parent: Medigen Biotechnology Corporation
- Website: Official website

The Medigen Vaccine Biologics Corporation (MVC; traditional Chinese: 高端疫苗生物製劑; simplified Chinese: 高端疫苗生物制剂; pinyin: Gāoduān Yìmiáo Shēngwù Zhìjì) is a pharmaceutical company headquartered in Neihu, Taipei, Taiwan.

== History ==
The company was founded in October 2012. During the COVID-19 pandemic in Taiwan, the company produces the MVC COVID-19 vaccine to fight the virus.

On 18 March 2026, Vietnam's Ministry of Health has approved the rollout of the Medigen enterovirus vaccine in Vietnam, which is the company's first overseas rollout.

== Manufacturing plant ==
The company has a manufacturing plant in Hsinchu Biomedical Science Park, Zhubei City, Hsinchu County.

== See also ==
- COVID-19 vaccination in Taiwan
