= Okidaitōjima =

Island within Ryukyu Islands

Native name: 沖大東島 Okidaitō-jima
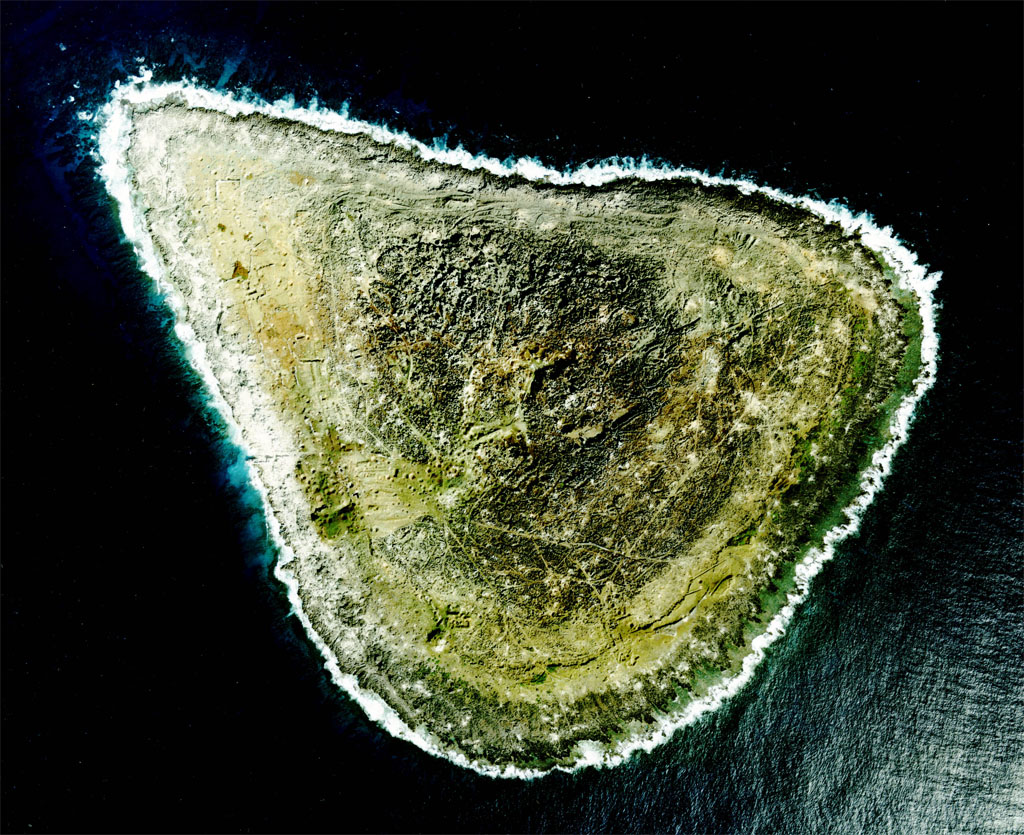
- Aerial Photograph of Okidaitōjima

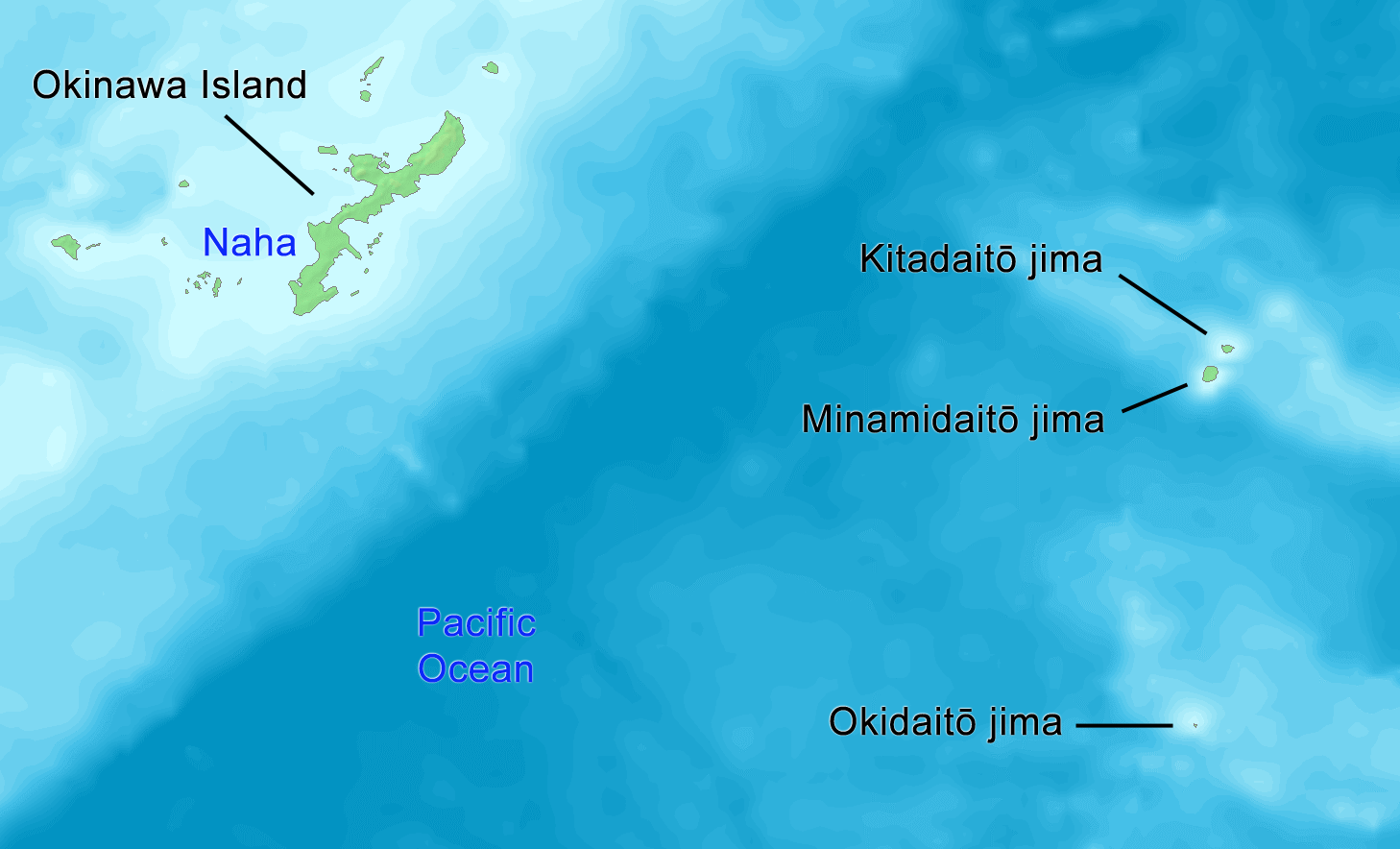

Geography
- Location: Philippine Sea
- Coordinates: 24°28′N 131°11′E
- Archipelago: Daitō Islands
- Area: 1.19 km^{2} (0.46 sq mi)
- Length: 1.5 km (0.93 mi)
- Width: 1 km (0.6 mi)
- Coastline: 4.5 km (2.8 mi)
- Highest elevation: 31.1 m (102 ft)

Administration
- Japan
- Prefectures: Okinawa Prefecture
- District: Shimajiri District
- Village: Kitadaitō

Demographics
- Population: 0 (uninhabited)

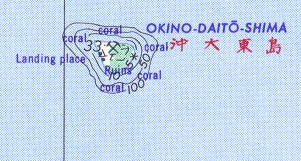
Map of Okidaitō

Okidaitōjima (沖大東島), also spelled as Oki Daitō Island or Oki-Daitō or Oki-no-Daitō, previously known as Rasa Island (ラサ島, Rasa-tō), is an abandoned island in the Daitō Islands group southeast of Okinawa, Japan. It is administered as part of the village of Kitadaitō, Shimajiri District, Okinawa.

== Geography ==
Okidaitōjima is a relatively isolated coralline island, located approximately 110 kilometres (59 nmi) south of Minamidaitōjima, the largest island of the archipelago, and 160 kilometres (86 nmi) south of Kitadaitōjima. Naha, Okinawa, is 408 kilometres (220 nmi) to the northwest. As with the other islands in the archipelago, Okidaitōjima is an uplifted coral atoll with a steep coastal cliff of limestone (the former fringing coral reef of the island), and a depressed center (the former lagoon of the island). The island is roughly triangular in shape, with a circumference of about 4.5 kilometres (2.8 mi) and an area of 1.15 square kilometres (0.44 sq mi). The highest point is 33 metres (108 ft) above sea level. Due to extensive phosphate mining operations in the early 20th century, and decades of use as a bombing and gunnery range by the United States Navy, the island has very little topsoil and no trees.

Okidaitō has a humid subtropical climate (Köppen climate classification Cfa) with very warm summers and mild winters. Precipitation is significant throughout the year; the wettest month is June and the driest month is February. The island is subject to frequent typhoons.

== History ==
It was first sighted by the Spanish navigator Bernardo de la Torre on 25 September 1543, during his abortive attempt to reach New Spain from the Philippines with the San Juan de Letran. It was then charted as Abreojos (Keep your eyes open!) because being so flat and almost water level it was dangerous for navigation. It was later sighted by a Manila galleon on 28 July 1587, commanded by Pedro de Unamuno who charted the Daitōs as the Islas sin Provecho (Useless Islands). Another Manila galleon, the Nuestra Señora de la Consolación commanded by Felipe Tompson, reported its sighting in 1773 and charted it as Isla Dolores. Its sighting was also reported by the British in 1788 and named "Grampus Island", but the recorded coordinates were not correct. The French also reported sighting an island in 1807. However, in 1815, the last Manila Galleon, the Spanish frigate San Fernando de Magallanes, made a definite sighting at the present coordinates, and named the island "Isla Rasa" (Flat Island in Spanish). The island remained uninhabited until formally claimed by the Empire of Japan in 1900. In 1907, a team of pioneers from Hachijōjima, one of the Izu Islands located 287 kilometres (178 mi) south of Tokyo, led by Tamaoki Han'emon (1838–1910), who had previously pioneered settlement on Minamidaitōjima, became the first human inhabitants of the island. The island was surveyed in 1908 by Tsuneto Noritaka, a professor with the Ministry of Agriculture and Commerce, who recommended that its guano resources be exploited for fertilizer. "The Rasa Island Phosphate Ore Company" (ラサ島燐礦株式會社; today Rasa Industries Ltd.) was created in 1911 for this purpose and also for the export of sugar. During this period (1911–1945), Okidaitōjima was inhabited by up to 2000 people, with a settlement located in the west of the island. Until 1929, the population was exclusively male and consisted of workers from Okinawa and managers from Hachijojima. The disparity in wages led to labor unrest in the 1920s.

Mining operations were halted from 1929 to 1940 for economic reasons, but were resumed in 1940 due to the need for phosphates in explosives. The inhabitants were evacuated to mainland Okinawa in 1945 due to the increasing threat of attack during World War II.

After World War II, the island was occupied by the United States and was used as a bombing range by the United States Navy. The island was returned to Japan in 1972, and remains the private property of Rasa Industries.

== Self-Defense Force exercises ==
In late October 2013 it was announced that Okidaitojima would be the site of large scale exercises by the JSDF, including live fire naval exercises and amphibious landings, intended to test the JSDF's ability to defend remote islands against hostile incursions. These would be among the largest exercises ever held by the JSDF, involving at least 34,000 troops along with vessels and aircraft.

== See also ==
- Desert island
- Lists of islands
