= Gagari =

Gagari may refer to:

- Daitō Islands, for which Gagari is an alternate name
- The inhabitants of Gagra, in Abkhazia, Georgia
