= Daitō Islands =

Archipelago within the Ryukyu Islands

Native name: Daitō Shotō (大東諸島) Nickname: Borodino Islands, Ufuagari
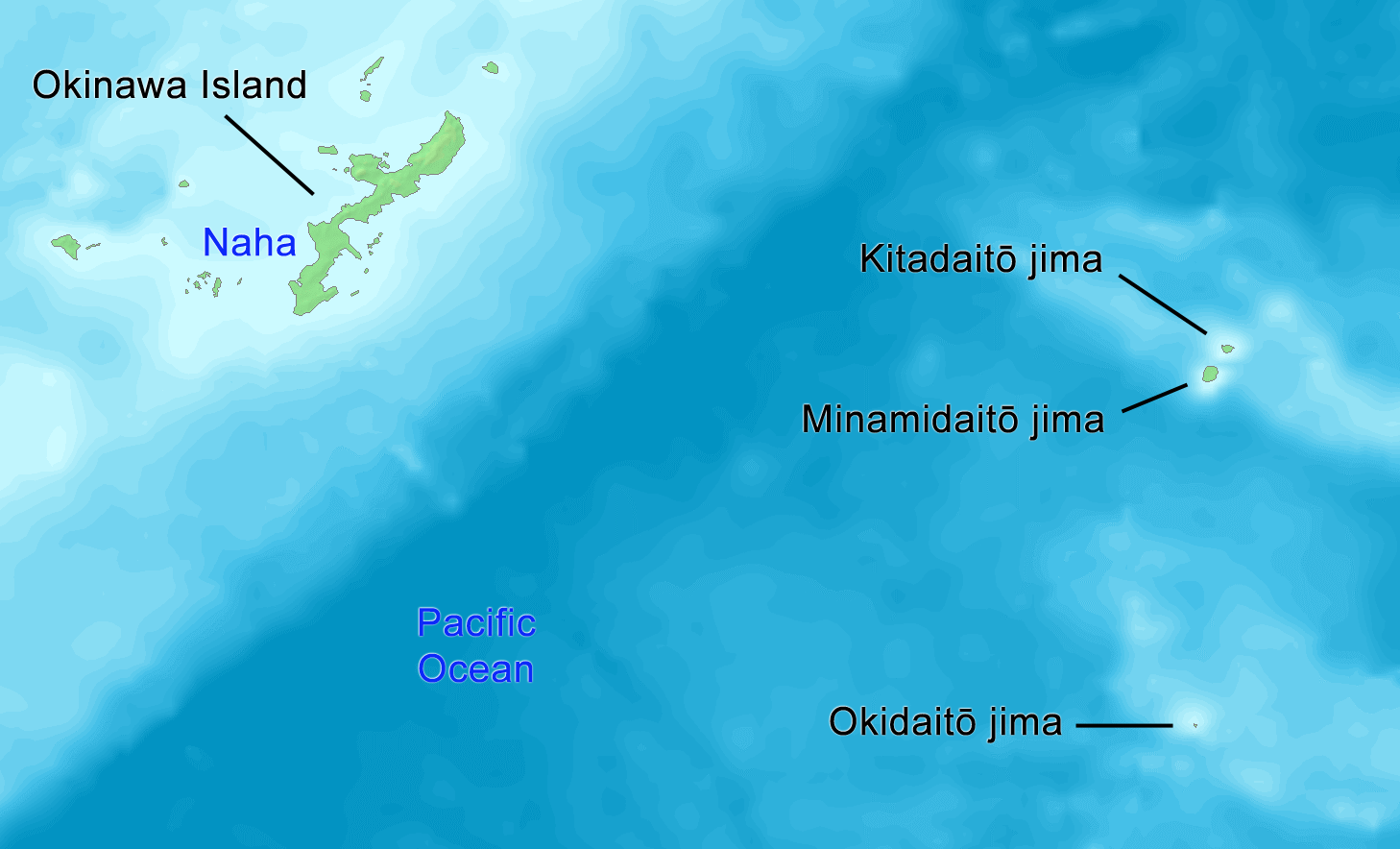
- Map of the Daitō Islands

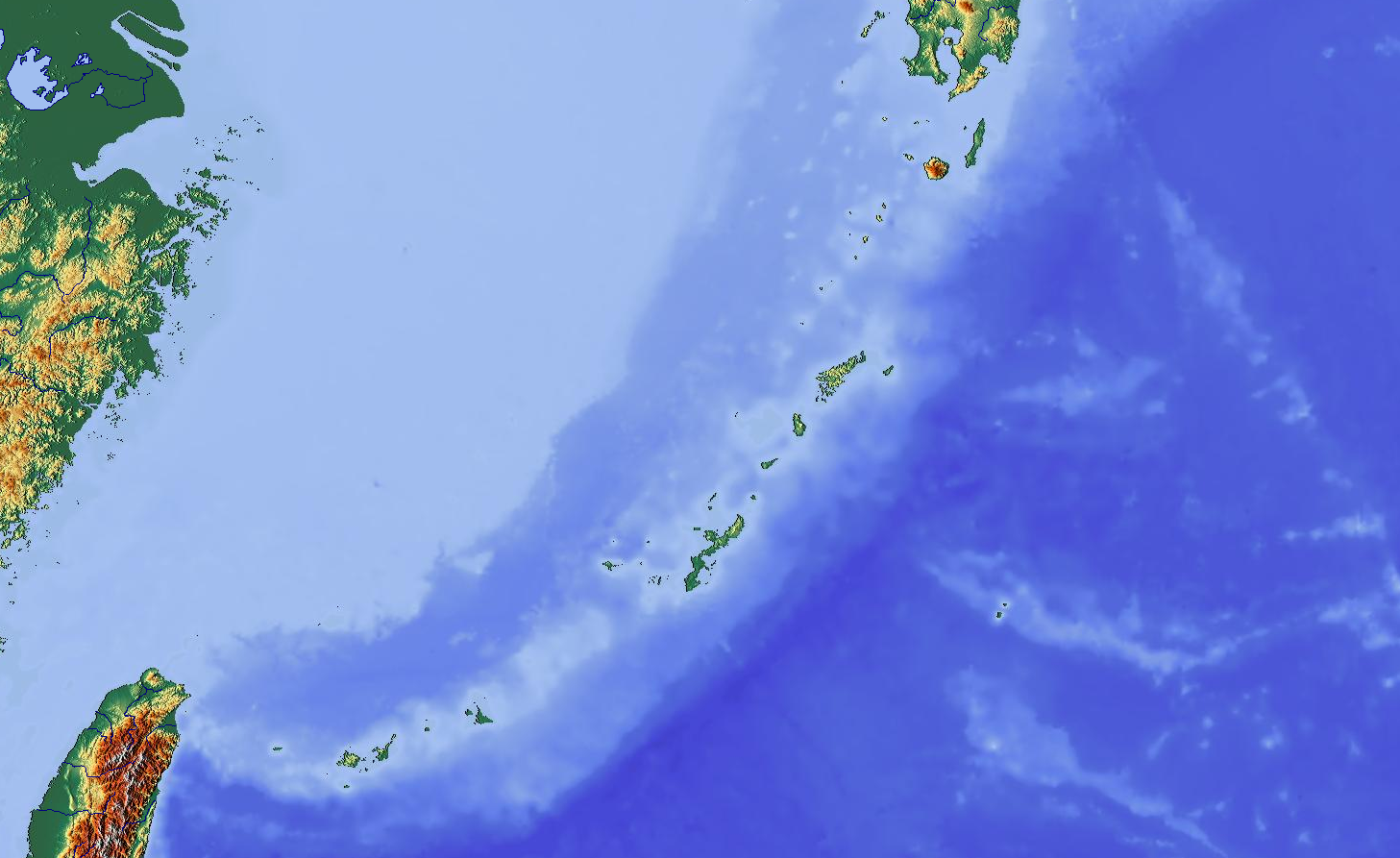
- Location within Ryukyu Islands

Geography
- Coordinates: 25°50′34″N 131°14′26″E
- Adjacent to: Philippine Sea
- Total islands: 3
- Area: 44.427 km^{2} (17.153 sq mi)

Administration
- Japan
- Region: Ryukyu Islands
- Prefecture: Okinawa
- District: Shimajiri

Demographics
- Population: 2,107 (2010)
- Pop. density: 45.83/km^{2} (118.7/sq mi)
- Ethnic groups: Japanese

The Daitō Islands (Japanese: 大東諸島, Hepburn: Daitō-shotō) are an archipelago consisting of three isolated coral islands, administered by Japan, in the Philippine Sea southeast of Okinawa. The islands have a total area of 44.427 square kilometers (17.153 sq mi) and a population of 2,107.

Administratively, the whole group belongs to Shimajiri District of Okinawa Prefecture, and is divided between the villages of Minamidaitō and Kitadaitō, with uninhabited Okidaitōjima island administered as part of Kitadaitō municipality, although physically located closer to Minamidaitōjima.

== Etymology ==
Kita, minami, and oki means, respectively, "north", "south", and "offshore" while daitō means "great east".

== History ==
These islands have long been known in Okinawa as Ufuagari (“the Great East”). Okidaitōjima was first sighted by the Spanish explorer Bernardo de la Torre on 25 September 1543 during a failed attempt to find a northern route back to Mexico from the Philippines. Minamidaitōjima and Kitadaitōjima were recorded a few days later. They were visited later by European explorers of various nations, and were commonly known as the Borodino Islands after a Russian vessel surveyed them in 1820.

The islands remained uninhabited until formally claimed by the Empire of Japan in 1885. In 1900, a team of pioneers from Hachijōjima, one of the Izu Islands located 287 kilometers (178 mi) south of Tokyo led by Tamaoki Han'emon (1838 – 1910), started a settlement on Minamidaitōjima, and began cultivating sugar cane. He subsequently led colonization efforts on Kitadaitōjima and Okidaitōjima. Those two islands had substantial deposits of guano, which was mined for phosphate-based fertilizer and gunpowder. By 1919, the population was more than 4,000 people.

Kitadaitōjima is built of limestone from an ancient coral reef. In 1934, a team of Japanese scientists visited it in order to bore cores through the limestone, in an attempt to discover the nature of the rock upon which the limestone sits. In 1936, the bore hole reached a final depth of 431.67 meters. However, the scientists discovered nothing beyond fossil corals and ancient foraminiferous sands.

During World War II, Minamidaitōjima was repeatedly attacked by the United States Navy. After World War II all of the islands were occupied by the United States and administered as part of the United States Civil Administration of the Ryukyu Islands from 1950. The islands were returned to Japan in 1972 under the 1971 Okinawa reversion agreement.

== Islands ==
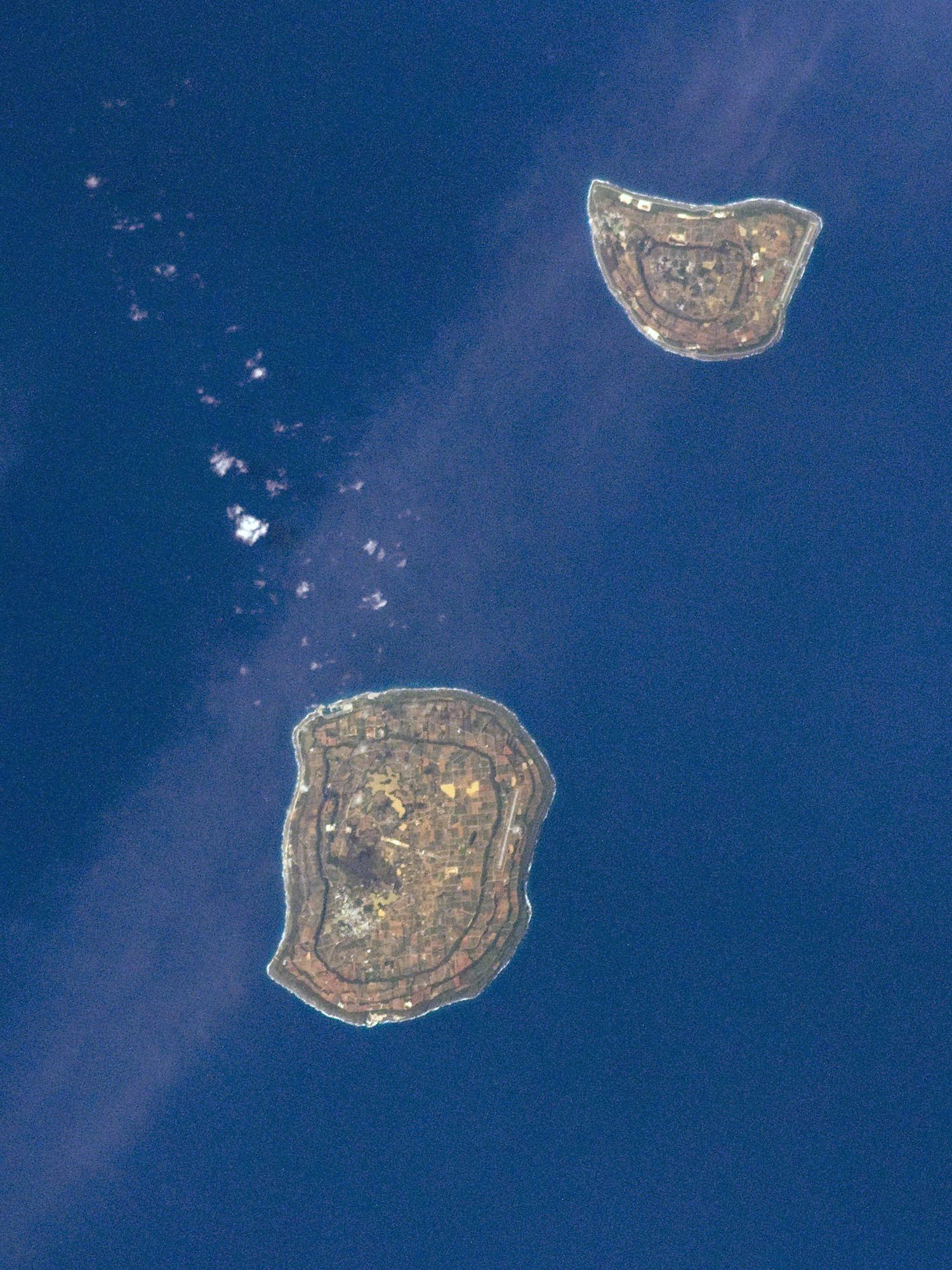
Daitō Islands photo

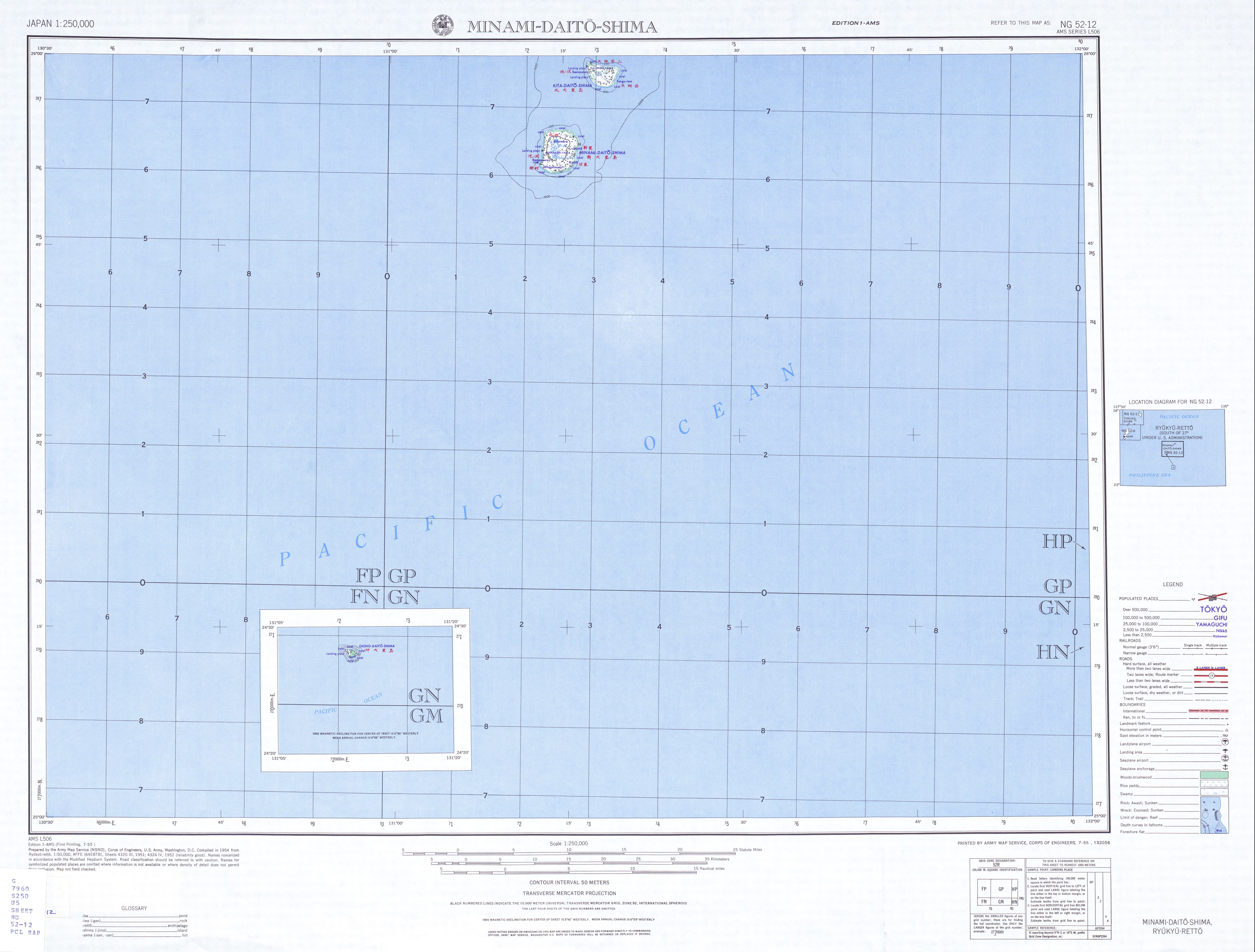
Map of the Daitō Islands (AMS, 1954)

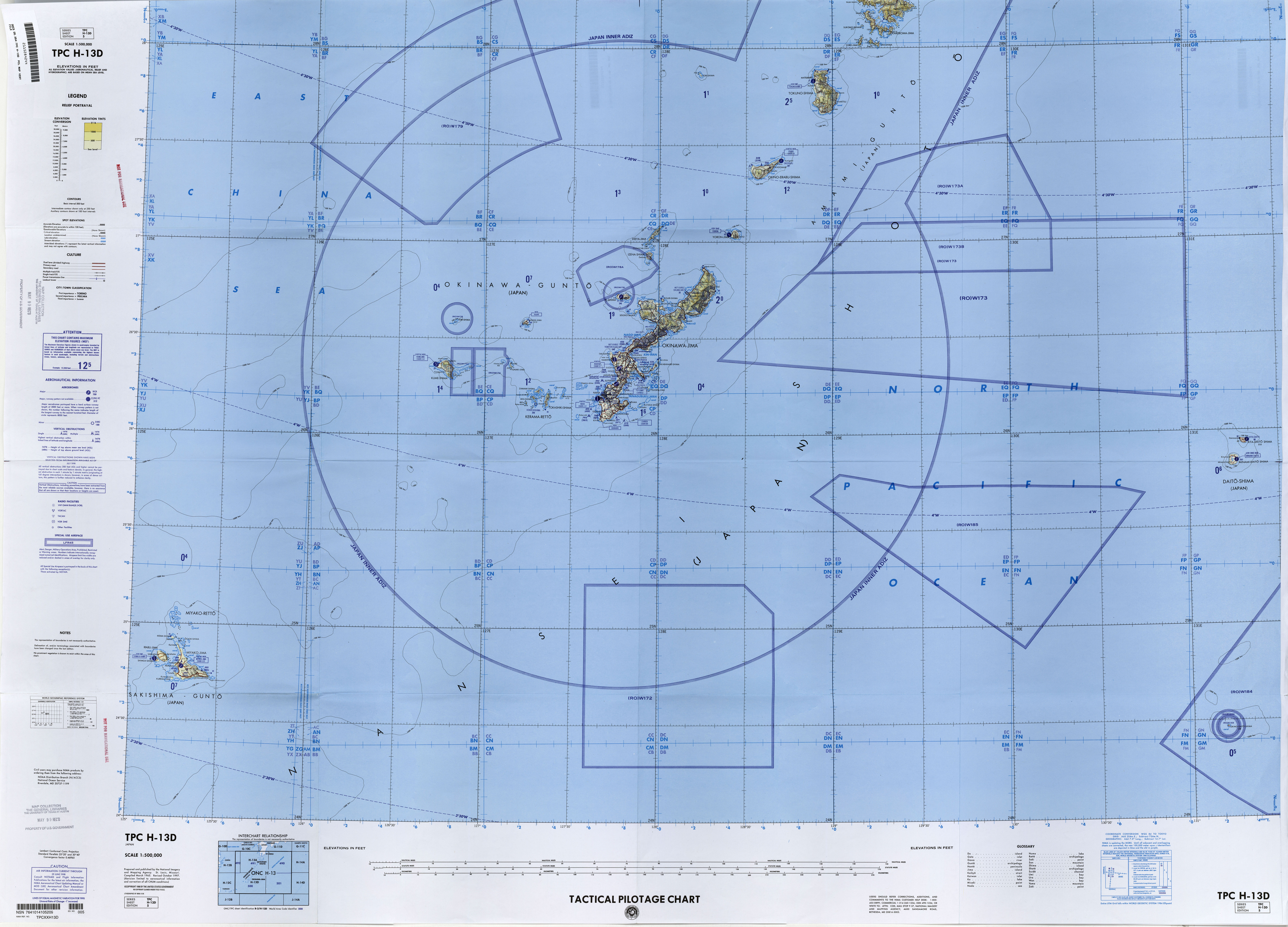
Map showing the Daitō Islands in the region (NIMA, 1997)

Photo	Name	Kanji	Area [km^{2}]	Population 2004	highest point [m]	Peak	Coordinates
	Minamidaitōjima fee ufuagarijima	南大東島	30.57	1,442	78		25°50′45″N 131°14′30″E
	Kitadaitōjima nishi ufuagarijima	北大東島	11.94	665	75		25°57′N 131°18′E
	Okidaitōjima uchi ufuagarijima	沖大東島	1.15	–			24°28′N 131°11′E

== Ecology ==
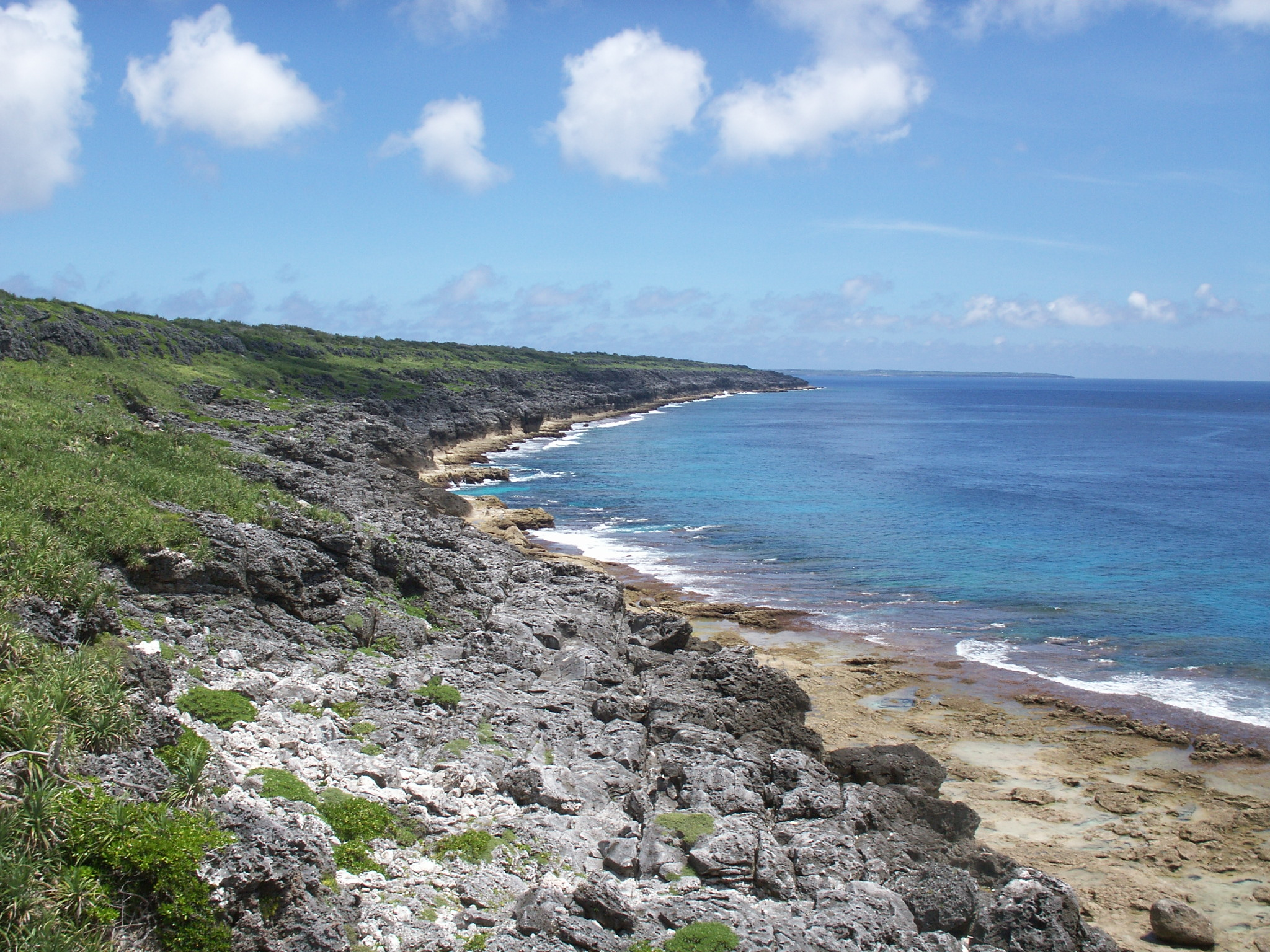
Phytocoenosis on east coast of Minamidaitō Island.

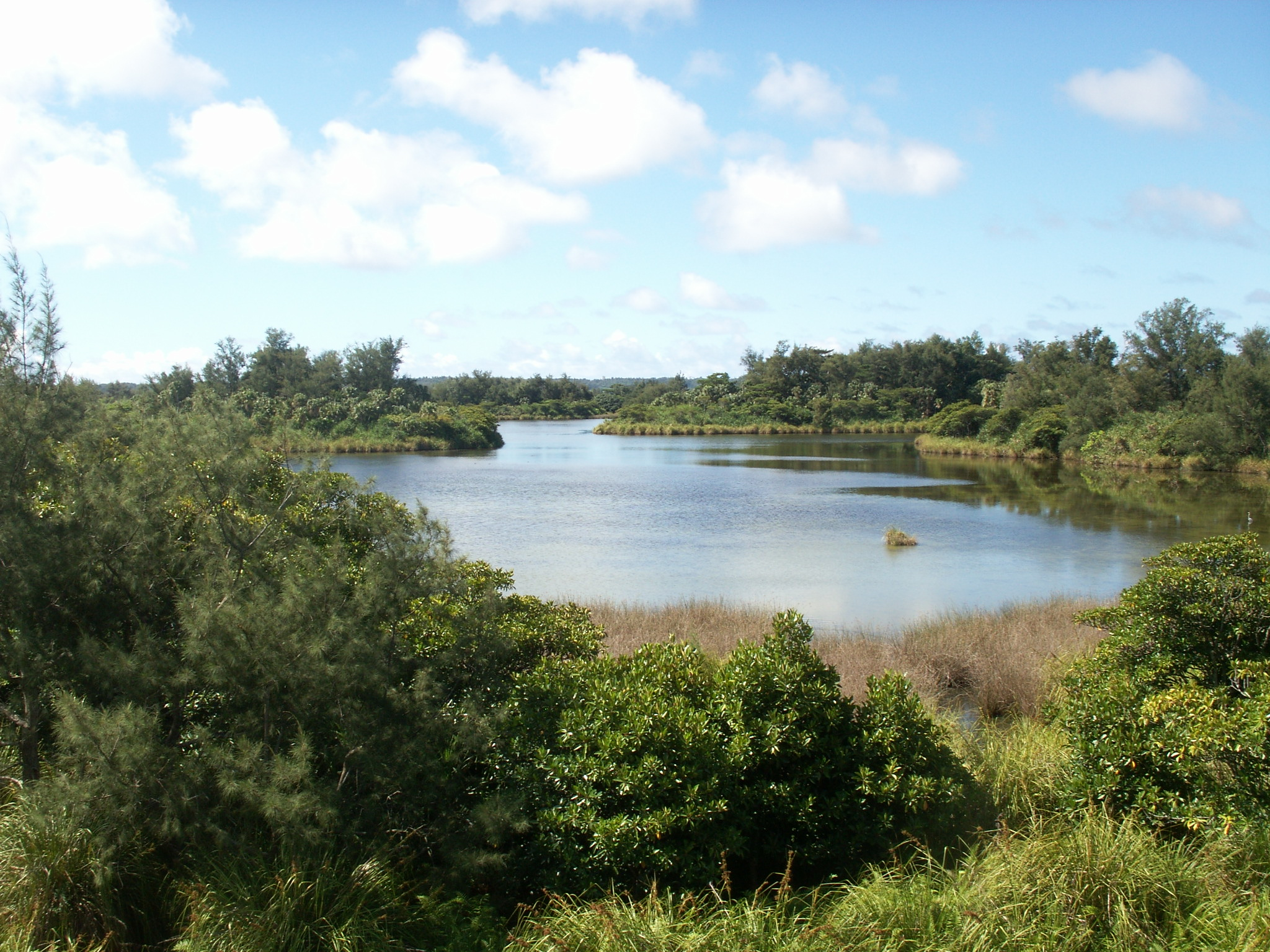
Ōike pond in Minamidaitō Village.

Being separated by more than 300 km from Ryukyu Islands, the nearest landmass, a unique and isolated ecosystem holding endemic species was established on Daitō Islands which doesn't include habu vipers naturally unlike many of Ryukyu Islands. Lack of snakes caused introduced and invasive toads to flourish and run rampant. Three main islands of Kita, Minami, and Oki were originally covered by virgin forests, however human activities including military exercise severely damaged and resulted in disappearing of forests and extinction of endemic species most notably on Okidaitōjima. Aside from eels, any fresh water fish and amphibians had not been recorded in pre-exploration periods. Entire archipelago excluding Okidaitōjima and smaller islands is listed as a Wildlife Protection Areas in Japan extending for 4,251 hectare with a special protection zone of 234 hectare.

Many of flora and fauna were named after the islands including Daito fruit bat, Daito buzzard, Daito Neolitsea, Daito scops owl (listed in the natural monument of Japan), Daito Stag Beetle, Daito Figulus binodulus (stag beetle), Daito Euterpnosia (cicada), Daito Little grebe, Daito Bulbul, Daito Mejiro, Daito Livistona, Daito Excoecaria, and Daito Crepidiastrum. Several of these such as Daito bush warbler, Daito varied tit, and Daito wren became extinct. The island group has been recognised as an Important Bird Area (IBA) by BirdLife International.

Migratory and oceanic species that breed on the islands include such as Laysan albatross, Black-winged stilt, tuna, skipjack tuna, Japanese Spanish mackerel, marlin, manta rays, Japanese spiny lobster, sea turtles, dolphins and Humpback whales. Among Ryukyu Islands, green pheasant is only present on Daitō Islands followed by corals and coral fish that are rare in the rest of the archipelago most notably Chaetodon auripes which is occasionally regarded as endemic to the islands and Hemitaurichthys thompsoni was only previously recorded in Bonin Islands. Black Jacks and knifejaws that have become rarer in Japanese waters still occur as well.

== European sightings of the Daitō Islands ==
- First sighted by Spanish navigator Bernardo de la Torre in late September 1543. Okidaitōjima was charted as Abreojos ("Eyes Open!") and Minamidaitōjima and Kitadaitōjima as Las Dos Hermanas ("The Two Sisters").
- There is little doubt that the two small Islas sin Provecho (Worthless Islands), sighted by the Spanish navigator Pedro de Unamuno on 28 July 1587, are the Daitō Islands.
- The island of “Amsterdam”, which can be found to the west of “Malabrigo” on the maps of Quast, Martini, Sanson, and Nolin, according to Dahlgren, appears for the first time on a map of 1635. It was still searched for unsuccessfully by Beechey in 1827 and is clearly a longitudinal misplacement of Rasa Island, i.e., Okidaitōjima.
- The Breskens-Eylant discovered on the Dutch expedition of Maarten Gerritszoon Vries (in the Castricum) and Hendrik Corneliszoon Schaep (in the Breskens) on 8 May 1643 at 24°43 'N and 151°31' 30" E of Teneriffa ( 135°01 '30" E of Gr.), a low lying little island about c. 1.5 mylen (scarcely 2.8 km) long, is likewise identical with Isla Rasa, now Okidaitōjima (24°28' N; 131°11 'E). On Quast's chart, which was also used on the Vries expedition, the island of "Malabrigo" is situated 21 mylen to the west of "Breskens-Eylant". In the Daghregister of the Batavia port authority for 14 December 1643, on Vries’ voyage back, this discovery is called "Malabriga".
- On an 1817 London chart, at c. 24°45 N; 134°10 E, is the entry "I. Dolores 1773" which doubtless goes back to a sighting from a Spanish Manila galleon on her way from the Philippines to New Spain. We know that in 1773 the Spanish vessel Nuestra Señora de Consolación with Felipe Tompson as pilot sailed from Manila to California via New Guinea. On that voyage Helen Reef, Ngatik, and Oroluk in the Caroline Islands were sighted. Tompson's southern route may not go against a sighting of the Daitos in the same year, but indicates that he initially tried to pursue the same course as his compatriot Francisco Antonio Maurelle seven years later, in 1780/81, a course which eventually was abandoned in favor of the traditional route.
- On a trading voyage aboard the Felice from Whampoa (Canton) to the northwest coast of America, the British captain John Meares on 4 and 5 April 1788 sighted three islands, which were believed to be a new discovery and called the "Grampus Isles". Notwithstanding the considerable longitudinal difference of 14°30 and 14°55 30, respectively, these Grampus Islands were Rasa (Okidaitōjima) and the Borodinos (Minamidaitōjima and Kitadaitōjima).
- Kendrick Island (24°35 N; 134°00 E) is a further longitudinal misplacement of Rasa Island. The earliest chart on which to find it dates from 1805. The name probably refers to either John Kendrick senior, who from the second half of 1789 until his death in December 1794 was busy in the maritime regions in question (further trading voyages of his vessel Lady Washington continued until 1794) or John Kendrick junior, who in July 1789 entered the Spanish service in Nootka Sound and as "Don Juan Kendrick", "was sent to Spain in 1796 … [as] a skillful pilot in the galleon service". As John Kendrick, Jr. was on the Northwest Coast for the fur trade (as a supercargo on the Eliza) in 1799, his active time in Spanish service, during which he could have encountered Kendrick Island, is between 1789 and 1796. A contingent sighting must have taken place between the second half of 1789 and 1796, either on a trading voyage to or from East Asia or on the Manila galleon route from the Philippines to New Spain (Mexico).
- According to Krusenstern, who refers to an Arrowsmith chart, the Bishop Rocks, lying at 25°20 N; 131°15 E, were discovered in 1796 or 1799 (the data are inconsistent) by Captain Bishop in the Nautilus. However, 1797 was the only year the Nautilus was east of the Ryukyu Islands, on her way from Macao to Kamchatka (16 June — 25 August 1797). It must have been during that voyage — any time between 6 and 31 July — that these rocks, presumably from afar, were sighted, which can be identified from their position with Minamidaitōjima, if not both Minamidaitōjima and Kitadaitōjima as a whole were perceived as "rocks".
- Another sighting of Rasa Island occurred on 8 May 1807, by César-Joseph Bourayne, commander of the French frigate Canonnière, on the way from Cavite to Acapulco. The supposed discovery, whose position was fixed at 24°30 N; 130°18 30 E, was christened "Ile de la Canonnière".
- The Western names that stuck to the Daitō Islands for more than 150 years were given in 1815 and in 1820: in 1815 Okidaitōjima was re-sighted by the last Manila galleon, the Spanish frigate San Fernando de Magallanes, and was called "Isla Rasa", i.e. flat island; the position was fixed at 24°26 '40" N; 131°03' 46" E of Gr; and on 20 June 1820 (st. v.; 2 July 1820 st. n.) Minamidaitōjima and Kitadaitōjima were re-sighted by the Russian Navy's Lieutenant Sachar Ivanovič Ponafidin, who called them Ostrova Borodino (Borodino Islands) after his ship of the Russian-American Company. The positions fixed by him were 25°50'N; 131°12 E for the southern and 26°02 N; 131°15 E for the northern island respectively.
- "The brig Nile, of Boston, Captain Robert Bennet Forbes, in her passage from Canton to the Sandwich Islands, in August, 1825, passed two islands, the southernmost in lat. 25°42 N.; long. 131°13 E.; and the northern one in lat. 25°53 N.; long. 131°17 E. by good observations, and two chronometers", clearly a re-sighting of the Borodinos.
