= Kitadaitō, Okinawa =

Kitadaitō 北大東村
- Village
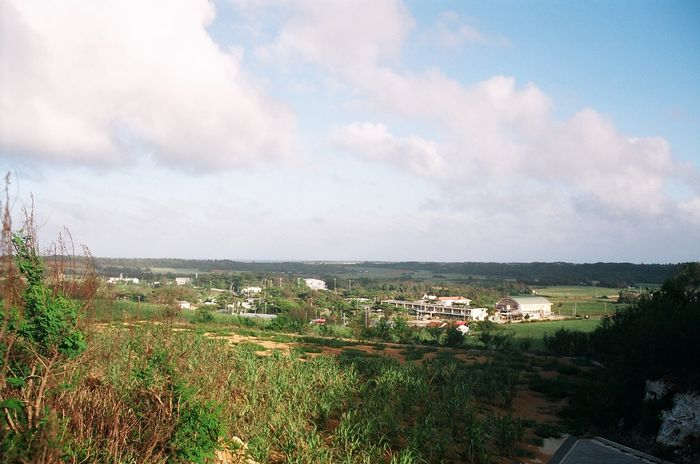
- Kitadaitō landscape

- Flag Emblem

- Location of Kitadaitō in Okinawa Prefecture

- Location in Japan
- Coordinates: 25°56′45″N 131°17′56″E
- Country: Japan
- Region: Kyushu (Ryukyu)
- Prefecture: Okinawa Prefecture
- District: Shimajiri

Government
  - Mayor: Mitsumasa Miyagi

Area
  - Total: 13.10 km^{2} (5.06 sq mi)

Population (October 1, 2016)
  - Total: 615
  - Density: 47/km^{2} (120/sq mi)
- Time zone: UTC+09:00 (JST)
- City hall address: 218 Aza Nakano, Kitadaitō-son, Shimajiri-gun, Okinawa-ken; 901-3992
- Climate: Af
- Website: vill.kitadaito.okinawa.jp
- Symbols
- Flower: Crinum asiaticum
- Tree: Livistona

Kitadaitō (北大東村, Kitadaitō-son) is a village consisting of the islands of Kitadaitōjima and Okidaitōjima of Shimajiri District, Okinawa Prefecture, Japan.

As of October 2016, the village has an estimated population of 615 and a density of 47 persons per km^{2}. The total area is 13.10 km^{2}. All of the inhabitants live on Kitadaitōjima.

== Geography ==
Kitadaitō Island is located about 360 km east of Okinawa Island. It is the easternmost island in Okinawa Prefecture. The island shows characteristic landscape of a raised coral reef island, with a very flat area in its centre.

Okidaitō Island is entirely the private property of the Rasae Group, that used to exploit phosphate ore there. It was then rented by the U.S. Forces in Japan as a shooting range, that started to be used conjointly by the Japan Self Defence Forces in 2015. It is off limits to civilians and currently uninhabited.

=== Area ===
- Kitadaitō Island: 11.94 km^{2}
- Okidaitō Island: 1.15 km^{2}

=== Administrative divisions ===
The village includes four wards.

- Minami (南)
- Minato (港)
- Nakano (中野)
- Rasa (ラサ)

=== Group of Water Collecting Ponds ===
Kitadaitō Village does not present, as Minamidaitō Village, many natural bogs. There is, in the centre of the island, a large fresh water pond, the level of which changes with the tides due to the freshwater lens effect. This pond used to be a very valuable water resource before the desalination process enabled the creation of a tap water network in the village. It is currently only used for agricultural purposes. There are also many artificial water ponds, such as the "East Water Tank" that is the easternmost water tank of Okinawa Prefecture, the "Red Pond" located in front of the sugar factory or the many smaller agricultural ponds. This water is an important resource for the irrigation of the 274 ha (50% of the island area) of sugar cane fields. The sixteen water ponds of Kitadaitō have been registered on the "One Hundred Noticeable Water Pond List" of the Ministry of Agriculture and Forestry on March the 25th 2010.

Those ponds are important resting places for migrating birds such as ospreys, black kites, grey-faced buzzards or herons and a famous birdwatching spot. Every year on the Sugar Cane Day (4th Sunday of April), the residents and the Children Association clean around the ponds.

== Climate ==
Kitadaitō has a tropical rainforest climate (Köppen climate classification Af) with very warm summers and mild winters. Precipitation is significant throughout the year; the wettest month is June and the driest month is February. The island is subject to frequent typhoons.

Climate data for Kitadaitō (2003−2020 normals, extremes 2003−present)
Month	Jan	Feb	Mar	Apr	May	Jun	Jul	Aug	Sep	Oct	Nov	Dec	Year
Record high °C (°F)	26.4 (79.5)	27.0 (80.6)	27.8 (82.0)	29.6 (85.3)	32.4 (90.3)	33.4 (92.1)	33.8 (92.8)	34.5 (94.1)	34.9 (94.8)	33.0 (91.4)	30.3 (86.5)	28.3 (82.9)	34.9 (94.8)
Mean daily maximum °C (°F)	20.9 (69.6)	21.2 (70.2)	22.3 (72.1)	24.3 (75.7)	26.9 (80.4)	29.7 (85.5)	31.8 (89.2)	31.9 (89.4)	31.2 (88.2)	29.1 (84.4)	26.1 (79.0)	22.5 (72.5)	26.5 (79.7)
Daily mean °C (°F)	18.5 (65.3)	18.8 (65.8)	19.6 (67.3)	21.6 (70.9)	24.4 (75.9)	27.1 (80.8)	29.1 (84.4)	29.2 (84.6)	28.5 (83.3)	26.5 (79.7)	23.7 (74.7)	20.3 (68.5)	23.9 (75.1)
Mean daily minimum °C (°F)	16.2 (61.2)	16.5 (61.7)	17.5 (63.5)	19.5 (67.1)	22.3 (72.1)	25.2 (77.4)	26.9 (80.4)	27.0 (80.6)	26.3 (79.3)	24.5 (76.1)	21.8 (71.2)	18.2 (64.8)	21.8 (71.3)
Record low °C (°F)	8.6 (47.5)	8.2 (46.8)	9.9 (49.8)	12.0 (53.6)	15.9 (60.6)	20.0 (68.0)	22.5 (72.5)	23.4 (74.1)	20.8 (69.4)	18.2 (64.8)	14.8 (58.6)	10.8 (51.4)	8.2 (46.8)
Average precipitation mm (inches)	67.1 (2.64)	65.7 (2.59)	70.5 (2.78)	112.6 (4.43)	210.5 (8.29)	206.4 (8.13)	79.4 (3.13)	126.1 (4.96)	145.1 (5.71)	175.8 (6.92)	104.7 (4.12)	105.1 (4.14)	1,469 (57.83)
Average precipitation days (≥ 1.0 mm)	8.5	7.2	6.6	7.7	10.8	10.1	6.7	10.2	10.1	10.4	8.2	9.2	105.7
Source: Japan Meteorological Agency

== History ==
Kitadaitōjima remained uninhabited until formally claimed by the Empire of Japan in 1885. In 1900, a team of pioneers from Hachijōjima became the first human inhabitants of the island, and started the cultivation of sugar cane from 1903. Until World War II, Kitadaitōjima was owned in its entirety by Dai Nippon Sugar (now Dai Nippon Meiji Sugar), which also operated mines for the extraction of guano for use in fertilizer. After World War II, the island was occupied by the United States. The village of Kitadaitō was established in 1946. The island was returned to Japan in 1972.

== Economy ==
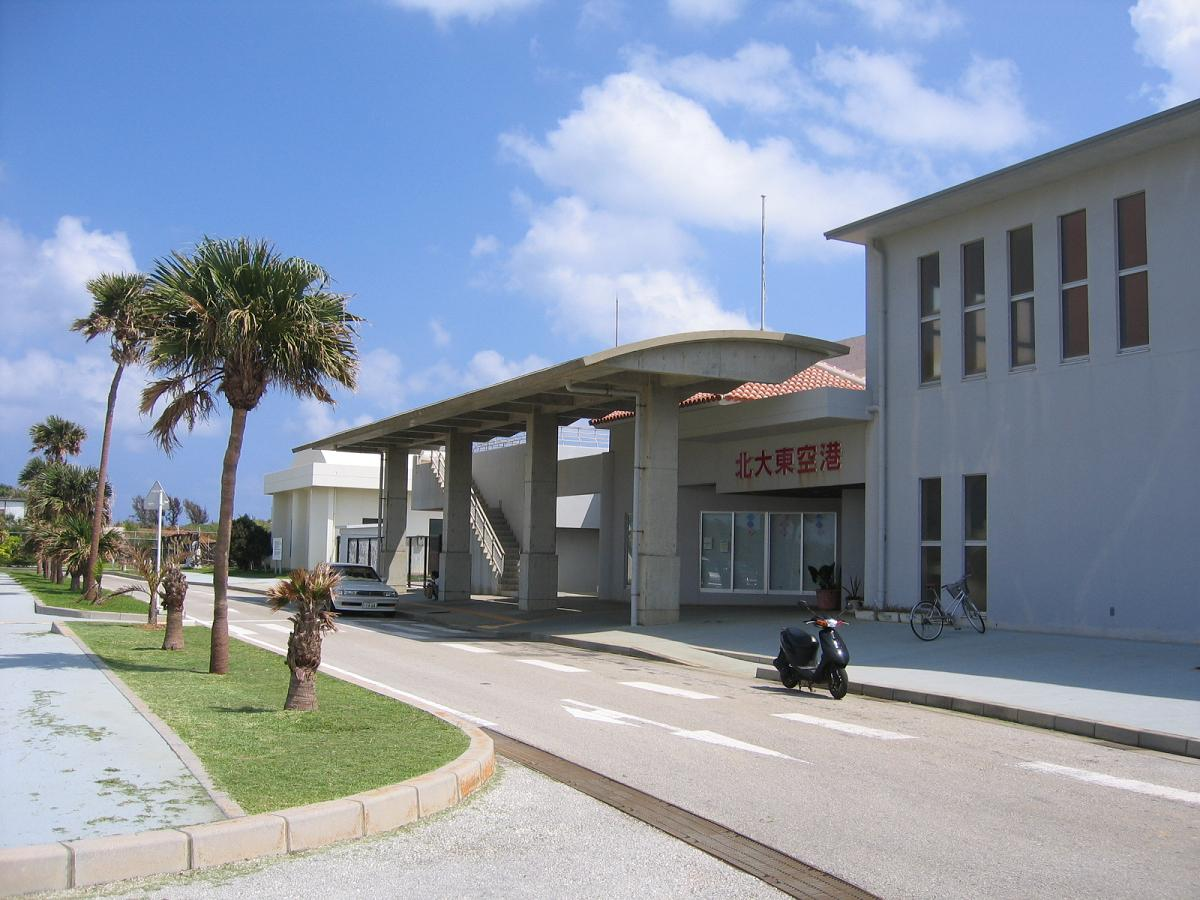
Kitadaitō Airport

Formerly heavily dependent on phosphate mining, the village economy is now based on cultivation of sugar cane, commercial fishing, and seasonal tourism. There is no port on the island and ships must be loaded/offloaded by crane.

== Transport ==
The island has an airport, Kitadaito Airport, with one flight a day to Minami-Daito Airport

== Education ==
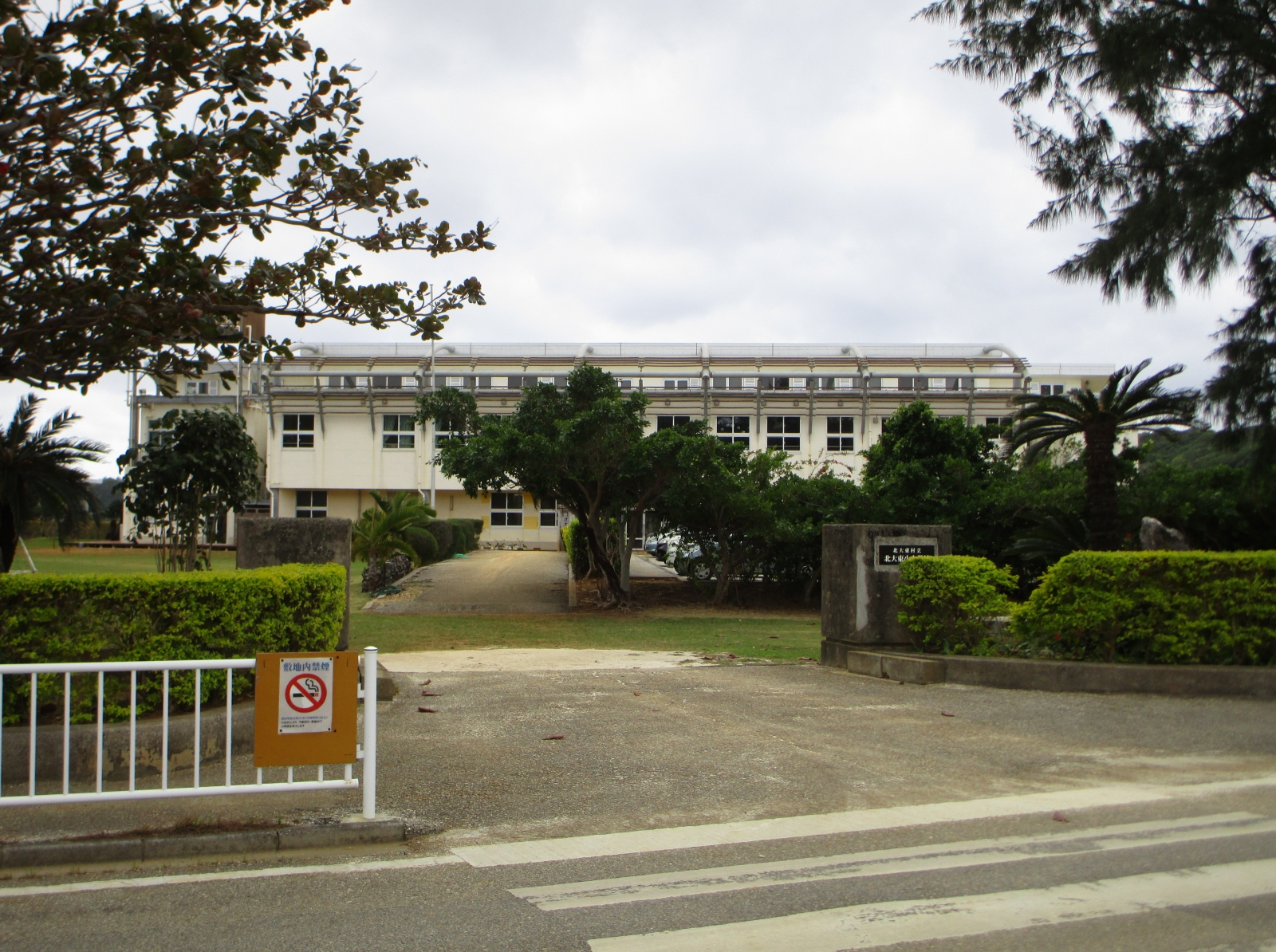
Kitadaito Village Kitadaito Elementary-Junior High School

There is the Kitadaito Village Kitadaito Elementary-Junior High School (北大東村立北大東小中学校 Kitadaitō Sonritsu Kitadaitō Shōchūgakkō) and the Kitadaito Village Kitadaito Kindergarten (北大東村立北大東幼稚園 Kitadaitō Sonritsu Kitadaitō Yōchien).

== Cultural Properties ==
- Name (Japanese) (Type of registration)

=== Cultural Properties ===
- Former Tōyō Sugar Kitadaitō Branch (旧東洋製糖北大東出張所) (National)
- Former Tōyō Sugar rock phosphate cargo pier (旧東洋製糖燐鉱石積荷桟橋) (National)
- Former Tōyō Sugar rock phosphate storage facility (旧東洋製糖燐鉱石貯蔵庫) (National)
- Former Tōyō Sugar Employee Bathhouse water tank and bathtub (旧東洋製糖社員浴場貯水タンク・風呂場) (National)
- Former Tōyō Sugar Shimosaka Bathhouse water supply and bathtub (旧東洋製糖下阪浴場水取場・風呂場) (National)
- Nirokusō hotel (弐六荘) (National)
- Sueyoshi Family Residence (stone wall, main house) (末吉家住宅 石垣・主屋) (National)

=== Historic Sites ===
- Kitadaitō Island Rock Phosphate Mine Site (北大東島燐鉱山遺跡) (National)

=== Places of scenic beauty ===
- Kitadaitō Island Rock Phosphate Mine Site (北大東島燐鉱山遺跡) (National)

=== Natural Monuments ===
- Fan palm tree (Livistona chinensis) plant community of Nakano (中野のビロウ群落) (Municipal)
- Hokusendō Cave in Aza Nakano (北大東村字中野の北泉洞) (Prefectural)
- Kitadaitō Island Rock Phosphate Mine Site (北大東島燐鉱山遺跡) (National)
- Nagahagu cliffs and talus special plant community (長幕崖壁及び崖錐の特殊植物群落) (National)
