= Kitadaito Airport =

Kitadaito Airport 北大東空港
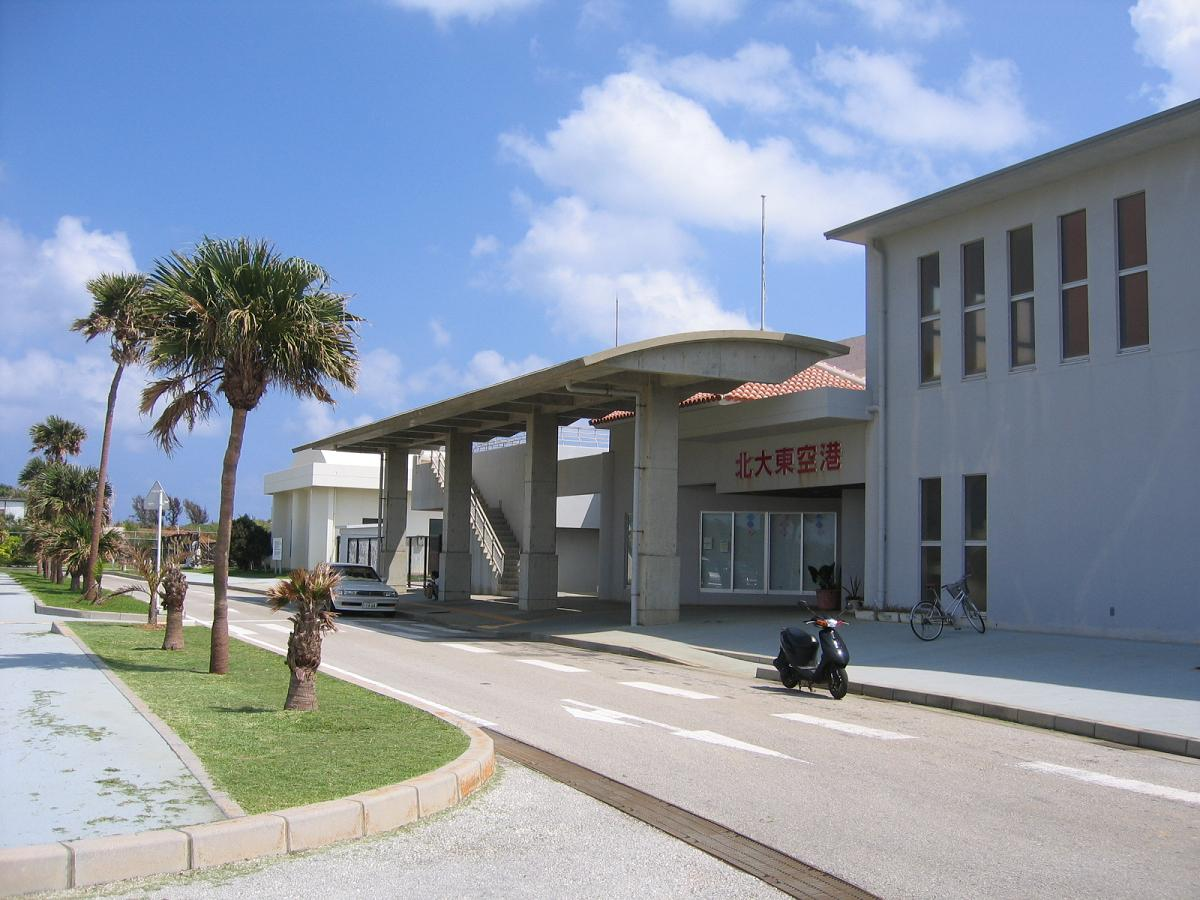
- IATA: KTD; ICAO: RORK

Summary
- Airport type: Public
- Operator: Okinawa Prefecture
- Location: Kitadaitō, Japan
- Elevation AMSL: 71 ft (22 m)
- Coordinates: 25°56′41″N 131°19′37″E

Map
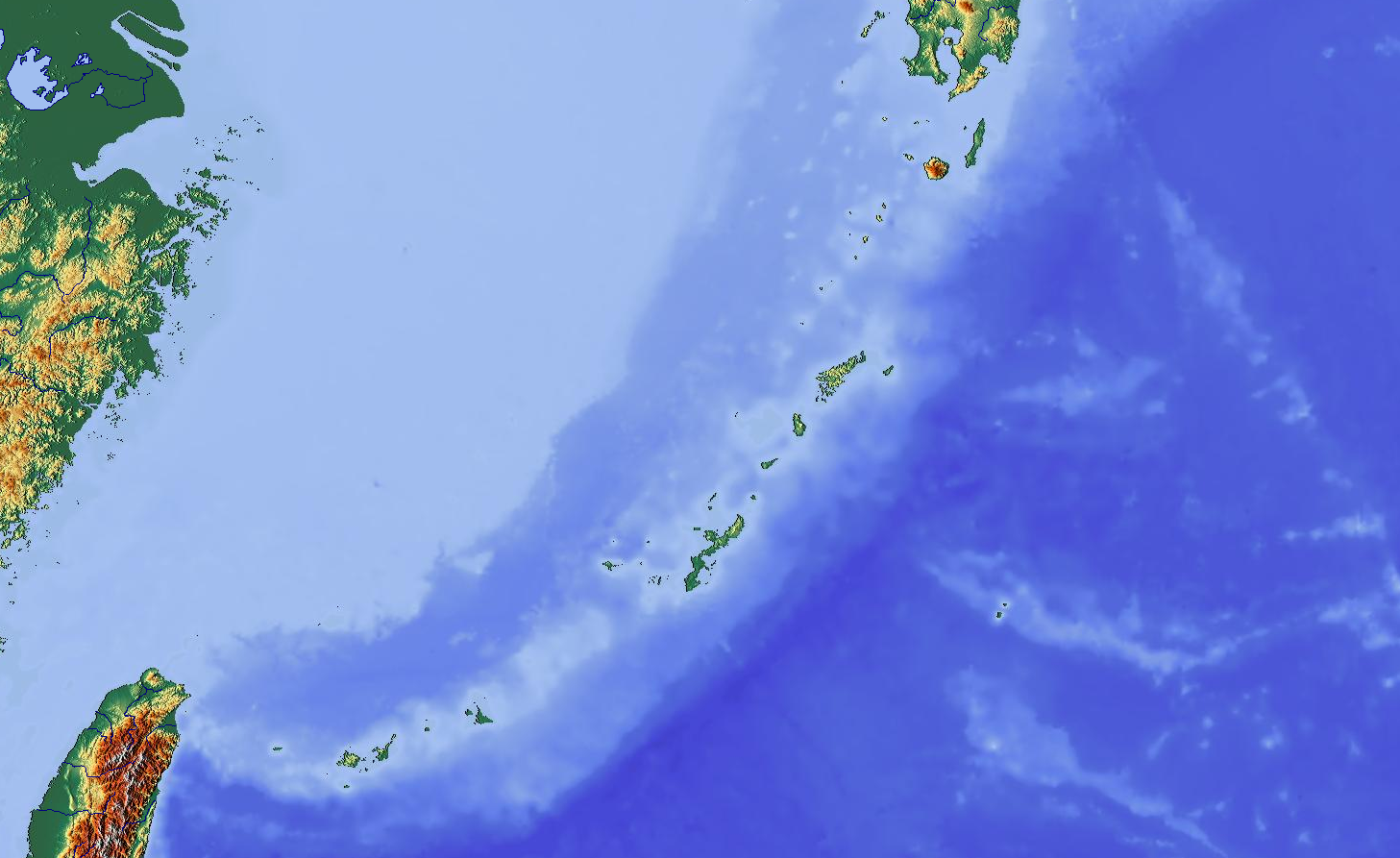
- Location in Japan RORK (Japan)

Runways
Direction	Length		Surface
Direction	m	ft	Surface
03/21	1,500	4,921	Asphalt concrete

Statistics (2015)
- Passengers: 17,208
- Cargo (metric tonnes): 67
- Aircraft movement: 770
- Source: Japanese Ministry of Land, Infrastructure, Transport and Tourism

Kitadaitō Airport (北大東空港, Kitadaitō Kūkō; (IATA: KTD, ICAO: RORK)) is located on the island of Kitadaitōjima in the village of Kitadaitō, Shimajiri District, Okinawa Prefecture, Japan.

The prefecture operates the airport, which is classified as a third class airport.

Only a flight from Naha to Kitadaitō is operated every day.

== History ==
Kitadaito Airport was opened in 1971 as an emergency 760 meter airstrip, constructed of crushed coral by the United States Civil Administration of the Ryukyu Islands. The runway was paved and extended to 800 meters in 1978, when scheduled passenger services commenced. The runway was extended to 1500 meters in 1997. At present, there is only one scheduled flight per day.

== Airlines and destinations ==
Airlines	Destinations
Ryukyu Air Commuter	Naha
