= Minamidaitō, Okinawa =

Minamidaitō 南大東村
- Village
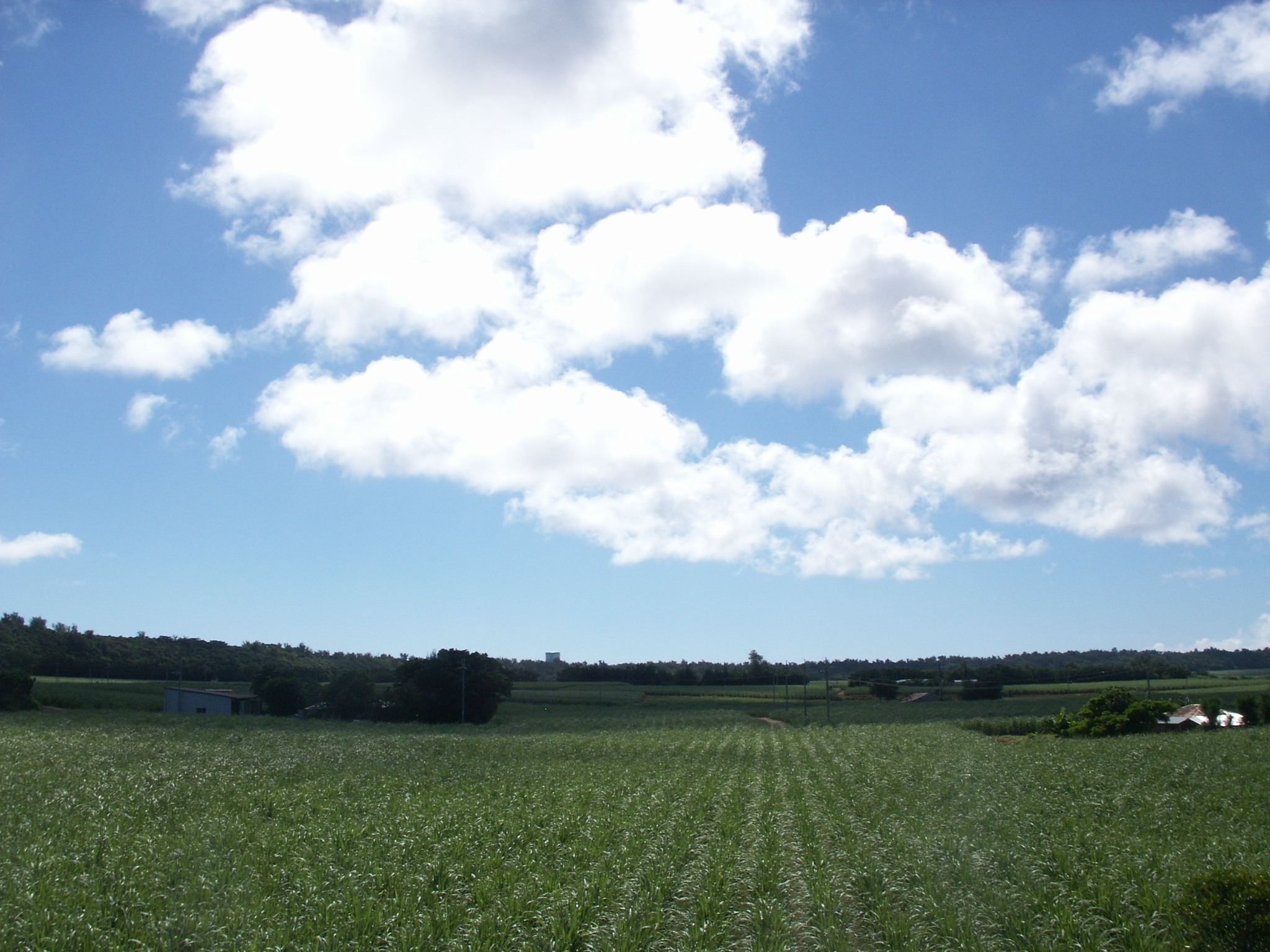
- Minamidaitō landscape

- Flag Emblem

- Location of Minamidaitō in Okinawa Prefecture

- Location in Japan
- Coordinates: 25°49′44″N 131°13′55″E
- Country: Japan
- Region: Kyushu (Ryukyu)
- Prefecture: Okinawa Prefecture
- District: Shimajiri

Government
  - Mayor: Kenshō Nakada

Area
  - Total: 30.57 km^{2} (11.80 sq mi)

Population (June 1, 2013)
  - Total: 1,418
  - Density: 46.4/km^{2} (120/sq mi)
- Time zone: UTC+09:00 (JST)
- City hall address: 144-1 Aza Minami, Minamidaitō-son, Shimajiri-gun, Okinawa-ken; 901-3895
- Climate: Af
- Website: www.vill.minamidaito.okinawa.jp
- Symbols
- Flower: Hibiscus
- Tree: Livistona

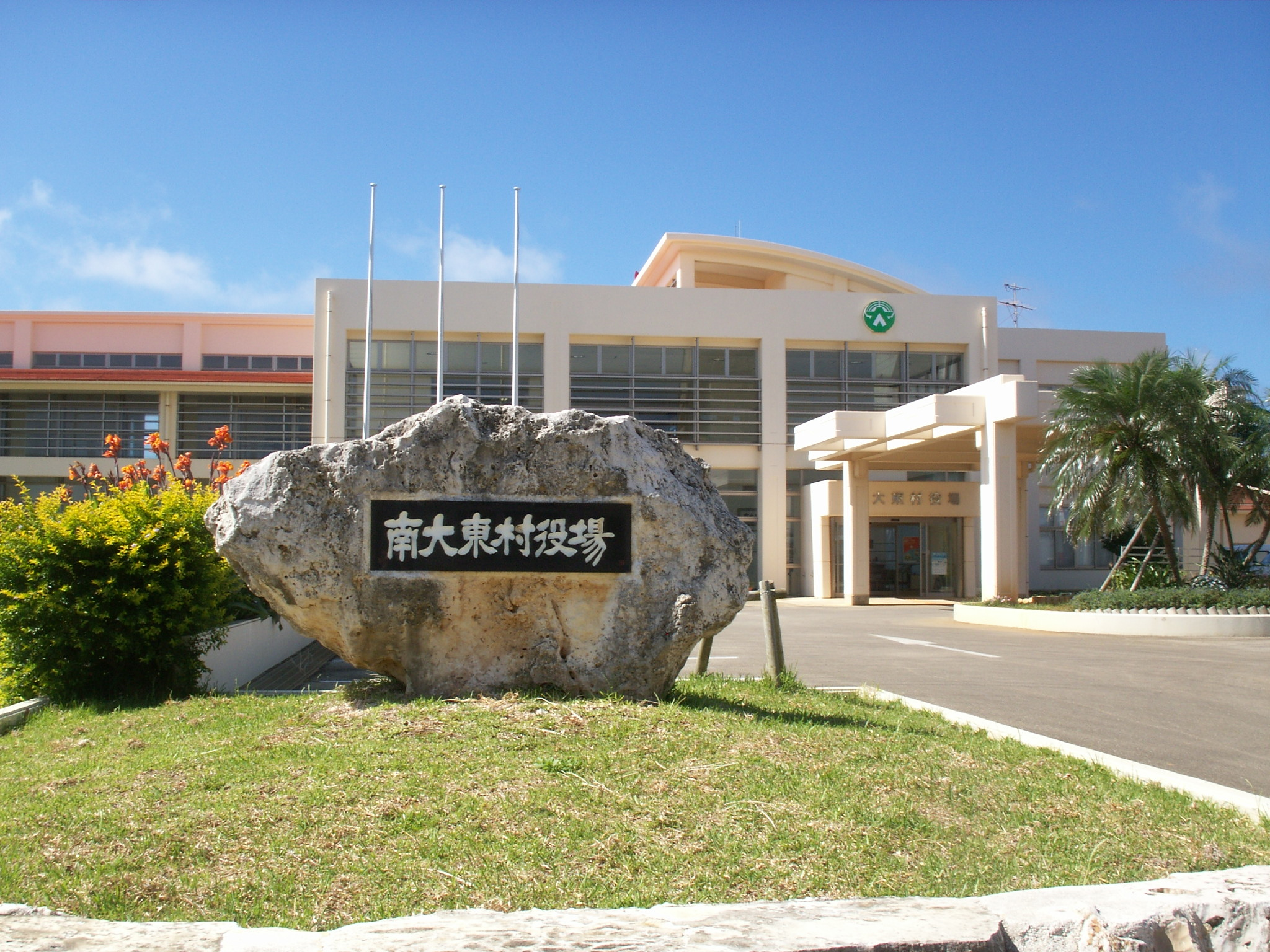
Minamidaitō Village Hall

Minamidaitō (南大東村, Minamidaitō-son) is a village located entirely on Minamidaitōjima in Shimajiri District, Okinawa Prefecture, Japan. Minamidaitōjima is located approximately 360 kilometres (220 mi) east of Okinawa Island. Minamidaitō covers 30.7 square kilometres (11.9 mi^{2}).

As of June 2013, the city had a population of 1,418 and a population density of 46.4 people per km^{2}.

== Geography ==
The island is in the subtropical zone and was formed out of coral reef. With the exception of neighboring Kitadaitō, there is no inhabited land within 400 km of Minamidaitō.

=== Administrative divisions ===
The village includes six wards.

- Ikenosawa (池之沢)
- Kita (北)
- Kyūtō (旧東)
- Minami (南)
- Shintō (新東)
- Zaisho (在所)

=== Climate ===
Minamidaitō has a tropical rainforest climate (Köppen climate classification Af) with very warm summers and mild winters. Precipitation is significant throughout the year; the wettest month is May and the driest month is February. The island is subject to frequent typhoons.

Climate data for Minamidaitō (1991−2020 normals, extremes 1942−present)
Month	Jan	Feb	Mar	Apr	May	Jun	Jul	Aug	Sep	Oct	Nov	Dec	Year
Record high °C (°F)	26.8 (80.2)	27.6 (81.7)	28.1 (82.6)	30.2 (86.4)	31.9 (89.4)	34.1 (93.4)	35.3 (95.5)	34.6 (94.3)	34.0 (93.2)	33.1 (91.6)	30.8 (87.4)	28.3 (82.9)	35.3 (95.5)
Mean maximum °C (°F)	25.0 (77.0)	25.1 (77.2)	26.1 (79.0)	28.0 (82.4)	29.9 (85.8)	32.0 (89.6)	33.2 (91.8)	33.0 (91.4)	32.6 (90.7)	31.1 (88.0)	28.9 (84.0)	26.2 (79.2)	33.4 (92.1)
Mean daily maximum °C (°F)	21.1 (70.0)	21.2 (70.2)	22.6 (72.7)	24.6 (76.3)	26.9 (80.4)	29.6 (85.3)	31.7 (89.1)	31.6 (88.9)	31.0 (87.8)	28.8 (83.8)	25.8 (78.4)	22.6 (72.7)	26.5 (79.6)
Daily mean °C (°F)	18.0 (64.4)	18.1 (64.6)	19.5 (67.1)	21.6 (70.9)	24.1 (75.4)	26.9 (80.4)	28.7 (83.7)	28.6 (83.5)	27.9 (82.2)	25.9 (78.6)	23.1 (73.6)	19.7 (67.5)	23.5 (74.3)
Mean daily minimum °C (°F)	14.6 (58.3)	14.8 (58.6)	16.4 (61.5)	18.8 (65.8)	21.5 (70.7)	24.8 (76.6)	25.9 (78.6)	25.9 (78.6)	25.0 (77.0)	23.0 (73.4)	20.4 (68.7)	16.6 (61.9)	20.6 (69.1)
Mean minimum °C (°F)	8.3 (46.9)	8.2 (46.8)	9.9 (49.8)	12.4 (54.3)	16.0 (60.8)	20.7 (69.3)	23.3 (73.9)	23.2 (73.8)	21.4 (70.5)	17.7 (63.9)	14.8 (58.6)	10.3 (50.5)	7.0 (44.6)
Record low °C (°F)	3.5 (38.3)	4.3 (39.7)	5.3 (41.5)	4.7 (40.5)	10.6 (51.1)	14.6 (58.3)	19.4 (66.9)	19.7 (67.5)	16.1 (61.0)	12.9 (55.2)	9.8 (49.6)	6.4 (43.5)	3.5 (38.3)
Average precipitation mm (inches)	77.0 (3.03)	79.9 (3.15)	84.2 (3.31)	113.6 (4.47)	222.0 (8.74)	199.6 (7.86)	118.0 (4.65)	151.1 (5.95)	167.9 (6.61)	180.5 (7.11)	120.9 (4.76)	124.7 (4.91)	1,639.3 (64.54)
Average precipitation days (≥ 1.0 mm)	8.4	7.8	7.3	8.0	10.6	9.4	8.1	10.5	10.7	10.4	8.6	8.7	108.5
Average relative humidity (%)	69	71	74	78	84	87	81	81	80	77	74	70	77
Mean monthly sunshine hours	121.3	120.3	154.0	152.8	171.0	219.3	277.8	249.3	220.4	178.4	136.4	120.8	2,121.7
Source: Japan Meteorological Agency

== History ==
Minamidaitōjima remained uninhabited until formally claimed by the Empire of Japan in 1885. In 1900, a team of pioneers from Hachijōjima, became the first human inhabitants of the island, and started the cultivation of sugar cane from 1903. Until World War II, Kitadaitōjima was owned in its entirety by Dai Nippon Sugar (now Dai Nippon Meiji Sugar). After World War II, the island was occupied by the United States. The village of Minamidaitō was established in 1946. Land reform was carried out in favor of the residents of Minamidaitō in 1964. A freight train system was established and later dismantled in favor of contemporary transportation. The island was returned to Japan in 1972.

== Economy ==
Sugarcane is the chief product of the village, and is cultivated in the central lowlands of the island. There is also seasonal tourism and commercial fishing.

Rum is produced here. Grace Rum distillery, founded in 2004 is producing there two kinds of rum, Cor Cor red label and Cor Cor Green label, made from molasses and sugar juice respectively.

== Transportation ==
Minami-Daito Airport, located at the east of the island, connects Minamidaitō with the nearby island of Kitadaitō and Naha, Okinawa. Okinawa Prefecture operates the airport, and classifies it as a third class airport. There is no port on the island and ships must be loaded/offloaded by crane.

== Education ==
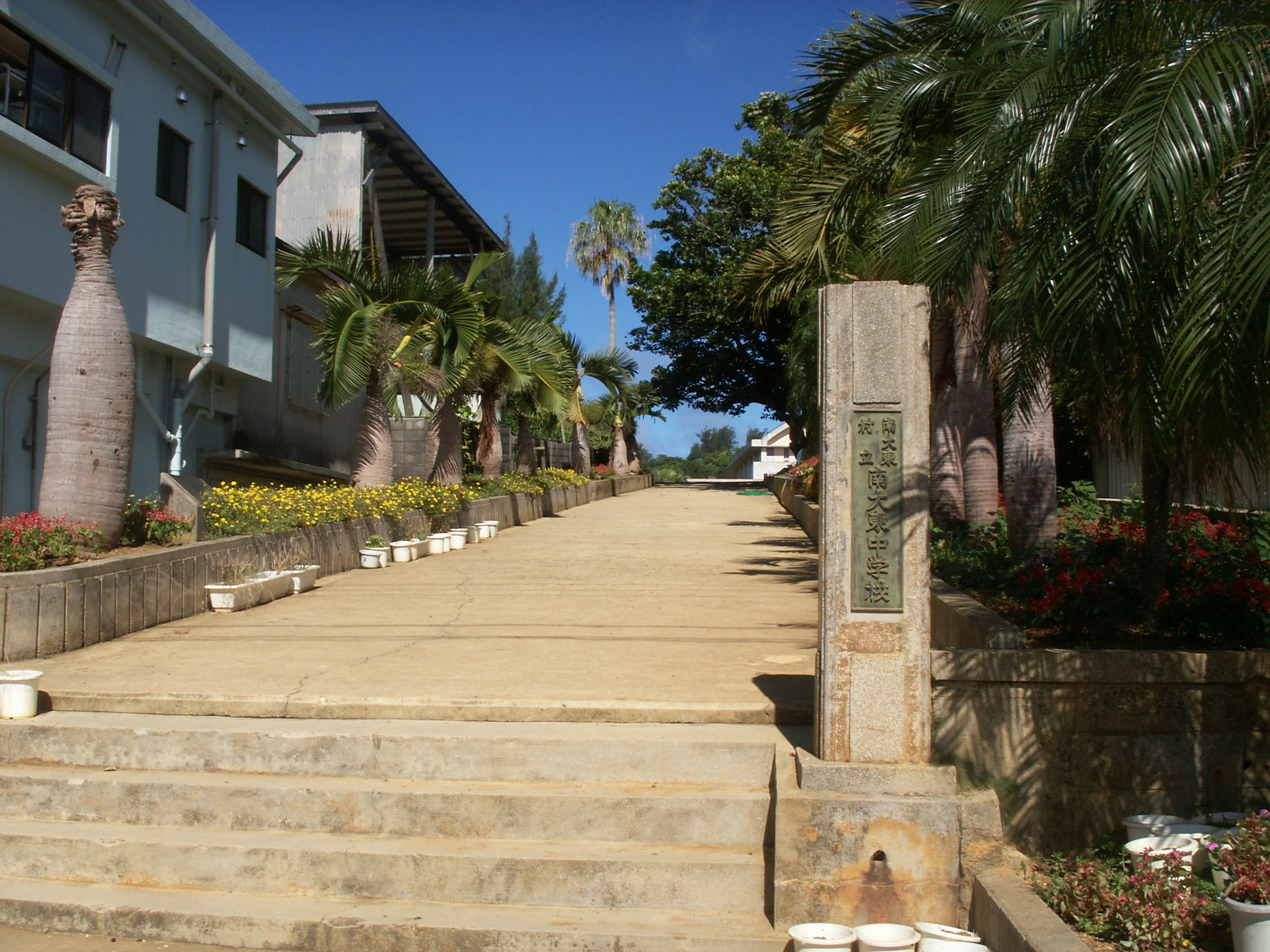
Minamidaitō Junior High School in 2007

The village of Minamidaitō maintains a single school: Minamidaitō Elementary and Junior High School (南大東村立南大東小中学校). As of 2010 the school had 95 elementary students and 49 junior high students. The village has no high school; students leave the island to complete their secondary education.

== Minamidaitō in popular culture ==
In 2013, a motion picture called Leaving on the 15th Spring (旅立ちの島唄 – 十五の春, Tabidachi no shima uta – jūgo no haru) was released. Themes include the relationship between inhabitants of Minamidaitō and Kitadaitō and families being torn apart because of the lack of a senior high school on the island.

== Cultural Properties ==
- Name (Japanese) (Type of registration)

=== Cultural Properties ===
- Minamidaitō Island west harbour former boiler room (南大東島西港旧ボイラー小屋) (National)

=== Natural Monuments ===
- Lake Ōike black mangrove community Bruguiera gymnorhiza (大池のオヒルギ群落) (National)
- Minamidaitō Island east coast plant community (南大東島東海岸植物群落) (National)
