= Minami-Daito Airport =

Minami-Daito Airport 南大東空港
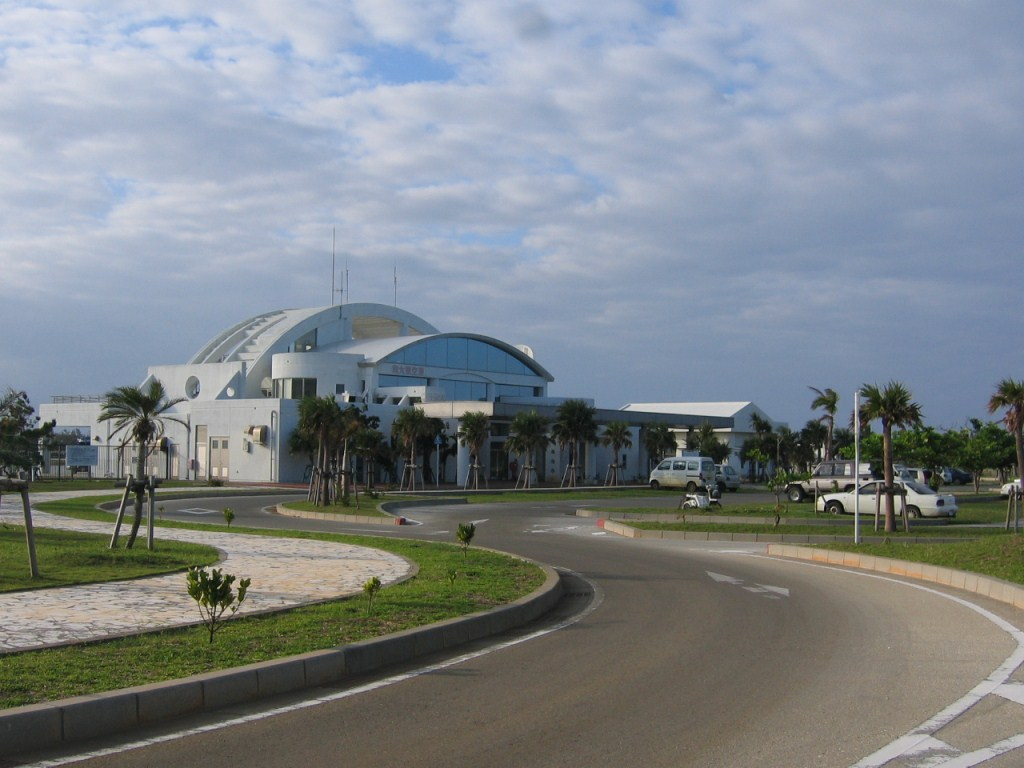
- IATA: MMD; ICAO: ROMD

Summary
- Airport type: Public
- Operator: Okinawa Prefecture
- Location: Minami Daito, Okinawa, Japan
- Elevation AMSL: 159 ft (48 m)
- Coordinates: 25°50′48″N 131°15′49″E

Map
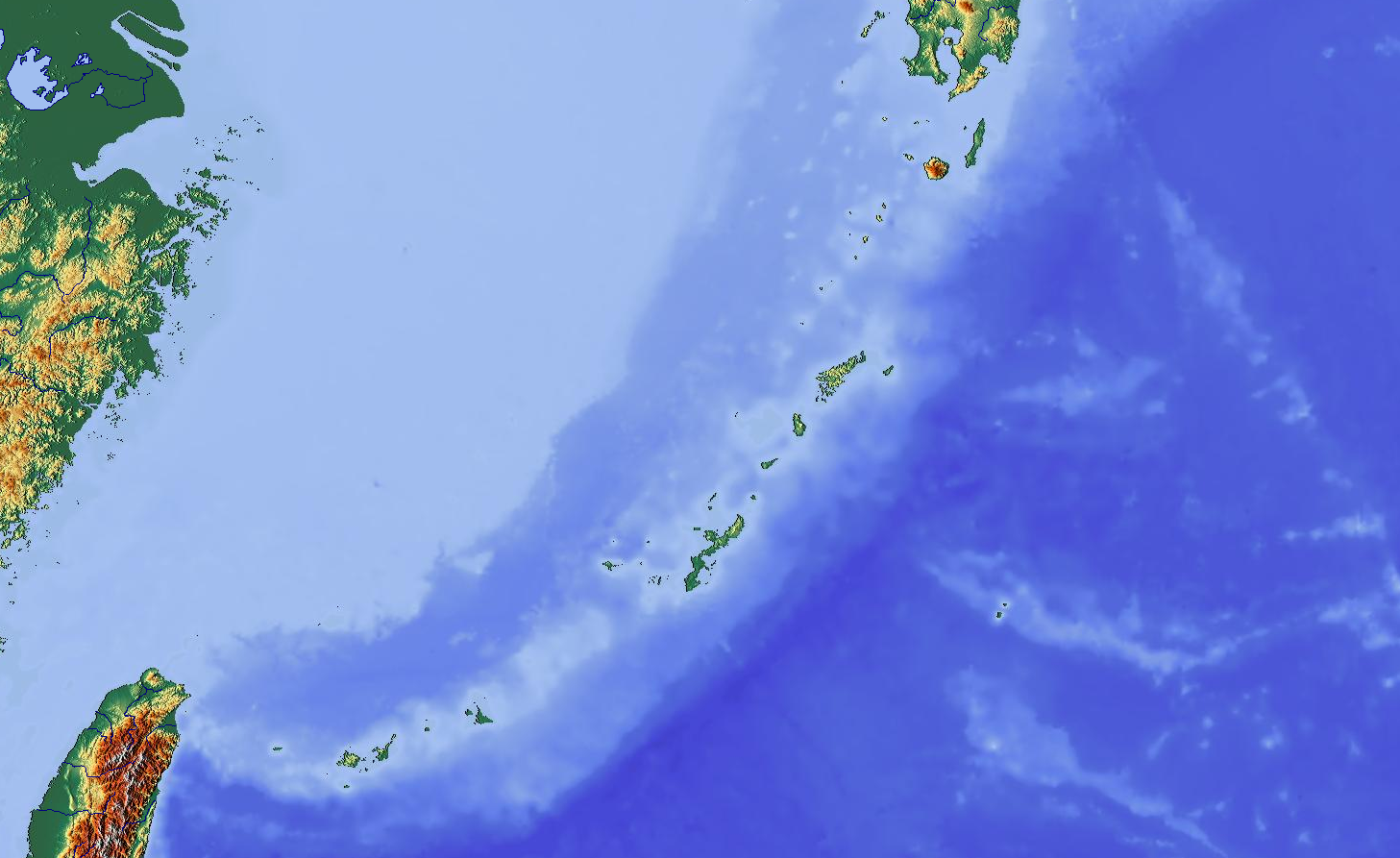
- Location in Japan 25°50′48″N 131°15′49″E ROMD (Japan)

Runways
Direction	Length		Surface
Direction	m	ft	Surface
02/20	1,500	4,921	Asphalt concrete

Statistics (2015)
- Passengers: 42,444
- Cargo (metric tonnes): 224
- Aircraft movement: 1,584
- Source: Japanese Ministry of Land, Infrastructure, Transport and Tourism

Minamidaito Airport (南大東空港, Minamidaitō Kūkō; (IATA: MMD, ICAO: ROMD)) is an airport in Minamidaitō, Shimajiri District, Okinawa Prefecture, Japan.

The prefecture operates the airport, which is classified as a third class airport.

Only a flight from Naha to Minami-Daito is operated every day.

== History ==
The original Minamidaito Airport began as an air base for the Imperial Japanese Navy in 1934. The first civilian operations began in March 1961. The runway was repaired in June 1963 and expanded to 1,200 meters in December 1968 in order to accommodate NAMC YS-11 aircraft. However, with the reversion of the island to Japanese control in 1972, it was found that the approach way was not in conformance with Japanese Aviation Law, so the runway needed to be treated as shorter than its actual length. A new 800 meter runway was completed in August 1974.

The airport was relocated to its present location and upgraded to accommodate larger flights in July 1997 with the present 1500 meter runway.

== Airlines and destinations ==
Airlines	Destinations
Ryukyu Air Commuter	Naha
