= Kitadaitōjima =

Island within Ryukyu Islands

Native name: 北大東島 Kitadaitōjima
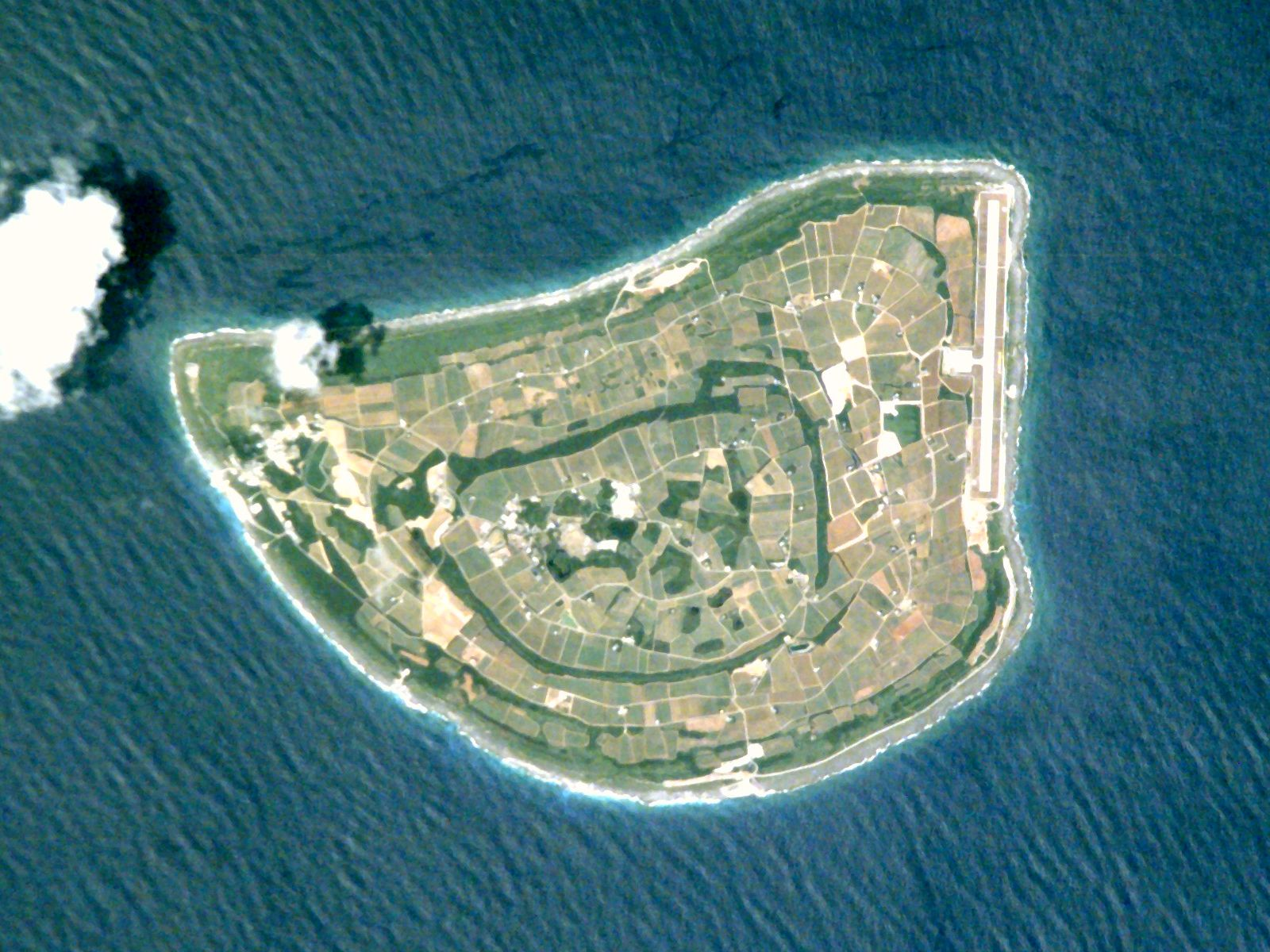
- Aerial Photograph of Kitadaitōjima

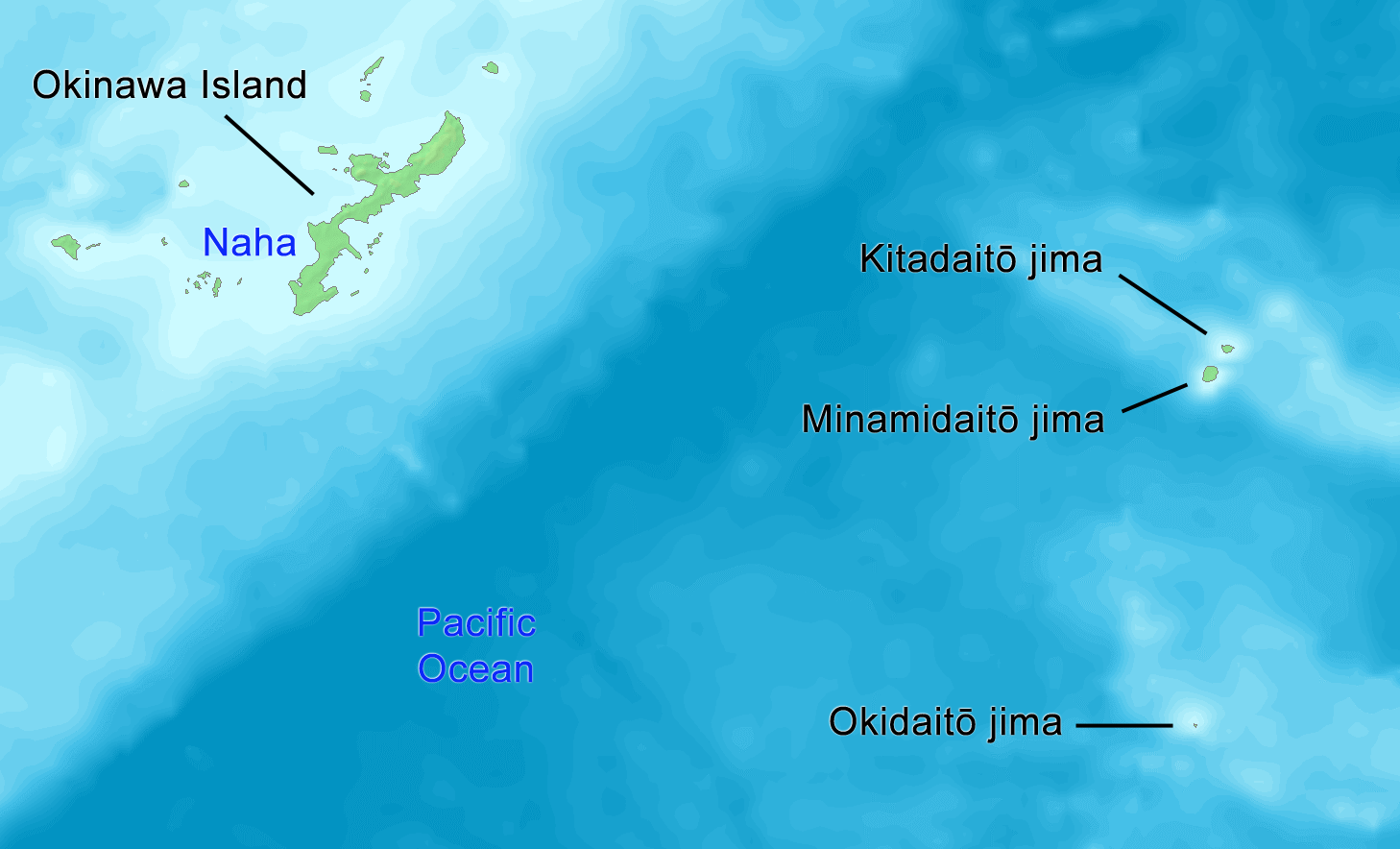

Geography
- Location: Philippine Sea
- Coordinates: 25°57′N 131°18′E
- Archipelago: Daitō Islands
- Area: 11.94 km^{2} (4.61 sq mi)
- Length: 4.85 km (3.014 mi)
- Coastline: 18.3 km (11.37 mi)
- Highest elevation: 75 m (246 ft)
- Highest point: Daijinguyama

Administration
- Japan
- Prefectures: Okinawa Prefecture
- District: Shimajiri District
- Village: Kitadaitō

Demographics
- Population: 660 (June 2013)
- Ethnic groups: Ryukyuan, Japanese

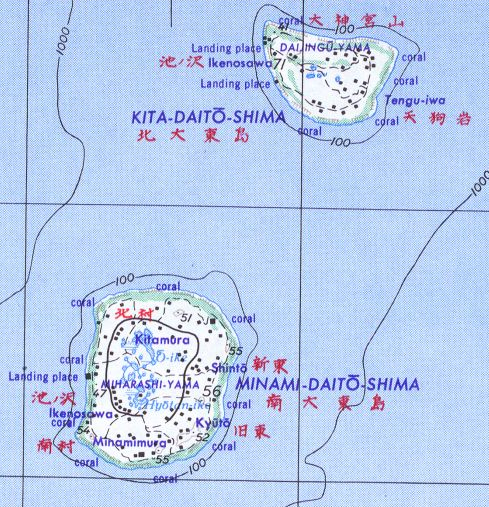
Map of Kitadaitō

Kitadaitōjima (北大東島), also spelled as Kita Daitō, Kita-Daitō-shima, and Kitadaitō, is the northernmost island in the Daitō Islands group, located in the Philippine Sea southeast of Okinawa, Japan. It is administered as part of the village of Kitadaitō, Shimajiri District, Okinawa. The island is entirely cultivated for agriculture. The island has no beaches but has a fishing harbor, three ferry docks and an airport (Kitadaito Airport) (airport code "KTD") for local flights.

== Geography ==
Kitadaitōjima is a relatively isolated coralline island, located approximately 9 kilometres (4.9 nmi) north of Minamidaitōjima, the largest island of the archipelago, and 360 kilometres (190 nmi) from Naha, Okinawa. As with the other islands in the archipelago, Kitadaitōjima is an uplifted coral atoll with a steep coastal cliff of limestone (the former fringing coral reef of the island), and a depressed center (the former lagoon of the island). The island is roughly oval in shape, with a circumference of about 13.52 kilometres (8.40 mi), length of 4.85 kilometres (3.01 mi) and an area of 11.94 square kilometres (4.61 sq mi). The highest point is 74 metres (243 ft) above sea level. The interior of the island contains a few small freshwater ponds.

The 660 (as of June 1, 2013) inhabitants live in a village in the center of the island.

=== Gallery ===
Gallery

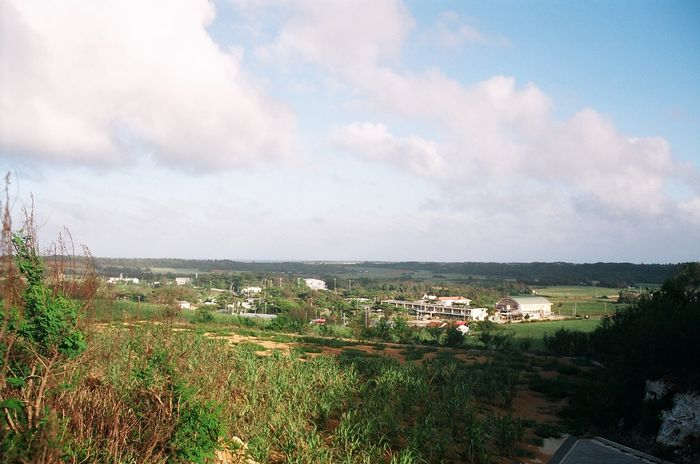
A village in the interior of the island.

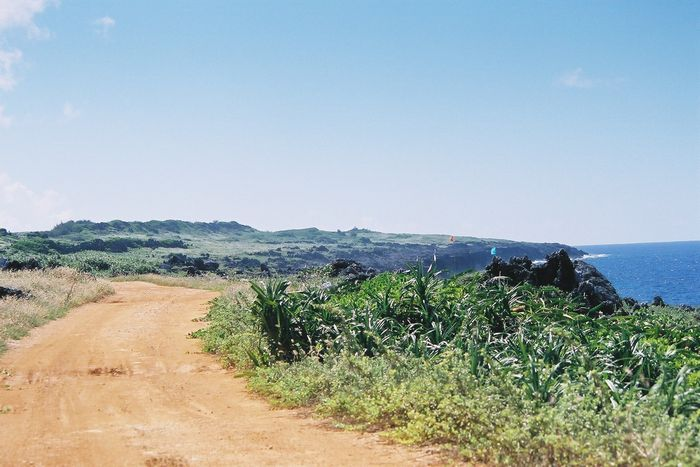
A natural area

=== Climate ===
Kitadaitōjima has a tropical rainforest climate (Köppen climate classification Af) with very warm summers and mild winters. The average annual temperature in Kitadaitōjima is 23.9 °C (75.0 °F). Precipitation is significant throughout the year; the wettest month is May and the driest month is February. The island is subject to frequent typhoons. The average annual rainfall is 1,469.0 mm (57.83 in) with September as the wettest month. The temperatures are highest on average in August, at around 29.2 °C (84.6 °F), and lowest in January, at around 18.5 °C (65.3 °F). Its record high is 34.9 °C (94.8 °F), reached on 7 September 2017, and its record low is 8.2 °C (46.8 °F), reached on 15 February 2015.

Climate data for Kitadaitō (2003−2020 normals, extremes 2003−present)
Month	Jan	Feb	Mar	Apr	May	Jun	Jul	Aug	Sep	Oct	Nov	Dec	Year
Record high °C (°F)	26.4 (79.5)	27.0 (80.6)	27.8 (82.0)	29.6 (85.3)	32.4 (90.3)	33.4 (92.1)	33.8 (92.8)	34.5 (94.1)	34.9 (94.8)	33.0 (91.4)	30.3 (86.5)	28.3 (82.9)	34.9 (94.8)
Mean daily maximum °C (°F)	20.9 (69.6)	21.2 (70.2)	22.3 (72.1)	24.3 (75.7)	26.9 (80.4)	29.7 (85.5)	31.8 (89.2)	31.9 (89.4)	31.2 (88.2)	29.1 (84.4)	26.1 (79.0)	22.5 (72.5)	26.5 (79.7)
Daily mean °C (°F)	18.5 (65.3)	18.8 (65.8)	19.6 (67.3)	21.6 (70.9)	24.4 (75.9)	27.1 (80.8)	29.1 (84.4)	29.2 (84.6)	28.5 (83.3)	26.5 (79.7)	23.7 (74.7)	20.3 (68.5)	23.9 (75.1)
Mean daily minimum °C (°F)	16.2 (61.2)	16.5 (61.7)	17.5 (63.5)	19.5 (67.1)	22.3 (72.1)	25.2 (77.4)	26.9 (80.4)	27.0 (80.6)	26.3 (79.3)	24.5 (76.1)	21.8 (71.2)	18.2 (64.8)	21.8 (71.3)
Record low °C (°F)	8.6 (47.5)	8.2 (46.8)	9.9 (49.8)	12.0 (53.6)	15.9 (60.6)	20.0 (68.0)	22.5 (72.5)	23.4 (74.1)	20.8 (69.4)	18.2 (64.8)	14.8 (58.6)	10.8 (51.4)	8.2 (46.8)
Average precipitation mm (inches)	67.1 (2.64)	65.7 (2.59)	70.5 (2.78)	112.6 (4.43)	210.5 (8.29)	206.4 (8.13)	79.4 (3.13)	126.1 (4.96)	145.1 (5.71)	175.8 (6.92)	104.7 (4.12)	105.1 (4.14)	1,469 (57.83)
Average precipitation days (≥ 1.0 mm)	8.5	7.2	6.6	7.7	10.8	10.1	6.7	10.2	10.1	10.4	8.2	9.2	105.7
Source: Japan Meteorological Agency

== History ==
It is uncertain when Kitadaitōjima was discovered. It is the most likely that their first sighting was by the Spanish navigator Bernardo de la Torre in 1543, in between 25 September and 2 October, during his abortive attempt to reach New Spain from the Philippines with the San Juan de Letran. It was then charted, together with Minamidaitōjima, as Las Dos Hermanas (The Two Sisters). There is little doubt that Minamidaitōjima and Kitadaitōjima were again sighted by the Spanish on 28 July 1587, by Pedro de Unamuno who named them Islas sin Probecho (Useless Islands). However, on 2 July 1820, the Russian vessel Borodino surveyed the two Daitō islands and named the south as "South Borodino Island".

The island remained uninhabited until claimed by the Empire of Japan in 1885. In 1900, a team of pioneers from Hachijōjima, an island located 287 kilometres (178 mi) south of Tokyo led by Tamaoki Han'emon (1838 – 1910), who had pioneered settlement on Minamidaitōjima, became the first human inhabitants of the islands, and started the cultivation of sugar cane from 1903.

During this period until World War II, Kitadaitōjima was owned in its entirety by Dai Nippon Sugar (now Dai Nippon Meiji Sugar), which also operated mines for the extraction of guano for use in fertilizer. Many of the inhabitants were seasonal workers from Okinawa and Taiwan. After World War II, the island was occupied by the United States. The use of increased mechanization increased phosphate yields marginally until the deposits were exhausted by the mid-1950s. The island was returned to Japan in 1972.
