= Imperial Japanese Army =

Principal ground force of the Empire of Japan

- 大日本帝國陸軍; Dai-Nippon Teikoku Rikugun
- The ensign of the Imperial Japanese Army
- Active: 1871
- Disbanded: 1945
- Country: Empire of Japan
- Type: Army
- Role: Military ground force
- Size: 6,095,000 in August 1945
- Part of: Imperial Armed Forces
- Colors: Red White
- March: "Army March"
- Equipment: Army equipment
- Engagements: Boshin War; Invasion of Taiwan (1874); Shinpūren rebellion; Satsuma Rebellion; First Sino-Japanese War; Boxer Rebellion; Invasion of Taiwan (1895); Russo-Japanese War; World War I; Russian Civil War; Japanese invasion of Manchuria; Second Sino-Japanese War; World War II

Commanders
- Emperor of Japan: Meiji; Taishō; Shōwa
- Minister of the Army: Ōyama Iwao (first); Sadamu Shimomura (last)
- Chief of the General Staff: Yamagata Aritomo (first); Yoshijirō Umezu (last)

Insignia
- Infantry Regimental Colour

The Imperial Japanese Army (IJA) (Note: Japanese: 大日本帝国陸軍, Hepburn: Dai-Nippon Teikoku Rikugun; lit. 'Army of the Great Japanese Empire') was the principal ground force of the Empire of Japan from 1871 to 1945. It played a central role in Japan's rapid modernization during the Meiji period. It also fought in numerous conflicts including the First Sino-Japanese War, Russo-Japanese War, World War I, Second Sino-Japanese War, World War II, and became a dominant force in Japanese politics. Initially formed from samurai domain armies that overthrew the Tokugawa Shogunate, it evolved after the Meiji Restoration into a powerful modern military influenced by French and German models, supported by its own air arm, the Imperial Japanese Army Air Service.

The IJA was responsible for several successful overseas military campaigns that resulted in the imperialist expansion of the Japanese Empire, including the First Sino-Japanese War, the invasion of Taiwan, the Russo-Japanese War, the seizure of German territories in Asia in World War I and the invasion of Manchuria. By the 1930s, the Army and Navy had largely subordinated the civilian government and controlled Japan. In the Second Sino-Japanese War, the IJA invaded and occupied the most populous parts of China proper, but fought to a stalemate as its lines of communication stretched deep into the Chinese interior. In the Pacific War, it initially achieved great success capturing vast swathes of territory across the Asia-Pacific, before being pushed back by island-hopping Allied offensives that reached the frontiers of Japan and enabled the large-scale bombing and blockade of Japan.

Notorious for committing widespread war crimes, including mass murder, mass rape and forced labour, the army was dissolved after Japan's surrender in 1945. The Japan Ground Self-Defense Force succeeded it as Japan's ground warfare service.

== History ==
=== Origins (1868–1871) ===
In the mid-19th century, Japan had no unified national army and the country was made up of feudal domains (han) with the Tokugawa shogunate (bakufu) in overall control, which had ruled Japan since 1603. The bakufu army, although a large force, was only one among others, and bakufu efforts to control the nation depended upon the cooperation of its vassals' armies. The opening of the country after two centuries of seclusion subsequently led to the Meiji Restoration and the Boshin War in 1868. The domains of Satsuma and Chōshū came to dominate the coalition against the shogunate.

==== Boshin War ====
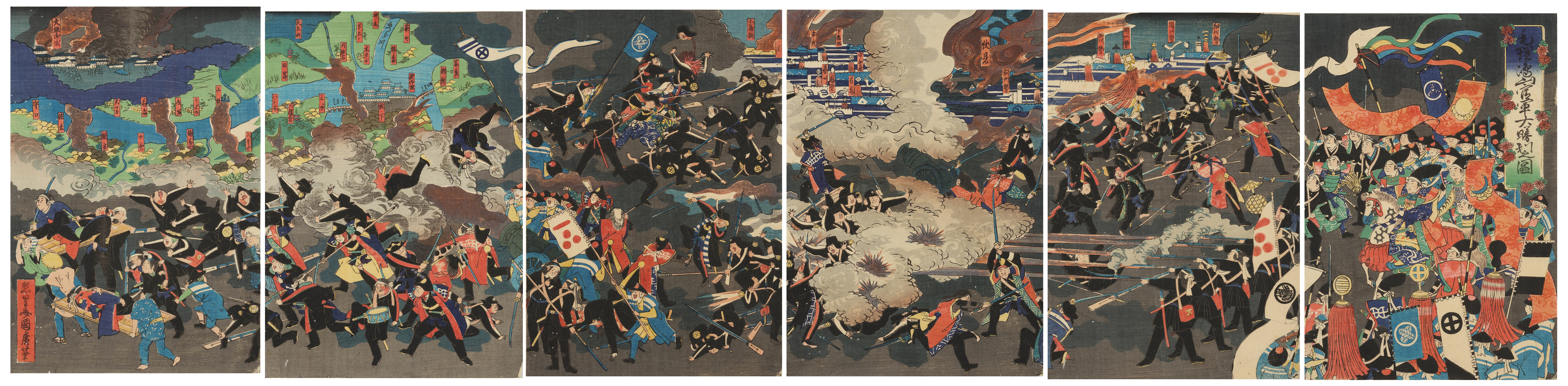
Ukiyo-e, depicting the retreat of shogunate forces in front of the Imperial Army (Kangun). Yodo Castle is shown in the background.

On 27 January 1868, tensions between the shogunate and imperial sides came to a head when Tokugawa Yoshinobu marched on Kyoto, accompanied by a 15,000-strong force, some of which had been trained by French military advisers. They were opposed by 5,000 troops from the Satsuma, Chōshū, and Tosa domains. At the two road junctions of Toba and Fushimi just south of Kyoto, the two forces clashed. On the second day, an Imperial banner was given to the defending troops and a member of the Imperial Family, the Prince Ninnaji, was named nominal commander in chief, in effect making the pro-imperial forces officially an Imperial army. (Note: 官軍, kangun) The bakufu forces eventually retreated to Osaka, with the remaining forces ordered to retreat to Edo. Yoshinobu and his closest advisors left for Edo by ship. The encounter at Toba–Fushimi between the imperial and shogunate forces marked the beginning of the conflict. With the court in Kyoto firmly behind the Satsuma-Chōshū-Tosa coalition, other domains that were sympathetic to the cause – such as Tottori (Inaba), Aki (Hiroshima), and Hizen (Saga) – emerged to take a more active role in military operations. Western domains that had either supported the shogunate or remained neutral also quickly announced their support of the restoration movement.

The nascent Meiji state required a new military command for its operations against the shogunate. In 1868, the "Imperial Army" being just a loose amalgam of domain armies, the government created four military divisions: the Tōkaidō, Tōsandō, San'indō, and Hokurikudō, each of which was named for a major highway. Overseeing these four armies was a new high command, the Eastern Expeditionary High Command (Tōsei daisō tokufu), whose nominal head was prince Arisugawa-no-miya, with two court nobles as senior staff officers. This connected the loose assembly of domain forces with the imperial court, which was the only national institution in a still unformed nation-state. The army continually emphasized its link with the imperial court: firstly, to legitimize its cause; secondly, to brand enemies of the imperial government as enemies of the court and traitors; and, lastly, to gain popular support. To supply food, weapons, and other supplies for the campaign, the imperial government established logistical relay stations along three major highways. These small depots held stockpiled material supplied by local pro-government domains, or confiscated from the bakufu and others opposing the imperial government. Local villagers were routinely impressed as porters to move and deliver supplies between the depots and frontline units.

==== Struggles to form a centralized army ====
Initially, the new army fought under makeshift arrangements, with unclear channels of command and control and no reliable recruiting base. Although fighting for the imperial cause, many of the units were loyal to their domains rather than the imperial court. In March 1869, the imperial government created various administrative offices, including a military branch; and in the following month organized an imperial bodyguard of 400 to 500, which consisted of Satsuma and Chōshū troops strengthened by veterans of the encounter at Toba–Fushimi, as well as yeoman and masterless samurai from various domains. The imperial court told the domains to restrict the size of their local armies and to contribute to funding a national officers' training school in Kyoto. However, within a few months the government disbanded both the military branch and the imperial bodyguard: the former was ineffective while the latter lacked modern weaponry and equipment. To replace them, two new organizations were created. One was the military affairs directorate which was composed of two bureaus, one for the army and one for the navy. The directorate drafted an army from troop contributions from each domain proportional to each domain's annual rice production (koku). This conscript army (chōheigun) integrated samurai and commoners from various domains into its ranks. As the war continued, the military affairs directorate expected to raise troops from the wealthier domains and, in June, the organization of the army was fixed, where each domain was required to send ten men for each 10,000 koku of rice produced. However, this policy put the imperial government in direct competition with the domains for military recruitment, which was not rectified until April 1868, when the government banned the domains from enlisting troops. Consequently, the quota system never fully worked as intended and was abolished the following year.

The Imperial forces encountered numerous difficulties during the war, especially during the campaign in Eastern Japan. Headquarters in faraway Kyoto often proposed plans at odds with the local conditions, which led to tensions with officers in the field, who in many cases ignored centralized direction in favor of unilateral action. The army lacked a strong central staff that was capable of enforcing orders. Consequently, military units were at the mercy of individual commanders' leadership and direction. This was not helped by the absence of a unified tactical doctrine, which left units to fight according to the tactics favored by their respective commanders. There was increased resentment by many lower ranked commanders as senior army positions were monopolized by the nobility together with samurai from Chōshū and Satsuma. The use of commoners within the new army created resentment among the samurai class. Although the nascent Meiji government achieved military success, the war left a residue of disgruntled warriors and marginalized commoners, together with a torn social fabric.

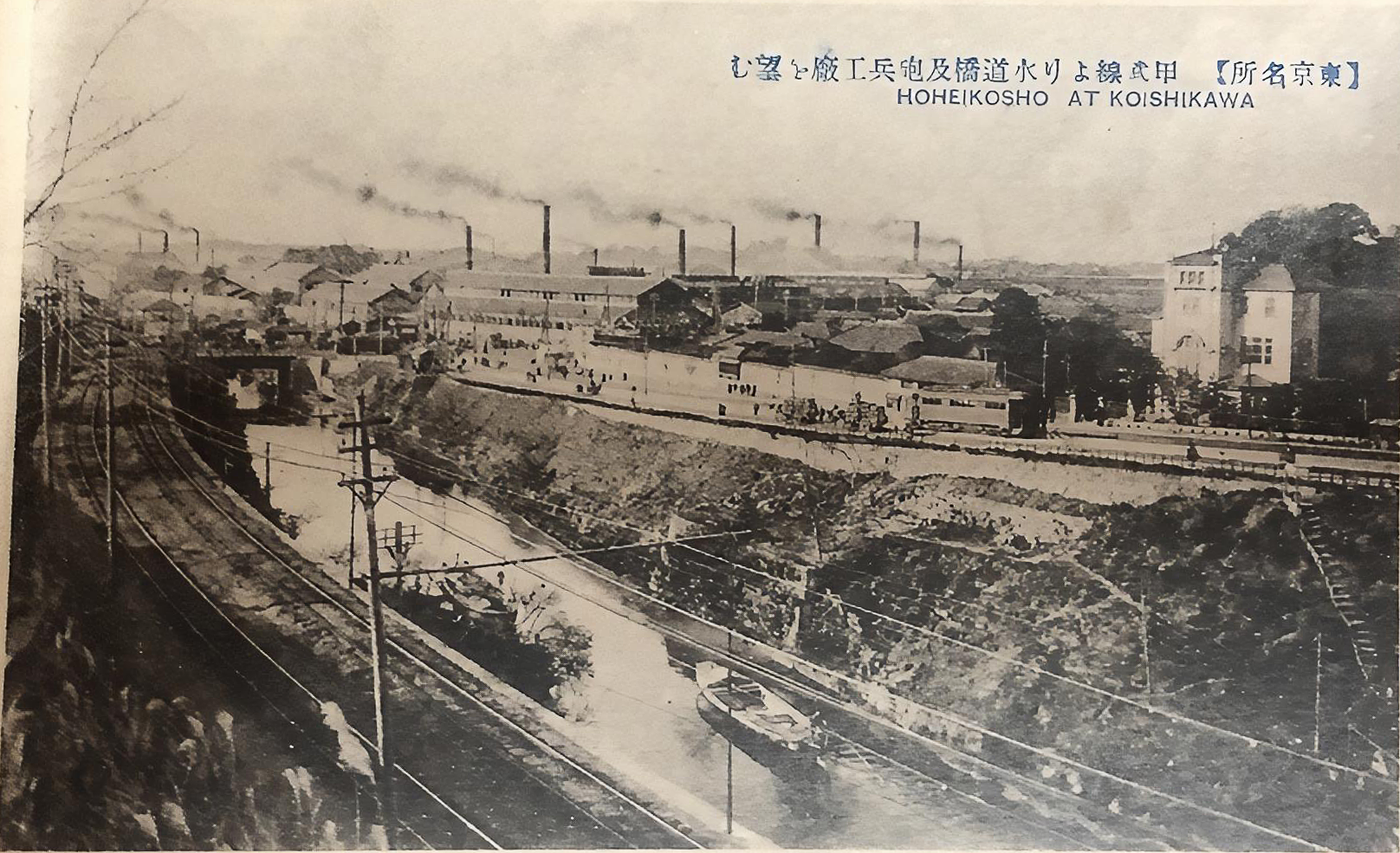
The Koishikawa Arsenal in Tokyo, inaugurated in 1871, soon after the Meiji restoration

=== Foundation of a national army (1871–1873) ===
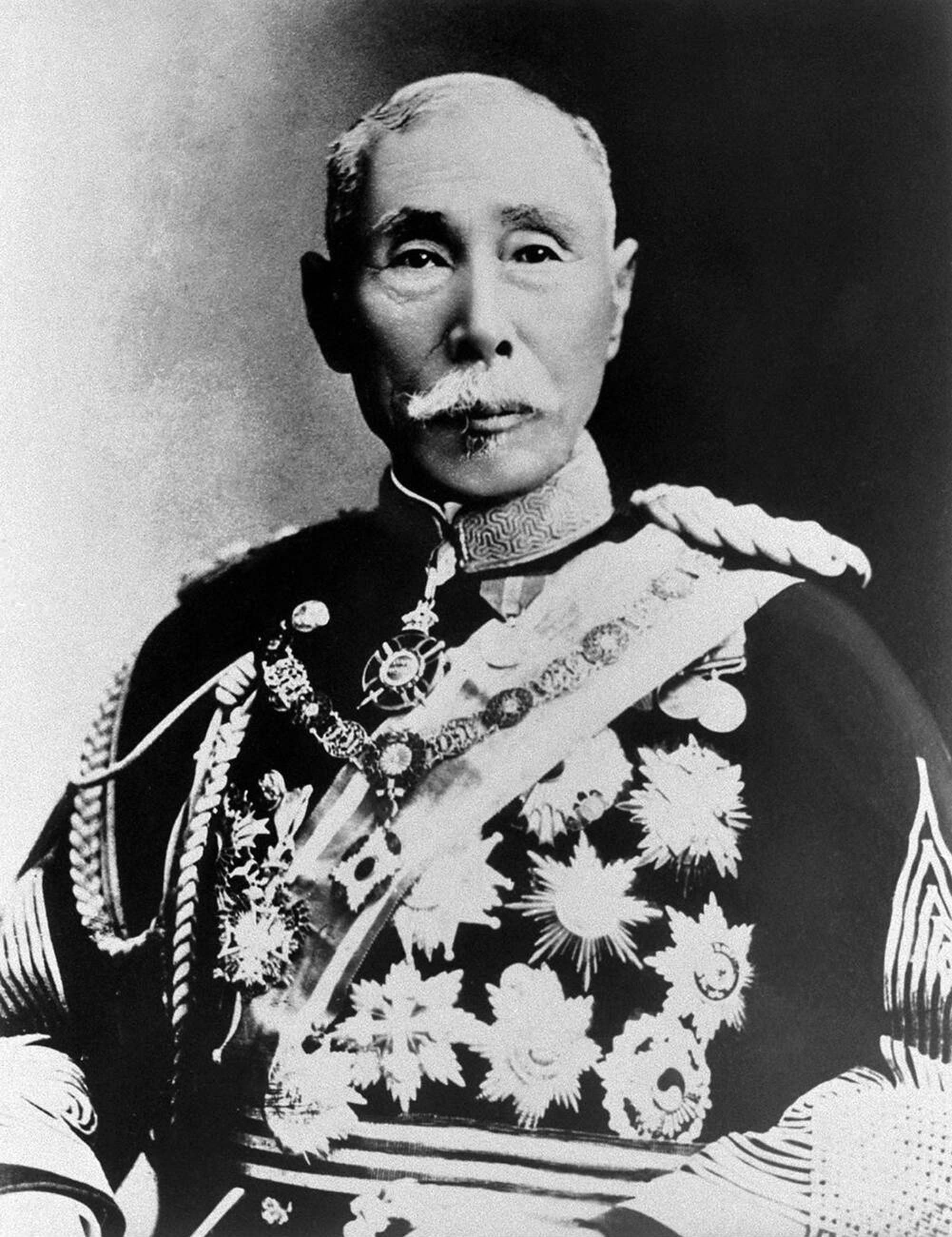
Prince Aritomo Yamagata, a field marshal in the Imperial Japanese Army and twice Prime Minister of Japan. He was one of the main architects of the military foundations of early modern Japan. Yamagata Aritomo can be seen as the father of Japanese militarism.

After the defeat of the Tokugawa shogunate and operations in Northeastern Honshu and Hokkaido a true national army did not exist. Many in the restoration coalition had recognized the need for a strong centralized authority and although the imperial side was victorious, the early Meiji government was weak and the leaders had to maintain their standing with their domains whose military forces was essential for whatever the government needed to achieve. The leaders of the restoration were divided over the future organization of the army. Ōmura Masujirō who had sought a strong central government at the expense of the domains advocated for the creation of a standing national army along European lines under the control of the government, the introduction of conscription for commoners and the abolition of the samurai class. Ōkubo Toshimichi preferred a small volunteer force consisting of former samurai. Ōmura's views for modernizing Japan's military led to his assassination in 1869 and his ideas were largely implemented after his death by Yamagata Aritomo. Aritomo has been described as the father of the Imperial Japanese Army. Yamagata had commanded mixed commoner-samurai Chōshū units during the Boshin War and was convinced of the merit of peasant soldiers. Although he himself was part of the samurai class, albeit of insignificant lower status, Yamagata distrusted the warrior class, several members of whom he regarded as clear dangers to the Meiji state.

==== Establishment of the Imperial Guard and institutional reforms ====
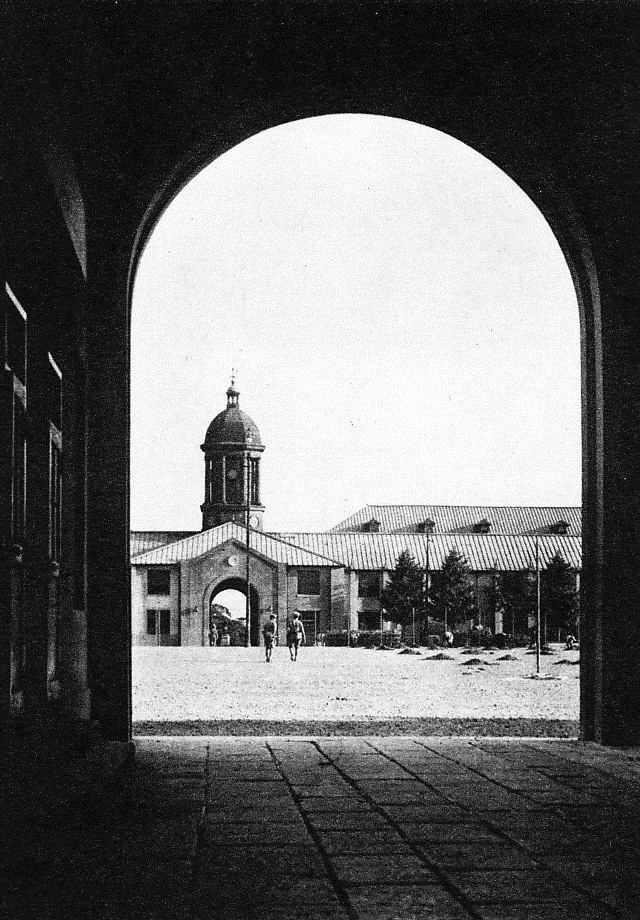
Barrack of the Imperial Guard, circa 1940

In March 1871, the War Ministry announced the creation of an Imperial Guard (Goshinpei) of six thousand men, consisting of nine infantry battalions, two artillery batteries and two cavalry squadrons. The emperor donated 100,000 ryō to underwrite the new unit, which was subordinate to the court. It was composed of members of the Satsuma, Chōshū and Tosa domains, who had led the restoration. Satsuma provided four battalions of infantry and four artillery batteries; Chōshū provided three battalions of infantry; Tosa two battalions of infantry, two squadrons of cavalry, and two artillery batteries. For the first time, the Meiji government was able to organize a large body of soldiers under a consistent rank and pay scheme with uniforms, which were loyal to the government rather than the domains. The Imperial Guard's principal mission was to protect the throne by suppressing domestic samurai revolts, peasant uprisings and anti-government demonstrations. The possession of this military force was a factor in the government's abolition of the han system.

The military ministry (Hyōbushō) was reorganized in July 1871; on August 29, simultaneously with the decree abolishing the domains, the Dajōkan ordered local daimyos to disband their private armies and turn their weapons over to the government. Although the government played on the foreign threat, especially Russia's southward expansion, to justify a national army, the immediately perceived danger was domestic insurrection. Consequently, on August 31, the country was divided into four military districts, each with its own chindai (garrison) to deal with peasant uprisings or samurai insurrections. The Imperial Guard formed the Tokyo garrison, whereas troops from the former domains filled the ranks of the Osaka, Kumamoto, and Sendai garrisons. The four garrisons had a total of about 8,000 troops – mostly infantry, but also a few hundred artillerymen and engineers. Smaller detachments of troops also guarded outposts at Kagoshima, Fushimi, Nagoya, Hiroshima, and elsewhere. By late December 1871, the army set modernization and coastal defense as priorities; long-term plans were devised for an armed force to maintain internal security, defend strategic coastal areas, train and educate military and naval officers, and build arsenals and supply depots. Despite previous rhetoric about the foreign menace, little substantive planning was directed against Russia. In February 1872, the military ministry was abolished and separate army and navy ministries were established.

==== Conscription ====
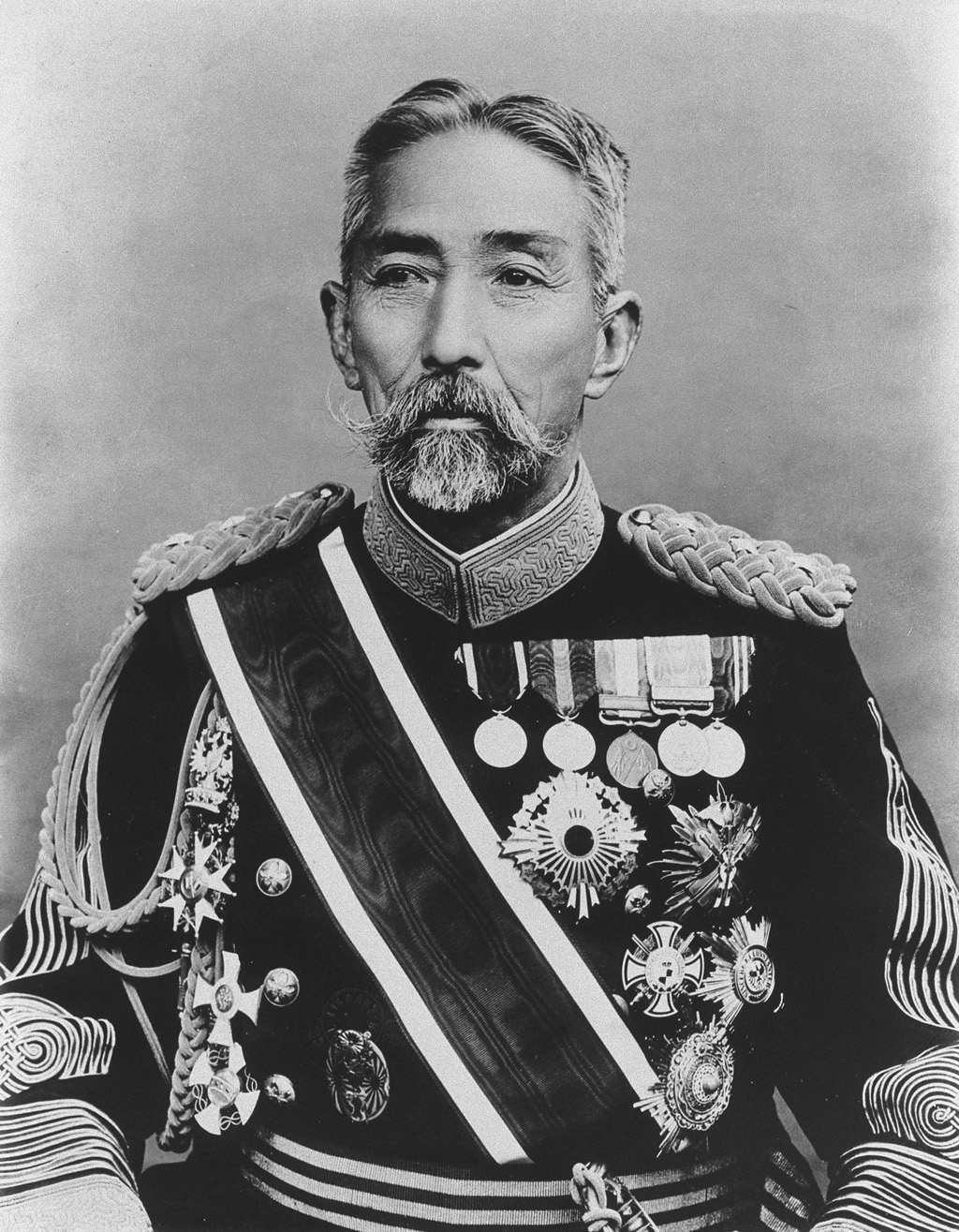
Marquis Nozu Michitsura, a field marshal in the early Imperial Japanese Army. He was appointed as chief of staff of the Imperial Guard (Japan) in 1874.

The conscription ordinance enacted on January 10, 1873, made universal military service compulsory for all male subjects in the country. The law called for a total of seven years of military service: three years in the regular army (jōbigun), two years in the reserve (dai'ichi kōbigun), and an additional two years in the second reserve (daini kōbigun). All able-bodied males between the ages of 17 and 40 were considered members of the national guard (kokumingun), which would only see service in a severe national crisis, such as an attack or invasion of Japan. The conscription examination decided which group of recruits would enter the army, those who failed the exam were excused from all examinations except for the national guard. Recruits who passed entered the draft lottery, where some were selected for active duty. A smaller group would be selected for replacement duty (hojū-eki) should anything happen to any of the active duty soldiers; the rest were dismissed. One of the primary differences between the samurai and the peasant class was the right to bear arms; this ancient privilege was suddenly extended to every male in the nation. There were several exemptions, including criminals, those who could show hardship, the physically unfit, heads of households or heirs, students, government bureaucrats, and teachers. A conscript could also purchase an exemption for ¥270, which was an enormous sum for the time and which restricted this privilege to the wealthy. Under the new 1873 ordinance, the conscript army was composed mainly of second and third sons of impoverished farmers who manned the regional garrisons, while former samurai controlled the Imperial Guard and the Tokyo garrison.

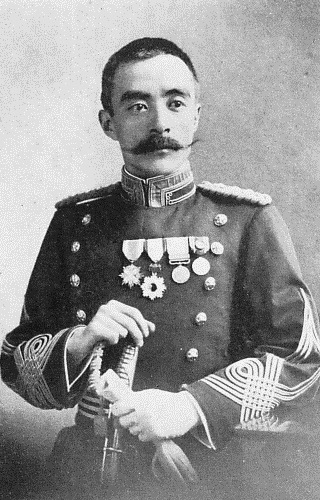
Marquis Jutoku Saigo, a general in the early Imperial Japanese Army and the nephew of Saigō Takamori, the leader of the Satsuma Rebellion of 1877. Many of the rebels were incorporated into the Imperial Army after the failure of the armed uprising.

Initially, because of the army's small size and numerous exemptions, relatively few young men were actually conscripted for a three-year term on active duty. In 1873, the army numbered approximately 17,900 from a population of 35 million at the time; it doubled to about 33,000 in 1875. The conscription program slowly built up the numbers. Public unrest began in 1874, reaching the apex in the Satsuma Rebellion of 1877, which used the slogans, "oppose conscription", "oppose elementary schools", and "fight Korea". It took a year for the new army to crush the uprising, but the victories proved critical in creating and stabilizing the Imperial government and to realize sweeping social, economic and political reforms that enabled Japan to become a modern state that could stand comparison to France, Germany, and other Western European powers.

=== Further development and modernization (1873–1894) ===
==== Foreign assistance ====
The early Imperial Japanese Army was developed with the assistance of advisors from France, through the second French military mission to Japan (1872–1880), and the third French military mission to Japan (1884–1889). However, after France's defeat in 1871 the Japanese government switched to the victorious Germans as a model. From 1886 to April 1890, it hired German military advisors (Major Jakob Meckel, replaced in 1888 by von Wildenbrück and Captain von Blankenbourg) to assist in the training of the Japanese General Staff. In 1878, the Imperial Japanese Army General Staff Office, based on the German General Staff, was established directly under the Emperor and was given broad powers for military planning and strategy.

Other known foreign military consultants were Major Pompeo Grillo from the Kingdom of Italy, who worked at the Osaka foundry from 1884 to 1888, followed by Major Quaratezi from 1889 to 1890; and Captain Schermbeck from the Netherlands, who worked on improving coastal defenses from 1883 to 1886. Japan did not use foreign military advisors between 1890 and 1918, until the French military mission to Japan (1918–1919), headed by Commandant Jacques-Paul Faure, was requested to assist in the development of the Japanese air services.

==== Taiwan Expedition ====
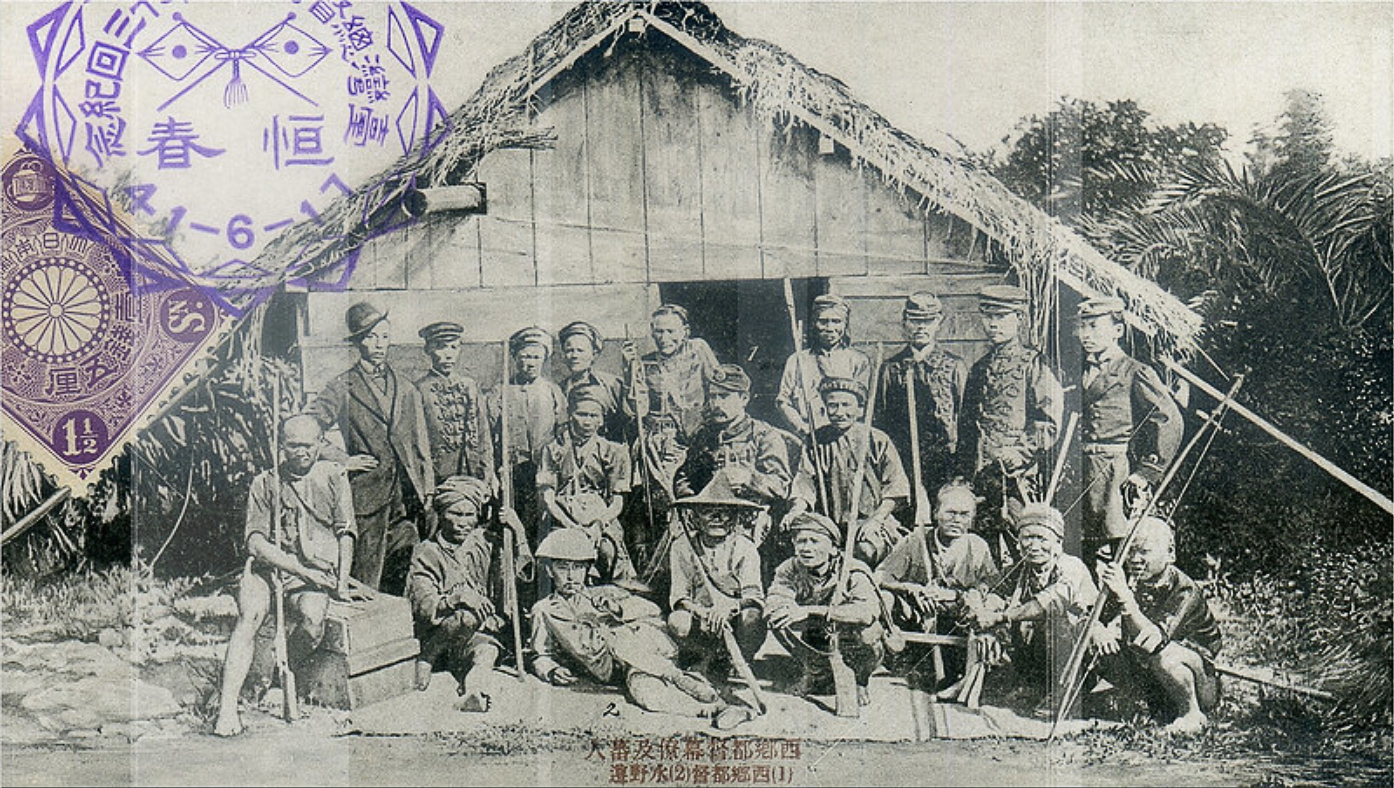
Commander-in-chief Saigō Tsugumichi (sitting at the center) pictured with leaders of the Seqalu tribe

The Japanese invasion of Taiwan under Qing rule in 1874 was a punitive expedition by Japanese military forces in response to the Mudan Incident of December 1871. The Paiwan people, who are indigenous peoples of Taiwan, murdered 54 crewmembers of a wrecked merchant vessel from the Ryukyu Kingdom on the southwestern tip of Taiwan. 12 men were rescued by the local Chinese-speaking community and were transferred to Miyako-jima in the Ryukyu Islands. The Empire of Japan used this as an excuse to both assert sovereignty over the Ryukyu Kingdom, which was a tributary state of both Japan and Qing China at the time, and to attempt the same with Taiwan, a Qing territory. It marked the first overseas deployment of the Imperial Japanese Army and Navy.

An Imperial Rescript to Soldiers and Sailors of 1882 called for unquestioning loyalty to the Emperor by the new armed forces and asserted that commands from superior officers were equivalent to commands from the Emperor himself. Thenceforth, the military existed in an intimate and privileged relationship with the imperial institution.

Top-ranking military leaders were given direct access to the Emperor and the authority to transmit his pronouncements directly to the troops. The sympathetic relationship between conscripts and officers, particularly junior officers who were drawn mostly from the peasantry, tended to draw the military closer to the people. In time, most people came to look more for guidance in national matters more to military than to political leaders.

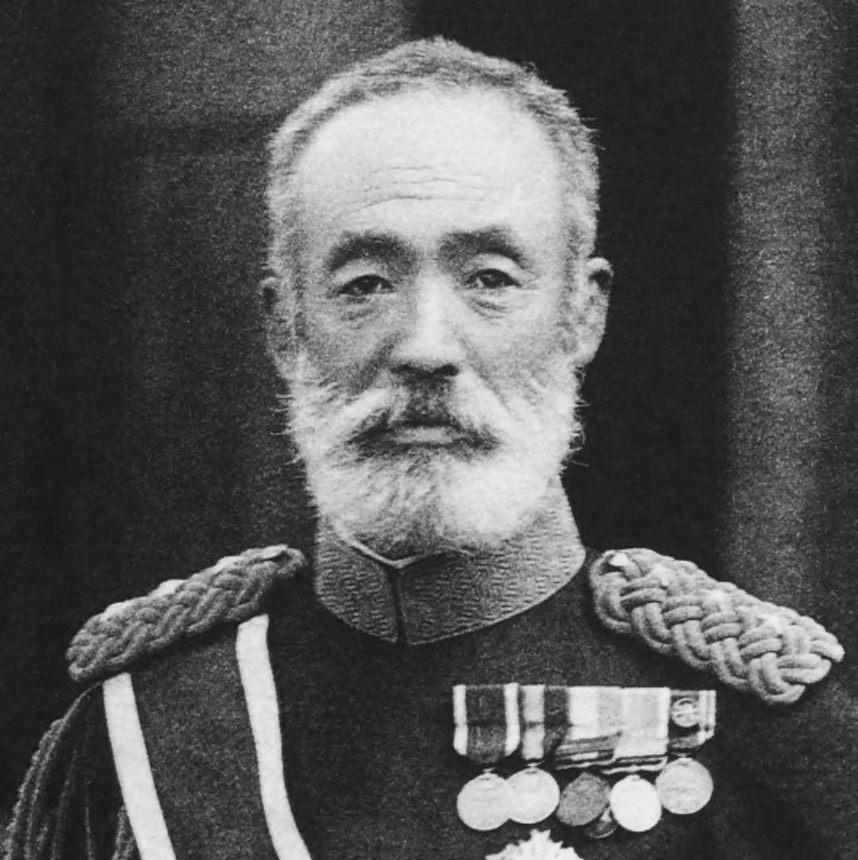
Count Nogi Maresuke, a general in the Imperial Japanese Army and the third governor of Taiwan

By the 1890s, the Imperial Japanese Army had grown to become the most modern army in Asia: well-trained, well-equipped, and with good morale. However, it was basically an infantry force deficient in cavalry and artillery when compared with its European contemporaries. Artillery pieces, which were purchased from America and a variety of European nations, presented two problems: they were scarce, and the relatively small number that were available were of several different calibers, causing problems with ammunition supply.

=== First Sino-Japanese War ===
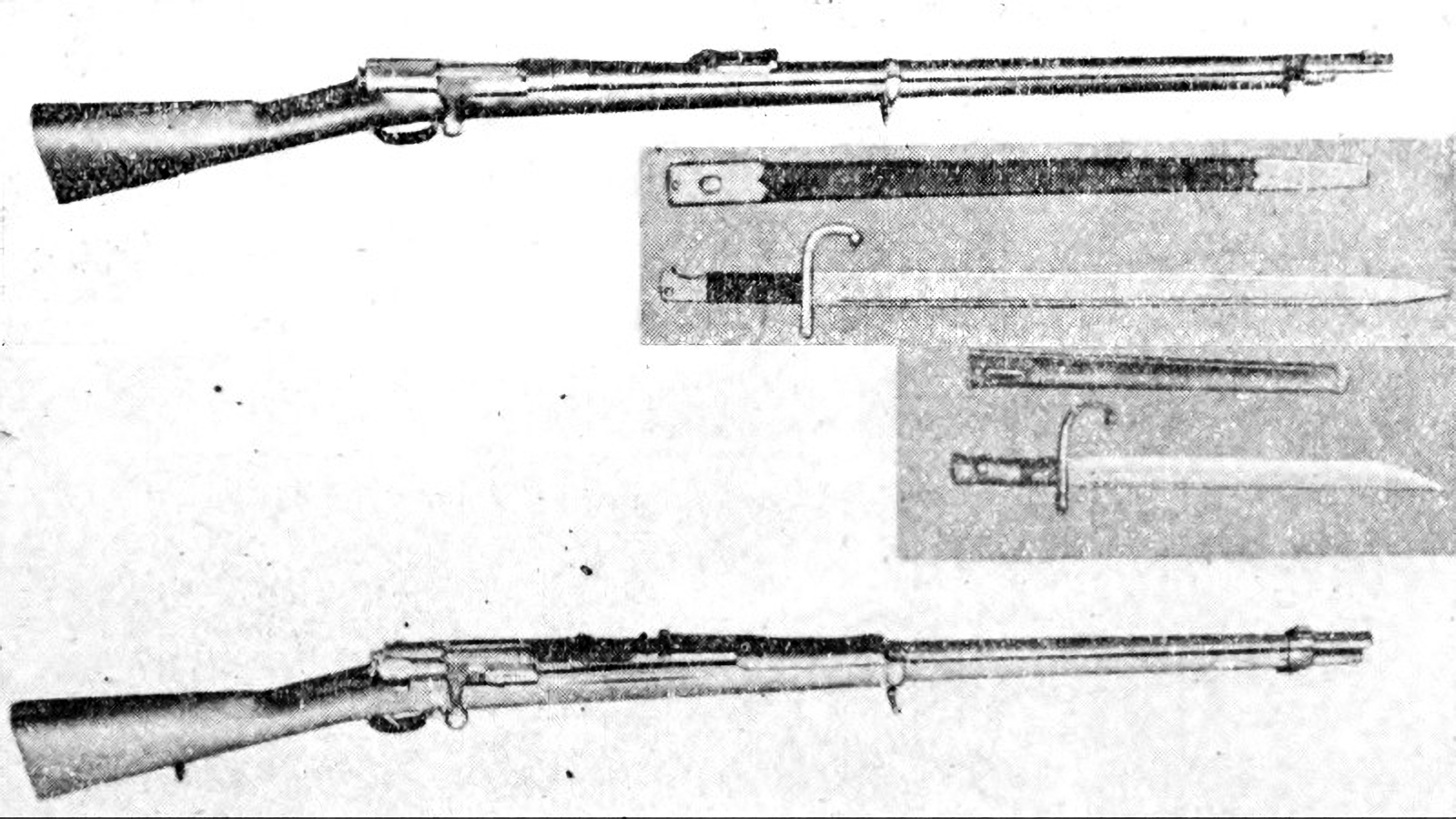
Type 13 (top) and Type 22 (bottom). The Murata rifle is the first locally produced Japanese service rifle that was adopted in 1880.

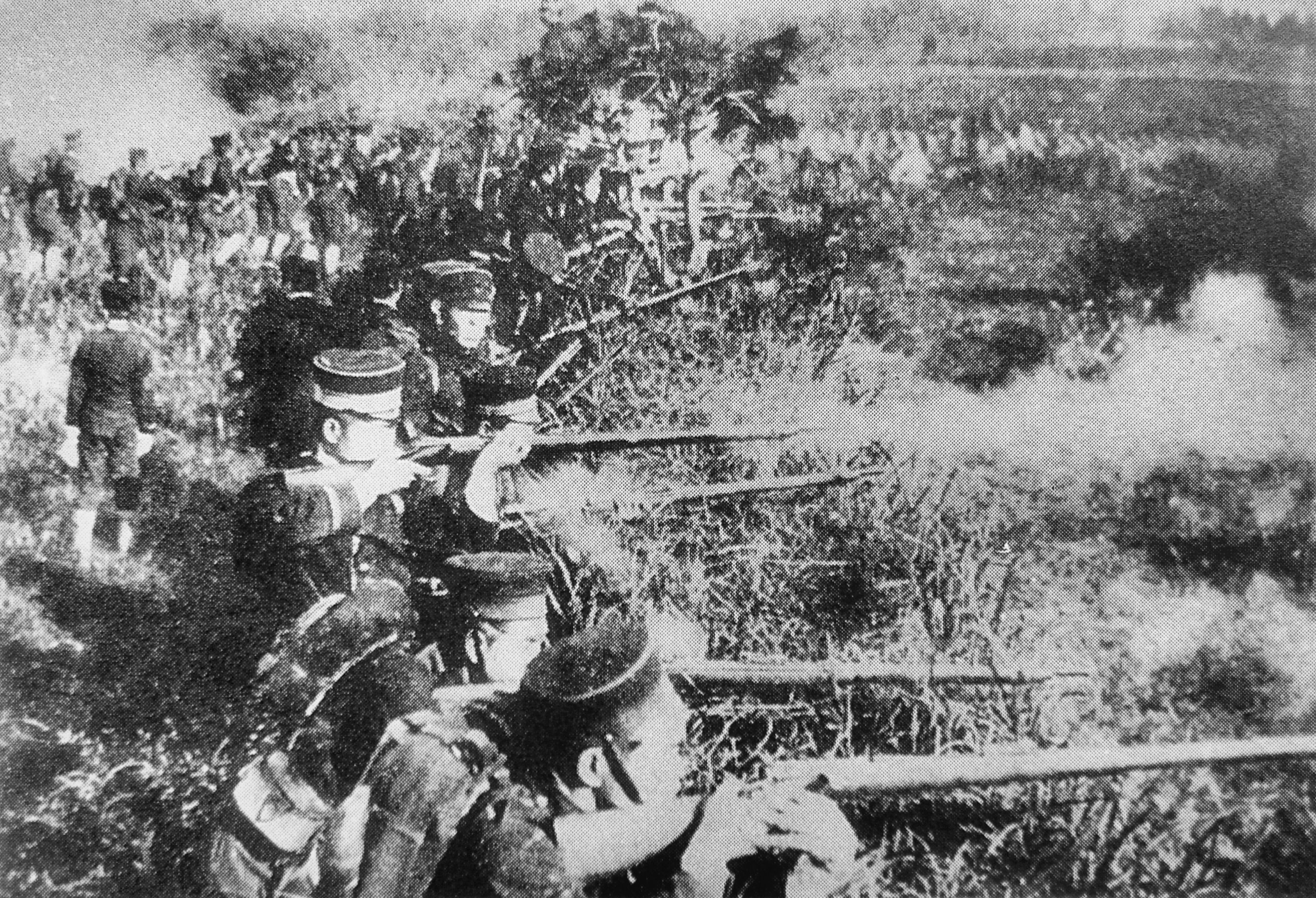
Japanese troops during the First Sino-Japanese War

In the early months of 1894, the Donghak Peasant Revolution broke out in southern Korea and had soon spread throughout the rest of the country, threatening the Korea capital Seoul, itself. The Chinese, since the beginning of May had taken steps to prepare the mobilization of their forces in the provinces of Zhili, Shandong and in Manchuria, as a result of the tense situation on the Korean peninsula. These actions were planned more as an armed demonstration intended to strengthen the Chinese position in Korea, rather than as a preparation for war with Japan. On June 3, the Chinese government accepted the requests from the Korean government to send troops to help quell the rebellion, additionally they also informed the Japanese of the action. It was decided to send 2,500 men to Asan, about 70 km from the capital Seoul. The troops arrived in Asan on June 9 and were additionally reinforced by 400 more on June 25, a total of about 2,900 Chinese soldiers were at Asan.

From the very outset the developments in Korea had been carefully observed in Tokyo. Japanese government had soon become convinced that the Donghak Peasant Revolution would lead to Chinese intervention in Korea. As a result, soon after learning word about the Korean government's request for Chinese military help, immediately ordered all warships in the vicinity to be sent to Pusan and Chemulpo. On June 9, a formation of 420 rikusentai, selected from the crews of the Japanese warships was immediately dispatched to Seoul, where they served temporarily as a counterbalance to the Chinese troops camped at Asan. Simultaneously, the Japanese decided to send a reinforced brigade of approximately 8,000 troops to Korea. The reinforced brigade, included auxiliary units, under the command of General Oshima Yoshimasa was fully transported to Korea by June 27. The Japanese stated to the Chinese that they were willing to withdraw the brigade under General Oshima if the Chinese left Asan prior. However, when on 16 July, 8,000 Chinese troops landed near the entrance of the Taedong River to reinforce Chinese troops garrisoned in Pyongyang, the Japanese delivered Li Hongzhang an ultimatum, threatening to take action if any further troops were sent to Korea. Consequently, General Oshima in Seoul and commanders of the Japanese warships in Korean waters received orders allowing them to initiate military operations if any more Chinese troops were sent to Korea. Despite this ultimatum, Li, considered that Japanese were bluffing and were trying to probe the Chinese readiness to make concessions. He decided, therefore to reinforce Chinese forces in Asan with a further 2,500 troops, 1,300 of which arrived in Asan during the night of July 23–24. At the same time, in the early morning of July 23, the Japanese had taken control of the Royal Palace in Seoul and imprisoned King Gojong, forcing him to renounce ties with China.

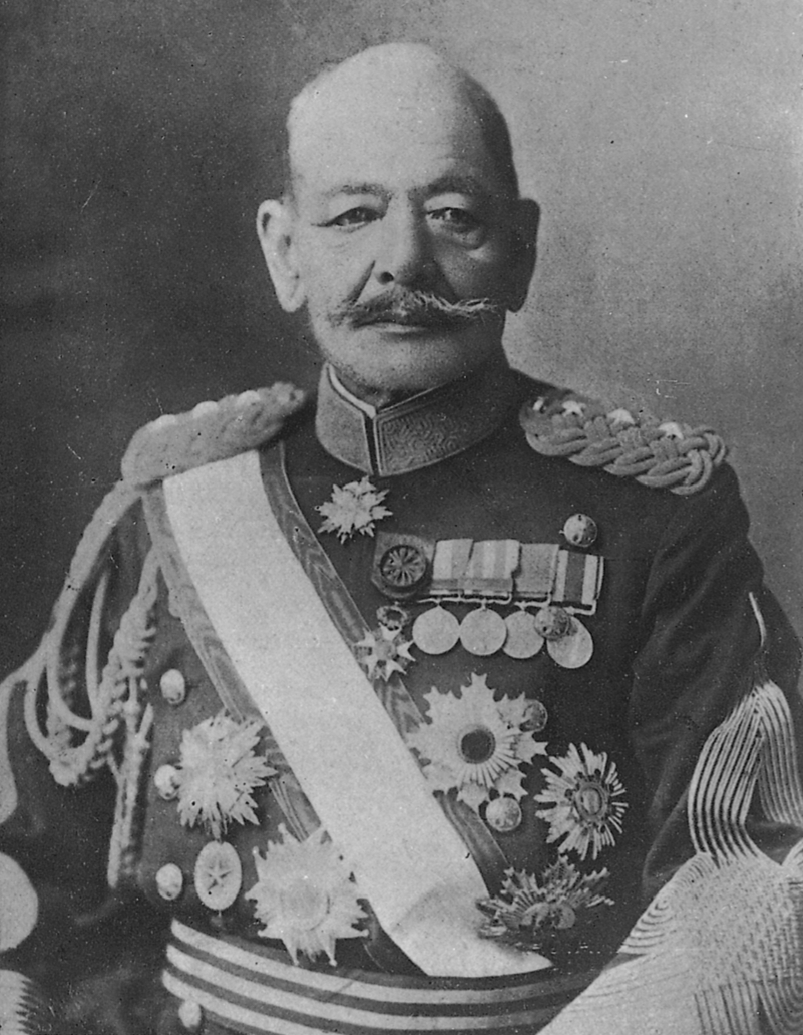
Count Akiyama Yoshifuru, served as a cavalry regimental commander in the First Sino-Japanese War of 1894–1895. In the Russo-Japanese War of 1904–1905, he led his troops against the Cossack cavalry divisions of the Imperial Russian Army.

During the almost two-month interval prior to the declaration of war, the two service staffs developed a two-stage operational plan against China. The army's 5th Division would land at Chemulpo to prevent a Chinese advance in Korea while the navy would engage the Beiyang fleet in a decisive battle in order to secure control of the seas. If the navy defeated the Chinese fleet decisively and secured command of the seas, the larger part of the army would undertake immediate landings on the coast between Shanhaiguan and Tianjin, and advance to the Zhili plain in order to defeat the main Chinese forces and bring the war to a swift conclusion. If neither side gained control of the sea and supremacy, the army would concentrate on the occupation of Korea and exclude Chinese influence there. Lastly, if the navy was defeated and consequently lost command of the sea, Japanese forces in Korea would be ordered to hang on and fight a rearguard action while the bulk of the army would remain in Japan in preparation to repel a Chinese invasion. This worst-case scenario also foresaw attempts to rescue the beleaguered 5th Division in Korea while simultaneously strengthening homeland defenses. The army's contingency plans which were both offensive and defensive, depended on the outcome of the naval operations.

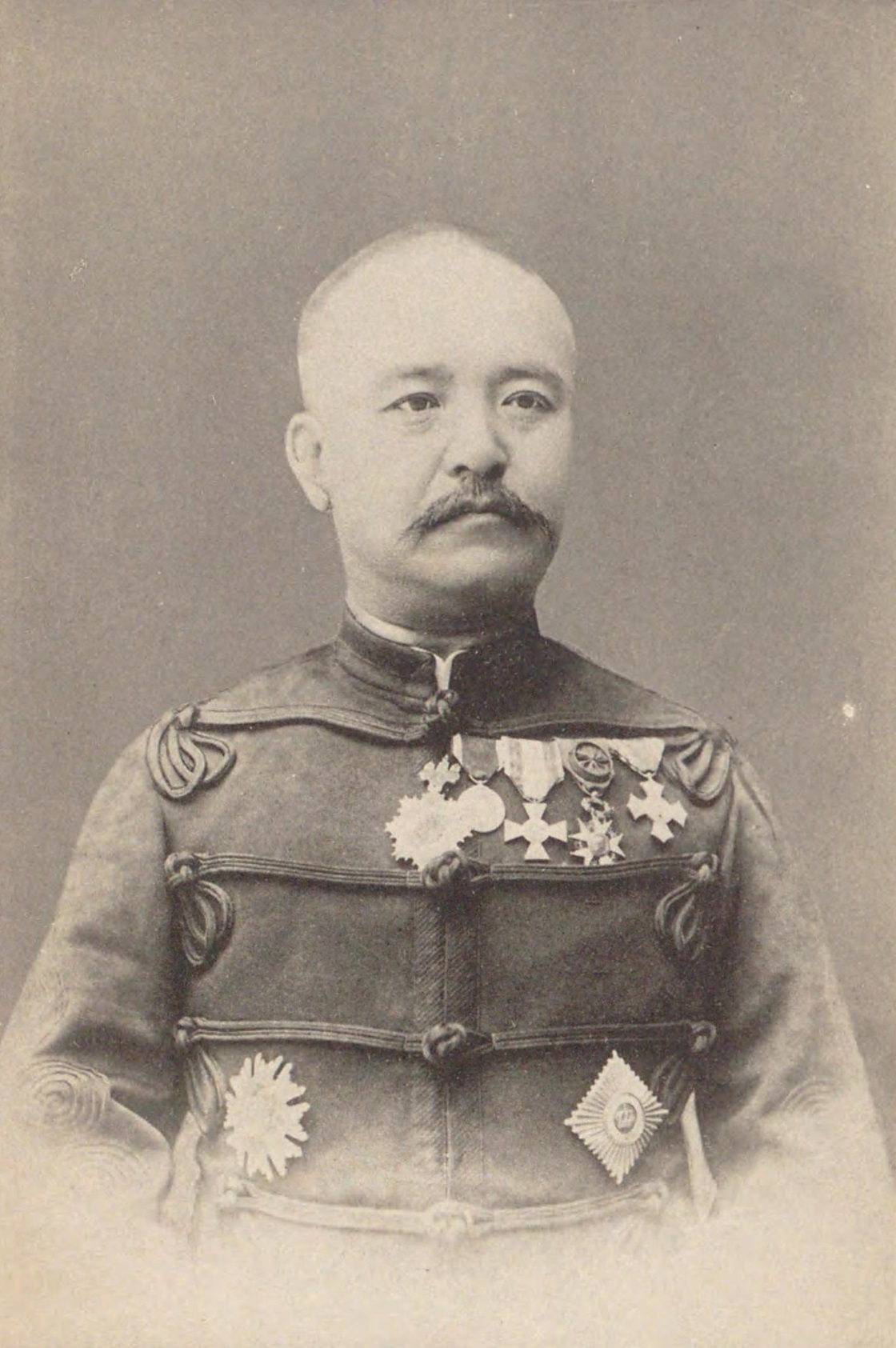
Prince Katsura Tarō, three times Prime Minister of Japan. Katsura was the Vice-Minister of War during the period. He commanded the IJA 3rd Division under his mentor, Field Marshal Yamagata Aritomo, during the First Sino-Japanese War.

Clashes between Chinese and Japanese forces at Pungdo and Seongwhan caused irreversible changes to Sino-Japanese relations and meant that a state of war now existed between the two countries. The two governments officially declared war on August 1. Initially, the general staff's objective was to secure the Korean peninsula before the arrival of winter and then land forces near Shanhaiguan. However, as the navy was unable to bring the Beiyang fleet into battle in mid-August, temporarily withdrew from the Yellow Sea to refit and replenish its ships. As a consequence, in late August the general staff ordered an advance overland to the Zhili plain via Korea in order to capture bases on the Liaodong Peninsula to prevent Chinese forces from interfering with the drive on Beijing. The First Army with two divisions was activated on September 1. In mid-September 17, the Chinese forces defeated at Pyongyang and occupied the city, as the remaining Chinese troops retreated northward. The navy's stunning victory in the Yalu on September 17, was crucial to the Japanese as it allowed the Second Army with three divisions and one brigade to land unopposed on the Liaodong Peninsula about 100 miles north of Port Arthur which controlled the entry to the Bohai Gulf, in mid-October. While, the First Army pursued the remaining Chinese forces from Korea across the Yalu River, Second Army occupied the city of Dairen on November 8 and then seized the fortress and harbor at Port Arthur on November 25. Farther north, the First army's offensive stalled and was beset by supply problems and winter weather.

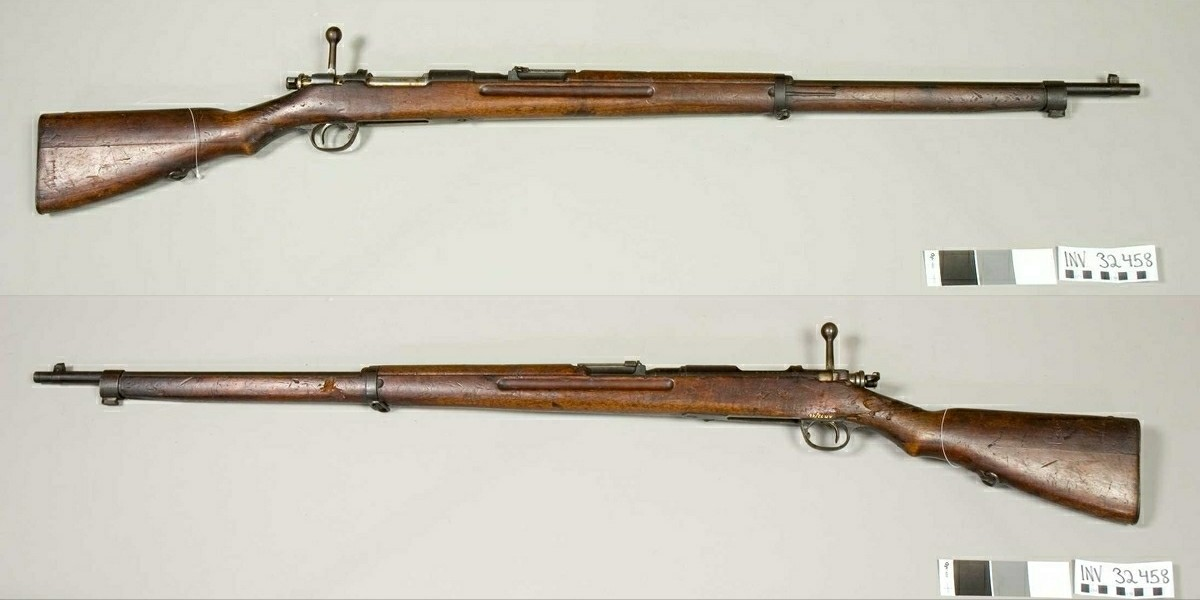
The Type 30 rifle was the standard infantry rifle of the Imperial Japanese Army from 1897 to 1905.

=== Boxer Rebellion ===
In 1899–1900, Boxer attacks against foreigners in China intensified, resulting in the siege of the diplomatic legations in Beijing. An international force consisting of British, French, Russian, German, Italian, Austro-Hungarian, American, and Japanese troops was eventually assembled to relieve the legations. The Japanese provided the largest contingent of troops, 20,840, as well as 18 warships.

A small, hastily assembled, vanguard force of about 2,000 troops, under the command of British Admiral Edward Seymour, departed by rail, from Tianjin, for the legations in early June. On June 12, mixed Boxer and Chinese regular army forces halted the advance, some 30 miles from the capital. The road-bound and badly outnumbered allies withdrew to the vicinity of Tianjin, having suffered more than 300 casualties. The army general staff in Tokyo became aware of the worsening conditions in China and had drafted ambitious contingency plans, but the government, in light of the Triple Intervention refused to deploy large forces unless requested by the western powers. However, three days later, the general staff did dispatch a provisional force of 1,300 troops, commanded by Major General Fukushima Yasumasa, to northern China. Fukushima was chosen because his ability to speak fluent English which enabled him to communicate with the British commander. The force landed near Tianjin on July 5.

On June 17, with tensions increasing, naval Rikusentai from Japanese ships had joined British, Russian, and German sailors to seize the Dagu forts near Tianjin. Four days later, the Qing court declared war on the foreign powers. The British, in light of the precarious situation, were compelled to ask Japan for additional reinforcements, as the Japanese had the only readily available forces in the region. Britain at the time was heavily engaged in the Boer War, and, consequently, a large part of the British army was tied down in South Africa. Deploying large numbers of troops from British garrisons in India would take too much time and weaken internal security there. Overriding personal doubts, Foreign Minister Aoki Shūzō calculated that the advantages of participating in an allied coalition were too attractive to ignore. Prime Minister Yamagata likewise concurred, but others in the cabinet demanded that there be guarantees from the British in return for the risks and costs of a major deployment of Japanese troops. On July 6, the 5th Infantry Division was alerted for possible deployment to China, but without a timetable being set. Two days later, on July 8, with more ground troops urgently needed to lift the siege of the foreign legations at Beijing, the British ambassador offered the Japanese government one million British pounds in exchange for Japanese participation.

Shortly afterward, advance units of the 5th Division departed for China, bringing Japanese strength to 3,800 personnel, of the then-17,000 allied force. The commander of the 5th Division, Lt. General Yamaguchi Motoomi, had taken operational control from Fukushima. A second, stronger allied expeditionary army stormed Tianjin, on July 14, and occupied the city. The allies then consolidated and awaited the remainder of the 5th Division and other coalition reinforcements. In early August, the expedition pushed towards the capital where on August 14, it lifted the Boxer siege. By that time, the 13,000-strong Japanese force was the largest single contingent, making up about 40 percent of the approximately 33,000 strong allied expeditionary force. Japanese troops involved in the fighting had acquitted themselves well, although a British military observer felt their aggressiveness, densely packed formations, and over-willingness to attack cost them excessive casualties. For example, during the Tianjin fighting, the Japanese, while comprising less than one quarter (3,800) of the total allied force of 17,000, suffered more than half of the casualties, 400 out of 730. Similarly at Beijing, the Japanese, constituting slightly less than half of the assault force, accounted for almost two-thirds of the losses, 280 of 453.

=== Russo-Japanese War ===
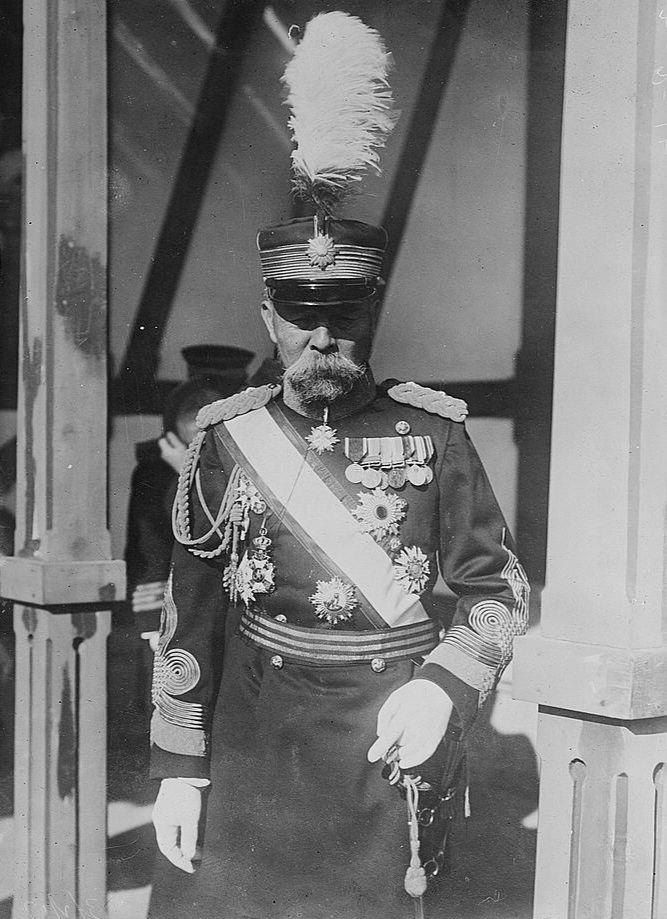
Ōshima Ken'ichi, Minister of War during the period

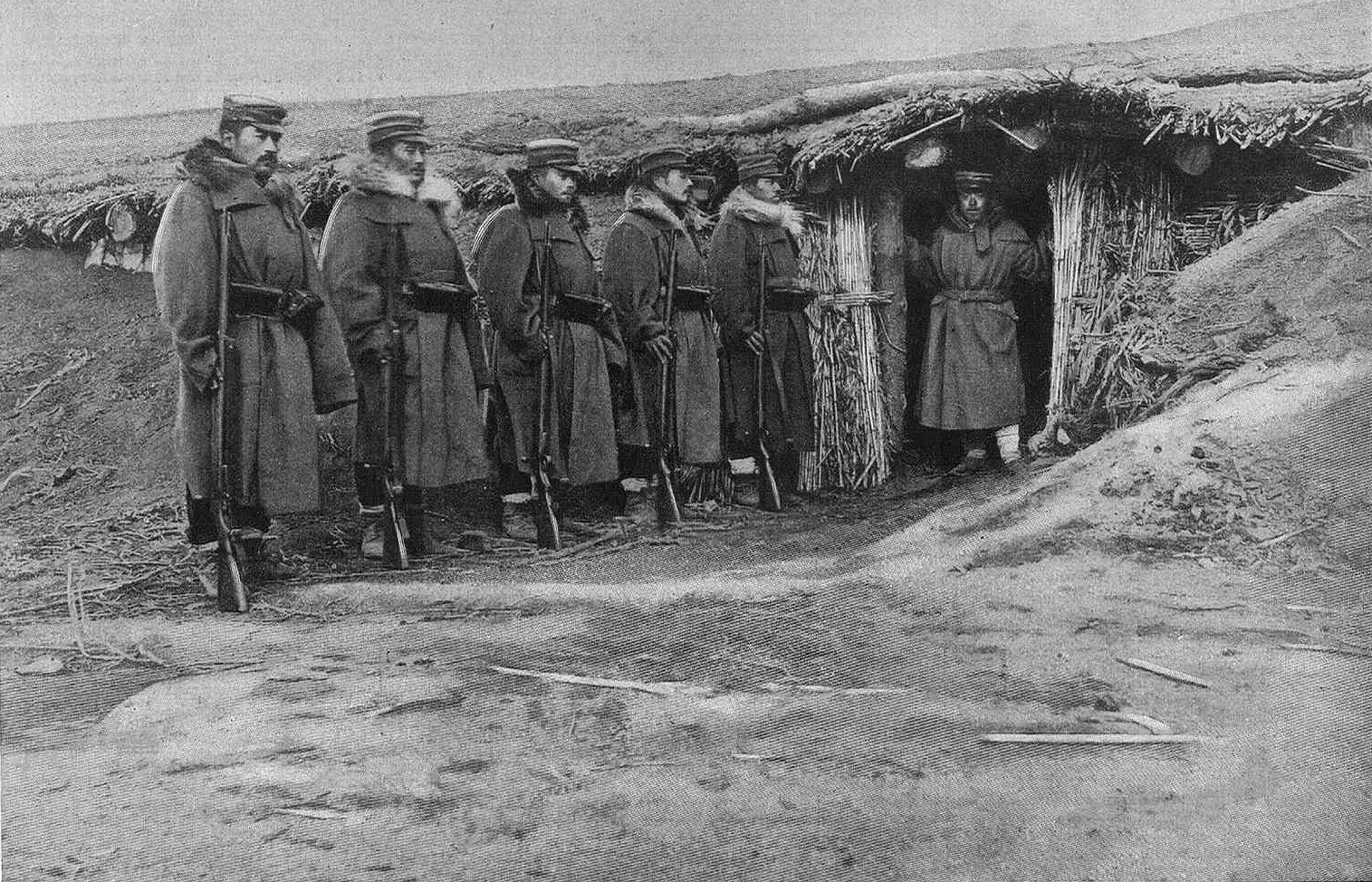
Japanese riflemen during the Russo-Japanese War

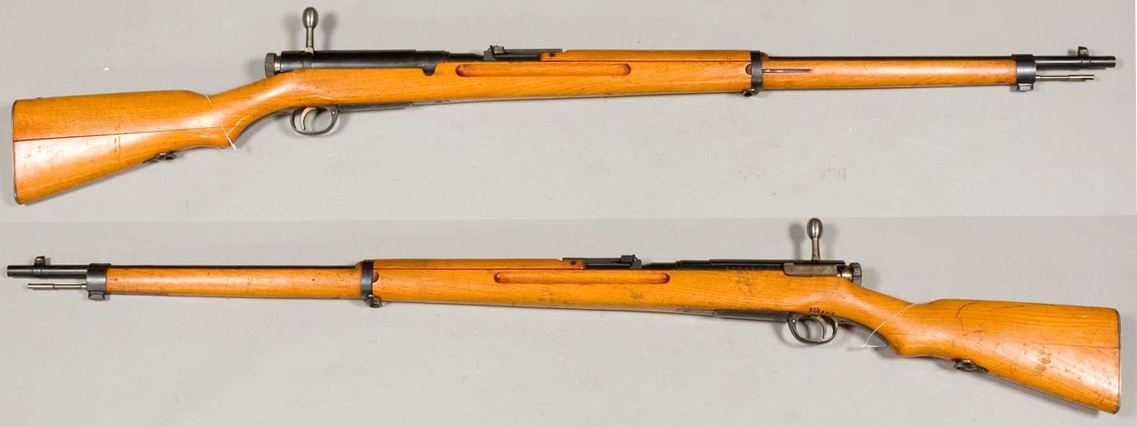
The Type 38 rifle was adopted by the Imperial Japanese Army in 1905.

The Russo–Japanese War (1904–1905) was the result of tensions between Russia and Japan, grown largely out of rival imperialist ambitions toward Manchuria and Korea. The Japanese army inflicted severe losses against the Russians; however, they were not able to deal a decisive blow to the Russian armies. Over-reliance on infantry led to large casualties among Japanese forces, especially during the siege of Port Arthur.

In 1902, the English, who like the Japanese after their war with China, had found themselves isolated owing to European condemnation for waging war on the Boers in South Africa, were only too happy to sign a defensive alliance with Japan. A condition of this treaty was that England would go to war with any country that joined Russia in a war against Japan. To add more weight to Japanese security, the American president, Theodore Roosevelt, gave a firm warning to France and Germany that any further bullying on their part towards Japan would result in America coming out firmly on her side.

Confronted by the proposition of having no allies, and the possibility of incurring the wrath of both America and Britain, the Tsar Nicholas II agreed to a staged withdrawal of his forces from Manchuria. By 1903 however this had been watered down with Russian troops still remaining ostensibly to guard their newly constructed railways, and also by the creation of the Russian Far East Timber Company which saw the potential of lucrative lumber concessions along the borders of Korea and China.

=== World War I ===
The Empire of Japan entered the war on the Entente side. Although tentative plans were made to send an expeditionary force of between 100,000 and 500,000 men to fight in France on the Western Front, ultimately among the few actions in which the Imperial Japanese Army was involved was the careful and well-executed attack on the German concession of Qingdao in 1914 and the seizure of various other small German islands and colonies.

=== Inter-war years ===
==== Siberian intervention ====
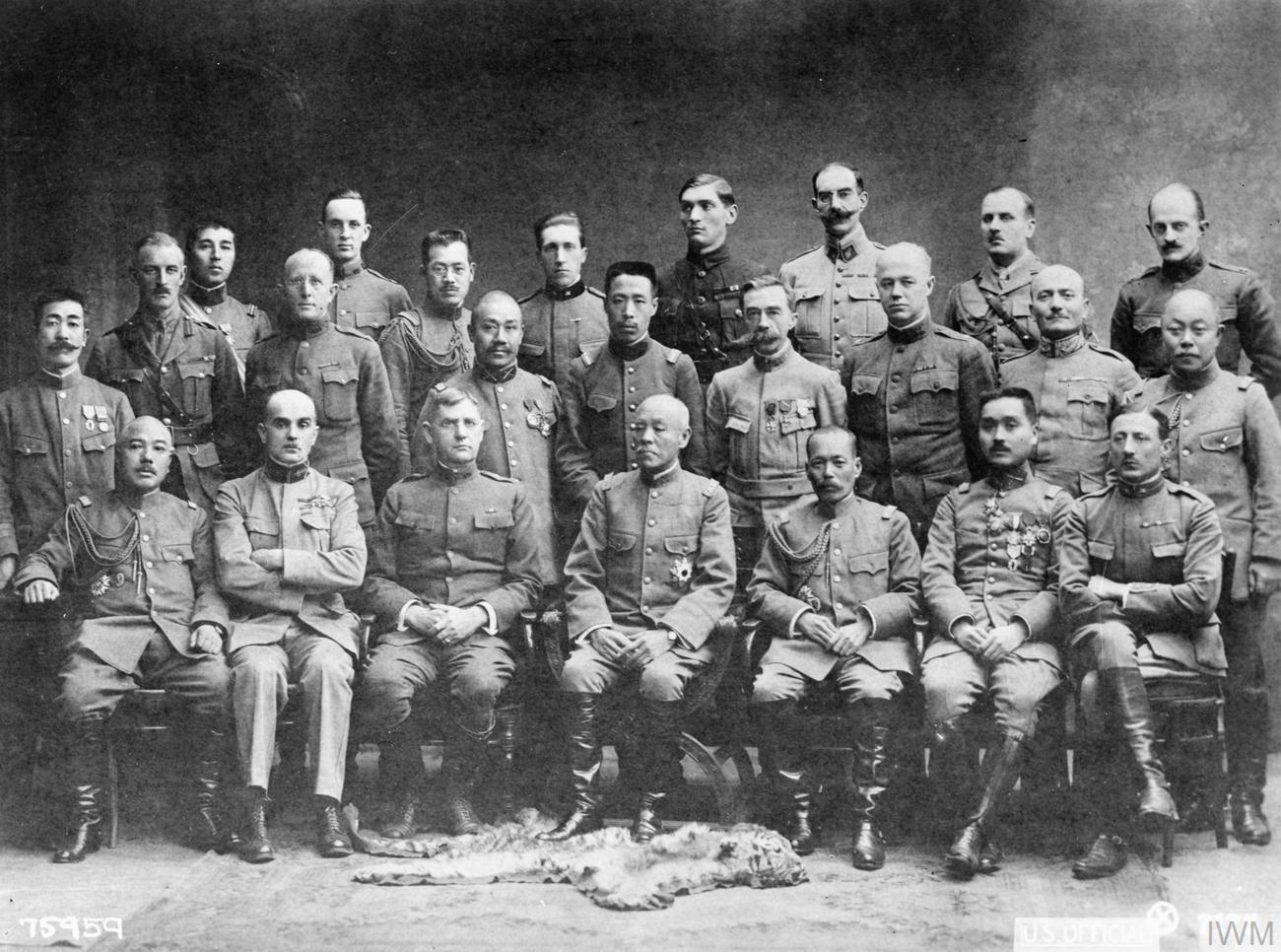
Commanding Officers and Chiefs of Staff of the Allied Military Mission to Siberia, Vladivostok during the Allied Intervention

During 1917–18, Japan continued to extend its influence and privileges in China via the Nishihara Loans. During the Siberian Intervention, following the collapse of the Russian Empire after the Bolshevik Revolution, the Imperial Japanese Army initially planned to send more than 70,000 troops to occupy Siberia as far west as Lake Baikal. The army general staff came to view the Tsarist collapse as an opportunity to free Japan from any future threat from Russia by detaching Siberia and forming an independent buffer state. The plan was scaled back considerably due to opposition from the United States.

In July 1918, the U.S. President, Woodrow Wilson, asked the Japanese government to supply 7,000 troops as part of an international coalition of 24,000 troops to support the American Expeditionary Force Siberia. After a heated debate in the Diet, the government of Prime Minister Terauchi Masatake agreed to send 12,000 troops, but under the command of Japan, rather than as part of an international coalition. Japan and the United States sent forces to Siberia to bolster the armies of the White movement leader Admiral Aleksandr Kolchak against the Bolshevik Red Army.

Once the political decision had been reached, the Imperial Japanese Army took over full control under Chief of Staff General Yui Mitsue; and by November 1918, more than 70,000 Japanese troops had occupied all ports and major towns in the Russian Maritime Provinces and eastern Siberia.

In June 1920, the United States and its allied coalition partners withdrew from Vladivostok, after the capture and execution of the White Army leader, Admiral Kolchak, by the Red Army. However, the Japanese decided to stay, primarily due to fears of the spread of communism so close to Japan and Japanese-controlled Korea. The Japanese Army provided military support to the Japanese-backed Provisional Priamurye Government, based in Vladivostok, against the Moscow-backed Far Eastern Republic.

The continued Japanese presence concerned the United States, which suspected that Japan had territorial designs on Siberia and the Russian Far East. Subjected to intense diplomatic pressure by the United States and Great Britain, and facing increasing domestic opposition due to the economic and human cost, the administration of Prime Minister Katō Tomosaburō withdrew the Japanese forces in October 1922.

==== Rise of militarism ====
In the 1920s the Imperial Japanese Army expanded rapidly and by 1927 had a force of 300,000 men. Unlike western countries, the Army enjoyed a great deal of independence from government. Under the provisions of the Meiji Constitution, the War Minister was held accountable only to the Emperor (Hirohito) himself, and not to the elected civilian government. In fact, Japanese civilian administrations needed the support of the Army in order to survive. The Army controlled the appointment of the War Minister, and in 1936 a law was passed that stipulated that only an active duty general or lieutenant-general could hold the post. As a result, military spending as a proportion of the national budget rose disproportionately in the 1920s and 1930s, and various factions within the military exerted disproportionate influence on Japanese foreign policy.

The Imperial Japanese Army was originally known simply as the Army (rikugun) but after 1928, as part of the Army's turn toward romantic nationalism and also in the service of its political ambitions, it re-titled itself the Imperial Army (kōgun).

In 1923, the army consisted of 21 divisions, but in accordance with the 1924 reform it was reduced to 17 divisions. Two leaps in the development of the military industry (1906–1910 and 1931–1934) made it possible to re-equip the armed forces.

=== Second Sino-Japanese War ===
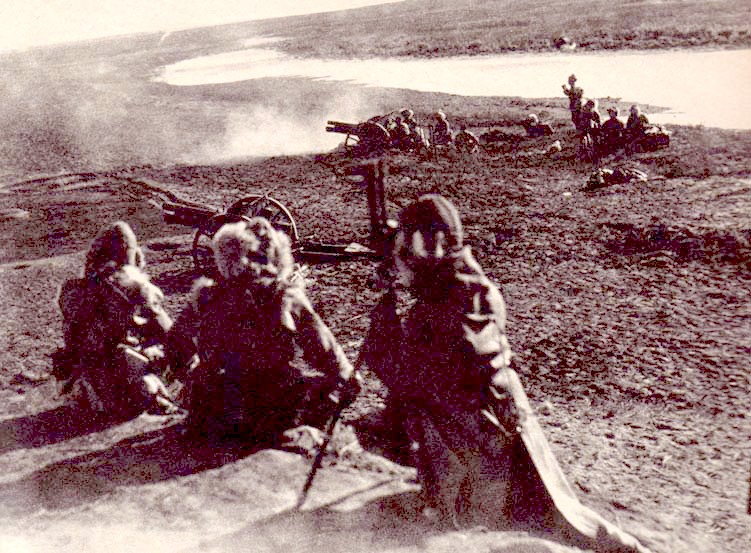
IJA artillery in Manchuria during the Jinzhou Operation, 1931

In 1931, the Imperial Japanese Army had an overall strength of 198,880 officers and men, organized into 17 divisions. The Manchurian incident, as it became known in Japan, was a pretended sabotage of a local Japanese-owned railway, an attack staged by Japan but blamed on Chinese dissidents. Action by the military, largely independent of the civilian leadership, led to the invasion of Manchuria in 1931 and, later, to the Second Sino-Japanese War, in 1937. As war approached, the Imperial Army's influence with the Emperor waned and the influence of the Imperial Japanese Navy increased. Nevertheless, by 1938 the Army had been expanded to 34 divisions.

=== Conflict with the Soviet Union ===
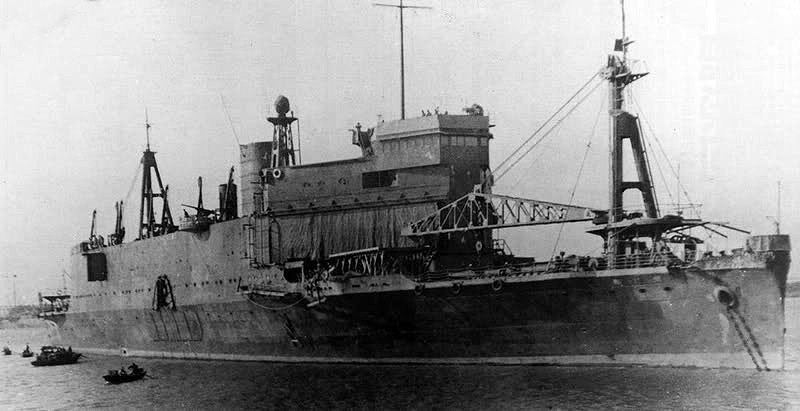
IJA amphibious assault ship Shinshū Maru, the world's first landing craft carrier ship to be designed as such

From 1932 to 1945 the Empire of Japan and the Soviet Union had a series of border conflicts. Japan had set its military sights on Soviet territory as a result of the Hokushin-ron doctrine, and the Japanese establishment of a puppet state in Manchuria brought the two countries into conflict. The war lasted on and off with the last battles of the 1930s (the Battle of Lake Khasan and the Battles of Khalkhin Gol) ending in a decisive victory for the Soviets. The conflicts stopped with the signing of the Soviet–Japanese Neutrality Pact on April 13, 1941. However, later, at the Yalta Conference, Stalin agreed to declare war on Japan; and on August 5, 1945, the Soviet Union voided their neutrality agreement with Japan.

=== World War II ===
Army uniforms between 1941 and 1945 (US Army poster)

In 1941, the Imperial Japanese Army had 51 divisions and various special-purpose artillery, cavalry, anti-aircraft, and armored units with a total of 1,700,000 people. At the beginning of the Second World War, most of the Japanese Army (27 divisions) was stationed in China. A further 13 divisions defended the Mongolian border, due to concerns about a possible attack by the Soviet Union. From 1942, soldiers were sent to Hong Kong (23rd Army), the Philippines (14th Army), Thailand (15th Army), Burma (15th Army), Dutch East Indies (16th Army), and Malaya (25th Army). By 1945, there were 6 million soldiers in the Imperial Japanese Army.

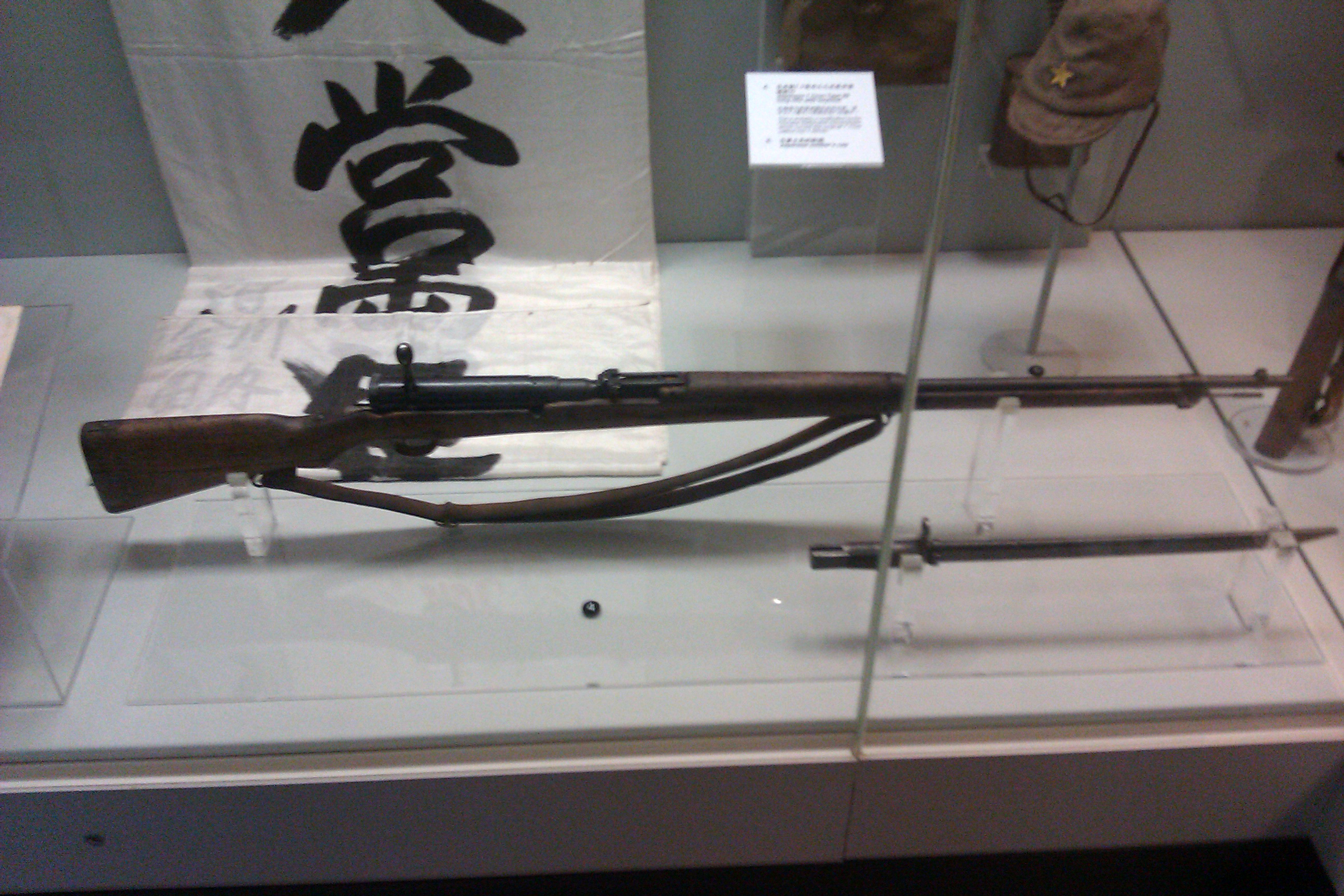
Type 38 rifle

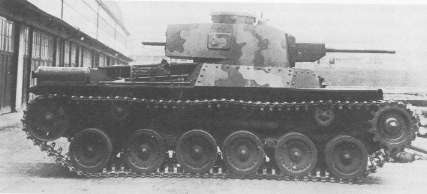
Type 97 Chi-Ha, the most widely produced Japanese medium tank of World War II

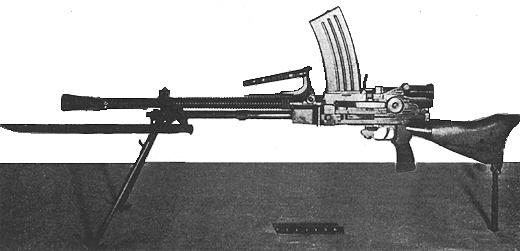
Type 99 light machine gun

From 1943, Japanese troops suffered from a shortage of supplies, especially food, medicine, munitions, and armaments, largely due to submarine interdiction of supplies, and losses to Japanese shipping, which was worsened by a longstanding rivalry with the Imperial Japanese Navy. The lack of supplies caused large numbers of fighter aircraft to become unserviceable for lack of spare parts, and "as many as two-thirds of Japan's total military deaths [to result] from illness or starvation".

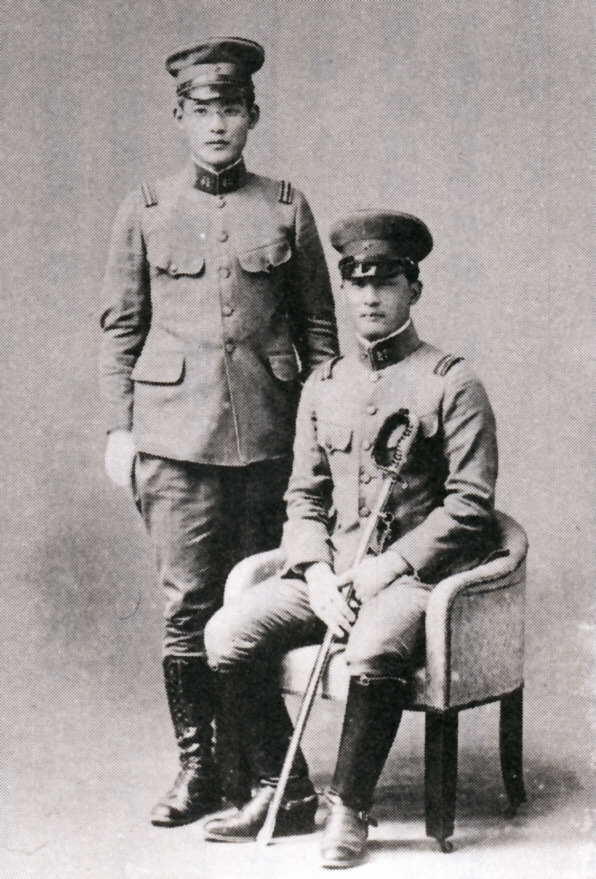
IJA Japanese officers, 1930s

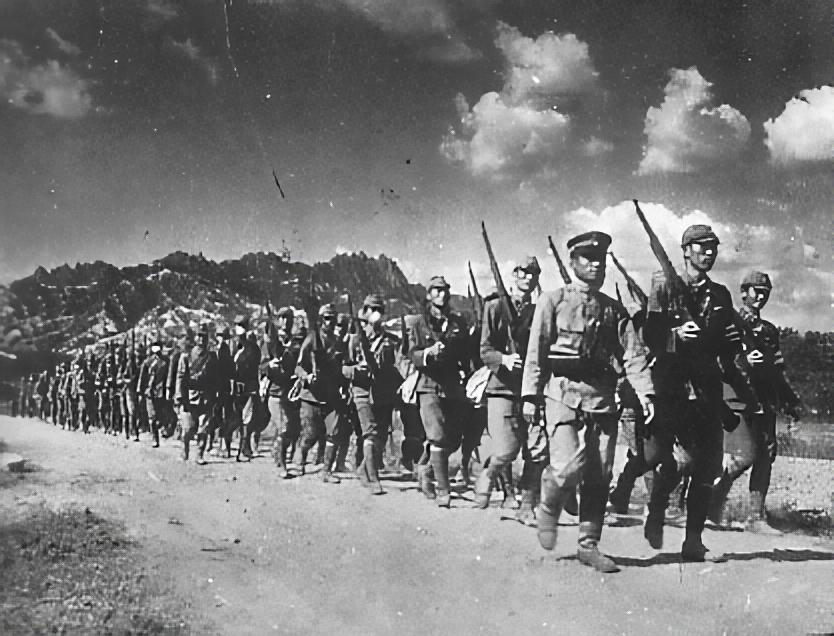
IJA Korean Volunteer army, 1943

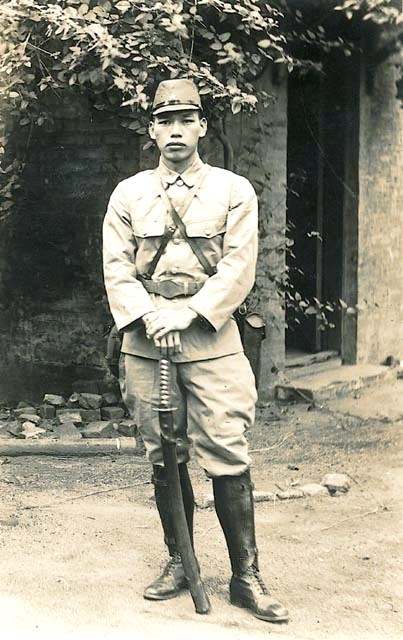
IJA Taiwanese soldier in the Philippines during World War II

==== Salary ====
Compared to respective armies in Europe or America, soldiers in the Imperial Japanese Army received a rather meagre salary; however, the cost of living in Japan was also cheaper than in most Western nations. The below table gives figures from December 1941, when one Japanese yen was worth approximately $0.23.

Basic rates of pay
Rank	Monthly salary (yen)	Monthly salary (USD)
General	¥550	$126.50
Lieutenant general	¥483.33	$111.17
Major general	¥416.66	$95.83
Colonel	¥310–370	$71.30–85.10
Lieutenant colonel	¥220–310	$50.60–71.30
Major	¥170–220	$39.10–50.60
Captain	¥122–155	$28.06–35.65
First lieutenant	¥85–94.16	$19.55–21.66
Warrant officer	¥80–110	$18.40–25.30
Second lieutenant	¥70.83	$16.30
Sergeant major	¥32–75	$7.36–17.25
Officer Cadet	¥25–40	$5.75–9.20
Sergeant	¥23–30	$5.29–6.90
Corporal	¥20	$4.60
Lance corporal	¥13.50	$3.11
Private first class	¥9	$2.07

For comparison, in 1942, an American private was paid approximately $50 per month (or 204 yen), meaning the lowest ranking soldier in the United States military was earning equivalent to the maximum salary of an Imperial Japanese major, or the base salary of an Imperial Japanese lieutenant colonel, and about 25 times as much as an Imperial Japanese soldier of the same rank. While disproportionate salary ranges were not uncommon between militaries during World War II, for example Australian enlistees could expect to receive roughly triple as much in pay as their counterparts fighting for the United Kingdom, by any standards, despite being widely considered a "first rate" or professional fighting force, men serving in the IJA were very poorly compensated.

Complicating matters further was that, by 1942, most Japanese soldiers were paid using the Japanese military yen (JMY), an unsupported currency that could not be redeemed for the regular Japanese yen. In territories under Japanese occupation, the military yen – or "Japanese invasion money", as it came to be known by the locals – was the only legal tender in circulation. The Japanese authorities seized or ordered surrendered all other bank notes in territories under their occupation and provided compensation at an "exchange rate" as they saw fit, in the form of JMYs. This had the effect of affording Japanese soldiers in many occupied territories a higher degree of return for their low pay than they otherwise would have received. However, at the end of the war, the Imperial Japanese ministry of finance cancelled all military bank notes, rendering the military yen worthless.

==== War crimes ====
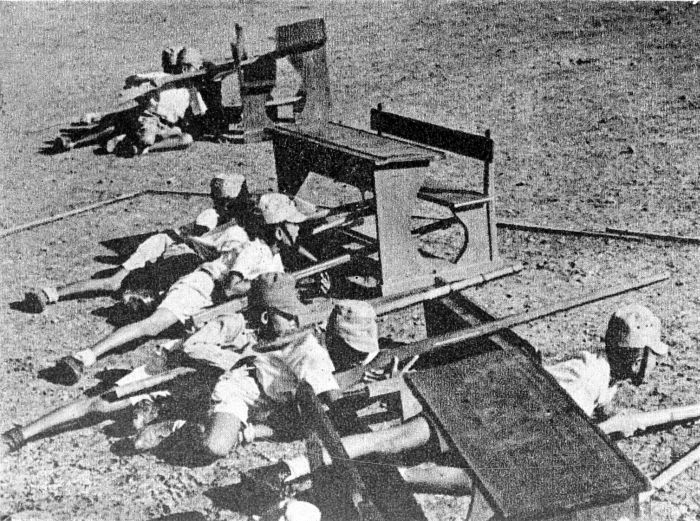
Indonesian youth during military training by Japanese officers, c. 1945

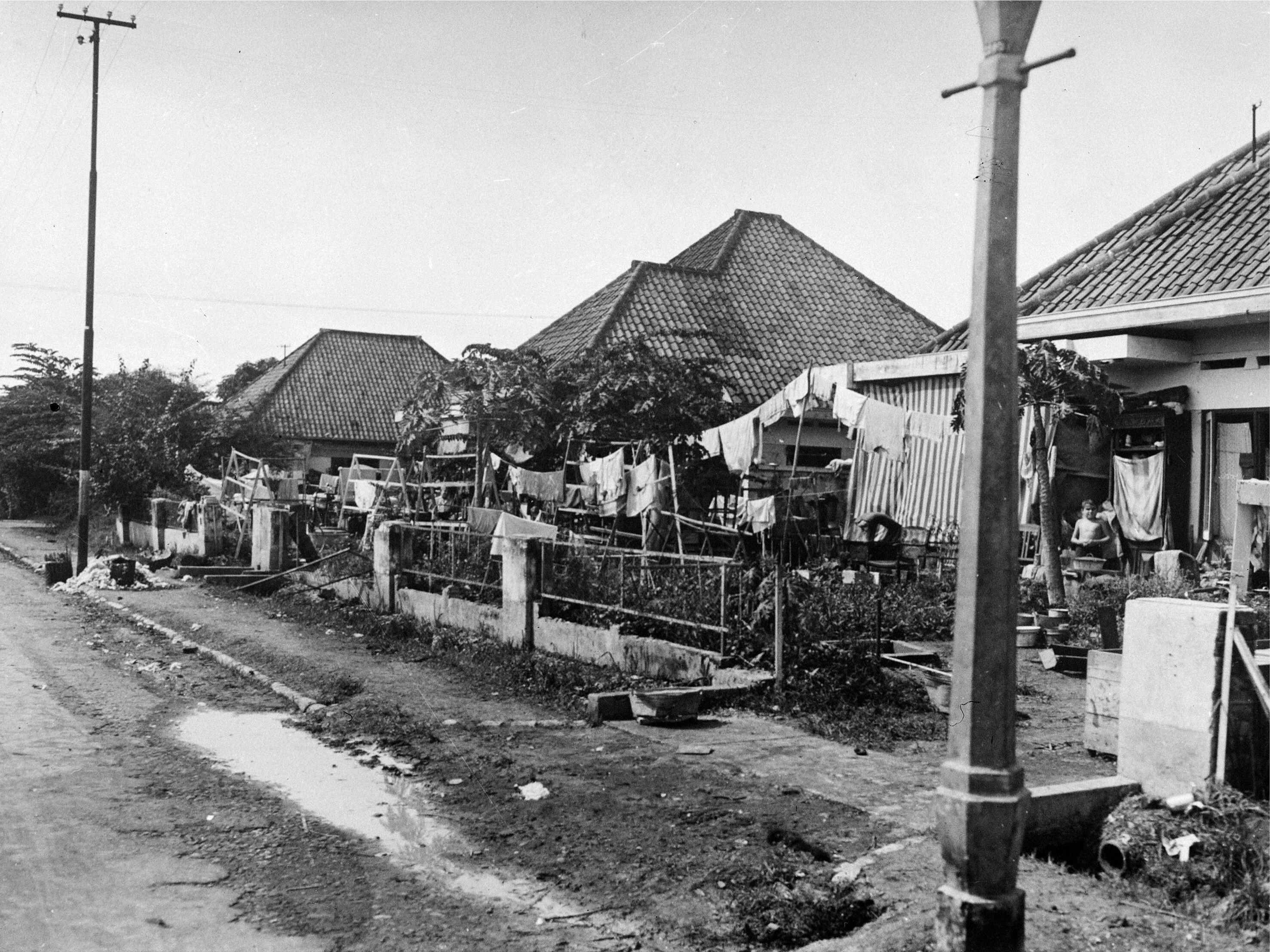
Many thousands of Indonesians were taken away as forced labourers (romusha) for Japanese military projects, including the Burma-Siam and Saketi-Bayah railways, and suffered or died as a result of ill-treatment and starvation. Pictured is an internment camp in Jakarta, c. 1945.

Throughout the Second Sino-Japanese War and World War II, the Imperial Japanese Army had shown immense brutality and engaged in numerous atrocities against civilians, as well as prisoners of war – with the Nanjing Massacre being the most well known example. Other war crimes committed by the Imperial Japanese Army included rape and forced prostitution, death marches, using biological warfare against civilians, and the execution of prisoners of war. Such atrocities throughout the war caused tens of millions of deaths.

==== Mass starvation from "war malnutrition" in China ====
Japanese historian Akira Fujiwara claims that of the 450,000 Japanese troops who died in the Chinese battlefield, approximately half died from non-combat causes. Regarding the general ratio of combat to non-combat losses of the Japanese Army in Operation Ichi-Go, Akira Fujiwara referred to the operational logbook of the 3rd Infantry Regiment of the 27th Division which recorded a total of 1,647 deaths from the start of Operation Ichi-Go to the end of the war. Among them, 509 or 31% were killed in action, 84 or 5% died of wounds, 1,038 or 63% died of illnesses contracted from the battlefield, and 16 or 1% died from other causes. The number of deaths from illnesses was two times the number of combat deaths. Despite his best efforts as a company commander at the time to keep deaths from illnesses to a minimum, Akira Fujiwara’s 3rd Company lost 36 troops killed in action, 6 died of wounds, and 35 died of illnesses. Due to supply disruptions and deteriorating provisions, widespread malnutrition occurred among the Japanese Army, resulting in many soldiers dying from battlefield illnesses, or more specifically, deaths from starvation. Japanese military doctors were hesitant to report malnutrition deaths as such out of considerations for the deceased's families, but most deaths from illnesses recorded were malnutrition-related deaths. Food and medicine for the wounded and sick were scarce in hospitals, resulting in many wounded soldiers of the 27th Division to prefer staying with their units.

==== Repatriating dead remains ====
Japanese continued to fear Muslim Moros so much they could not collect remains of dead Japanese on Jolo island from the Battle of Sulu (スールー諸島の戦い) for decades after the war out of sheer terror. According to an article on 18 February 1958 in Mainichi Shimbun, Japanese officers on a ship called Ginga Maru tried to collect remains of Japanese soldiers on Jolo after the war, but they saw plumes of white smoke on the island as they docked and refused to step foot on the island, fearing another Moro attack against them.

A blurb commntary sourced to the Japanese Ministry of Health and Welfare Relief Bureau on the paperback edition of Japanese 55th Independent Mixed Brigade artillery unit veteran Fujioka Akiyoshi's memoir "Record of Defeat - A Record of the Battlefield of Jolo Island" confirms the Japanese could not collect remains of Japanese soldiers out of fear of Moros: "The first attempt to collect remains took place from January to February 1956, eleven years after the end of the war, but the collection team was put in danger and not a single set of remains could be recovered. Subsequently, 50 sets of remains were recovered in 1968, 1,430 the following year, and 450 in 1974, but no such collections were carried out in hilly or mountainous areas, and 'there are no plans for such collections in the immediate future' (Ministry of Health and Welfare Relief Bureau)."

55th Independent Mixed Brigade artillery unit veteran Tatsuzo Okumura wrote another book called "Jolo island war chronicles" about the battle. Okumura heard about Fujioka's surrender himself during the battle. Okumura admitted in his book that the Japanese were invaders fighting against indigenous population and that the Muslim Moros fought against all colonial invaders of their land, including Japan, United States and Spain and talked about how the Moros struck terror into the Japanese. In the preface of the book, Tatsuzo Okumura said he hallucinated seeing his dead Japanese comrades begging to come with him when he and the surviving Japanese POWs from Jolo were being sent to a camp on Mindanao: "At that moment [when being transported from Jolo Island to a POW camp on Mindanao], I saw the figures of my comrades on the receding beach of Jolo Island. I saw them—those who had wasted away and died in the jungle—crowding the shore and calling out at the top of their lungs: 'Hey! Are you leaving? Take us with you!'"

==== Starvation ====
A Japanese second lieutenant Yasuo Obi wrote a memoir called Ningen no Genkai (human limits) about how his comrades starved to death during the Battle of Guadalcanal, nicknamed "starvation island", with them measuring how much time each had to live based on whether they could still talk, sit or stand. Japanese soldiers were urged to "bite the bullet spirit" and sent without any food supplies and told to find food themselves. Many Japanese soldiers starved to death during the Battle of Imphal and "not a grain of rice" was received by them from the IJA command, with an angry Japanese division commander fleeing due to a lack of food. The retreat path was called skeleton highway (hakkotsu kaido) because of how many Japanese soldiers died of starvation. A book called "Uejini shita eireitachi" (Japanese soldiers who died of starvation) was written by Akira Fujiwara about the mass starvations.

==== Destroyed classified documents ====
Japan Center for Asian Historical Records (JACAR) revealed that the Japanese ministry of the Army Secretariat adjutant-general, Colonel Miyama Yōzō admitted that the Japanese Ministry of the Army ordered the Japanese army to mass incinerate classified documents in the day they issued the surrender order, mass destroying countless documents to stop the enemy Allied forces from obtaining them, and then the incineration order itself, Army Classified Telegram No. 69 (Directive on Incineration of Army Classified Documents) was subsequently hidden. The Japanese army was already ordered during the war as standard procedure to carry celluloid and gasoline to get ready to burn documents to stop them from reaching enemy hands. Documents were torched before the surrender.

=== Post–World War II ===
==== Ground Self-Defense Force ====
Article 9 of the Japanese Constitution renounced the right to use force as a means of resolving disputes. This was enacted by the Japanese in order to prevent militarism, which had led to conflict. However, in 1947 the Public Security Force was formed; later in 1954, in the early stages of the Cold War, the Public Security Force formed the basis of the newly created Ground Self-Defense Force. Although significantly smaller than the former Imperial Japanese Army and nominally for defensive purposes only, this force constitutes the modern army of Japan.

==== Continued resistance ====
Separately, some soldiers of the Imperial Japanese Army continued to fight on isolated Pacific islands until at least the 1970s, with the last known Japanese soldier surrendering in 1974. Intelligence officer Hiroo Onoda, who surrendered on Lubang Island in the Philippines in March 1974, and Teruo Nakamura, who surrendered on the Indonesian island of Morotai in December 1974, appear to have been the last holdouts but there are reports of other Japanese holdout later than December 1974.

== Growth and organization of the IJA ==
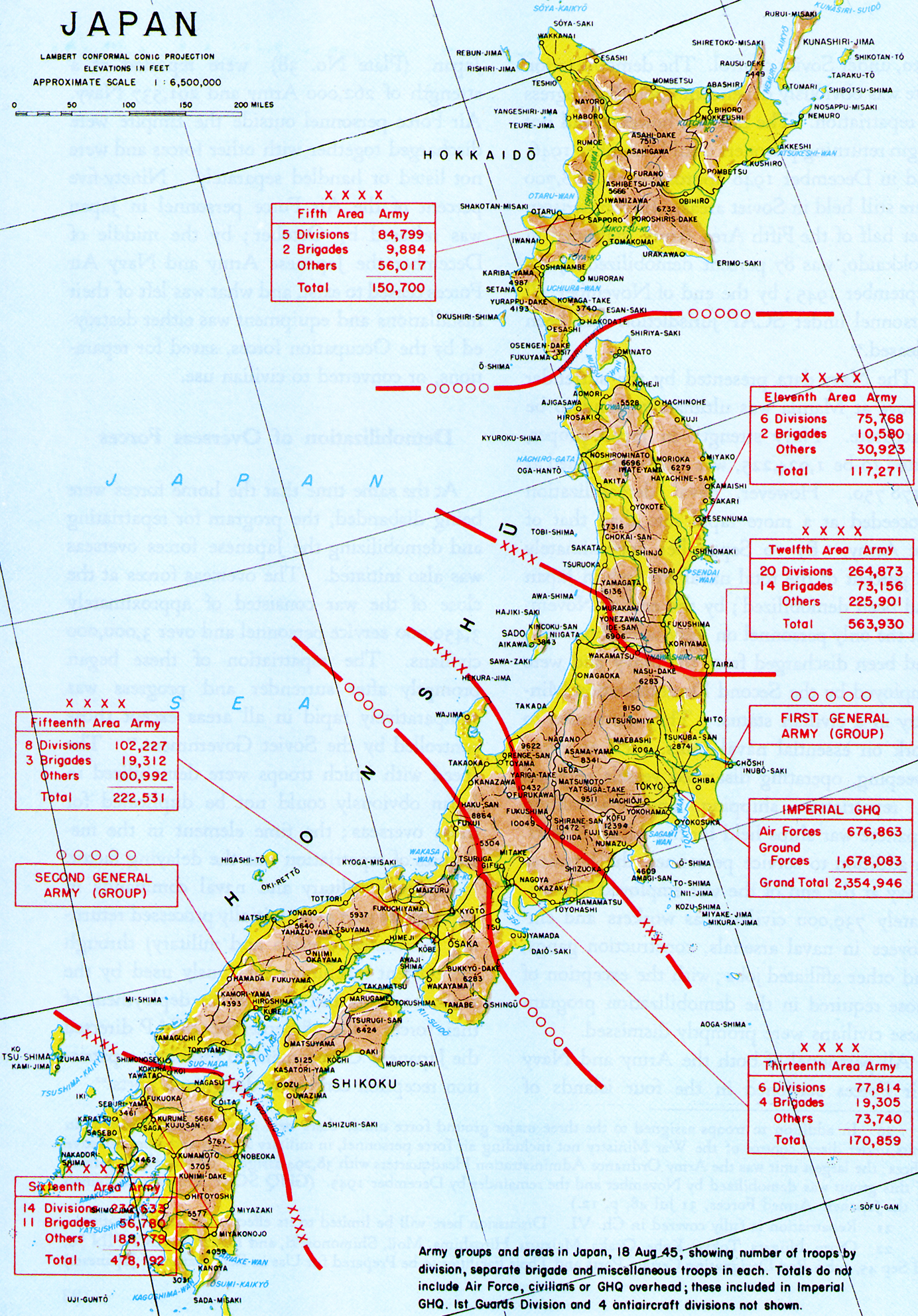
Disposition of the Imperial Japanese Army in Japan at the time of its capitulation, 18 August 1945

- 1870: consisted of 12,000 men.
- 1873: Seven divisions of c. 36,000 men (c. 46,250 including reserves)
- 1885: consisted of seven divisions including the Imperial Guard Division.
- In the early 1900s, the IJA consisted of 12 divisions, the Imperial Guard Division, and numerous other units. These contained the following:
  - 380,000 active duty and 1st Reserve personnel: former Class A and B(1) conscripts after two-year active tour with 17 and 1/2 year commitment
  - 50,000 Second line Reserve: Same as above but former Class B(2) conscripts
  - 220,000 National Army
    - 1st National Army: 37- to 40-year-old men from end of 1st Reserve to 40 years old.
    - 2nd National Army: untrained 20-year-olds and over-40-year-old trained reserves.
  - 4,250,000 men available for service and mobilization.
- 1922: 21 divisions and 308,000 men
- 1924: Post-WW1 reductions to 16 divisions and 250,800 men
- 1925: Reduction to 12 divisions
- 1934: army increased to 17 divisions
- 1936: 250,000 active.
- 1940: 376,000 active with 2 million reserves in 31 divisions
  - 2 divisions in Japan (Imperial Guard plus one other)
  - 2 divisions in Korea
  - 27 divisions in China and Manchuria
- In late 1941: 460,000 active in
  - 41 divisions
    - 2 in Japan and Korea
    - 12 in Manchuria
    - 27 in China
  - plus 59 brigade equivalents.
    - Independent brigades, Independent Mixed Brigades, Cavalry Brigades, Amphibious Brigades, Independent Mixed regiments, Independent Regiments.
- 1945: 5 million active in 145 divisions (includes three Imperial Guard), plus numerous individual units, with a large Volunteer Fighting Corps.
  - includes 650,000 Imperial Japanese Army Air Service.
  - Japan Defense Army in 1945 had 55 divisions (53 Infantry and two armor) and 32 brigades (25 infantry and seven armor) with 2.35 million men.
  - 2.25 million Army Labor Troops
  - 1.3 million Navy Labor Troops
  - 250,000 Special Garrison Force and Special Attack Units
  - 20,000 Kempetai military police

Total military in August 1945 was 6,095,000 including 676,863 Army Air Service.

A United States War department book, "The World at War, 1939-1944: A Brief History of World War II; Materials for the Use of Army Orientation Program" estimated that "nearly one million Japanese" had been killed in China between 1937-1944.

== Casualties ==
Over the course of the Imperial Japanese Army's existence, millions of its soldiers were either killed, wounded or listed as missing in action.

- Taiwan Expedition of 1874: 543 (12 killed in battle and 531 by disease)
- First Sino-Japanese War: The IJA suffered 1,132 dead and 3,758 wounded
- Russo-Japanese War: The number of total Japanese dead in combat is put at around 47,000, with around 80,000 if disease is included
- World War I: 300 Japanese were killed, mostly at the Battle of Tsingtao
- World War II:
  - Deaths
    - Between 2,120,000 and 2,190,000 Imperial Armed Forces dead including non-combat deaths (includes 1,760,955 killed in action),
    - KIA Breakdown by Theater:
      - Army 1931–1945: 1,569,661 [China: 435,600 KIA, Against U.S. Forces: 659,650 KIA, Burma Campaign: 163,000 KIA, Australian Combat Zone: 199,511 KIA, French Indochina: 7,900 KIA, U.S.S.R/Manchuria: 45,900 KIA, Others/Japan: 58,100 KIA]
      - Navy: 473,800 KIA All Theaters.
    - 672,000 known civilian dead,
  - 810,000 missing in action and presumed dead

== Equipment ==
Main page: List of Japanese military equipment of World War II

- Type 38 rifle
- Type 99 rifle
- Type 44 carbine
- Nambu pistol
- Type 97 grenade
- Type 97 heavy tank machine gun
- Type 99 light machine gun
- Type 96 light machine gun
- Type 11 light machine gun
- Type 100 submachine gun
- MP 28 SMG
- MP 34
- Type 30 rifle
- Type I rifle
- Type 91 grenade
- Type 4 70 mm AT rocket launcher
- Type 93 flamethrower
- Type 100 flamethrower
- Type 89 machine gun
- Type 92 heavy machine gun
- Type 1 heavy machine gun
- Type 26 revolver
- Murata rifle
- Type 35 rifle
- Type 3 heavy machine gun
- Type 30 bayonet
- Guntō
- Hino–Komuro pistol
- Sugiura pistol
- Type 97 sniper rifle
- Type 38 carbine
- Type 99 sniper rifle
- Karabiner 98k
- Vz. 24 (captured weapons)
- Type 10 grenade
- Type 98 grenade
- Type 99 grenade
- Type 3 grenade
- Type 4 grenade
- Lunge mine
- Type 93 heavy machine gun

== See also ==
- Army War College (Japan)
- Artillery of Japan
- Boeitai
- Comfort bag
- Double Leaf Society
- Epidemic Prevention and Water Purification Department
- Ethnic Taiwanese Imperial Japan Serviceman
- F Kikan/I Kikan
- Gakutotai
- Hikari Kikan
- Himeyuri students
- Imperial Japanese Army Academy
- Imperial Japanese Army General Staff Office
- Imperial Japanese rations
- Imperial Way Faction or Kodô-Ha
- Inspectorate General of Military Training
- Japanese army and diplomatic codes
- Japanese Army Railways and Shipping Section
- Japanese Army and Navy Strategies for South Seas areas (1942)
- Japanese holdouts ("stragglers") who surrendered after 1945
- Japanese Korean Army
- Kokuryū-kai – The Black Dragon Society
- List of Bombs in use by Imperial Japanese Army
- List of Japanese military equipment of World War II
- List of Japanese tanks of World War II
- List of Japanese trainer aircraft during World War II
- List of Japanese Army military engineer vehicles of World War II
- List of Japanese government and military commanders of World War II
- List of Japanese Infantry divisions
- List of Radars in use by Imperial Japanese Army
- Military Medal of Honor (Japan)
- Nanshin-ron or Strike South Group
- Nakano School
- Noborito Research Institute
- Osaka Arsenal
- Rikugun Shikan Gakko
- Senbu
- Senjinkun military code
- Takasago Volunteers
- Tokyo Second Army Arsenal
- Tondenhei
- Tosei-Ha or Control Faction
- Tsūshōgō
- Uniforms of the Imperial Japanese Army
- Volunteer Fighting Corps
- Yokusan Sonendan

== Bibliography ==
- Drea, Edward J. (2009). Japan's Imperial Army: Its Rise and Fall, 1853–1945. Lawrence, Kansas: University Press of Kansas. ISBN 9780803217089.
- Drea, Edward J. (2003). "The Imperial Japanese Army (1868–1945): Origins, Evolution, Legacy". War in the Modern World Since 1815. Routledge. ISBN 0415251400.
- Gilmore, Allison B. (1998). You Can't Fight Tanks with Bayonets: Psychological Warfare against the Japanese Army in the South West Pacific. Lincoln, Nebraska: University of Nebraska Press. ISBN 0803221673.
- Harries, Meirion; Harries, Susie (1994). Soldiers of the Sun: The Rise and Fall of the Imperial Japanese Army. New York: Random House. ISBN 0679753036.
- Humphreys, Leonard A. (1996). The Way of the Heavenly Sword: The Japanese Army in the 1920s. Stanford University Press. ISBN 0804723753.
- Jansen, Marius B. (2002). The Making of Modern Japan. Harvard University Press. ISBN 0674003349.
- Jaundrill, Colin D. (2016). Benjamin A. Haynes (ed.). Samurai to Soldier: Remaking Military Service in Nineteenth-Century Japan. Melissa Haynes. Cornell University Press. ISBN 9781501706646.
- Jowett, Philip (2002). The Japanese Army 1931–45 (1). Botley, Oxford: Osprey Publishing. ISBN 1841763535.
- Kelman, Richard; Leo J. Daugherty (2002). Fighting Techniques of a Japanese Infantryman in World War II: Training, Techniques and Weapons. Zenith Imprint. ISBN 0760311455.
- Olender, Piotr (2014). Sino-Japanese Naval War 1894–1895. MMPBooks. ISBN 9788363678302.
- Ravina, Mark (2004). The Last Samurai : The Life and Battles of Saigō Takamori. John Wiley & Sons. ISBN 0471089702.
