= Jacques Faure =

Jacques Faure may refer to:

- Jacques Faure (French Army officer) (1904–1988), French Army general and skier
- Jacques Faure (ambassador), former French co-chair of the OSCE Minsk Group

== See also ==
- Jacques-Paul Faure (1869–1924), head of the French military mission to Japan (1918–1919)
