= Type 93/Type 100 flamethrower =

Type 93 flamethrower
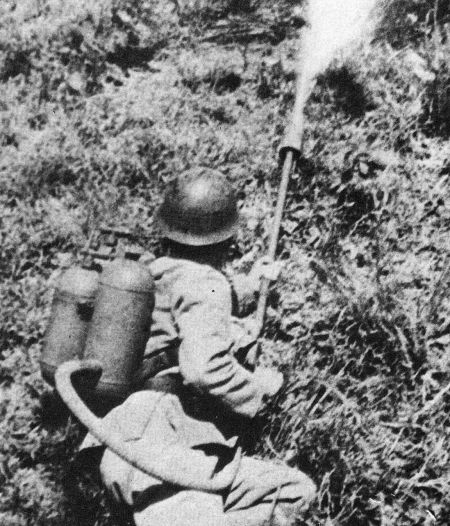
- Type 93 flamethrower
- Type: Flamethrower
- Place of origin: Empire of Japan

Service history
- In service: 1933–1945
- Used by: Imperial Japanese Army; Imperial Japanese Navy
- Wars: Second Sino-Japanese War; World War II

Production history
- Designed: 1932
- Produced: 1935–1945
- No. built: 5,920

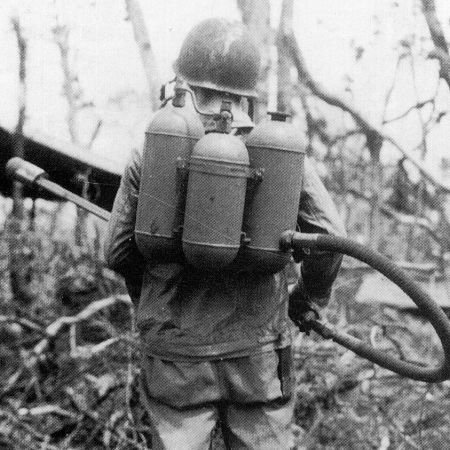
Type 100 flamethrower

The Type 93 and Type 100 flamethrowers (九十三式小火焔発射機/百式火焔発射機, Kyūjūsan-shiki shō-kaenhasshaki/Hyaku-shiki kaenhasshaki) were flamethrowers used by the Imperial Japanese Army and Imperial Japanese Navy's SNLF during the Second Sino-Japanese War and World War II.

== History and development ==
Japanese military observers stationed in Europe noted effectiveness of flamethrowers during the trench warfare conditions of World War I, particularly against battlefield fortifications, bunkers, pillboxes and similar protected emplacements, which had given the Japanese Army such grief during the Siege of Port Arthur during the Russo-Japanese War of 1904-1905.

The Type 93 flamethrower, largely based on European designs, entered service in 1933. It was used in Manchukuo against the ill-prepared National Revolutionary Army of the Republic of China and against local warlord forces with considerable psychological effect. However, its ignition system based on a heated electrical wire had reliability issues under cold weather conditions which led to a redesign designated the Type 100 flamethrower in 1940. Both types remained in service during World War II. Production of Japanese flamethrowers peaked in 1940 due to the likelihood of assaulting Soviet fortifications, but waned afterwards as China and the central Pacific largely lacked substantial fortifications.

== Design ==
Both the Type 93 and Type 100 consisted of a fuel unit, fuel hose, and flame gun. A modification in the design of the flame gun is the only difference between the two types. The fuel unit consisted of three 38 cm (15 in) long, 15 cm (5.9 in) diameter cylinders: two outer fuel cylinders and a central nitrogen pressure cylinder. The total fuel capacity was 12.3 liters. Fuel was a mixture of gasoline and tar. Pressure was controlled by a manually operated needle valve, one on the top of each of the two fuel cylinders. This tank assembly was fitted with straps to permit it to be carried on the operator's back like an infantry pack.

The 1,140 mm (45 in) fuel hose was made of reinforced rubber tubing, with brass fittings on both ends. The flame gun, three to four feet long, was a 25 mm (1 in) diameter tube with a fuel ejection handle located near the hose connection, and a 6 mm (1/4-inch) nozzle with the firing mechanism attached to the other end.

Fuel (in the Type 100) was ignited by a blank cartridge fired from a revolver mechanism in the flame gun, which held ten rounds. The fuel ejection handle fired a cartridge when it opened the fuel ejection valve. When the handle was returned to its closed position parallel to the tube, the flow of fuel stopped, and the magazine revolved to place a new cartridge in the firing position. The duration of a continuous discharge was 10 to 12 seconds with a maximum range of 22 to 27 meters.

	Type 93	Type 100
Maximum range	22–27 m (24–30 yd)	
Maximum discharge time	10 to 12 seconds	
Fuel capacity	12.3 L (3.2 US gal)	
Weight	26 kg (57 lb) (approx)	
Flame gun length	1,200 mm (47 in))	900 mm (35 in)
Flame gun weight	4.5 kg (9.9 lb)	4 kg (8.8 lb)
Nozzle outlet tip	Fixed	Removable
Diameter of cartridge	11.1 mm (0.44 in)	12.3 mm (0.48 in)

== Combat record ==
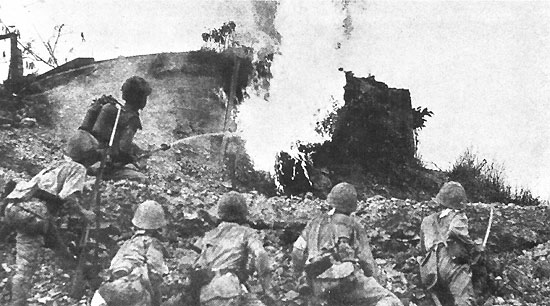
A Type 93 flamethrower in action during the Battle of Bataan, 1942.

Flamethrowers were assigned to engineering regiments within each Japanese infantry division. A typical engineering regiment would be equipped with between six and twenty flamethrowers, which were operated by a designated flamethrower company. The Type 100 Flamethrower was primarily used in the early stages of the Pacific War, mostly in the Dutch East Indies, Burma and the Philippines. Type 100-equipped Japanese paratroopers participated in the Battle of Palembang in 1942. There was little need for flamethrowers later in the war since Japan was on the defensive and had few opportunities to attack enemy fortifications. In later stages of the war, the Japanese army attempted to use the Type 100 flamethrower as an anti-tank weapon, largely due to lack of any effective anti-tank guns, and with some success.

== See also ==
- List of flamethrowers
