= Sugiura pistol =

Sugiura
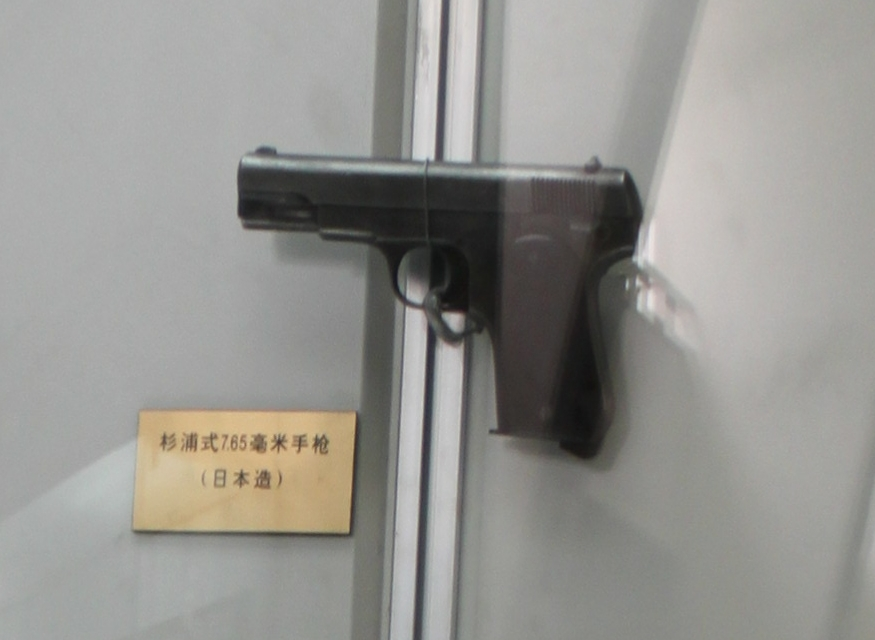
- Type: Semi-automatic pistol
- Place of origin: Japan/China

Service history
- Used by: Japan
- Wars: Second World War

Production history
- Manufacturer: Sugiura Firearms Manufacturing Company
- Produced: 1945
- No. built: 6,000 (Approximately)

Specifications
- Barrel length: 4 inches (100 mm)
- Cartridge: .25 ACP (6.35 mm Browning).32 ACP (7.65 mm Browning)
- Action: Blow-back
- Effective firing range: 50 m
- Feed system: 8 round box magazine

The Sugiura pistol is a Japanese-designed handgun that was manufactured in the puppet state of Manchukuo for issue to occupying forces. The handgun is chambered in the .32 ACP (7.65 mm Browning) cartridge, is of straight blow-back operation and has an eight-round box magazine. The finish is salt-blue and the grips are checkered walnut. From photographic evidence, the design appears to have been inspired by the Colt 1903.
