= French military mission to Japan (1918–1919) =

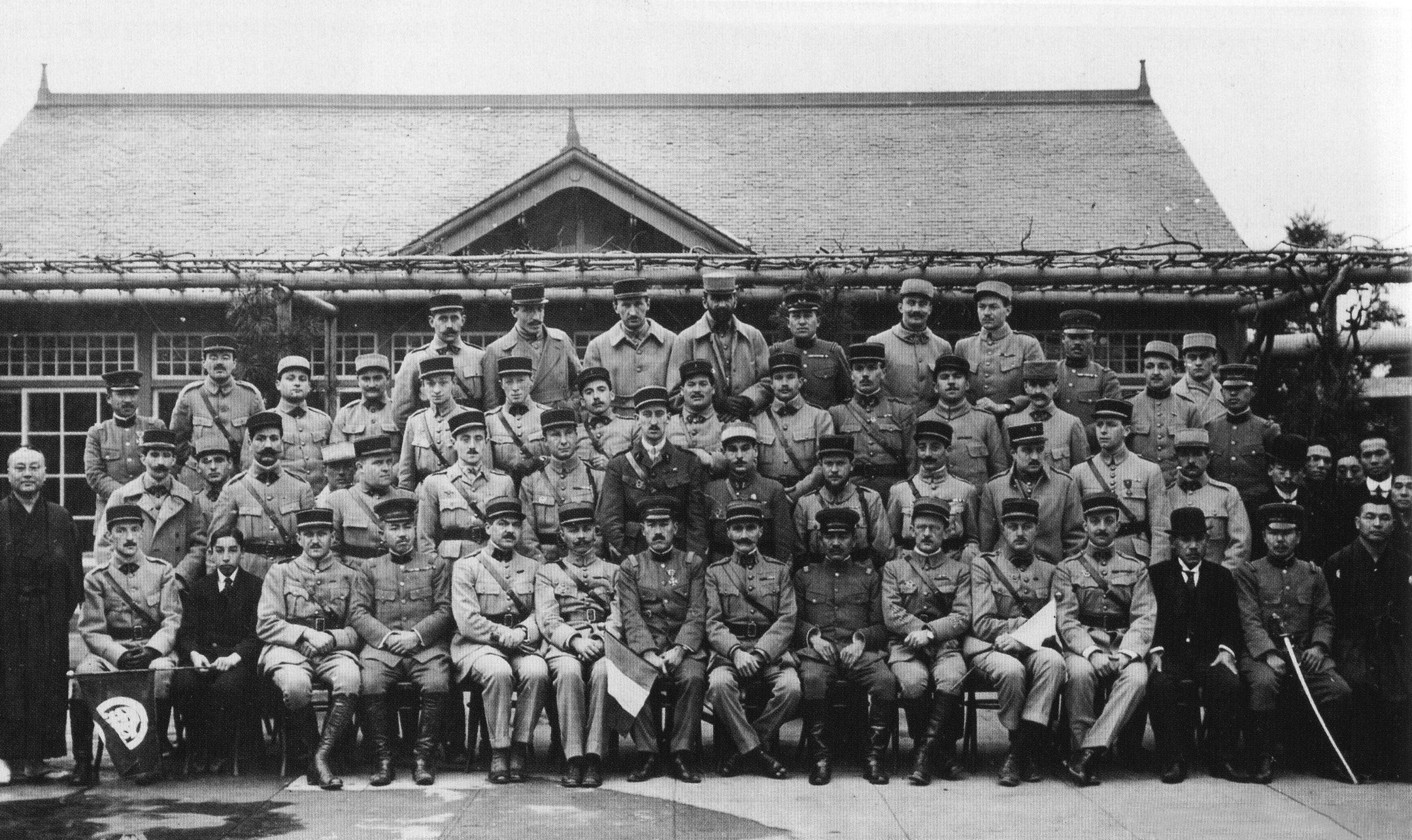
French Military Mission to Japan 1918–1919.

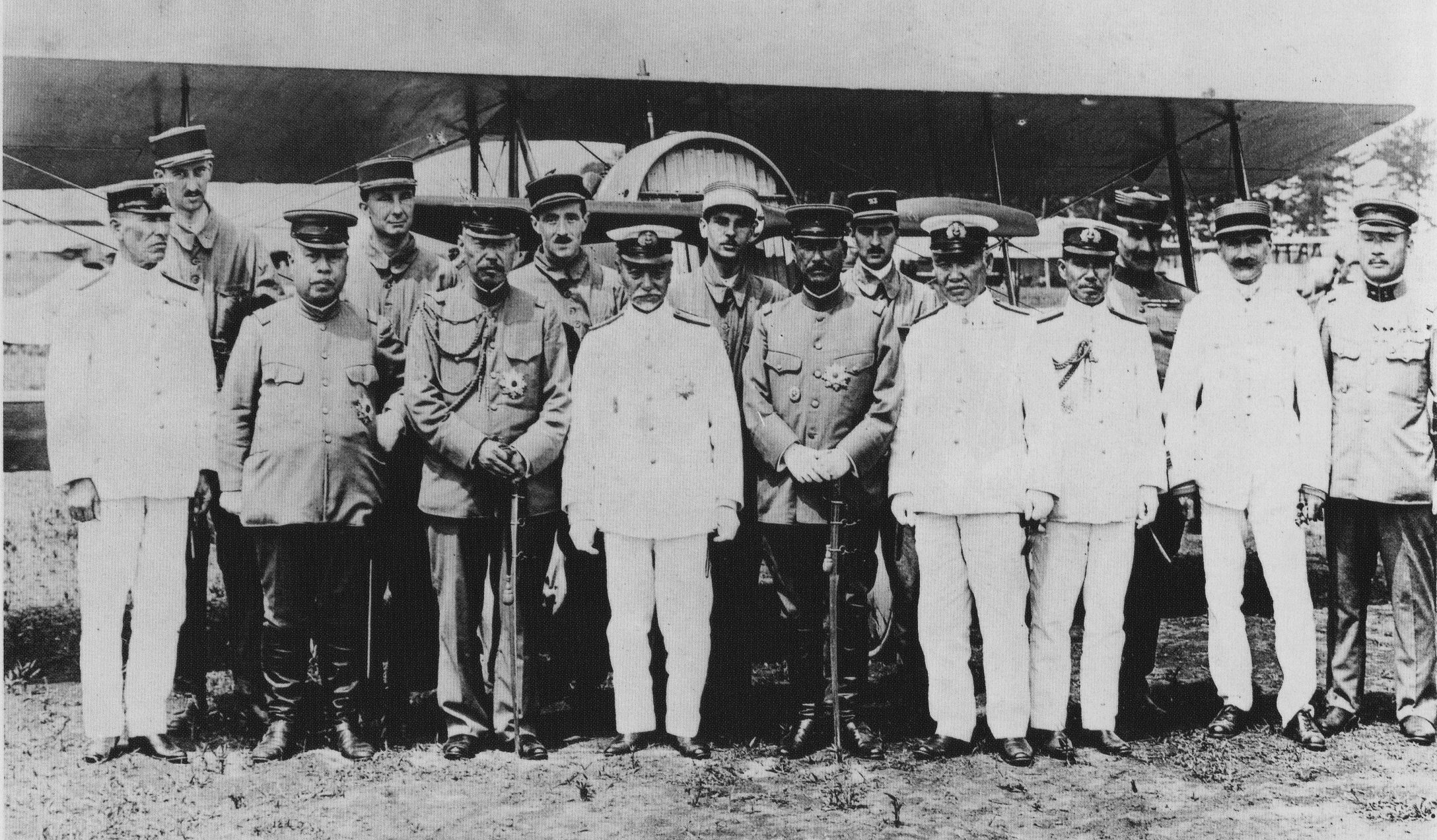
Tōgō Heihachirō with members of the French Airforce Mission to Japan (1918–1919) in Gifu.

The French Aeronautical Mission to Japan (1918–1919) was the first foreign military mission to Japan since the 1890s.

In 1918, Japan invited the fourth French Military Mission, composed of 50 members and equipped with several of the newest types of airplanes, to establish the fundamentals of the Japanese airforce (the planes were several Salmson 2A2, Nieuport, Spad XIII, two Breguet XIV, as well as Caquot dirigeables).

The mission was headed by Jacques-Paul Faure, an artillery Colonel, and composed of members of all arms, including about 20 members of the French air services.

The success of the mission prompted the Japanese Navy to invite the Sempill Mission from Britain.
