= Japanese military strategies in 1942 =

Immediately after the fall of Singapore in 1942 certain Army circles argued that Japan should exploit her advantage and seek peace with Great Britain. The heart of this reasoning was that Japan could not knock out both the United States and England, judging from such factors as a national strength and geographical location.

The Soviet Army had recovered from its initial setbacks in the war with Japan's ally Germany, and had regained its feet. Under the circumstances, Japan should plan to conclude a so-called compromise peace, seizing the opportunity after attainment of her war objectives. This sentiment was held by very few people, however, and most of the military paid scant attention to it. Planning for and prosecution of war then followed.

== Expected counterattacks ==
Between February and March 1942, Imperial General Headquarters was anxious about the next steps which were to follow the close of the first-phase operations. In planning second-phase operations, the Army Operations Bureau estimated that counter-offensives could be expected to start in 1943. Two basic elements went into the formulation of this judgment.

As for the scale of counterattack, the operations people could make no definitive estimate, because they had no basis for forecasting. Some of the staff officers thought that the counteroffensive might center around a force of several Marine Corps divisions. The estimates proved overly optimistic. The American counter-assault began in the latter half of 1942.

Imperial General Headquarters Intelligence Estimates of Allied Strength (Early May 1942)
United States (Pacific Coast)	Land Forces: 1,888,000 (43 fully equipped divisions) Aircraft: 3,650 first line operatives Forecast: Towards end of 1942, ground forces will number about 2,000,000; first line warplanes will reach about 6,000
United States (Hawaii)	Land Forces: Land Forces: 35,000 Army Aircraft: 150
Midway Atoll	Land Forces: 1,700 Army & Navy Aircraft: 59
West Samoa	Land Forces: 750 U.S.Navy Aircraft: 20
Fiji	Land Forces: 7,500 U.S. & British Army Aircraft: 20
New Caledonia and Loyalty	Land Forces: 3,000 U.S. & De Gaullist Army Airplanes: 10
Australia	Land Forces: 350,000 (10 Australian Divisions) Aircraft: 500 Forecast: U.S. Army now arriving: 1 or 2 Divisions plus New Zealand Units
New Zealand	Land Forces: 70,000 (3 New Zealand divisions) Aircraft: 250
British India	Land Forces: 5,000,000 (7 Divisions British Army,23 Divisions Indian Army) Aircraft: 350
Ceylon	Land Forces: 1-2 British divisions

This mental relaxation could be observed not only in Tokyo but in the Southern Army as well-which was perhaps only natural. The Southern Army, for example, united its headquarters Intelligence Section with the Operations Section after the close of the first phase of the war, alleging that the intelligence staff had lost its raison d'etre at that stage. This action of the Southern Army, ignoring the intelligence function, was taken without the approval of IGHQ and typified contempt for the combat strength of the Allies. There was consequently an inability to forecast the large-scale counteroffensives launched by the Americans and the British in the near future. Indeed, the Southern Army's Intelligence Section was not re-activated until February 6, 1944.

== Redeployment in China ==
The principles of the redeployment were as follows:

- Southern Regions: Rearrange the system of military administration in effect throughout the occupied areas. Return the 2nd Imperial Guard, 4th, and 5th Divisions to the homeland. Dispatch the 33rd Division to China, the 16th to Manchuria. Place the Fourteenth Army under the direct control of IGHQ.
- Chinese Theater: Transfer the 33rd Division from the southern regions. (This plan could not be effected in practice.) Activate one armored division and six infantry divisions (59th, 60th, and 68th through 71st).
- Manchuria: Activate two Area Army headquarters, one Army headquarters, one Mechanized Army headquarters, and two armored divisions: 1st and 2nd, with headquarters at Mutanchiang and Poli, respectively. Return older troops to the homeland; rejuvenate the remaining units.

== July mobilizations ==
On July 4, 1942, IGHQ ordered the following units activated:

- First Area Army (commanded by Lieutenant General Tomoyuki Yamashita, with headquarters at Mutanchiang).
- Second Area Army (commanded by Lieutenant General Korechika Anami, with headquarters at Tsitsihar).
- Second Army (commanded by Lieutenant General Yoshio Kozuki, with headquarters at Yenchi).
- Mechanized Army (commanded by Lieutenant General Shin Yoshida, with headquarters at Ssupingchieh).
- Homeland Area: Activate the 52nd Division. (This could not be accomplished.)
- Air Force: Set up Third Air Army Headquarters in the southern region, with about five air groups. This headquarters is to control air defense operations in key areas on Sumatra and Java, as well as handle offensive actions overseas against India and China. The order of battle of the Third Air Army was issued on July 10, 1942. Lieutenant General Hideyoshi Obata was the commander, with headquarters at Singapore. On June 29, 1942, IGHQ issued a set of orders to General Hisaichi Terauchi, commanding the Southern Army. The essentials follow:

To win the war, IGHQ needed stability in vital portions of the southern regions, and the establishment of self-sufficient, impregnable foundations. Operations, moreover, was to be prepared in conformity with all possible eventualities. In conjunction with the Navy, the Army Commander should endeavor to stabilize important regions in the south, and to prepare Outer Perimeter operations based upon the below-cited precepts:

- Burma, Malaya, Sumatra, Java, (British) Borneo: The Army should seek to complete the defense of these areas, and to extend military administration throughout.
- Thailand, Indo-China: The Army will co-operate with the authorities in their defense.
- Pressure upon Chungking will be applied from the directions of Burma, Indo-China, and Thailand.
- Offensive aerial operations will be undertaken against India and China.

IGHQ also directed the Southern Army to undertake a number of measures:

- Set up air bases in French Indo-China, Thailand, Burma, Malaya,

Sumatra, Java, and the Philippines. Singapore will be the hub.

- Expand facilities for supply and for the repair of aircraft.
- Intensify local self-sufficiency to decrease supply requirements on the homeland.

=== Planned operations in Outer Perimeter ===
One of the operations, The Port Moresby Operation or Operation Mo, had the objective of taking possession of strategic island points to intensify a cutoff in the contact between the United States and Australia, while squelching the Americans' and Australians' plans of counterattack from the same areas. An action was slated to begin about the beginning of July 1942, using the following forces:

- Bulk of the Seventeenth Army (built around nine infantry battalions)
- Second fleet Air arm built around First Air Fleet

=== Seventeenth Army and Guadalcanal operations ===
Fighting had meanwhile erupted on Guadalcanal Island. On August 13, the Seventeenth Army (with the Ichiki Detachment in support) was ordered to continue the Eastern New Guinea Operation, while simultaneously recapturing Guadalcanal in concert with the Navy.

==== Implications of loss at Midway ====
The failure of the Midway Operation was caused by negligence, and the effects were so tremendous that Japanese Army operations in the Pacific were shaken to their very roots. Because of the failure, the Japanese Navy also lost its mastery forever, since a quick recovery from the smashing blow to the carrier fleet was impossible. It was difficult for Japan either to build large aircraft carriers or to train skilled airmen overnight.

== Aleutian Islands ==
=== June landings ===
On June 6, 1942, the North Seas Detachment landed on Kiska, and the next day upon Attu, without meeting resistance. No landings were made, in Adak and the mission of occupying that island was canceled on June 25. IGHQ (on October 24) reinforced the North Seas Detachment and also changed its name to the North Seas Garrison Unit. Commanded by Major General Juichiro Mineki, the force was primarily composed of three infantry battalions and was under the operational control of the Commander-in-Chief of the Fifth Fleet.

The United States Army constructed air bases at both Adak (about the end of August 1942) and at Amchitka, near Kiska (around February 1943). On March 26, 1943, a naval battle occurred near the Komandorski Islands, within Soviet territorial waters, but neither side suffered serious losses.
