= Jacques-Paul Faure =

French army officer (1869–1924)

Jacques-Paul Faure (14 November 1869 – 24 August 1924) was an officer of the French Army. He studied in the French Ecole Polytechnique (promotion 1889). He led the French Military Mission to Japan (1918-1919).

== Biography ==
Jacques-Paul Faure was born November 14, 1869, in Clermont-Ferrand. He joined the French Army in September 1887. He was received in October, 1889 in the Ecole Polytechnique, the French leading mathematics military school. He started his career in artillery, but turned in 1912 into the Aeronautical Military Service. During the First World War, he worked in the French headquarters in Chalons-sur-Marne, then back in 1917 in the 207e artillery regiment. On 25 August 1918, he led the French Military Mission to Japan (1918-1919), where he became Colonel. During this mission, he organised the studies of Japanese pilots and engineers.
