= Hiji Falls =

Japanese tourist destination

Coordinates: 26°42′38″N 128°11′11″E

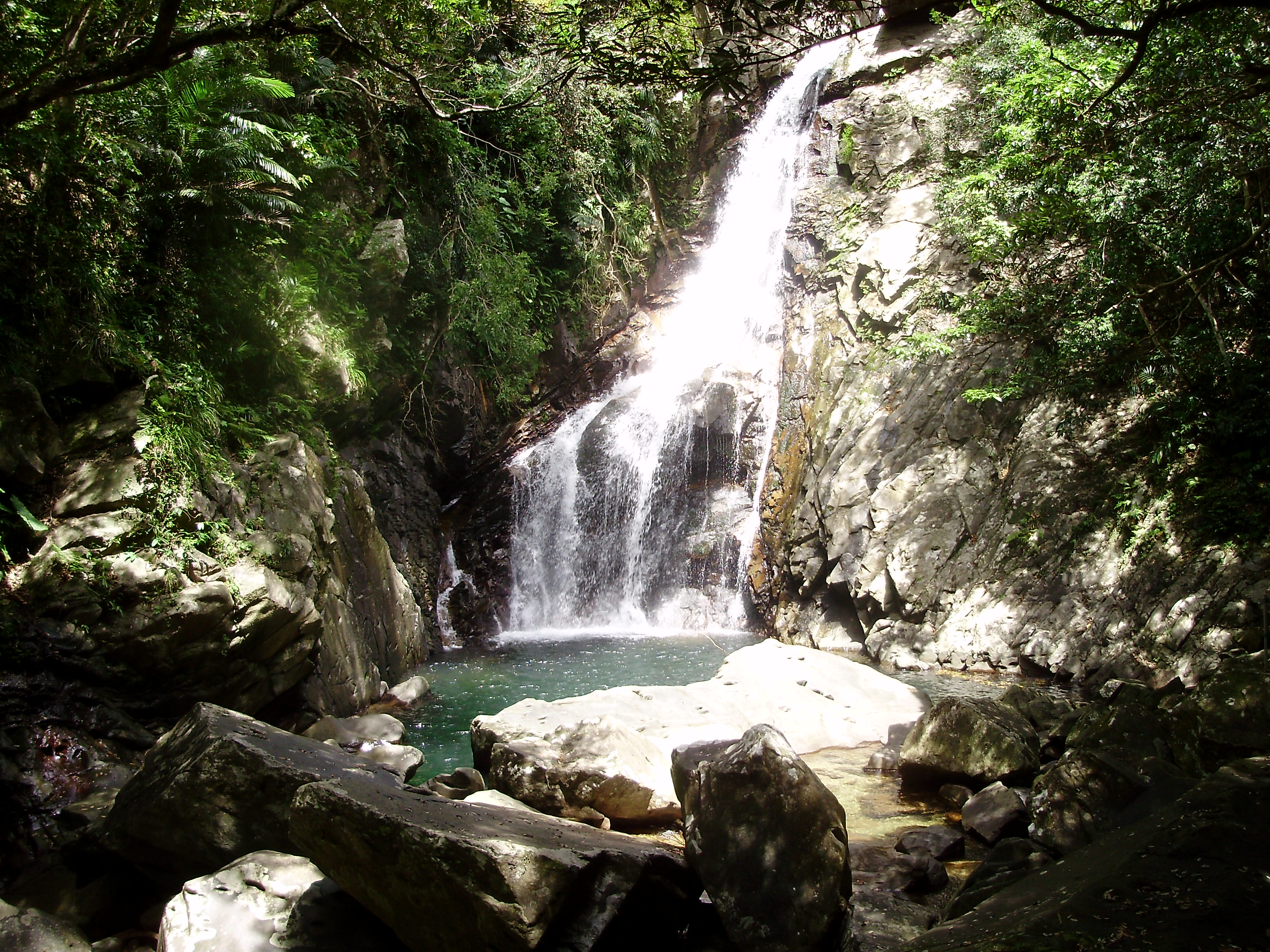
View of the Hiji Falls.(July 2009)

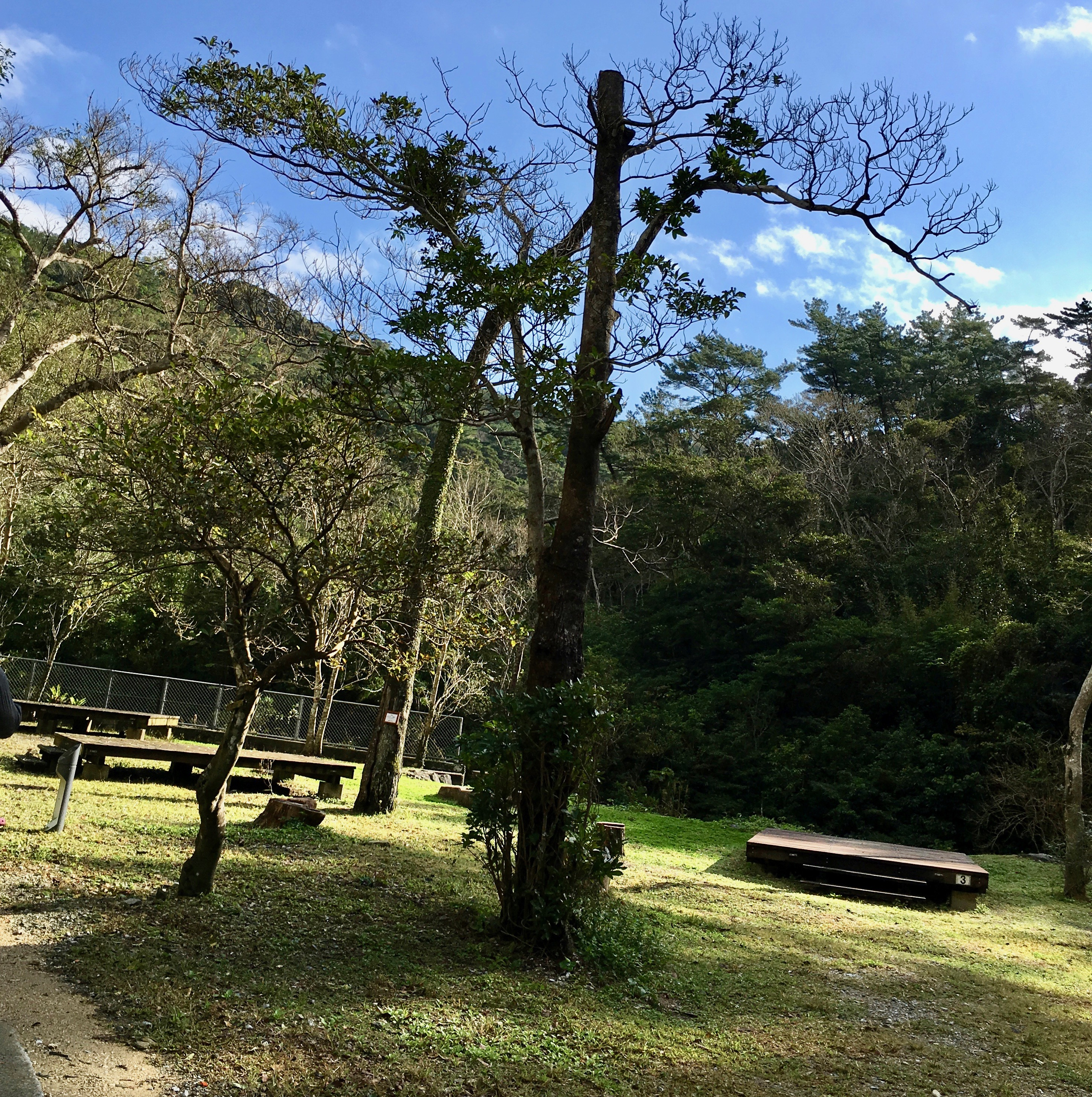
Camp grounds

Hiji Falls (比地大滝, Hiji Ōtaki) is a National Park and a popular tourist destination on the island and prefecture of Okinawa, Japan. It is located in the northern part of the Okinawa Island, approximately 20 kilometers north of the city of Nago and close to the Yambaru National Park. The falls and the ensuing river flow region tropical most of the year. It is a popular destination for both sightseers and hikers. From start to the finish, the finished trail is about 2 miles, with many steep stairs throughout the path. Camping is permitted with various camp sites. People visiting the area are warned not to swim near the falls because there have been two deaths since 2013 and various falls.
