= Okinawa Island =

Largest of the Okinawa Islands in Japan

沖縄本島 沖縄 / うちなー ふちなー
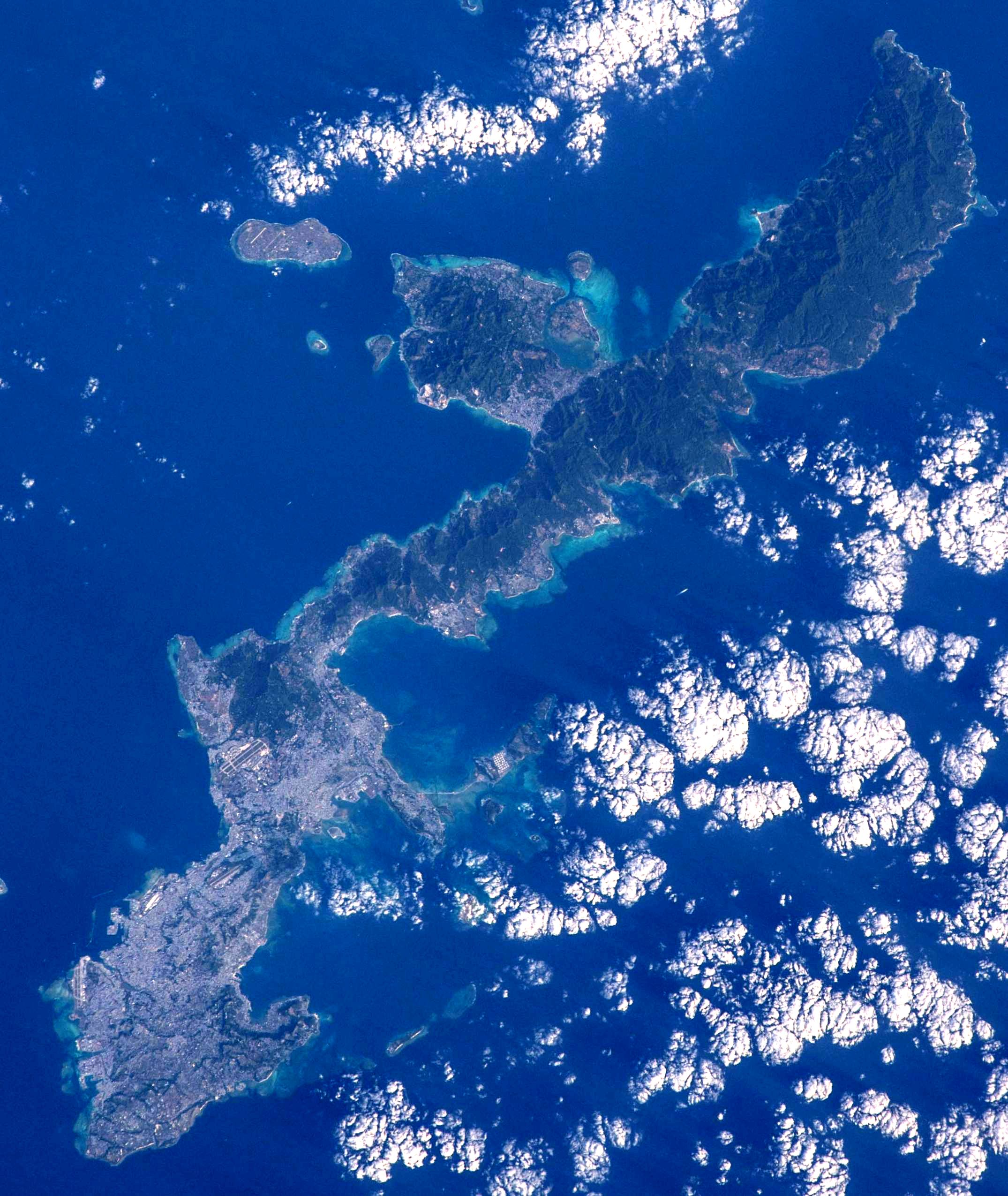
- Okinawa Island in January 2015

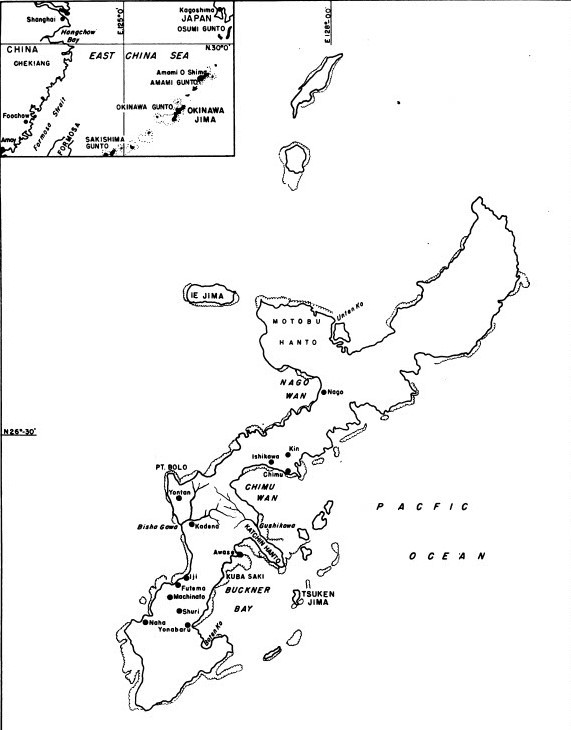
- Map of the island

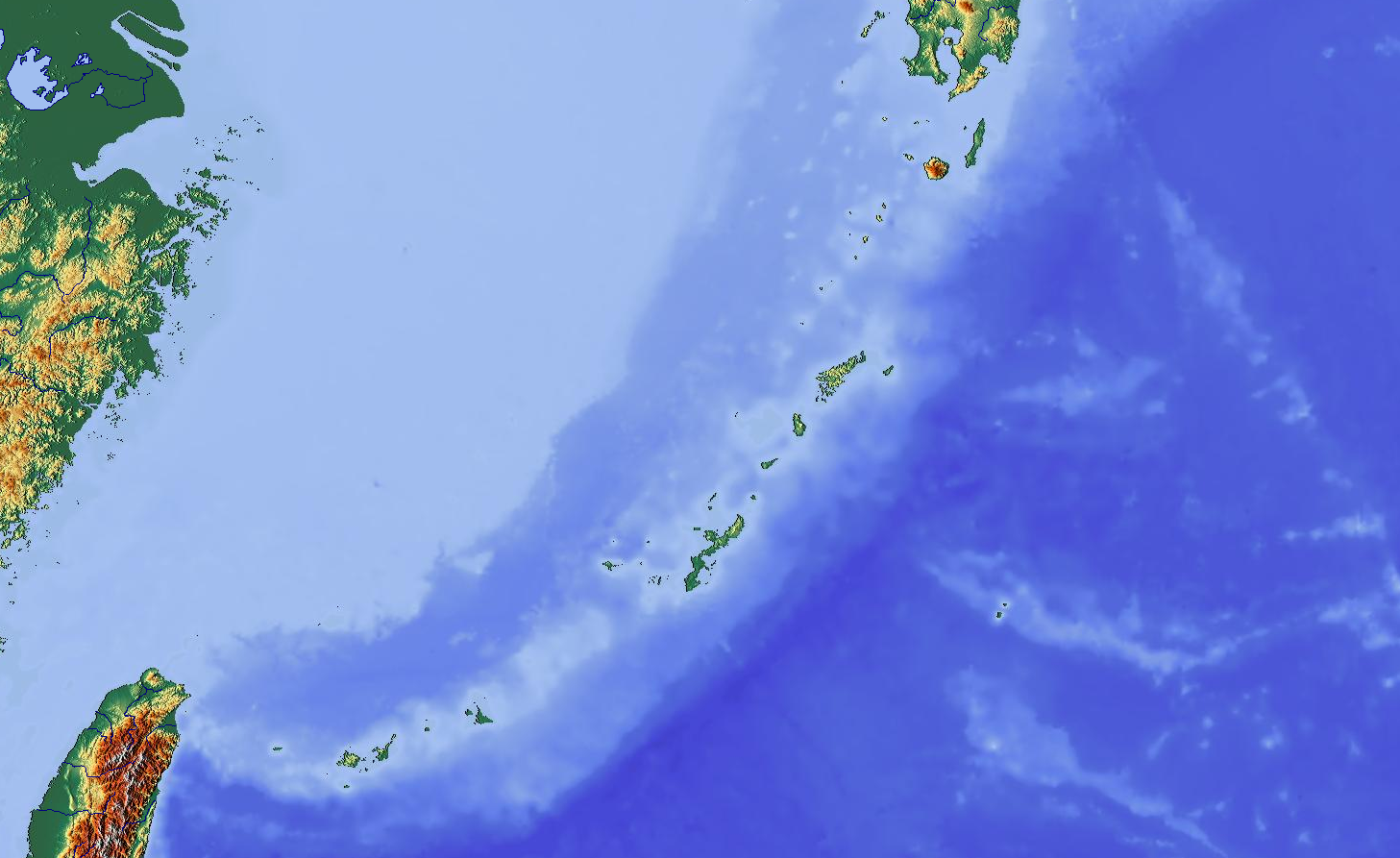
- Location within Ryukyu Islands Location within Asia

Geography
- Location: Pacific Ocean
- Coordinates: 26°28′46″N 127°55′40″E
- Archipelago: Ryukyu Islands
- Area: 1,199 km^{2} (463 sq mi) as of 1 October 2018
- Area rank: 289th
- Length: 106.6 km (66.24 mi)
- Width: 11.3 km (7.02 mi)
- Highest elevation: 503 m (1650 ft)
- Highest point: Mount Yonaha

Administration
- Japan
- Prefecture: Okinawa Prefecture

Demographics
- Population: 1,466,870 (2022)
- Pop. density: 1,014.93/km^{2} (2628.66/sq mi)
- Ethnic groups: Ryukyuan, Japanese

Okinawa Island (Japanese: 沖縄島, Hepburn: Okinawa-jima; Okinawan: 沖縄 / うちなー, romanized: Uchinā; Kunigami: ふちなー, romanized: Fuchináa), also known as Okinawa Main Island (沖縄本島, Okinawa-hontō), is the largest of the Okinawa Islands and the Ryukyu (Nansei) Islands of Japan in the Kyushu region. The island is approximately 106 kilometres (66 mi) long, an average 11 kilometres (7 mi) wide, and has an area of 1,206.98 square kilometers (466.02 sq mi). It is roughly 640 kilometres (350 nmi; 400 mi) south of the main island of Kyushu and the rest of Japan. It is 500 km (270 nmi; 310 mi) northeast of Taiwan. The total population of Okinawa Island was 1,384,762 in 2009. The greater Naha area has roughly 800,000 residents, while the city itself has about 320,000 people. Naha is the seat of Okinawa Prefecture on the southwestern part of Okinawa Island. Okinawa has a humid subtropical climate.

Okinawa has been a strategic location for the United States Armed Forces since the Battle of Okinawa and the end of World War II. The island was formally controlled by the United States Civil Administration of the Ryukyu Islands until 1972, with around 26,000 U.S. military personnel stationed on Okinawa today, comprising about half of the total complement of the United States Forces Japan, spread among 31 areas, across 13 bases and 48 training sites. United States military installations cover approximately 25% of the island and have been a point of contention among locals. Crimes committed by US military personnel, notably the 1995 Okinawa rape incident, have caused protests against the US military presence in Okinawa.

== History ==
=== Shell mound eras ===
Early Okinawan history is defined by midden or shell heap culture and is divided into Early, Middle, and Late Shell Mound periods. The Early Shell Mound period was a hunter-gatherer society, with the wave-like opening Jōmon pottery. In the latter part of this period, archaeological sites moved near the seashore, suggesting the engagement of people in fishing. On Okinawa, rice was not cultivated until the Middle Shell Mound period. Shell rings for arms made of shells obtained in the Sakishima Islands, namely Miyakojima and Yaeyama islands, were imported by Japan. In these islands, the presence of shell axes from 2,500 years ago suggests the influence of a southeastern-Pacific culture.

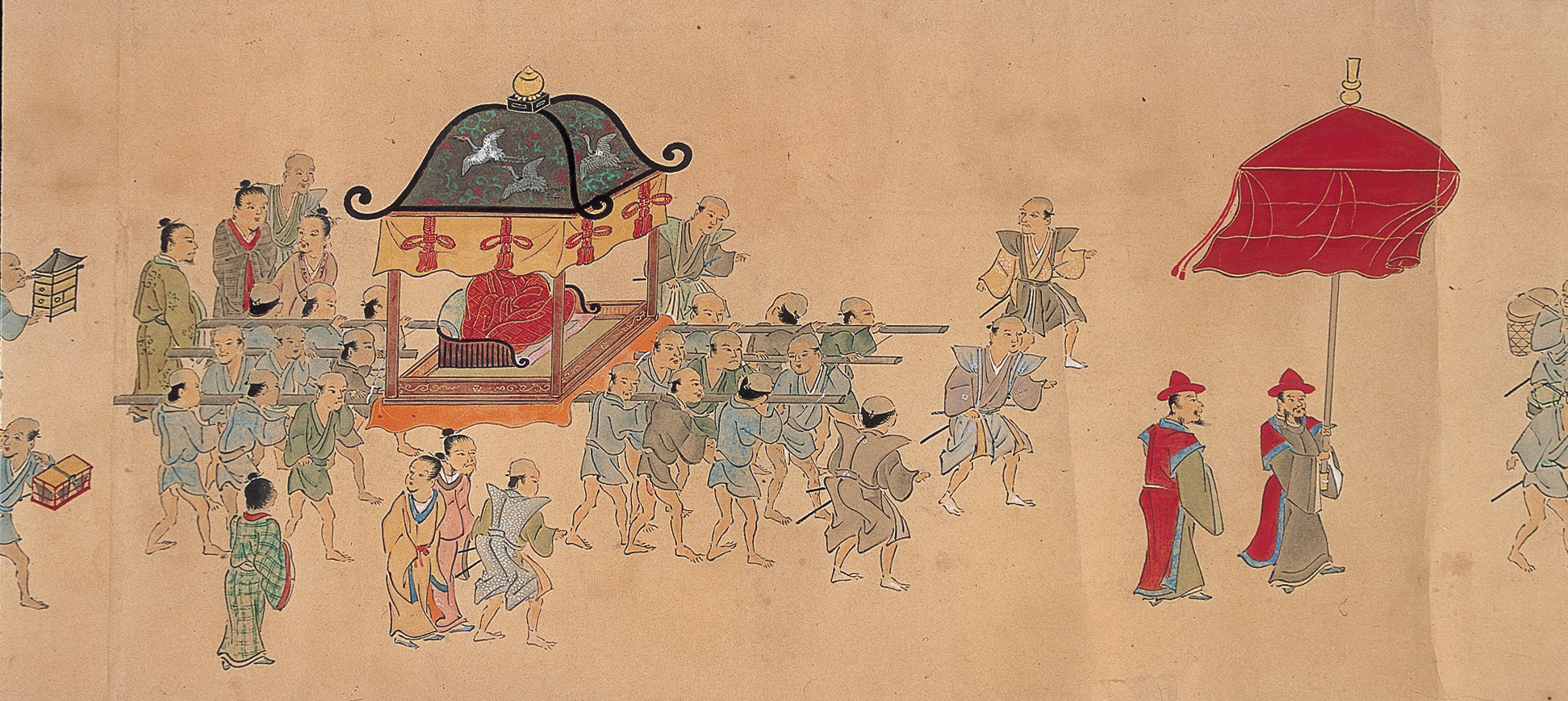
The first of the Ryukyuan missions to Edo, the capital of Tokugawa shogunate

After the late Shell Mound period, agriculture started about the 12th century, and the population center moved from the seashore to higher places. This period is called the Gusuku period. Gusuku is a term used for the distinctive Ryukyuan form of castles or fortresses. Many gusuku and related cultural remains in the Ryukyu Islands have been listed by UNESCO as World Heritage Sites. There are three perspectives regarding the nature of gusuku: that they were holy places, dwellings encircled by stones, and castles of the rulers. In this period, porcelain trade between Okinawa and other countries became commonplace, and Okinawa was an important relay point in eastern-Asian trade. Ryukyuan kings, such as Shunten and Eiso, were important rulers. An attempted Mongolian invasion in 1291 during the Eiso dynasty failed. Hiragana was imported from Japan by Ganjin in 1265. Noro, village priestesses of the Ryukyuan religion, appeared.

=== Sanzan era and Ryūkyū Kingdom ===
The Sanzan period began in 1314 when the kingdoms of Hokuzan and Nanzan declared independence from Chūzan. The three kingdoms competed with one another for recognition as a vassal state of Ming China. King Satto, leading Chūzan, was very successful, establishing relations with Korea and Southeast Asia as well as China. The Hongwu Emperor of China sent a large population of Chinese migrants, primarily consisting of 36 large families from Fujian Province, in 1392 at the request of the Ryukyuan king. The purpose of the migration was to increase the population of the Ryukyuan kingdom as well as enhance maritime relations between the Chinese empire and the Ryukyuan kingdom. The Chinese migrants assisted the Ryukyuans in developing their technology and diplomatic relations. In 1407, however, a man named Hashi overthrew Satto's descendant, King Bunei, and installed his father, Shishō, as king of Chūzan.

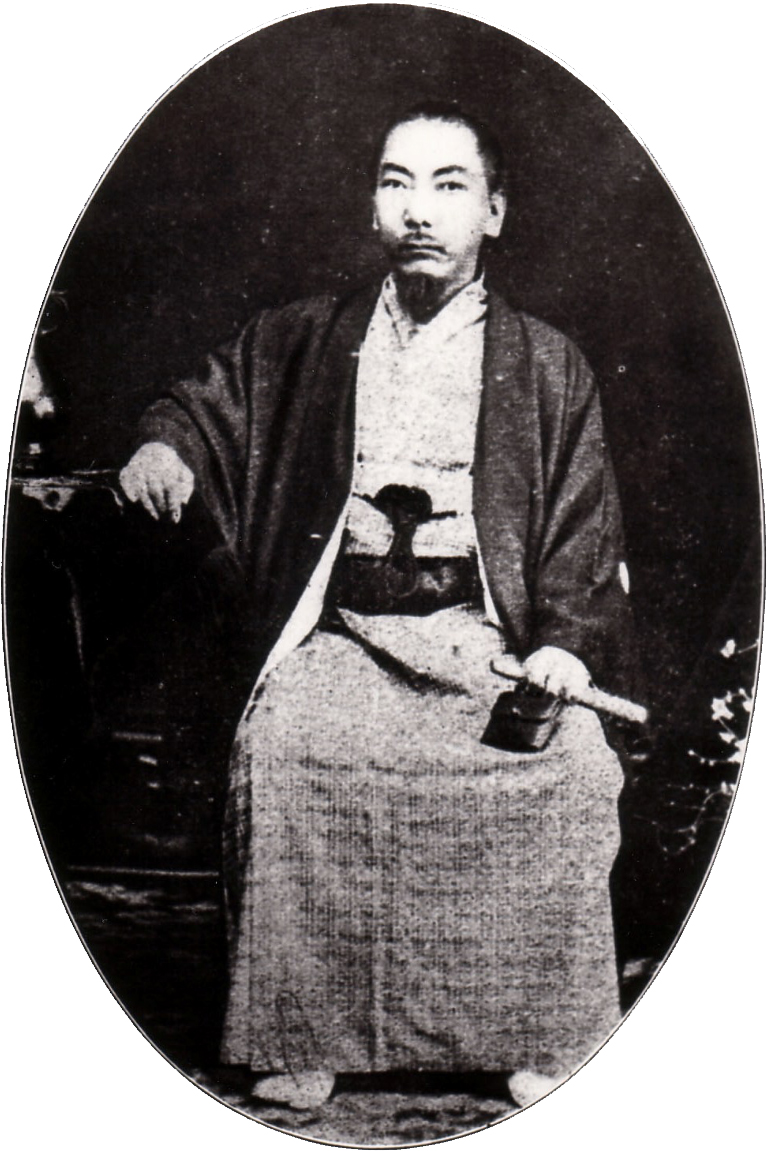
The last King Shō Tai

In 1429, King Shō Hashi completed the unification of the three kingdoms and founded the Ryūkyū Kingdom with its capital at Shuri Castle. His descendants conquered the Amami Islands. In 1469, King Shō Taikyū died, so the royal government chose a man named Kanemaru as the new king, who chose the name Shō En and established the Second Shō dynasty. His son Shō Shin conquered the Sakishima Islands and centralized the royal government, the military, and the noro priestesses.

=== Satsuma Domain ===
In 1609, the Japanese Satsuma Domain launched the invasion of Ryukyu, ultimately capturing the king and his capital after a long struggle. Ryukyu was forced to cede the Amami Islands and become a vassal of Satsuma. The kingdom became both a tributary of China and a tributary of Japan. Because China would not make a formal trade agreement unless a country was a tributary state, the kingdom was a convenient loophole for Japanese trade with China. When Japan officially closed off trade with European nations except for the Dutch, Nagasaki, Tsushima, and Kagoshima became the only Japanese trading ports offering connections with the outside world.

=== 18th and 19th centuries ===
Several Europeans visited Ryukyu starting in the late 18th century. The most important visits to Okinawa were from Captain Basil Hall in 1816 and Commodore Matthew C. Perry in 1852. A Christian missionary, Bernard Jean Bettelheim, lived in the Gokoku-ji temple in Naha from 1846 to 1854.

In 1879, Japan annexed the entire Ryukyu archipelago. The Meiji government then established Okinawa Prefecture. The monarchy in Shuri was abolished, and the deposed King Shō Tai was forced to relocate to Tokyo.

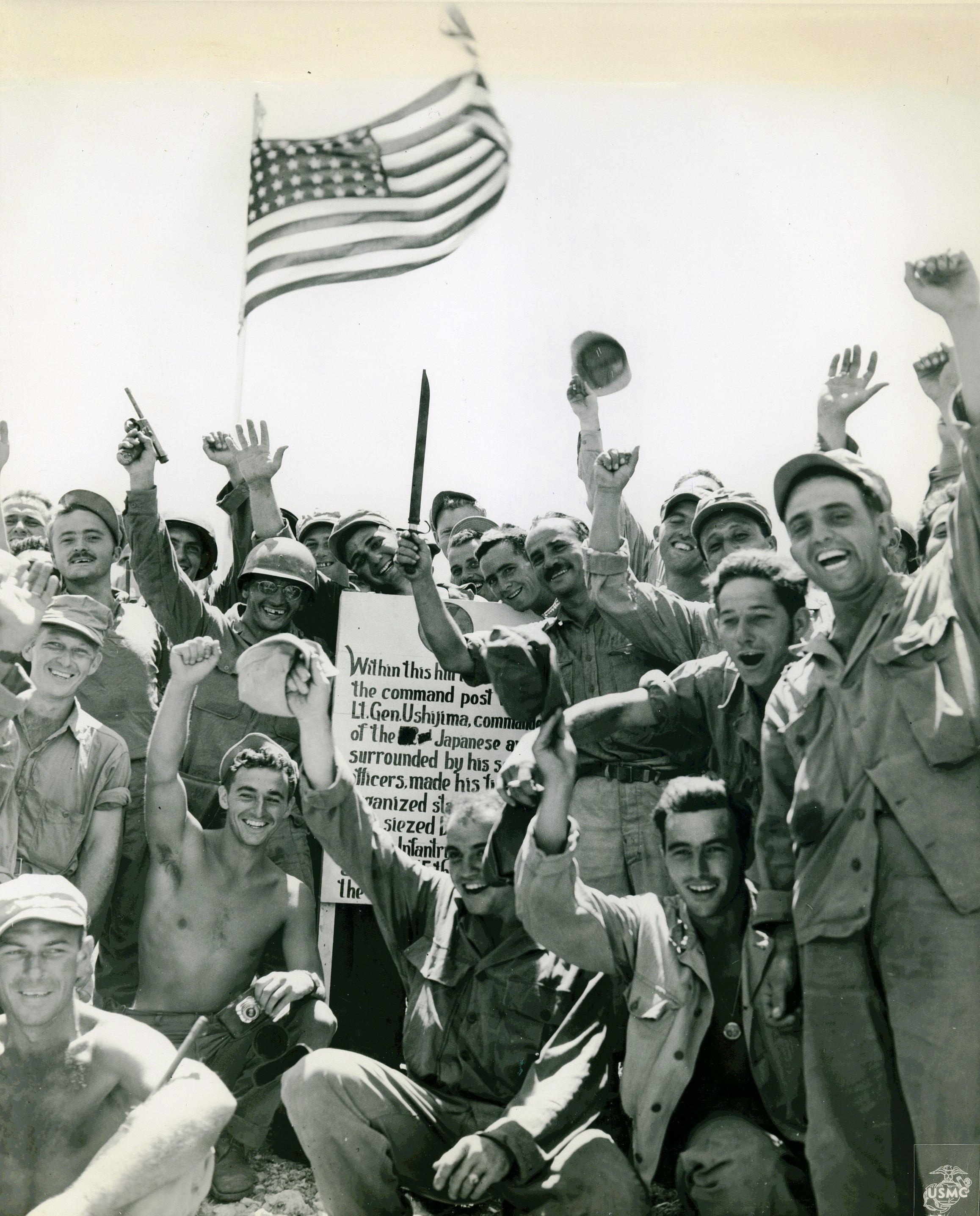
American troops in Okinawa, 27 June 1945

=== Pacific War ===
Okinawa Island had the bloodiest ground battle of the Pacific War from 1 April to 22 June 1945. During this 82-day-long battle, about 95,000 Imperial Japanese Army troops and 20,195 Americans were killed. The Cornerstone of Peace at the Peace Memorial Park in Itoman lists 149,193 persons from Okinawa—approximately one quarter of the civilian population—were either killed or committed suicide during the Battle of Okinawa and the Pacific War. Very few Japanese ended up in POW camps. This may have been because of Japanese soldiers' reluctance to surrender. The total number of casualties shocked American military strategists. This made them apprehensive to invade the other main islands of Japan, because it would result in very high casualties.

=== American occupation ===
Japan became a pacifist country with the 1947 constitution, so America decided to step into the role of protecting Japan against foreign threats. During the American military occupation of Japan (1945–1952), which followed the Imperial Japanese surrender on 2 September 1945, in Tokyo Bay, the United States controlled Okinawa Island and the rest of the Ryukyu Islands. The Amami Islands were returned to Japanese control in 1953. The remaining Ryukyu Islands were returned to Japan on 17 June 1971. America kept numerous U.S. military bases on the islands. There are 32 United States military bases on Okinawa Island by the U.S.-Japan alliance since 1951. U.S. bases on Okinawa played critical roles in the Korean War, Vietnam War, Laotian Civil War, Cambodian campaign, War in Afghanistan, and Iraq War. Okinawa served as a prime staging post for the aforementioned wars. Its ports and airports were used to transport supplies. The base at Camp Chinen, Nanjo City was used by the CIA for covert operations. In 1965, Admiral Ulysses S. Grant Sharp stated that "Without Okinawa, we couldn't continue fighting the Vietnam war."

Intense use of the island by the U.S. military caused damage to the environment and residents. There were oil and fuel spills. Exposure to toxic substances caused illness of service members such as a nerve agent leak in 1969. Aircraft crashes, hit-and runs and murders killed residents. The perpetrators were often unpunished, since they could not be prosecuted in Okinawa Courts. The 1970s and 1980s also had severe pollution of waterways and wells with PFAS: toxic chemicals in foam used by fire fighting training at U.S. facilities such as Kadena Air Base.

=== 1970s narcotics trade ===
In the early 1970s, according to a U.S. government report, Okinawa was a key conduit for smuggling drugs such as heroin from Thailand via Okinawa to the United States. It was called "The Okinawa System" in the global drug trade. A testimony by a head of the Department of Defense said that drug abuse was "quite extensive." It began in the second half of 1968; marijuana was smuggled from Thailand to Okinawa and grown near an unidentified U.S. Marine Corps training area in northern Okinawa. A 100 kg (220 lb) package of marijuana fell from an aircraft, and another 90 kg (200 lb) was discovered at a military post office. From the mid-1970s onwards, LSD and heroin became more prevalent. Deserters worked as "passport civilians" and smuggled the drugs into Okinawa. A lack of customs inspections made smuggling easy. There were well organized Ryukyuan smuggling rings who brought heroin, LSD, and marijuana to Okinawa, and produced LSD on the island.

=== 1995 rape incident ===
On 4 September 1995, two Marines by the names of Rodrico Harp and Kendrick Ledet, were convinced by Seaman Marcus Dion Gill to search for a local to abduct and rape. This resulted in them targeting a 12-year-old girl walking home alone in the town of Kin. After forcing the victim into a rental van, the trio drove to Blue Beach Training Ground where Gill beat her until she lost consciousness and then raped her. Once finished, he joked about the event with Ledet and Harp, who were alleged to have had reservations about going through with the rape after getting into the vehicle. After dumping her out of the van and driving off, the victim called the police immediately, who had little trouble tracking them down. As a result, the three would become the center of an internationally observed trial that ignited months of protest from anti-base Okinawans. At the conclusion of the trial, the three received sentences to serve between 6.5 and 7 years of hard labor. Although the typical sentence length for rape by Japanese standards at the time, the young victim and her family had begged the panel of judges to pass life sentences.

=== 21st century ===
In 2013, following escalating tensions following competing claims to the uninhabited Senkaku Islands, the People's Republic of China began questioning Japan's sovereignty to the island of Okinawa, citing its past as the independent tributary state of Ryukyu. On 31 October 2019, the main courtyard structures of Shurijo were destroyed in a fire. It marked the fifth time that Shurijo was destroyed following previous incidents in 1453, 1660, 1709 and 1945. The 2019 fire burned down sections of Shuri Castle: "Six castle buildings occupying some 4,200 square metres (45,000 sq ft) in total were gutted." Rebuilding efforts were underway as of 10 February 2020.

== Demographics ==
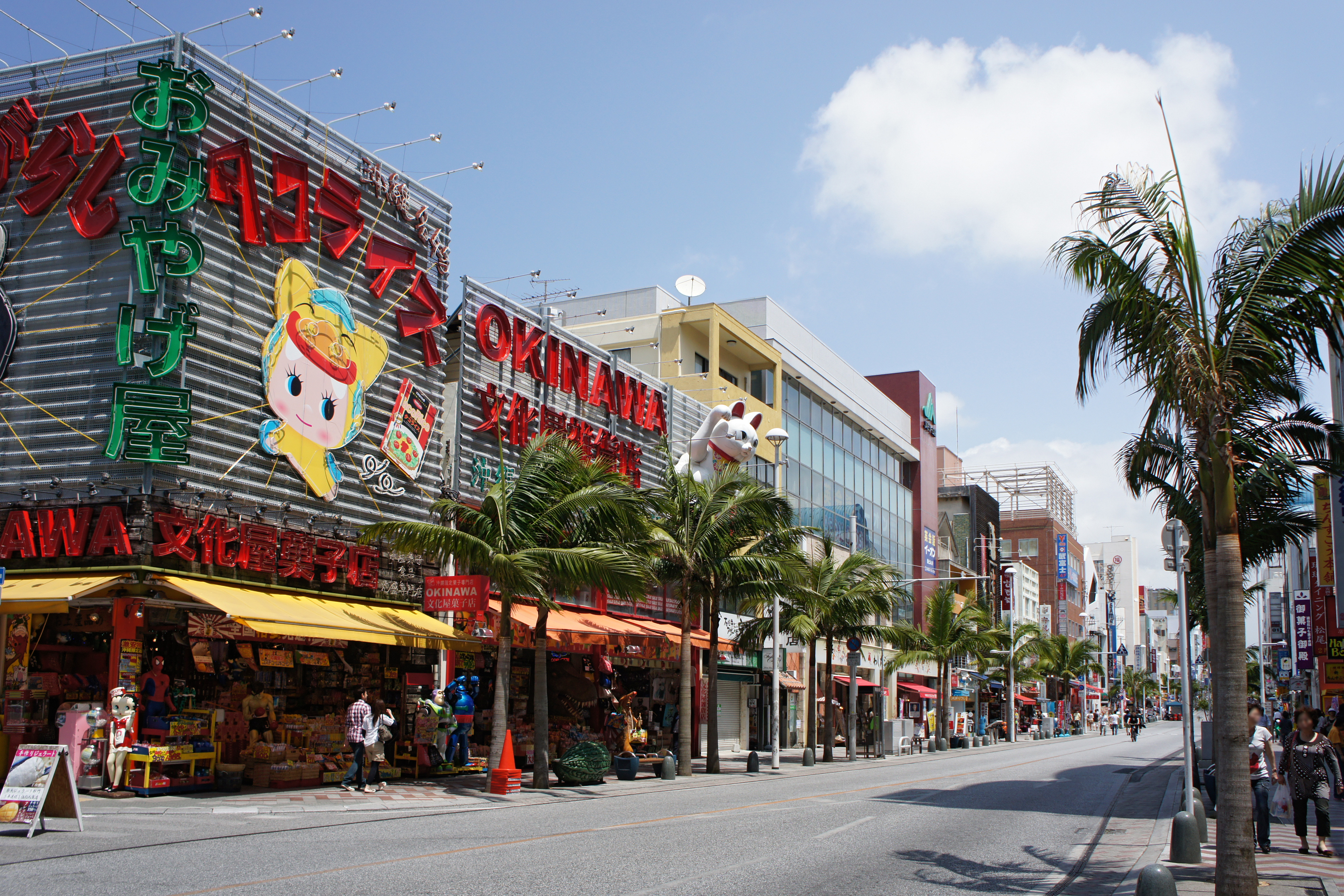
Kokusai Street in Naha

In September 2009, the Japanese government estimated the population to be 1,384,762, which included American military personnel and their families. The Okinawan language, called Uchināguchi, is spoken by adults only, but several local groups promote the use of the Okinawan language by younger people.

Whereas the northern half of Okinawa Island is sparsely populated, the south-central and southern parts of the island are markedly urbanized—particularly the city of Naha and the urban corridor stretching north from there to Okinawa City. The population distribution is approximately 120,000 in northern Okinawa, 590,000 in central Okinawa and 540,000 in southern Okinawa. It has a high population density of 1,014.93/km^{2}.

During the Meiji period, Okinawan ethnic identity, tradition, culture and language were suppressed by the Meiji government, which sought to assimilate the Okinawans as Japanese (Yamato). Many ethnic Japanese have since migrated to Okinawa. The modern inhabitants of Okinawa are mainly ethnic Okinawan, Japanese, half Japanese and mixed.

Okinawans are known for their longevity. This particular island is a so-called Blue Zone, an area where the people live longer than most others elsewhere in the world. Five times as many Okinawans reach 100 years old compared to the rest of Japan. As of 2002 there were 34.7 centenarians for every 100,000 inhabitants, which is the highest ratio worldwide. Possible explanations are diet, low-stress lifestyle, caring community, activity, and spirituality of the inhabitants of the island. The Okinawan diet consists of low-fat, low-salt foods, such as whole fruits and vegetables, legumes, tofu, and seaweed.

Japan is one of the most rapidly aging societies in the world, with declining fertility and increasing longevity contributing to an accelerating population contraction. National fertility has fallen to around 1.2, far below the replacement level of 2.15. Against this backdrop, Okinawa remains a demographic outlier. Its fertility rates, while below replacement, are significantly higher than those found in major metropolitan regions such as Tokyo, Osaka, and Kanagawa.

=== JC virus research study ===
In 1997, a scientific research study on the transmission of the ubiquitous JC virus (JCV) was conducted on the population of Okinawa due to the specific separation of Japanese and military populations on Okinawa. By the time of the study, researchers had identified multiple subtypes of JCV, each of which was generally associated with a specific geographic region or ancestral population. Most humans become infected with some subtype of JCV by age of 10 years. The study conjectured that transmission occurred through prolonged close contact within households, rather than between populations living in close proximity, as was the case for the Japanese population and the military personnel living on Okinawa. Specifically, the study looked for transmission from the American population to the Japanese population. The study found no evidence of Japanese children having the American JCV subtype. The researchers proposed a "horizontal transmission from parents to children during long-term cohabitation". As a result of the study, JCV subtype analysis is now used to determine human migration patterns, including the population history of the Jōmon people of Okinawa.

== Geography ==
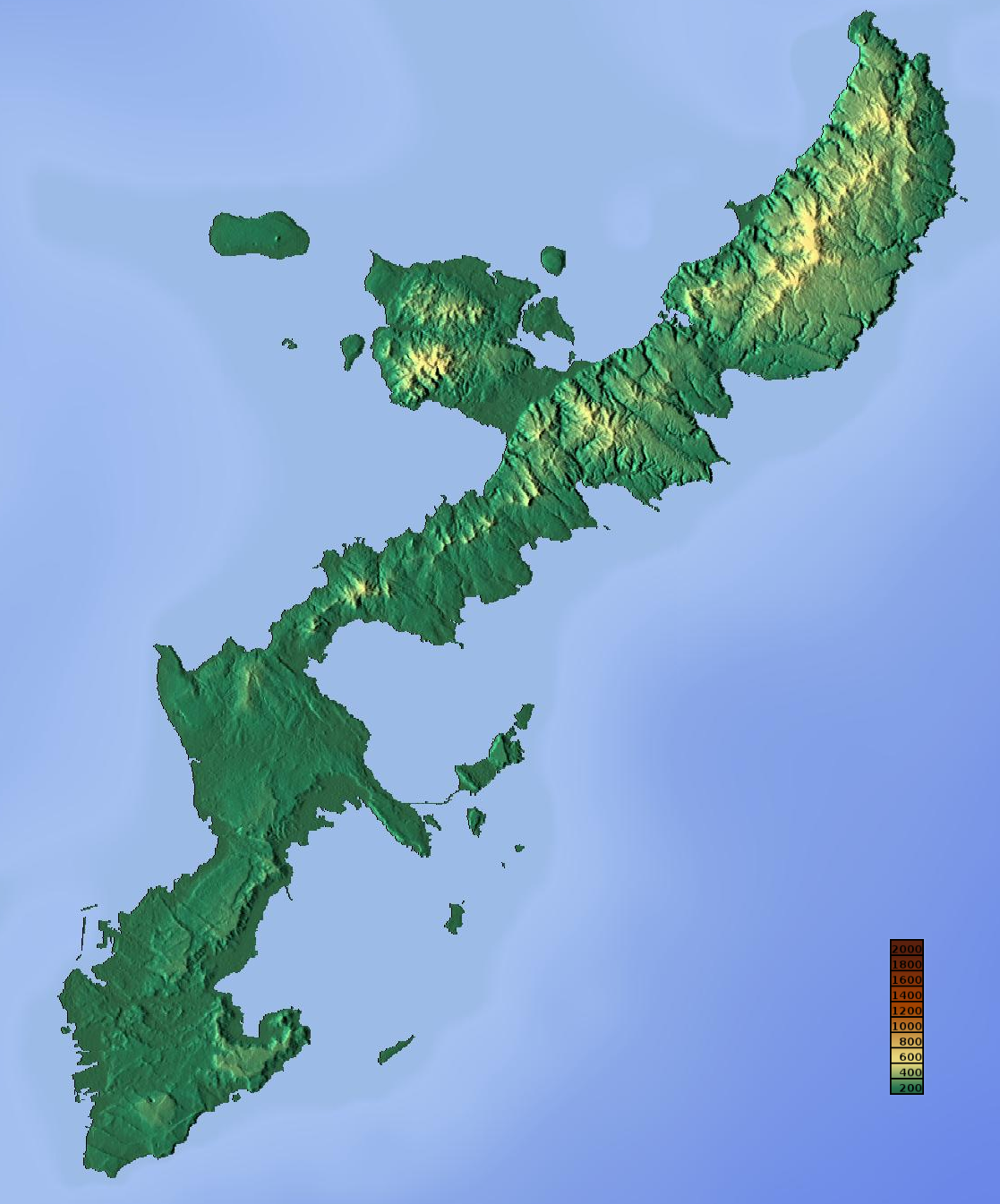
Topographic map of Okinawa Island

Okinawa is the fifth largest island of Japan. The island has an area of 1,206.99 square kilometers (466.02 sq mi). The coastline is 476 kilometers (296 mi) long. The straight-line distance is about 106.6 kilometers (66.2 mi) from north to south. Okinawa is in the northeastern end of Okinawa Prefecture. Since 1972 over 1,000 hectares (2,500 acres) of land has been added via reclamation (0.83% of the island's total area).

It is roughly 640 kilometres (400 mi) south of the main island of Kyushu. Okinawa is connected to nearby islands near a land bridge: Katsuren Peninsula is connected via the Mid-Sea Road to Henza Island, Miyagi Island, Ikei Island, and Hamahiga Island. Similarly, from the Motobu Peninsula on the northwestern side, all of Sesoko-jima plus Yagaji Island and Kōri-jima are connected by bridges. Okinawa Island has several beaches such as Manza Beach, Emerald Beach, Okuma Beach, Zanpa Beach, Moon Beach and Sunset Beach (Chatan-cho). Mount Omoto, at 525.5 m (1,724 ft), is the highest mountain in Okinawa, with Mount Yonaha being the second highest.

=== Geology ===
The Motobu Peninsula in the north has limestone layers and karst development. In the center and south is mainly a Ryukyu limestone layer and mudstone. The topography is flat, there are few hills over 100 m (328 ft) with very few rivers. The subtropical rains accelerate erosion requiring many drainages and uvala. The southern end of the island consists of uplifted coral reef, whereas the northern half has proportionally more igneous rock. The easily eroded limestone of the south has many caves, the most famous of which is Gyokusendō in Nanjō. The northernmost Cape Hedo is only 22 km (14 mi) away from Yoronjima. Cape Arasaki is the southernmost location of Okinawa island. It is sometimes confused with Cape Kiyanmisaki.

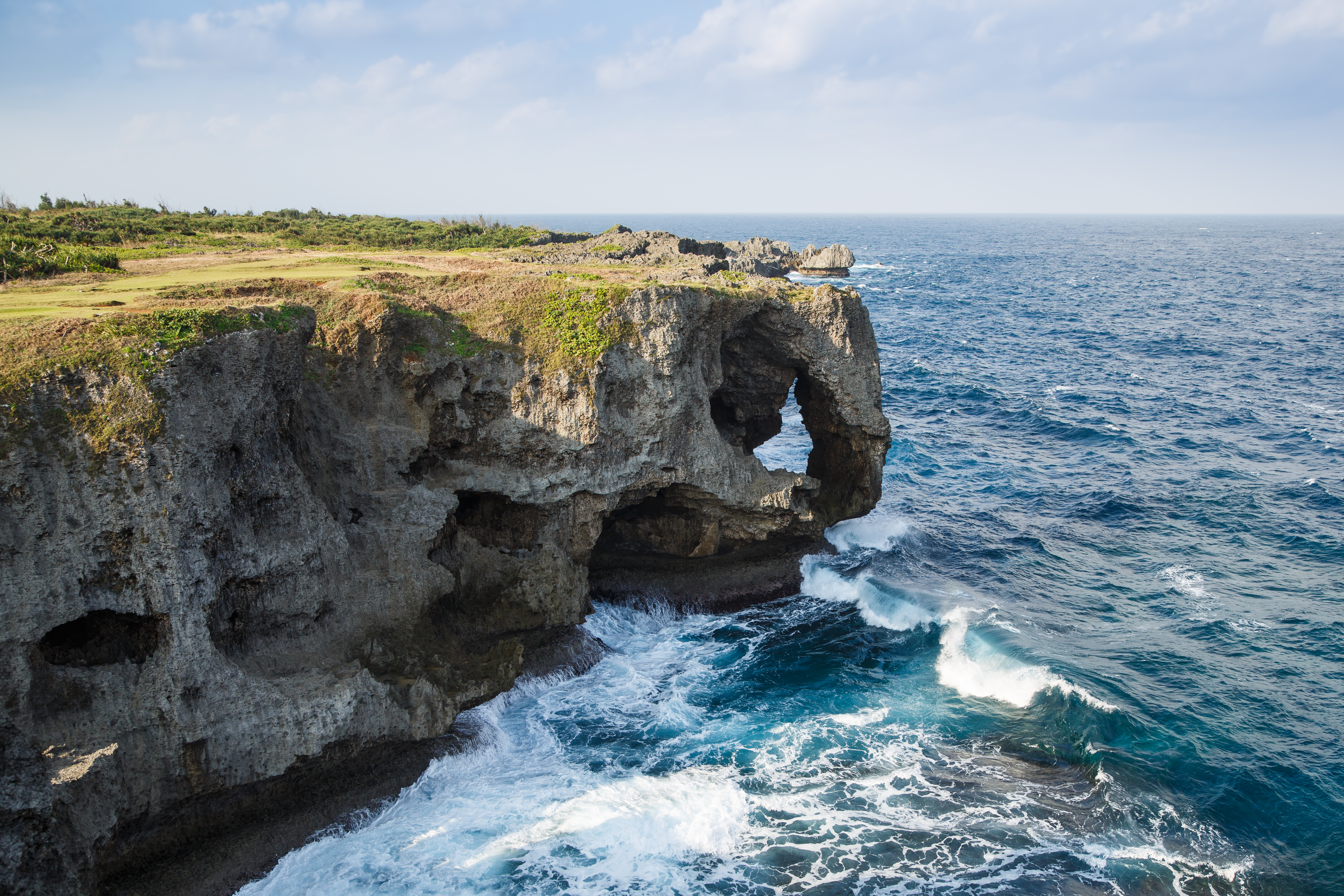
Cliffs at Manzamo

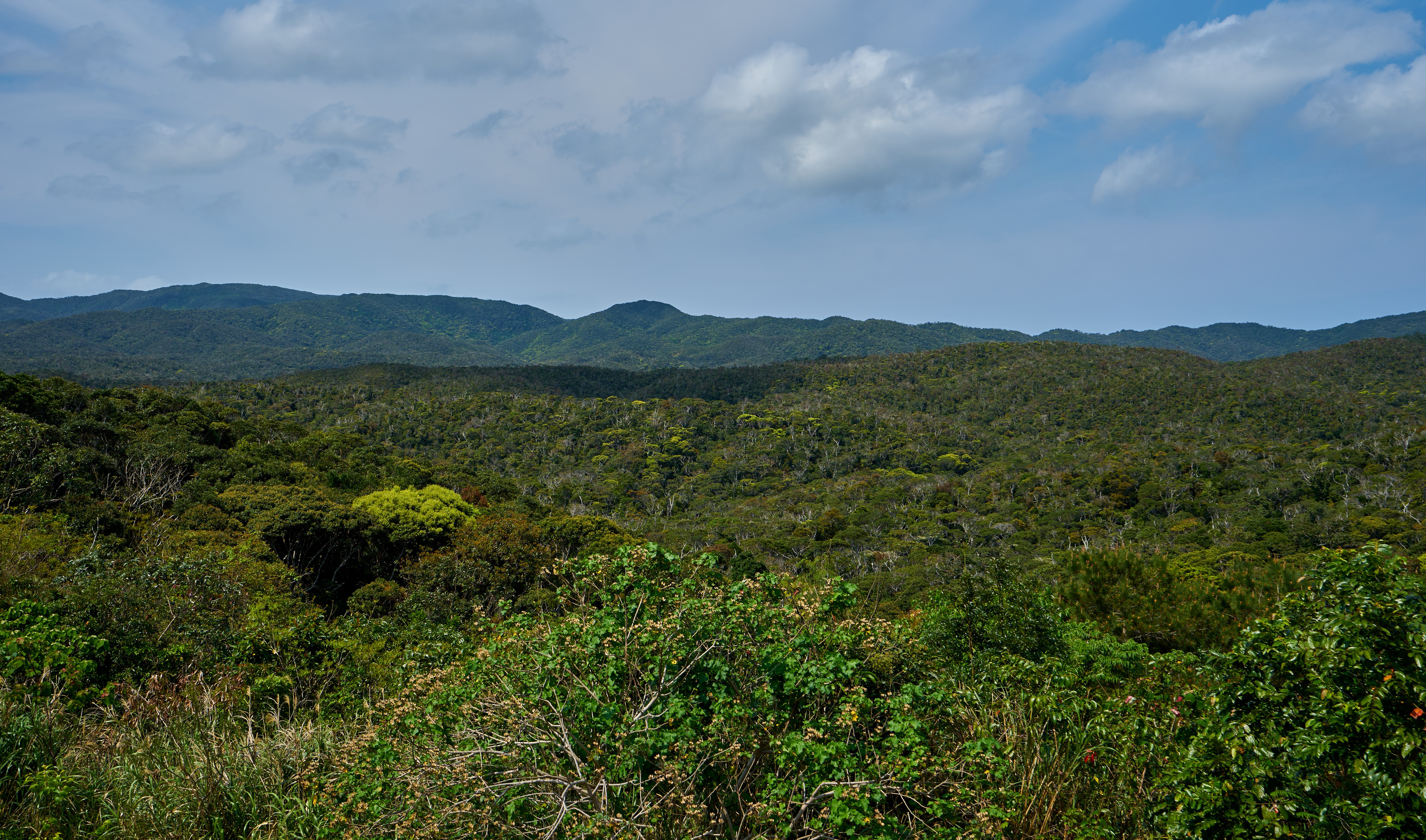
Subtropical forest of Yanbaru National Park

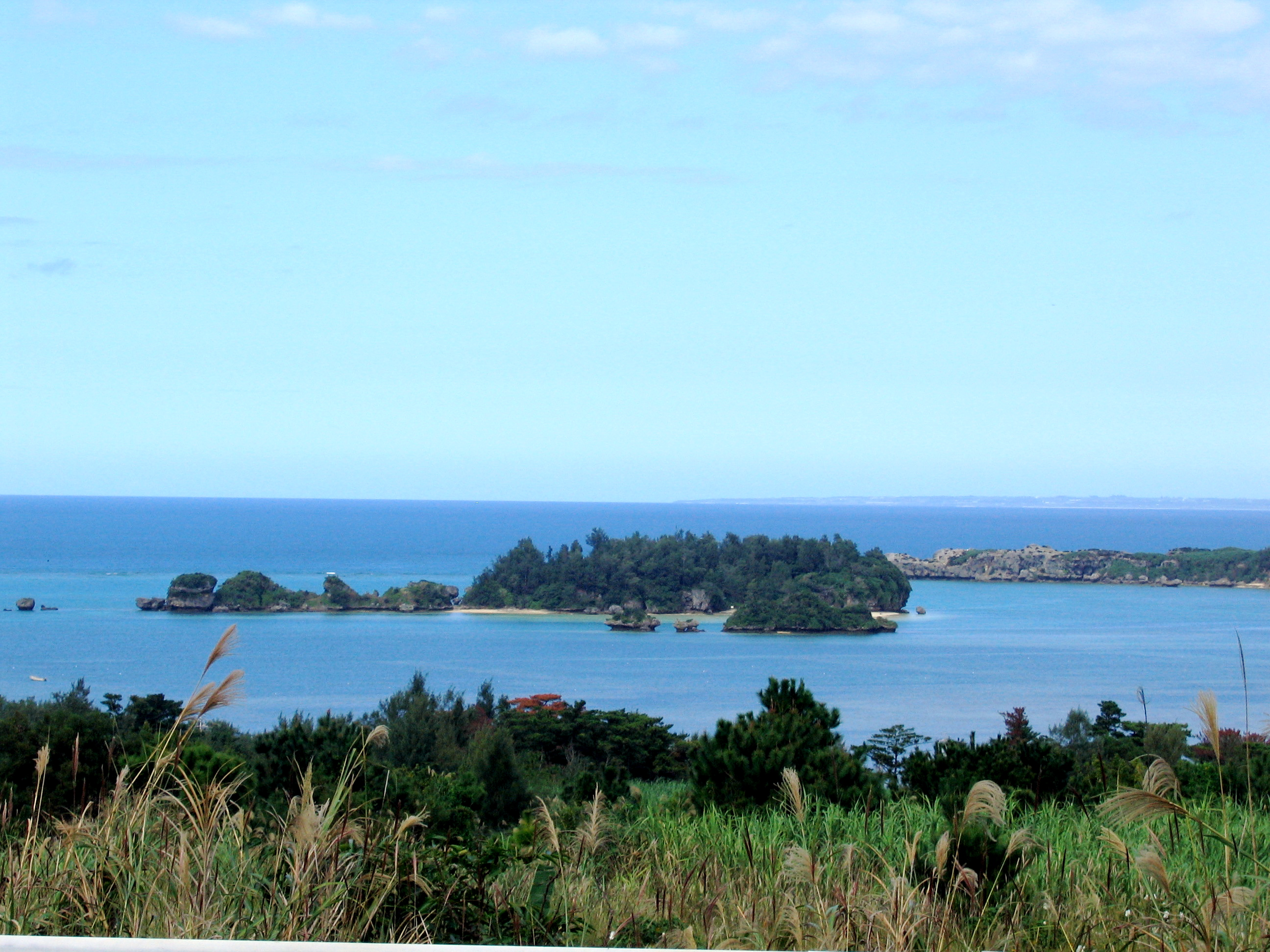
Village of Onna

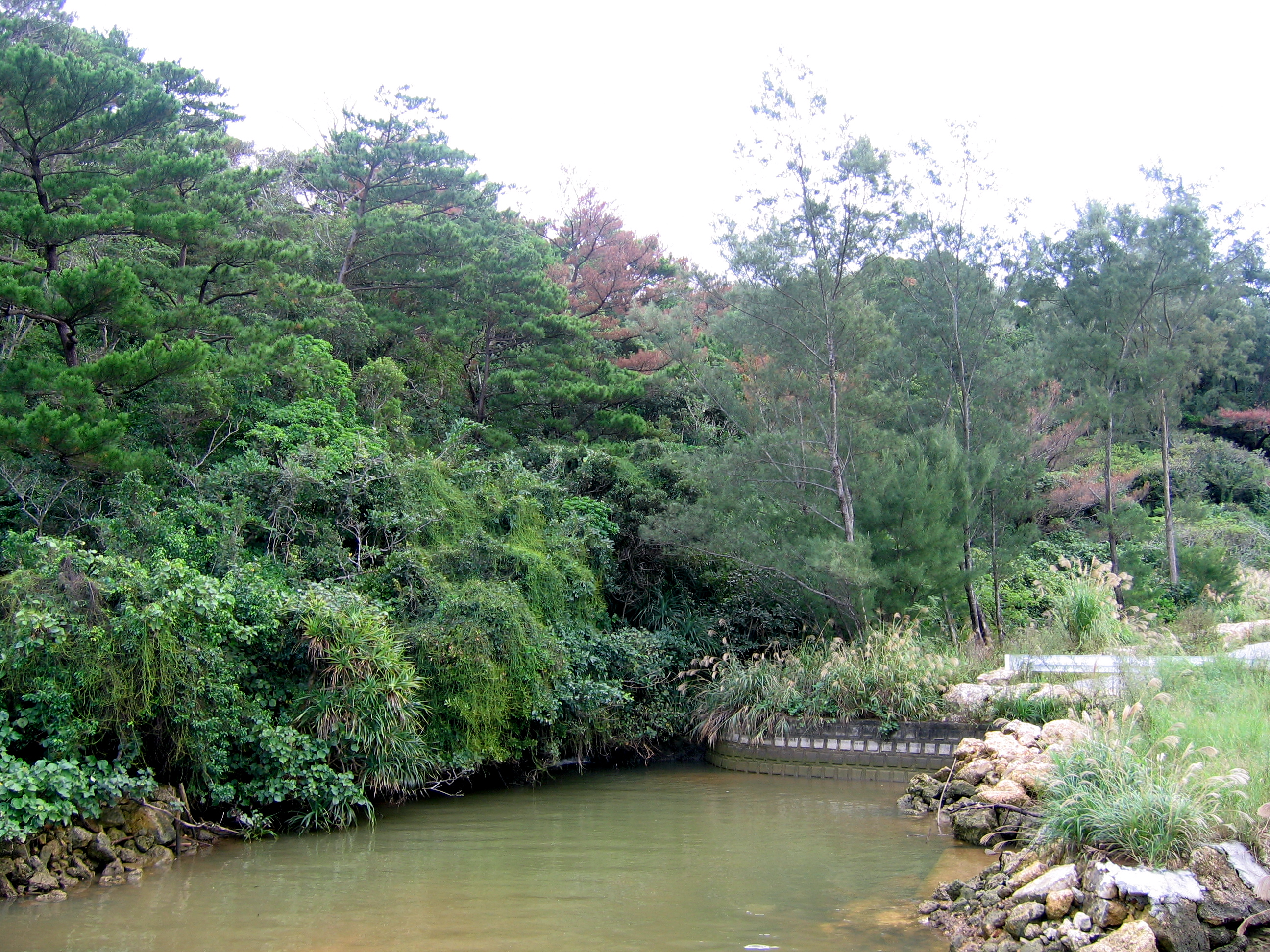
A pond in Okinawa

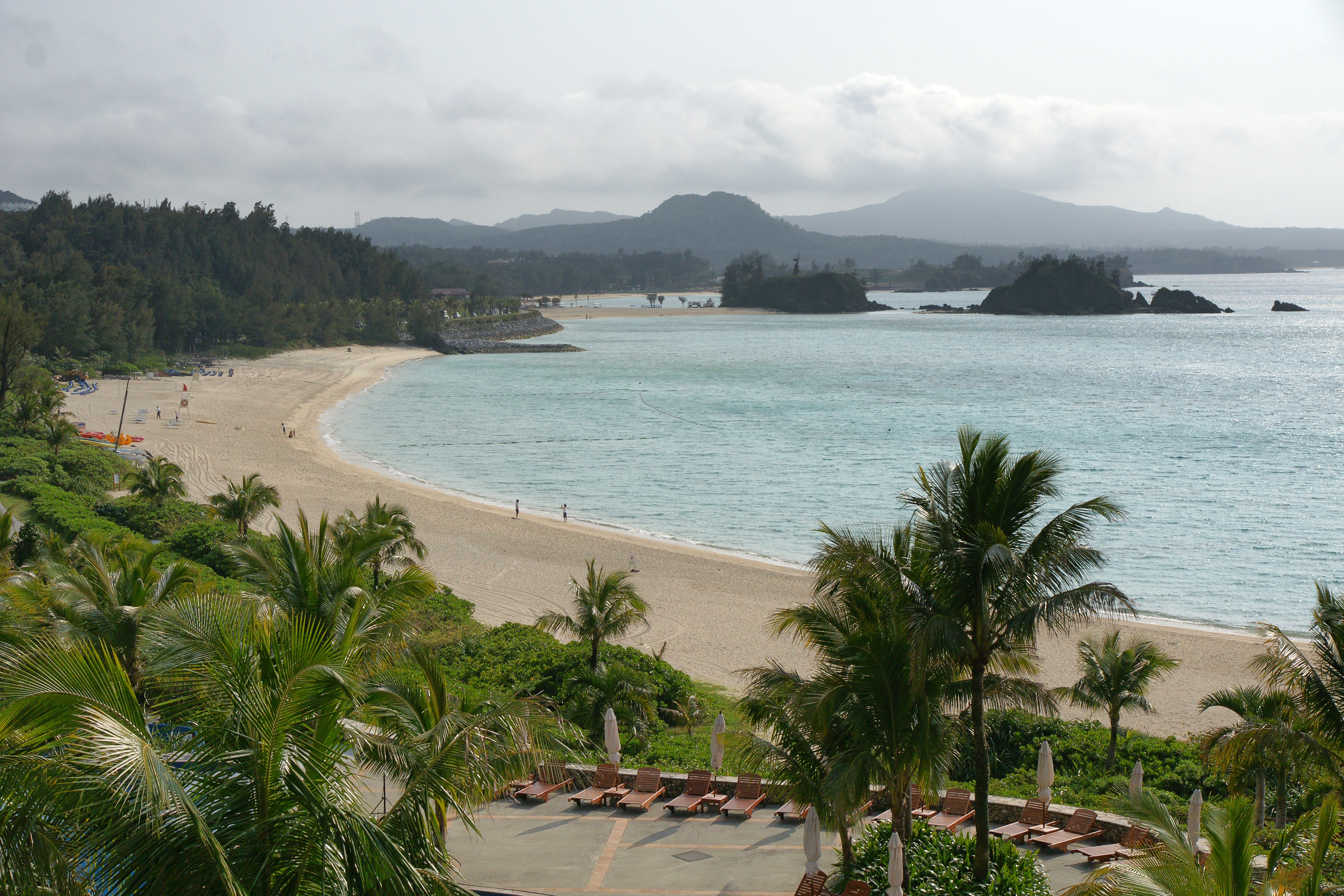
Cape Busena, in Nago, Okinawa

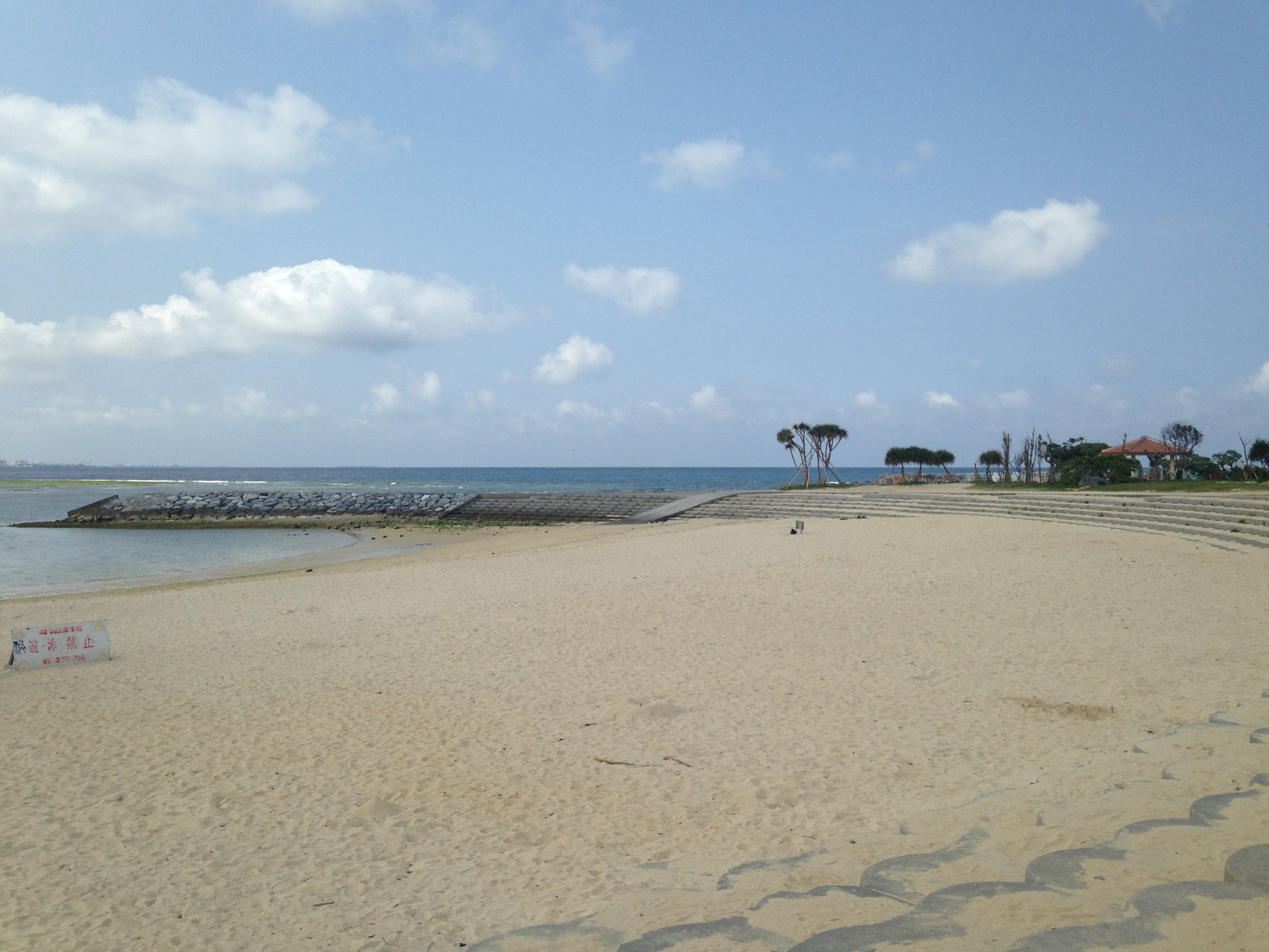
Sunset Beach (Chatan-cho)

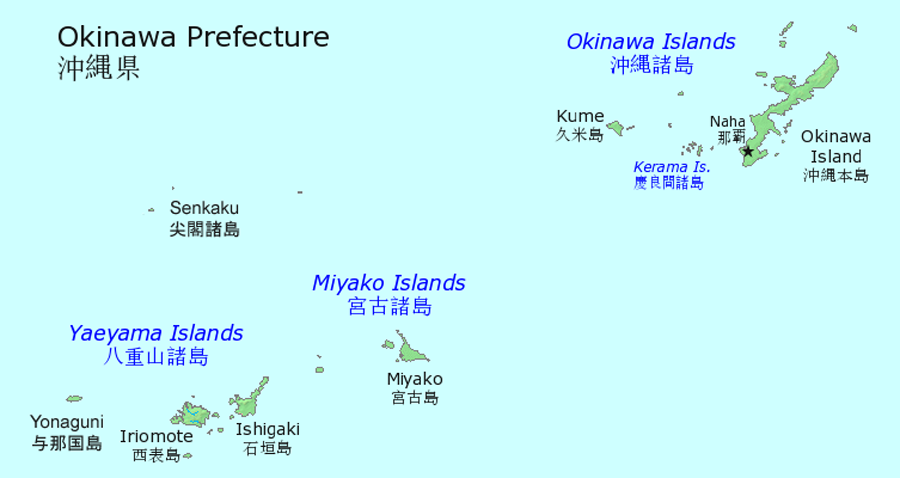
Map of Okinawa Prefecture with the location of Okinawa Island

=== Flora and fauna ===
The northern half of Okinawa has one of the largest tracts of subtropical rainforest in Asia called the Yanbaru. There are many endemic species of flora and fauna. There are a small number of endemic Yanbaru kuina (also known as the Okinawa rail), a small flightless bird that is close to extinction. The critically endangered Okinawa woodpecker is also endemic to the island. The Indian mongoose was introduced to the island to prevent the native habu pit viper from attacking the birds. It did not succeed in eliminating the habu but instead preyed on birds, increasing the threat to the Okinawa rail.

The coconut crab is the largest terrestrial hermit crab of Okinawa and the Ryukyu Islands. It is an endangered species due to over-hunting, which has made them scarce on Okinawa island. In 2021, coconut crabs were found to live in a small cave system on the islet Nagashima off the Henoko district.

A small population of endangered dugongs lives around Okinawa. The estimates are between 3 and 50 survivors.

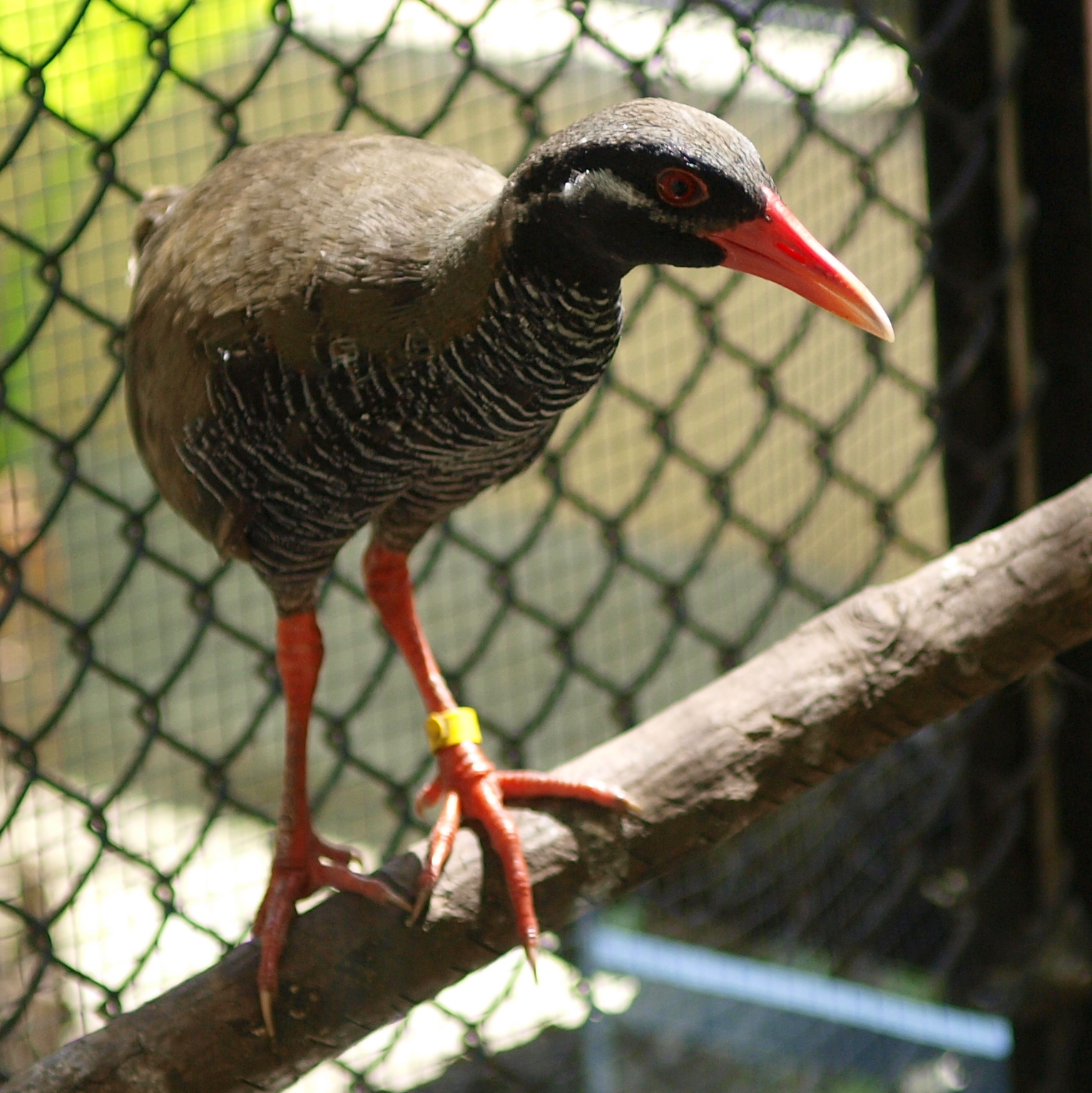
The Okinawa rail

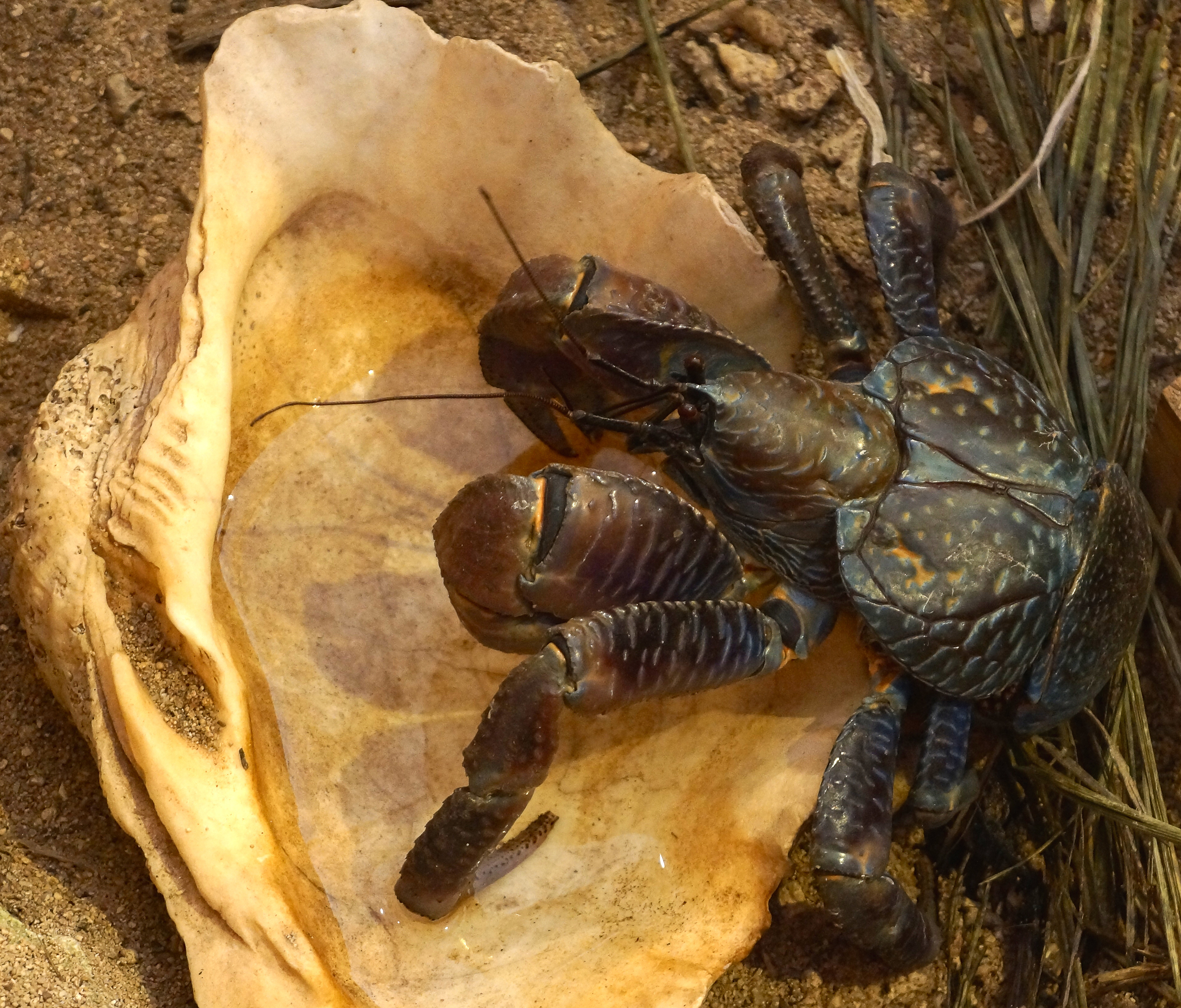
Coconut crab

=== Climate ===
The island has a humid subtropical climate bordering on a tropical rainforest climate. The climate supports a dense Subtropical forest in the northern Yanbaru National Park. A rainy season occurs in the late spring.

Climate data for Naha (1991–2020 normals, extremes 1890–present)
| Month | Jan | Feb | Mar | Apr | May | Jun | Jul | Aug | Sep | Oct | Nov | Dec | Year |
|---|---|---|---|---|---|---|---|---|---|---|---|---|---|
| Record high °C (°F) | 27.0 (80.6) | 27.1 (80.8) | 28.2 (82.8) | 30.6 (87.1) | 32.0 (89.6) | 34.3 (93.7) | 35.5 (95.9) | 35.6 (96.1) | 34.6 (94.3) | 33.0 (91.4) | 31.6 (88.9) | 29.4 (84.9) | 35.6 (96.1) |
| Mean daily maximum °C (°F) | 19.8 (67.6) | 20.2 (68.4) | 21.9 (71.4) | 24.3 (75.7) | 27.0 (80.6) | 29.8 (85.6) | 31.9 (89.4) | 31.8 (89.2) | 30.6 (87.1) | 28.1 (82.6) | 25.0 (77.0) | 21.5 (70.7) | 26.0 (78.8) |
| Daily mean °C (°F) | 17.3 (63.1) | 17.5 (63.5) | 19.1 (66.4) | 21.5 (70.7) | 24.2 (75.6) | 27.2 (81.0) | 29.1 (84.4) | 29.0 (84.2) | 27.9 (82.2) | 25.5 (77.9) | 22.5 (72.5) | 19.0 (66.2) | 23.3 (73.9) |
| Mean daily minimum °C (°F) | 14.9 (58.8) | 15.1 (59.2) | 16.7 (62.1) | 19.1 (66.4) | 22.1 (71.8) | 25.2 (77.4) | 27.0 (80.6) | 26.8 (80.2) | 25.8 (78.4) | 23.5 (74.3) | 20.4 (68.7) | 16.8 (62.2) | 21.1 (70.0) |
| Record low °C (°F) | 6.1 (43.0) | 4.9 (40.8) | 6.3 (43.3) | 8.7 (47.7) | 11.0 (51.8) | 14.8 (58.6) | 20.8 (69.4) | 20.7 (69.3) | 17.0 (62.6) | 14.8 (58.6) | 8.6 (47.5) | 6.8 (44.2) | 4.9 (40.8) |
| Average precipitation mm (inches) | 101.6 (4.00) | 114.5 (4.51) | 142.8 (5.62) | 161.0 (6.34) | 245.3 (9.66) | 284.4 (11.20) | 188.1 (7.41) | 240.0 (9.45) | 275.2 (10.83) | 179.2 (7.06) | 119.1 (4.69) | 110.0 (4.33) | 2,161 (85.08) |
| Average snowfall cm (inches) | 0 (0) | 0 (0) | 0 (0) | 0 (0) | 0 (0) | 0 (0) | 0 (0) | 0 (0) | 0 (0) | 0 (0) | 0 (0) | 0 (0) | 0 (0) |
| Average precipitation days (≥ 0.5 mm) | 12.2 | 11.3 | 12.6 | 11.6 | 13.1 | 12.4 | 11.0 | 13.9 | 13.3 | 10.6 | 9.6 | 10.7 | 142.0 |
| Average relative humidity (%) | 66 | 69 | 71 | 75 | 78 | 83 | 78 | 78 | 75 | 72 | 69 | 67 | 73 |
| Mean monthly sunshine hours | 93.1 | 93.1 | 115.3 | 120.9 | 138.2 | 159.5 | 227.0 | 206.3 | 181.3 | 163.3 | 121.7 | 107.4 | 1,727.1 |
Source: Japan Meteorological Agency

== Cuisine ==
There are many local pubs (izakaya) and cafes that serve Okinawan cuisine and dishes, such as gōyā chanpurū (bitter melon stir fry), fu chanpurū (wheat gluten chanpurū), and tonkatsu (tenderized, breaded, fried pork cutlet). Okinawan soba is the signature dish and consists of wheat noodles served hot in a soup, usually with pork (rib or pork belly). This contrasts with the mainland soba, which is buckwheat noodles. Rafute, which is braised pork belly, is another popular Okinawan dish. American presence on the island has also led to some creative dishes such as taco rice, which is now a common meal served in bentos, and the common use of Spam.

== Economy ==
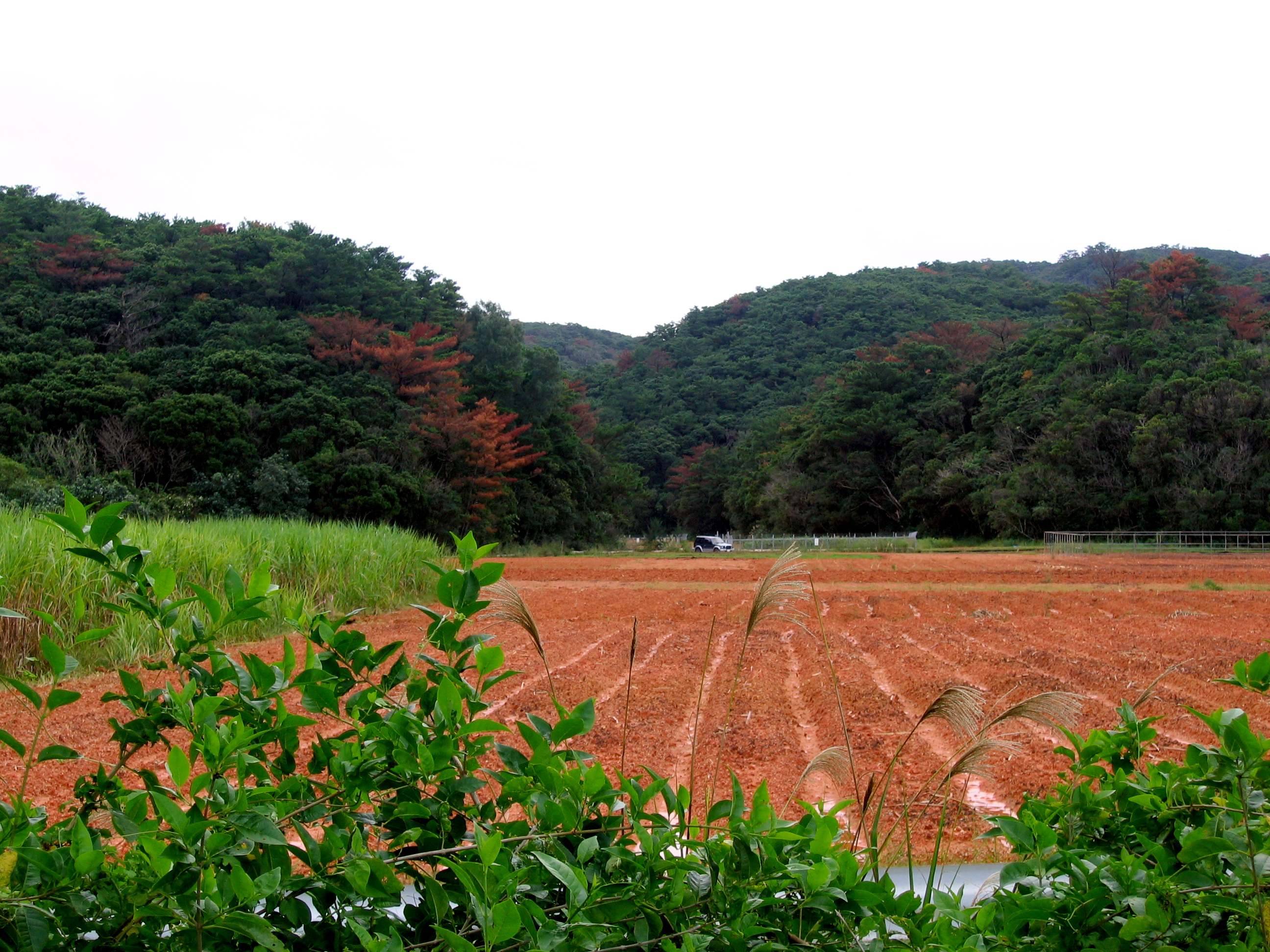
Farmland in Okinawa

Among the prefectures of Japan, Okinawa has the youngest and fastest-growing population but has the lowest employment rate and average income. The island economy is primarily driven by tourism and the U.S. military presence, with efforts in recent years to diversify into other sectors.

Other significant contributors to the economy include public utilities and public works, as well as, to a lesser extent, telecommunications (Okinawa Cellular Telephone), and alcoholic beverages (Orion Breweries).

The Motobu Peninsula has a large-scale quarry and cement factory, taking advantage of the limestone in the area. There is also agriculture with tropical fruit such as Malpighia emarginata.

=== Tourism ===
Tourist attractions include Okinawa Churaumi Aquarium (at one time the world's largest aquarium), Century Beach, Pineapple Park, the Orion Beer Factory and Hiji Falls. In recent years, Okinawa has become an increasingly popular destination for tourists from China and Southeast Asia. In 2018, Okinawa attracted 9,842,400 tourists, a positive growth of 4.7% from 9,396,200 in the previous year.

=== Military bases ===
The U.S. military bases account for 4 to 5% of the island economy. There is also a smaller contingent of Japanese military bases on the island. Several former U.S. military facilities on Okinawa have been re-developed as commercial areas, most notably the American Village in Chatan, which opened in 1998, and the Aeon Mall Okinawa Rycom in Kitanakagusuku, which opened in 2015.

== U.S. military in Okinawa ==
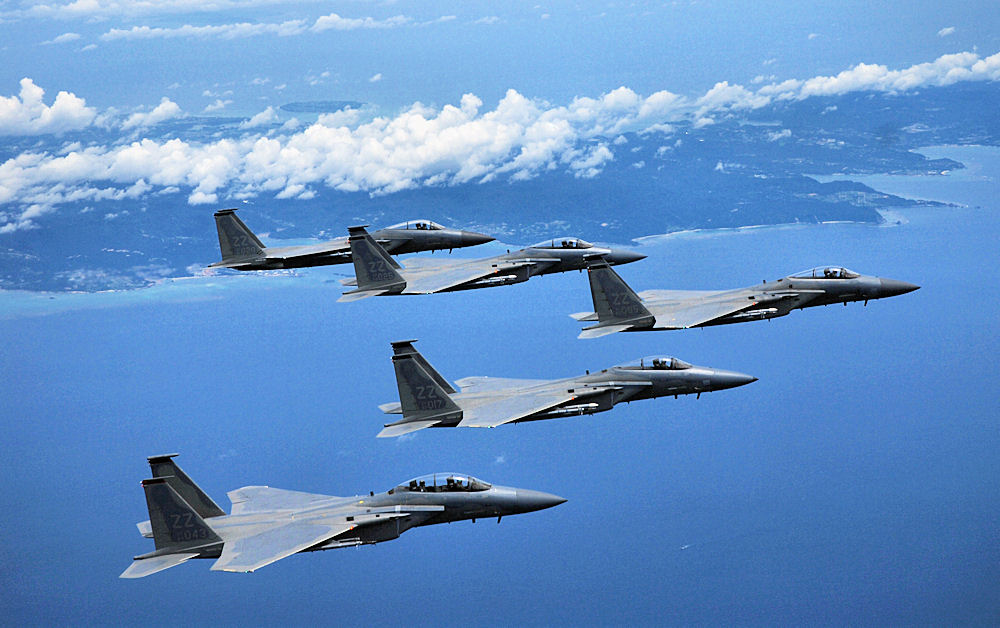
F-15C Eagles and an F-15D of the 18th Wing, Kadena Air Base

U.S. military bases in Okinawa (2010)

The United States maintains American military bases in Japan as part of the U.S.-Japan alliance since 1951. As of December 2024, there were just over 60,000 U.S. military and civilian personnel in Japan — 53,603 active-duty U.S., 397 reserve troops, and 7,049 civilian personnel employed by the U.S. Defense Department. In addition, there are approximately 35,000 U.S. dependents in Japan. Most U.S. military is in Okinawa Prefecture.

There are 120 active U.S. military bases in Japan, with about 70% being in or around Okinawa. They cover 25% of the island. The major bases are Futenma, Kadena, Hansen, Torii, Schwab, Foster, and Kinser. There are 28 U.S. military facilities on Okinawa. They are mainly concentrated in the central area. At one point, Okinawa hosted approximately 1,200 nuclear warheads. There were several nuclear weapons incidents on Okinawa and in the sea near the islands.

=== Pollution ===
In 2020, tests around Kadena Air Base showed severe contamination of the wells and waterways of Dakujaku River and Hija river with toxic chemicals PFAS. This affects the drinking water of 450,000 residents. PFAS was used in foam at fire fighting training sites on U.S. facilities during the 1970s and 1980s.

=== Moving the bases ===
The 1971 Okinawa Reversion Agreement officially ended the U.S. military occupation on Okinawa. The bases primarily exist to serve Japanese and American strategic interests, despite recent efforts to move the bases out of core areas following incidents involving military personnel and resultant protests (including the 1995 Okinawa rape incident).

In 2012, an agreement was struck between the United States and Japan to reduce the number of U.S. military personnel on the island, moving 9,000 personnel to other locations and moving bases out of heavily populated Greater Naha, but 10,000 Marines will remain on the island, along with other U.S. military units. Attempts to completely close bases on the southern third of the island, where 90% of the population lives (all but about 120,000 people) have been impeded by both the American desire that alternative locations be found where bases subject to closure could move to (e.g. Henoko Peninsula, mid-island), as well as by local Okinawan opposition to any suggested locations on the island (who demand no U.S. troops at all anywhere on the island). Tokyo says the U.S. bases are important for national security. Locals complain that despite being home to less than 1% of Japan's population and area, Okinawa hosts the majority of the U.S. military presence in Japan. In late December 2013, Governor Hirokazu Nakaima gave permission for land reclamation to begin for a new U.S. military base at Henoko, reneging on previous promises and furthering the effort to consolidate the American troop presence on the island, though away from urban Naha.

In December 2016 the U.S. returned 10,000 acres (40 km^{2}; 16 sq mi) of the Northern Training Area on Okinawa to Japan. This reduced the footprint of the U.S. forces by 20% on the island. It was the biggest land return since 1972.

== Architecture ==
Okinawa has various historical buildings and monuments, such as feudal castles, ruins, UNESCO, and other historical significant sites.

- Shuri Castle is the most famous castle on Okinawa and a UNESCO World Heritage Site.
- Nakagusuku Castle is a gusuku in the village of Kitanakagusuku, Okinawa. This is a UNESCO World Heritage Site and one of the 100 most famous castles in Japan.
- The Cornerstone of Peace monument in Itoman commemorates the Battle of Okinawa and the end of World War II. Nearby is the Okinawa Prefectural Peace Memorial Museum.
- Nakamura House is an original 18th-century farmhouse in Kitanakagusuki.
- The former Japanese Navy Underground HQ
- Katsuren Castle
- Nakijin Castle
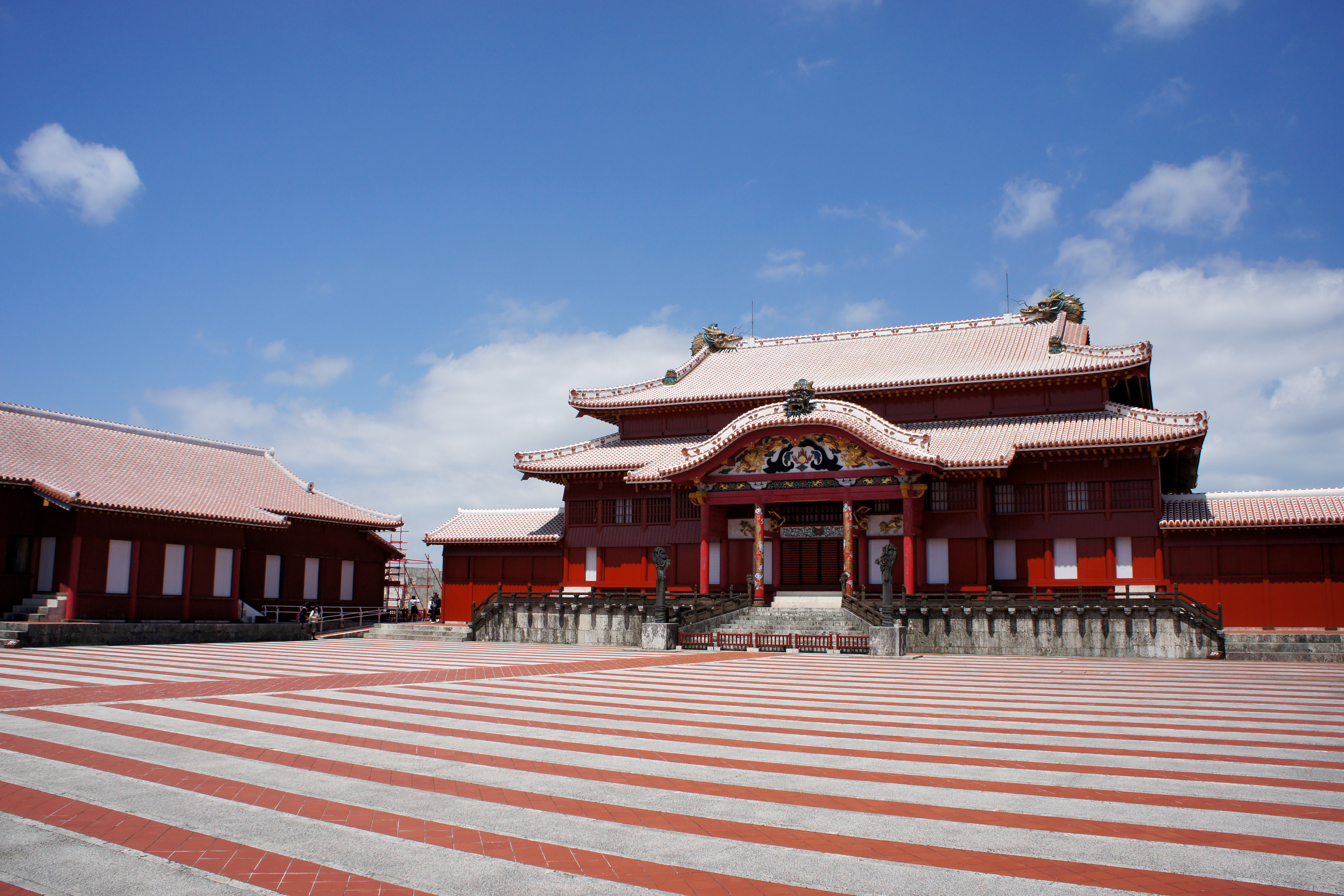
Shuri Castle in Naha

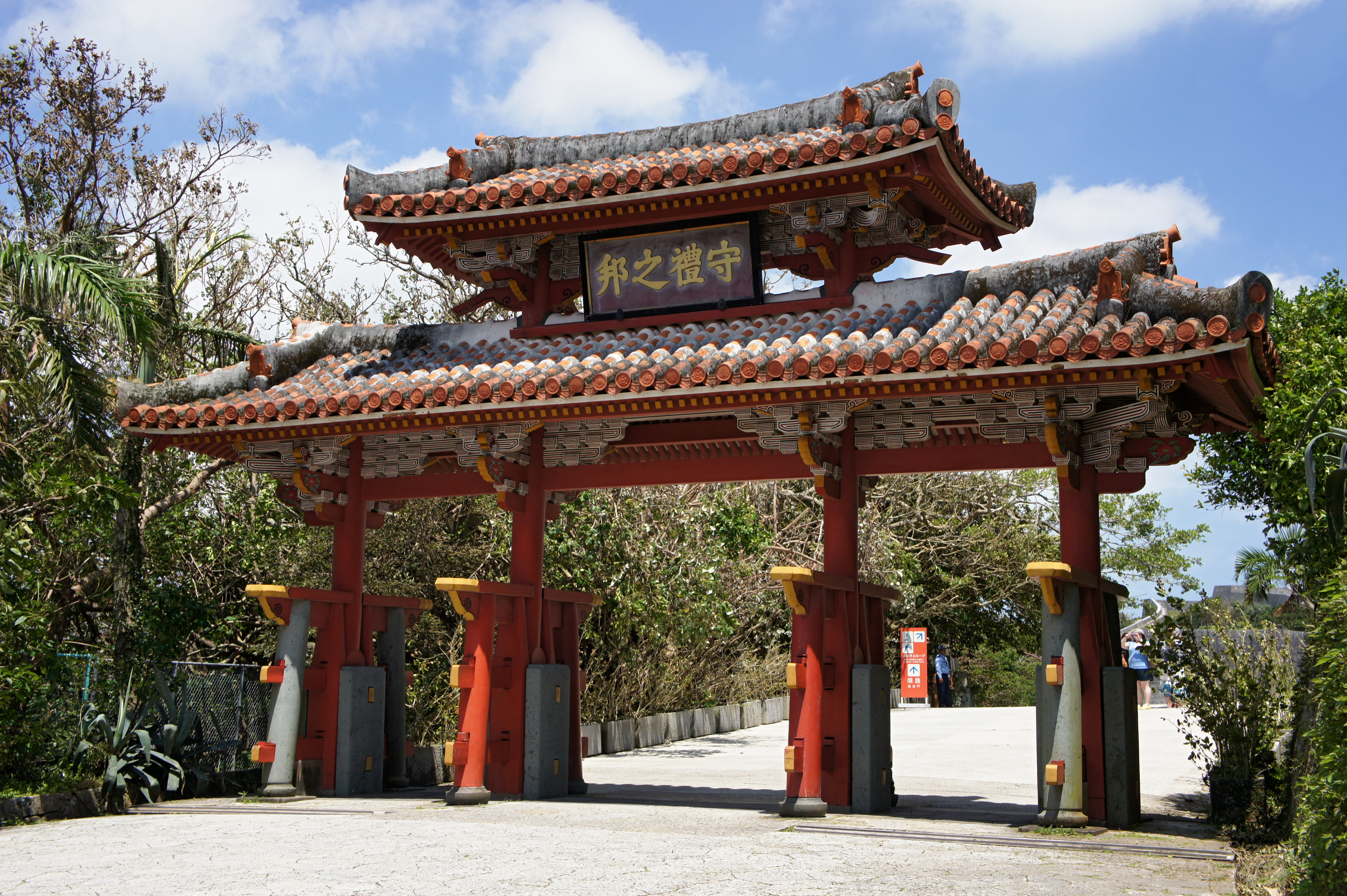
Shureimon

Nakagusuku Castle ruins

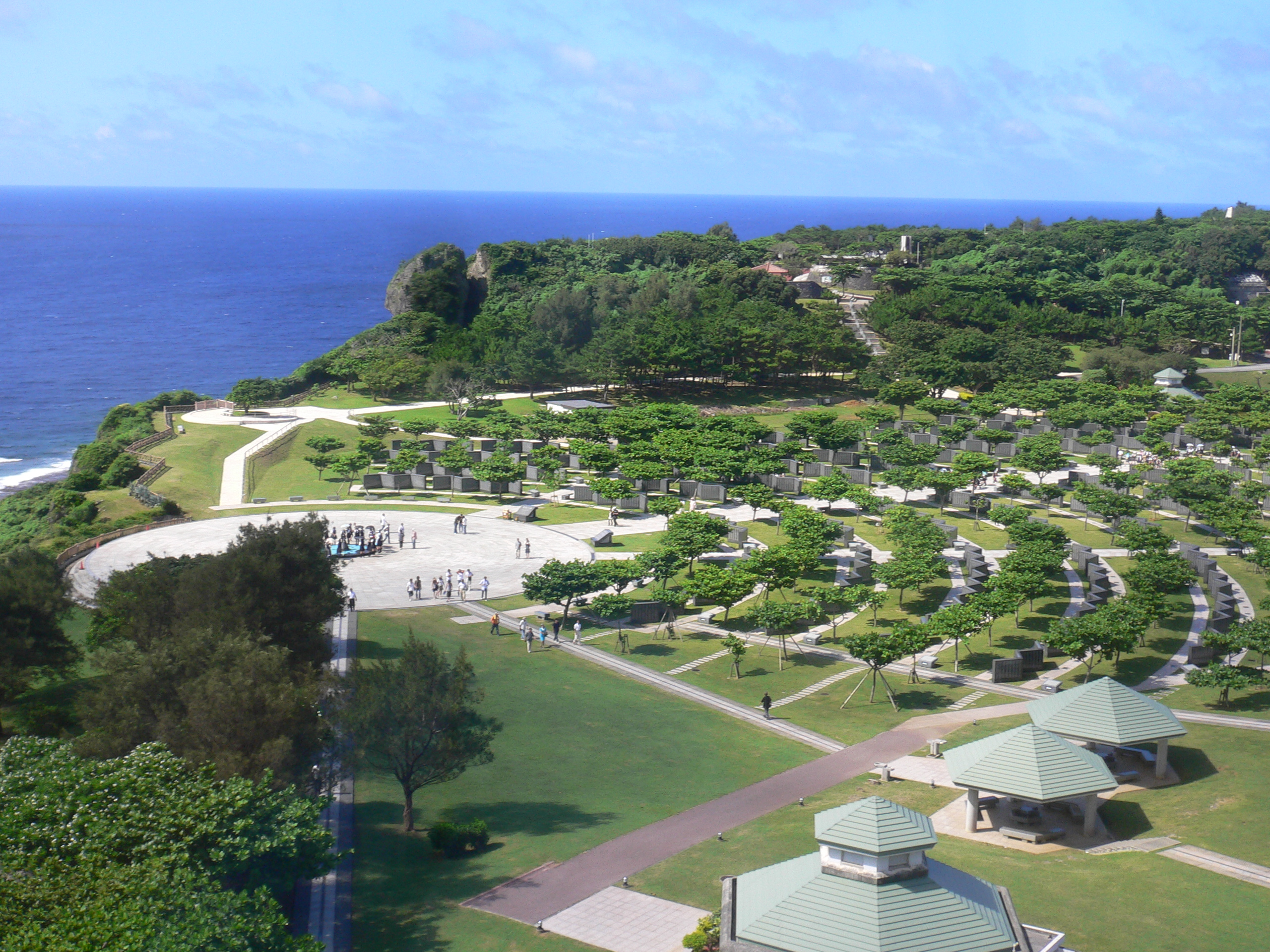
Cornerstone of Peace monument

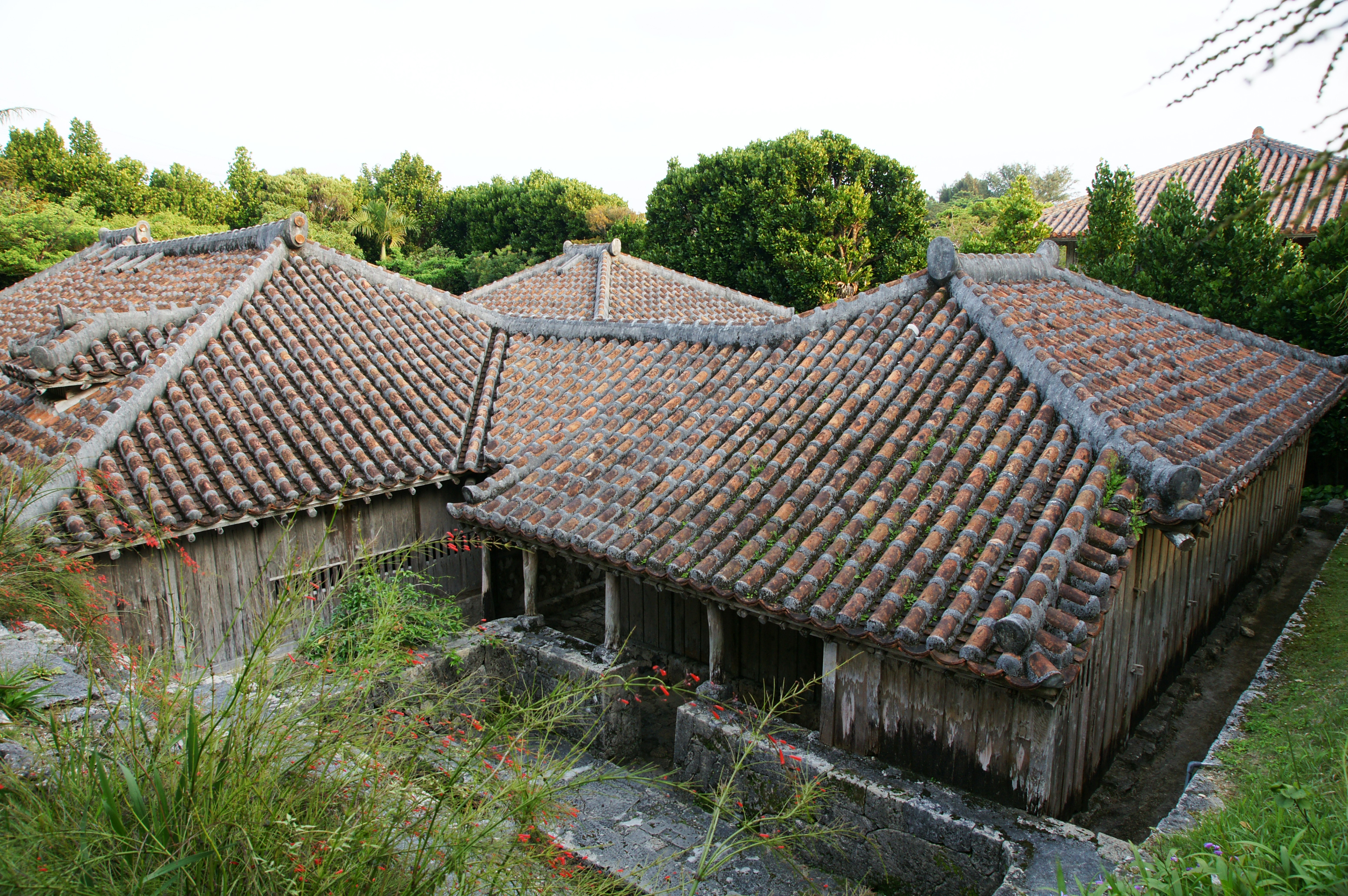
Nakamura house

== Attractions ==
=== Natural ===
- Cape Manzamo
- Cape Hedo
- Sefa-utaki
- Okinawa Senseki Quasi-National Park
- Gyokusendo Cave
- Moon Beach is a natural beach shaped like a crescent moon with tropical trees

=== Other ===
- Okinawa Churaumi Aquarium
- Mid-Sea Road
- Kokusaidori main street of Naha
- The American Village in Chatan, Okinawa.
- Okinawa World
- Junglia Okinawa

== Culture ==
=== Festivals ===
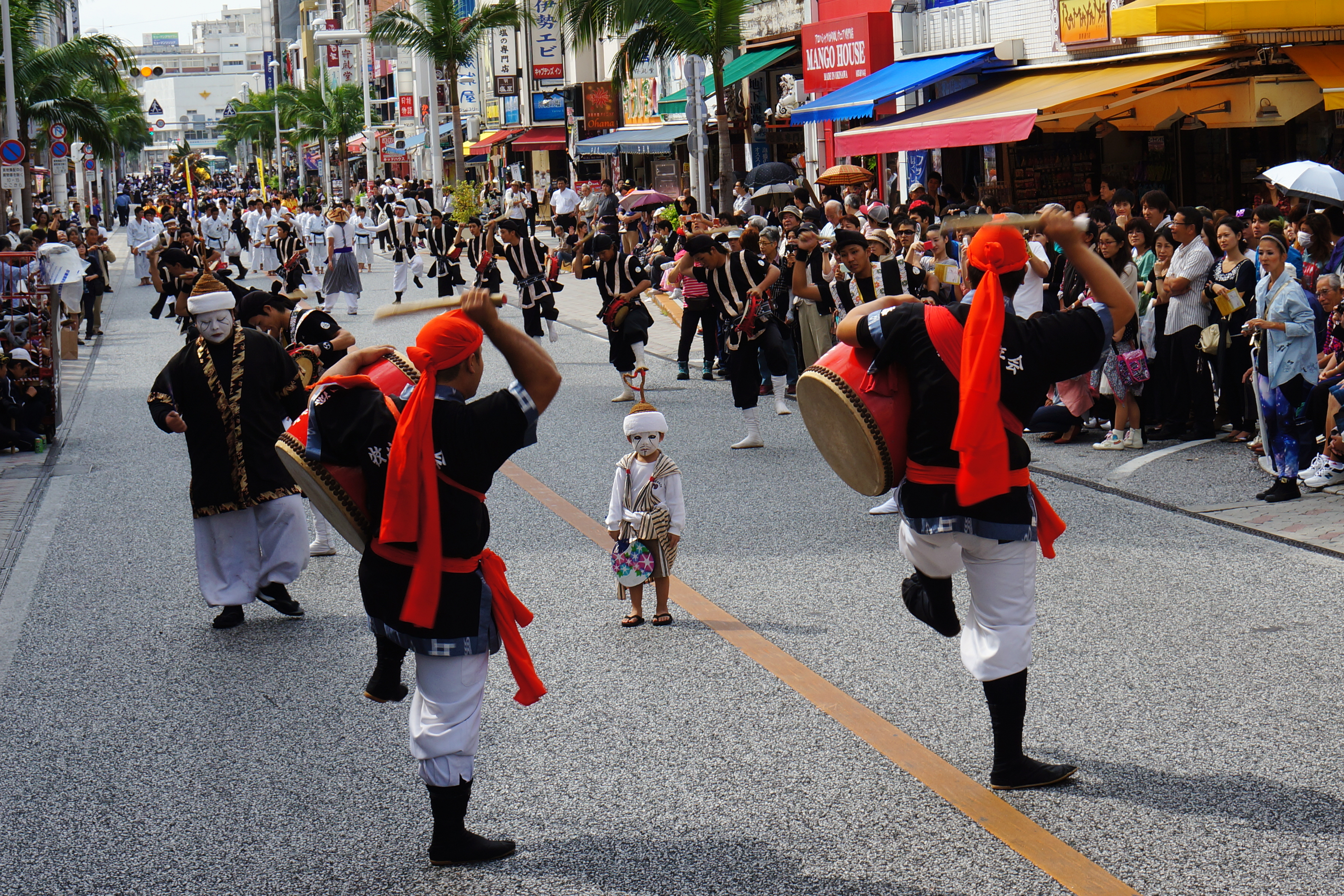
Shuri Castle Festival in Naha

There are multiple festivals on Okinawa throughout the year.

- Shurijo Castle Park New Year's Celebration – January
- Cherry Blossom Festival – January, February
- Naha Hari Festival – May
- Orion Beerfest – September
- Eisa Dancers Parade – October
- Shuri Castle Festival – October
- Naha Great Tug-of-War Festival – October
- The Ryukyu Dynasty Festival Shuri – November

=== Sports ===
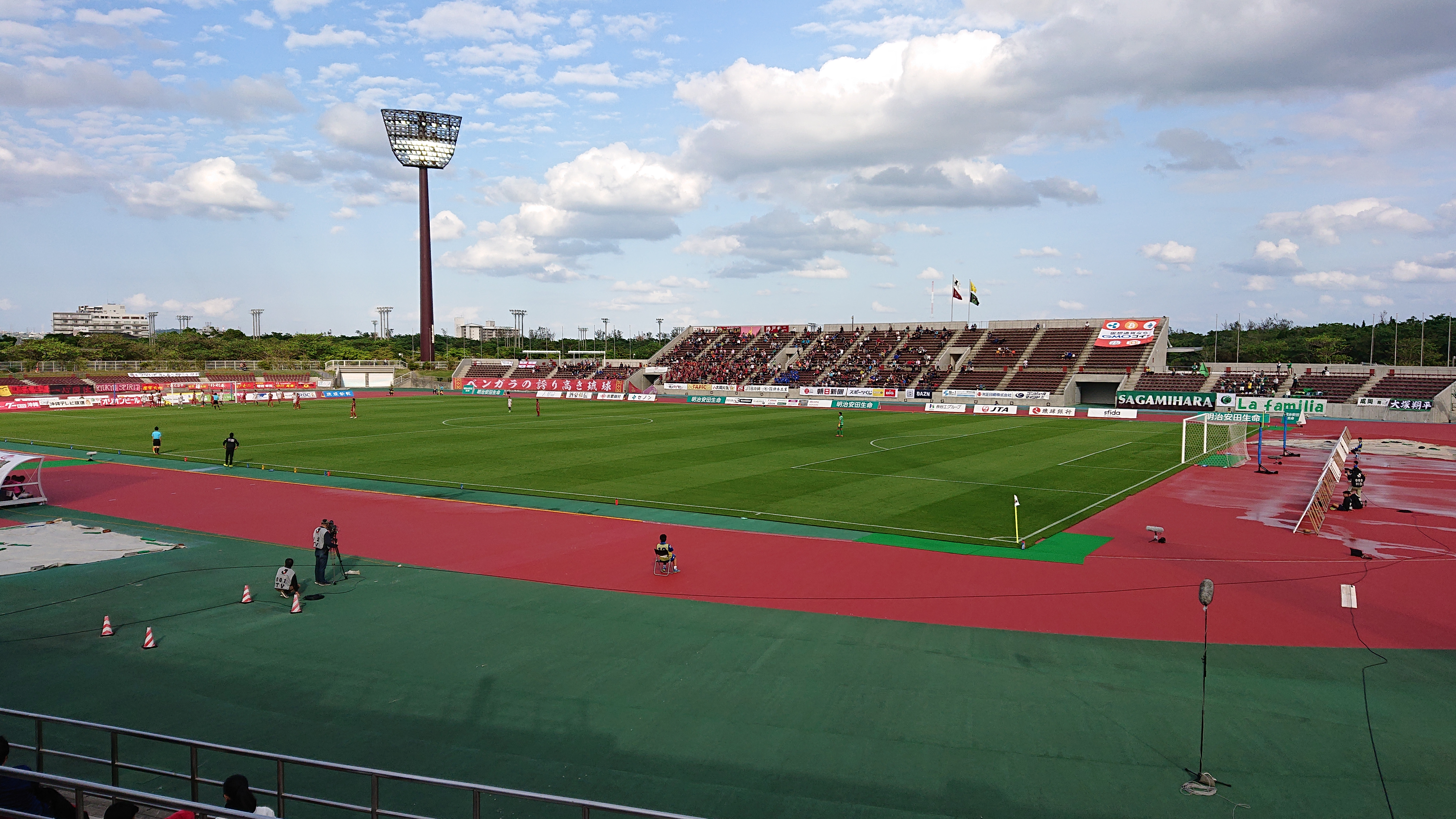
Tapic Kenso Hiyagon Stadium in Okinawa

- FC Ryukyu, association football team, plays in J2 League.
- Ryukyu Golden Kings, basketball team, plays in B.League.

== Transportation ==
=== Airport ===
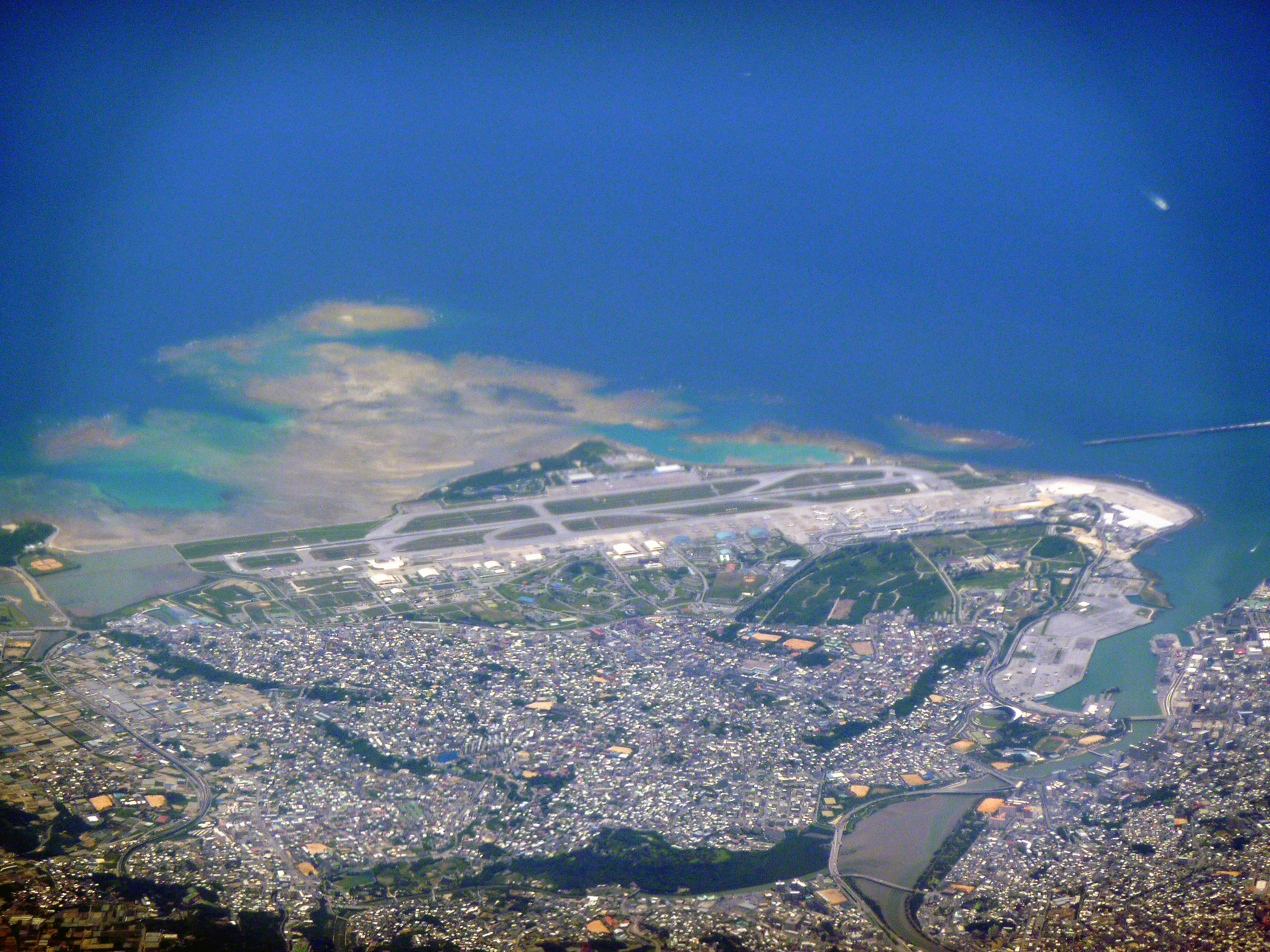
Naha Airport (2010)

Naha Airport is the main transportation hub for the Ryukyu Islands and has an increasingly large role in regional logistics. All Nippon Airways opened a cargo hub at the airport in 2009, providing overnight freight service between Japan and other Asian countries.

=== Monorail ===
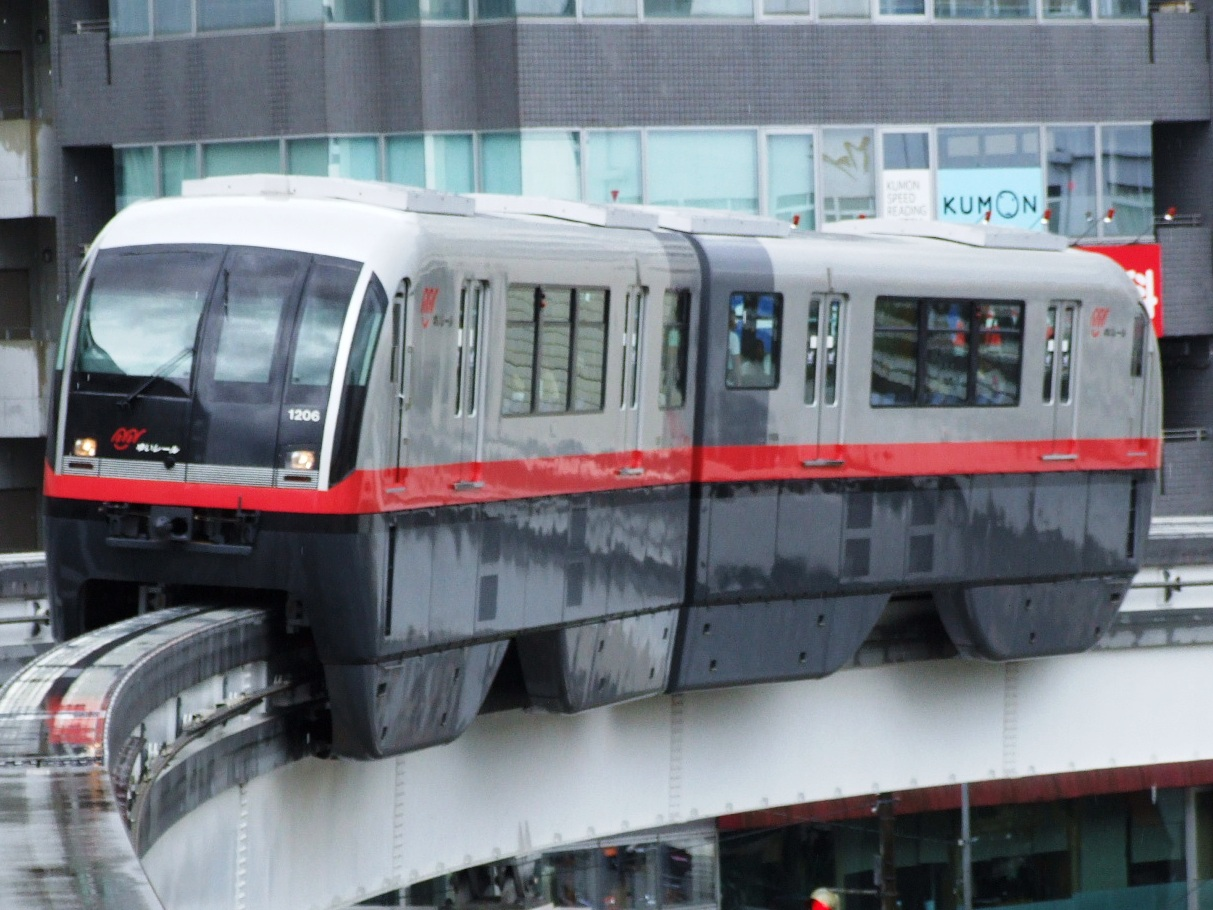
Okinawa Urban Monorail

The Okinawa Urban Monorail (Yui Rail) runs from Naha Airport to Japan's south-easternmost monorail station, Akamine Station, before heading to its final destination of Tedako-Uranishi Station (Urasoe) and back.

=== Buses ===
There are multiple bus companies, such as Toyo Bus, Ryukyu Bus Kotsu, Naha Bus, and Okinawa Bus.

=== Roads ===
The Okinawa Expressway is a toll road that runs from Naha to Nago, and has a speed limit of 80 km/h (50 mph), the highest on the island.

=== Ferries ===
There are many ferries to many of the nearby islands, such as Ie Shima. Tomarin Port in Naha, has ferries to nearby islands such as Aguni, Tokashiki and Zamami.

== Regions and cities ==
=== Northern Okinawa ===
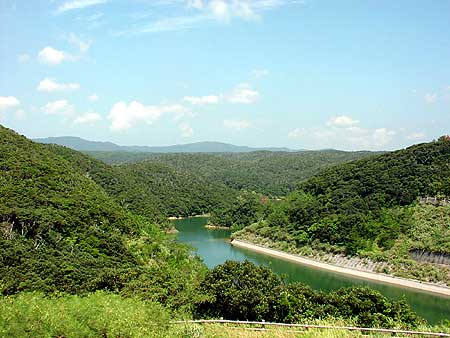
Yanbaru forest and Mount Yonaha

With Kunigami district, it has an area of 764 square kilometers (295 sq mi) and a population of about 120,000. There is much nature with subtropical rainforest.

- Kunigami District
  - Ginoza
  - Higashi
  - Kinmu
  - Kunigami
  - Motobu
  - Nakijin
  - Ōgimi
  - Onna
- Nago

=== Central Okinawa ===
With Nakagami district, it has an area of 280 square kilometers (110 sq mi) and a population of about 590,000. Most U.S. military facilities are located here. Urasoe has strong connections with the southern municipalities, including the Southern Wide Area Municipal Area Administrative Association, Nishihara town, Nakagusuku village, and Kitanakagusuku Village. These belong to the Southern Wide Area Administrative Association.

- Ginowan
- Nakagami district
  - Yomitan
  - Kadena
  - Chatan
  - Kitanakagusuku
  - Nakagusuku
  - Nishihara
- Okinawa City
- Urasoe
- Uruma

=== Southern Okinawa ===
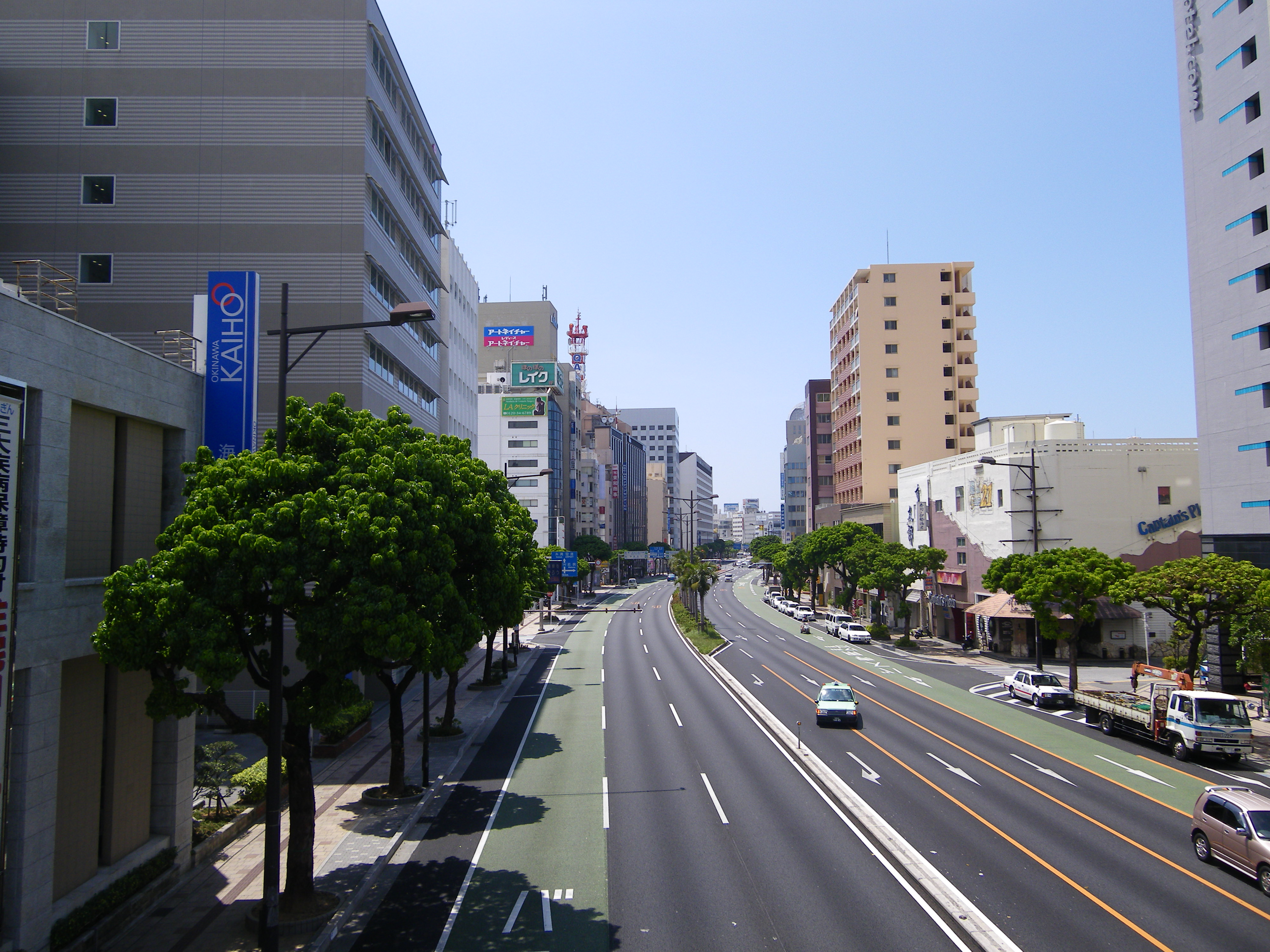
Matsuyama intersection in Naha

With Shimajiri district, it has an area of 198 square kilometers (76 sq mi) and a population of about 540,000. The capital is Naha.

- Itoman
- Naha
- Nanjo
- Shimajiri district
  - Haebaru
  - Yaese
  - Yonabaru
- Tomigusuku

== Photo gallery ==
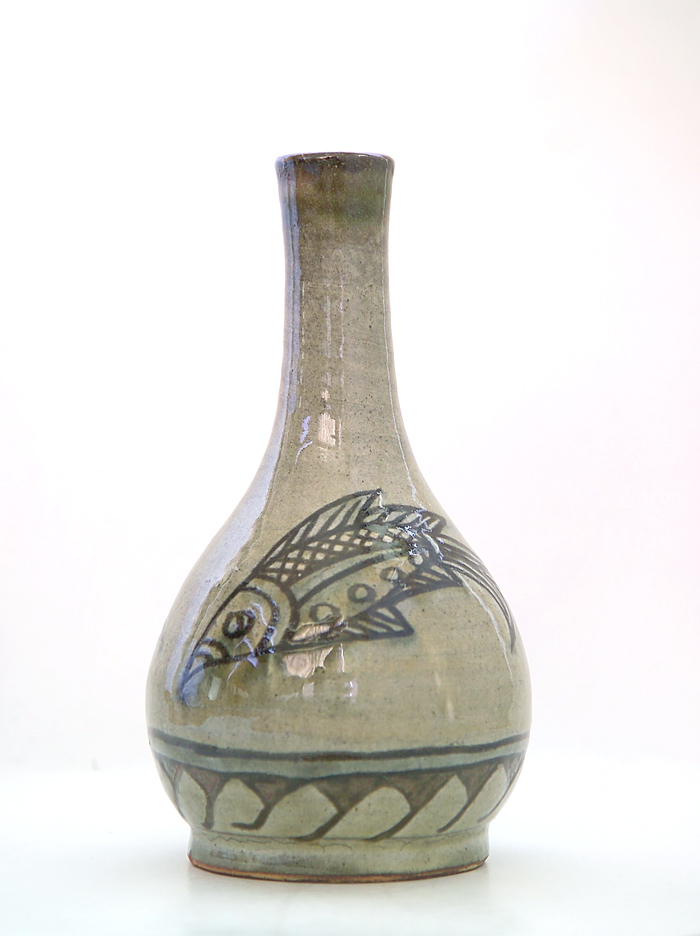
Okinawa Island is the home of Tsuboya-yaki, pottery in the Ryūkyūan tradition

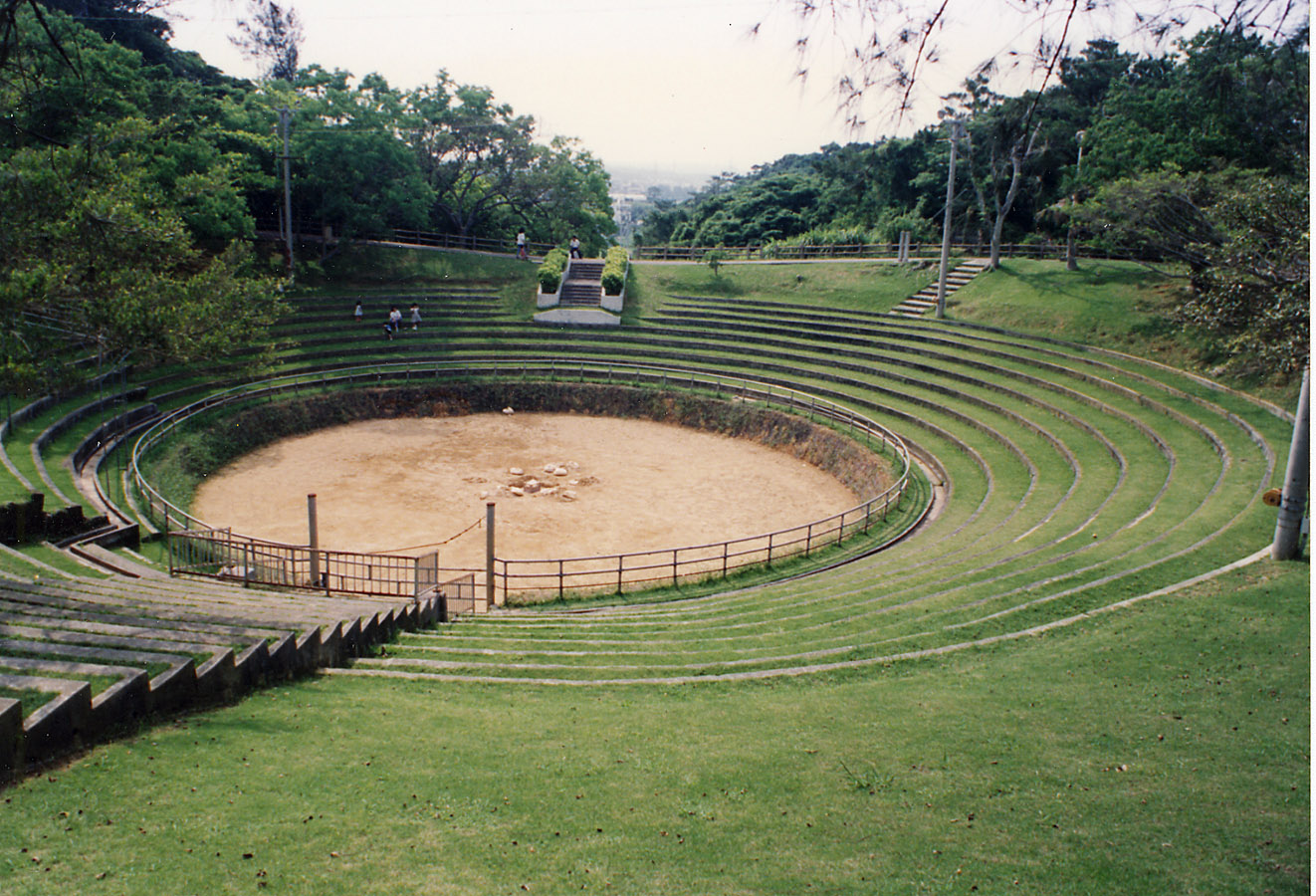
Bullfighting (Tōgyū) arena. Okinawa is the home of a form of bullfighting sometimes compared to sumo

== See also ==
- Geography of Japan
- History of the Ryukyu Islands
  - Ryukyu Kingdom – Island kingdom in East Asia (1429–1879)
    - List of monarchs of Ryukyu Islands
    - Shō Dynasties family tree – Monarchs of Okinawa Island (1372–1879)
- Japanese archipelago – Archipelago off the coast of Northeast Asia
- Names of Okinawa – Etymology of Okinawa and Ryukyu
- Okinawan martial arts
