= Uniforms of the Imperial Japanese Army =

Uniforms worn by personnel of the Imperial Japanese Army

Imperial Japanese Army uniforms tended to reflect the uniforms of those countries who were the principal advisors to the Imperial Japanese Army at the time.

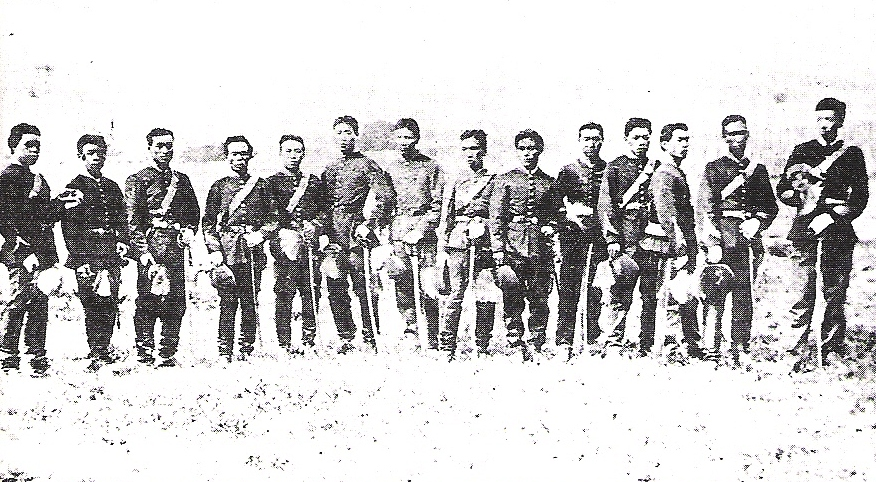
Various military uniforms from 1875.

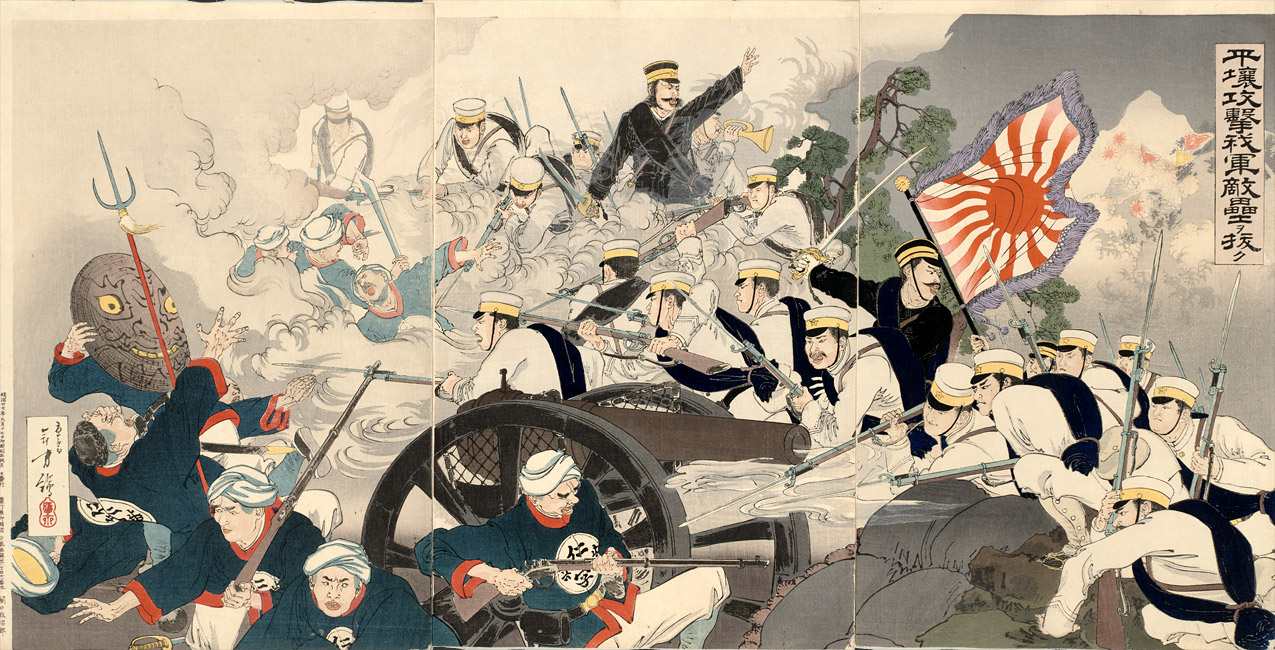
Soldiers and officers from the 1890s. The Rising Sun flag on the right is the military flag (regimental flag) of an Imperial Japanese Army infantry regiment. Officers wear military uniforms (equivalent to winter uniforms), while enlisted men wear summer uniforms.

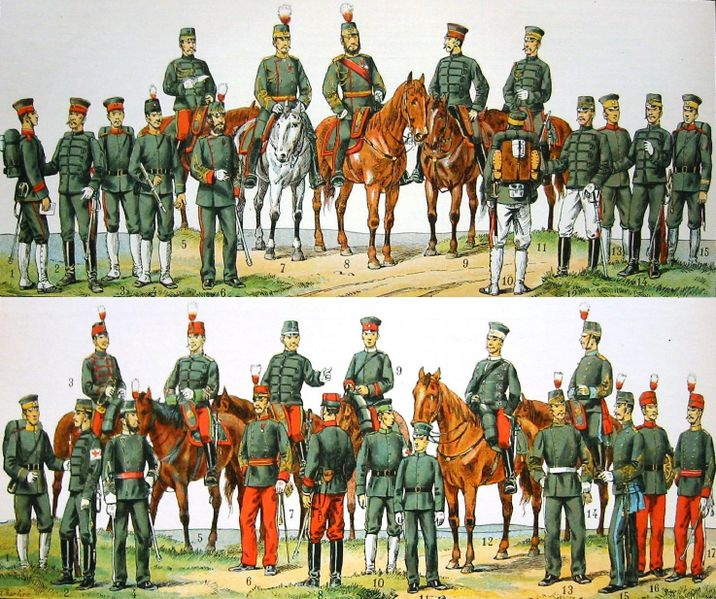
Various military uniforms worn by officers and soldiers around 1900

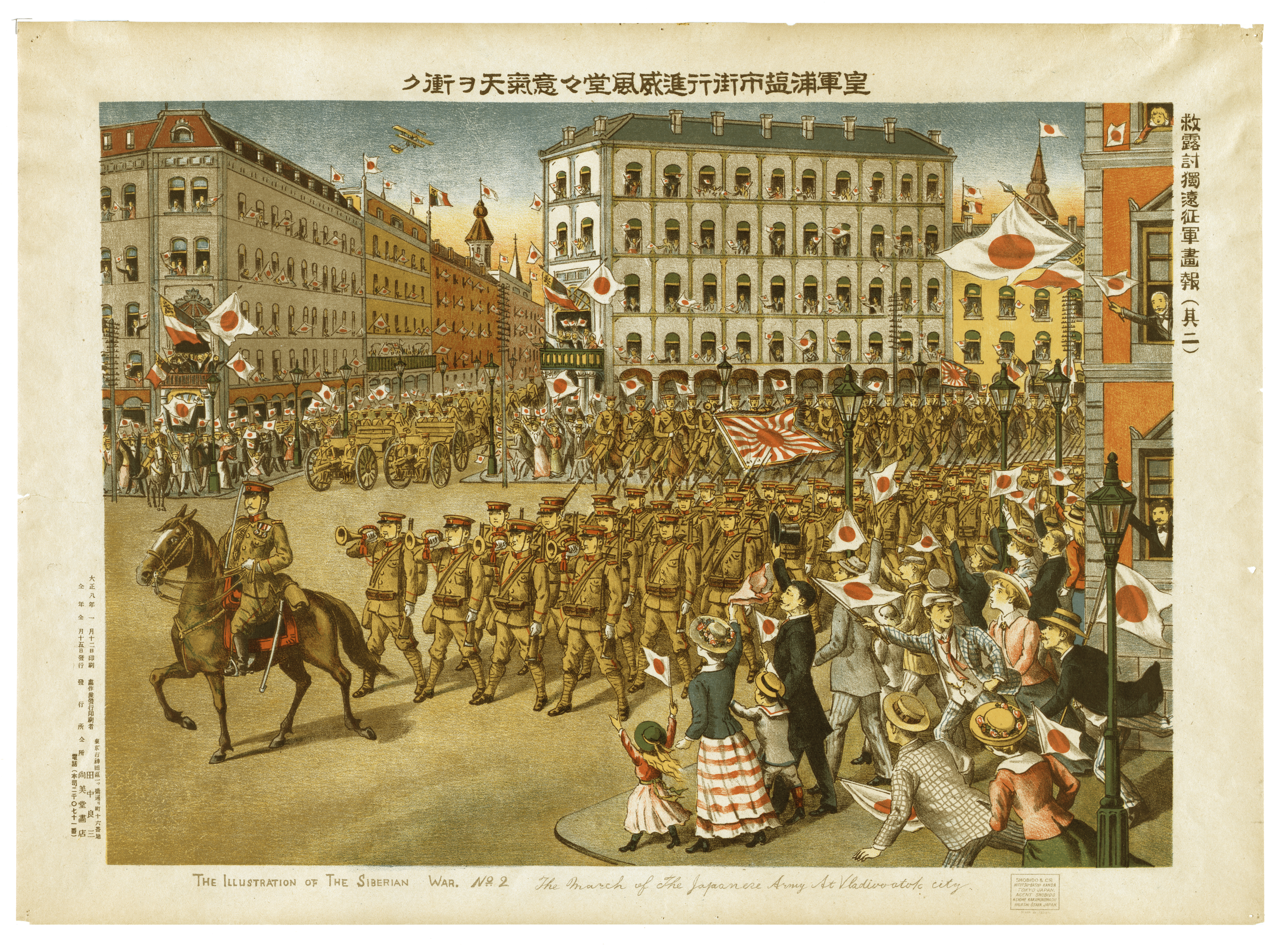
Military officers and soldiers from the 1910s to the early 1920s.

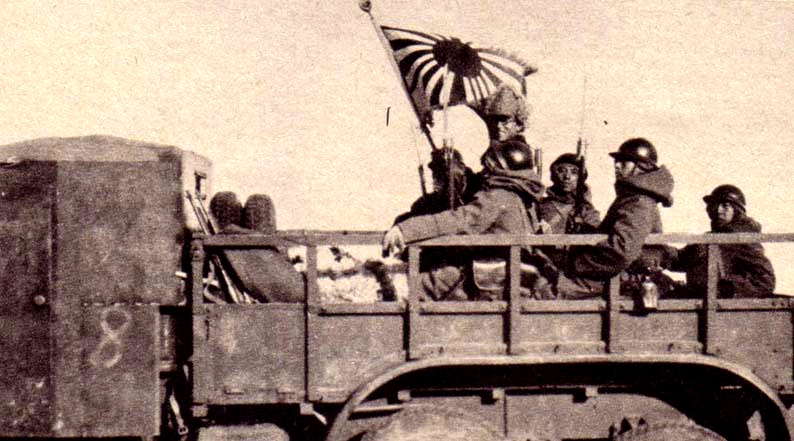
Military officers and soldiers in the early 1930s.

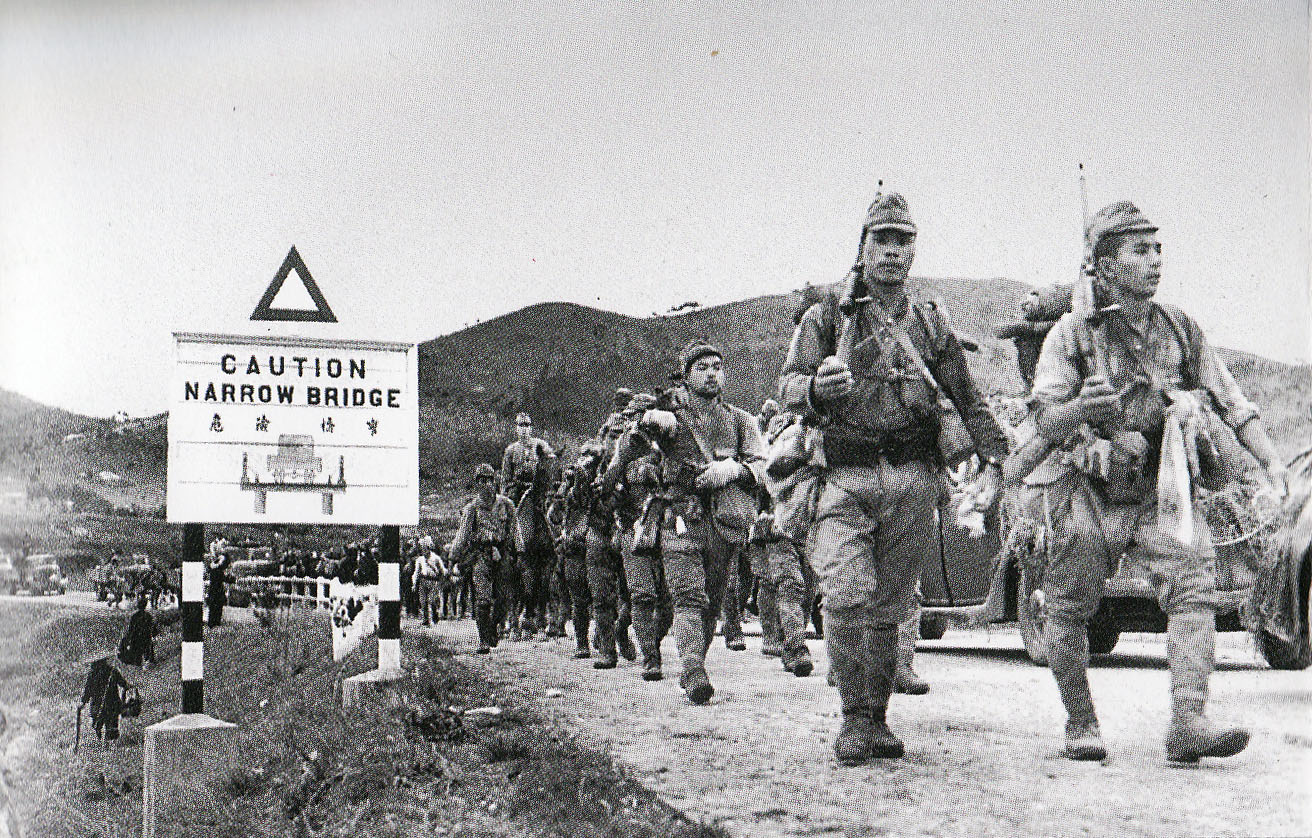
Enlisted personnel in the early 1940s.

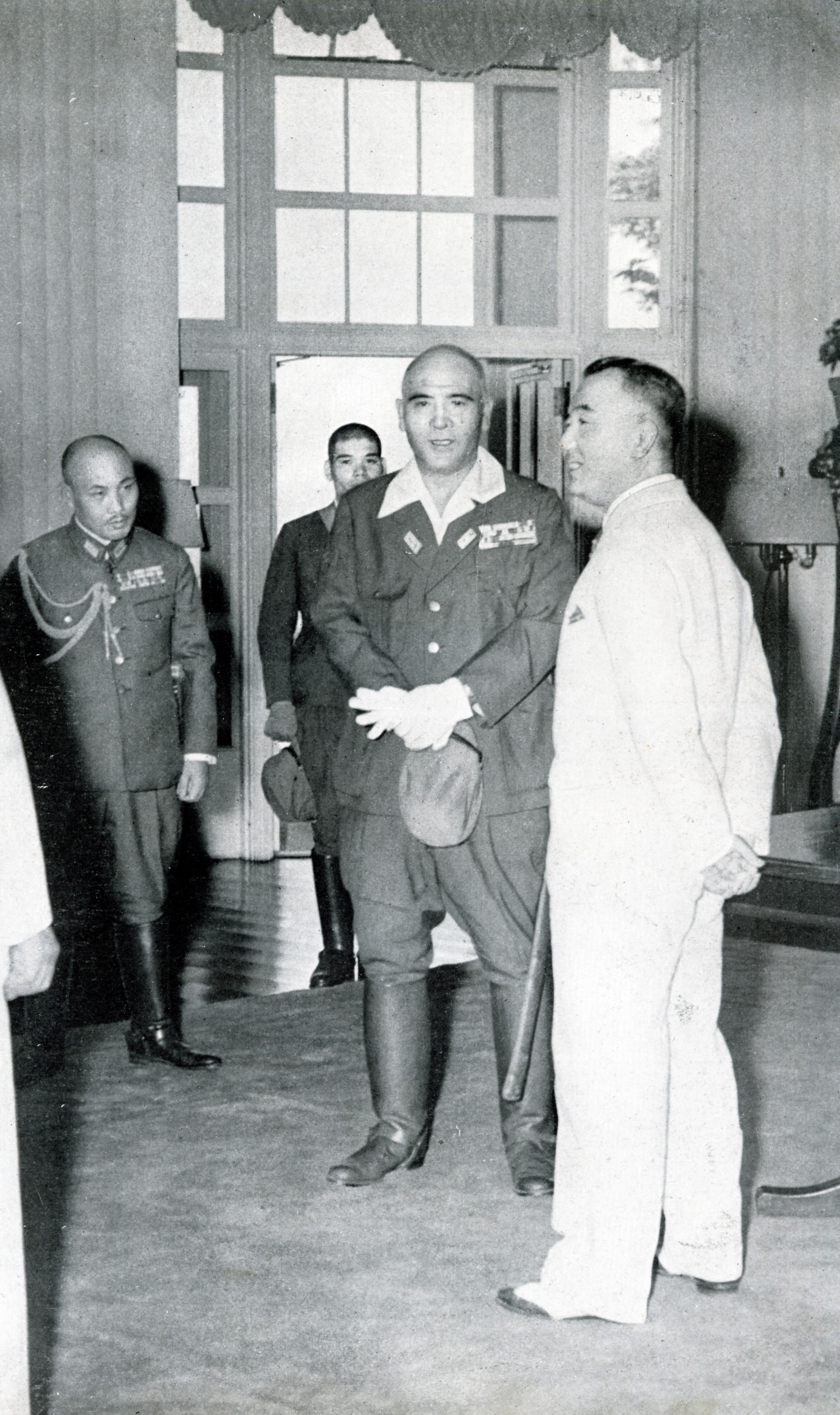
Masaharu Homma in the early 1940s.

== Early uniforms ==
=== 1871 version ===
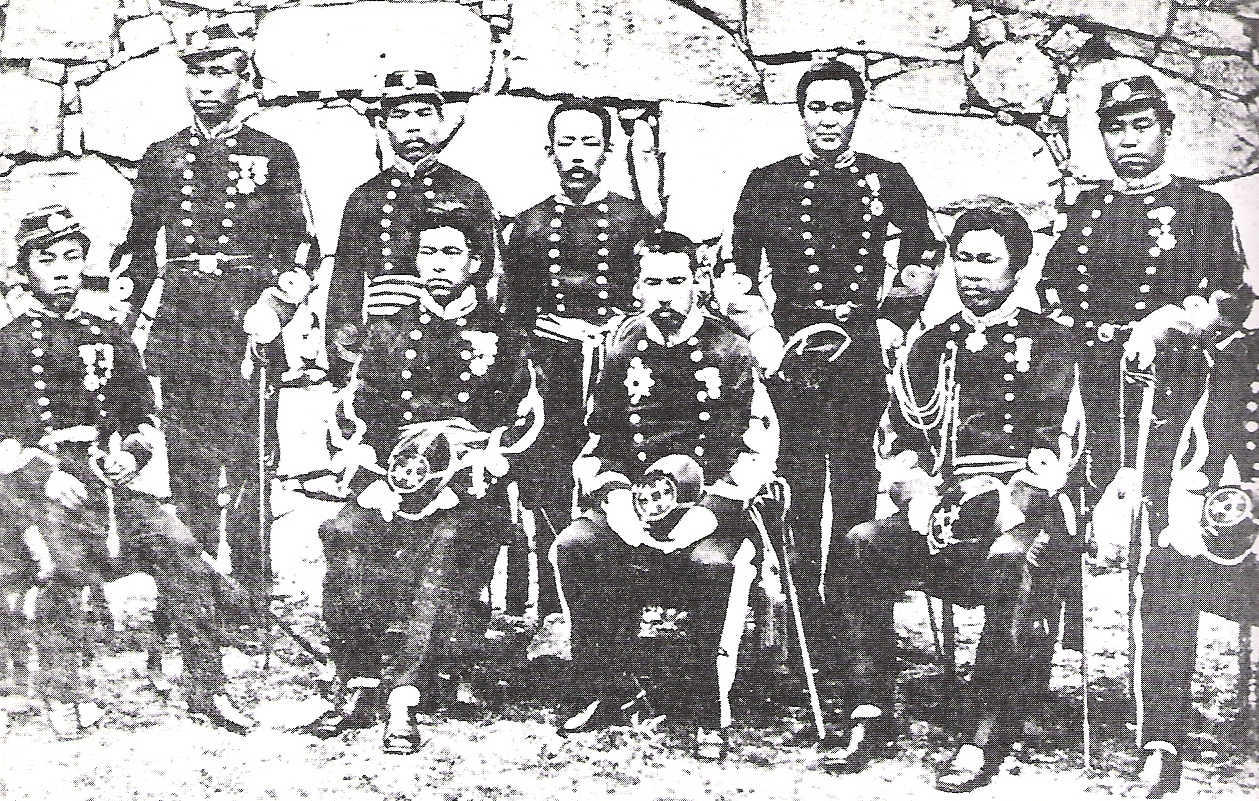
File:IJA Soldiers in Kumamoto circa 1877.

The first type of uniform was inspired by the French style, the soldiers wore a blue uniform, blue pants, with yellow details, and a blue kepi with an imperial symbol and a star on top. The officers wore a more refined version, with gold details on the sleeves, pants and collars. The kepi had more than one star to indicate their position. Other extra options were also a bicorne hat and ribbed tunic.

=== Meiji 19 1886 version ===
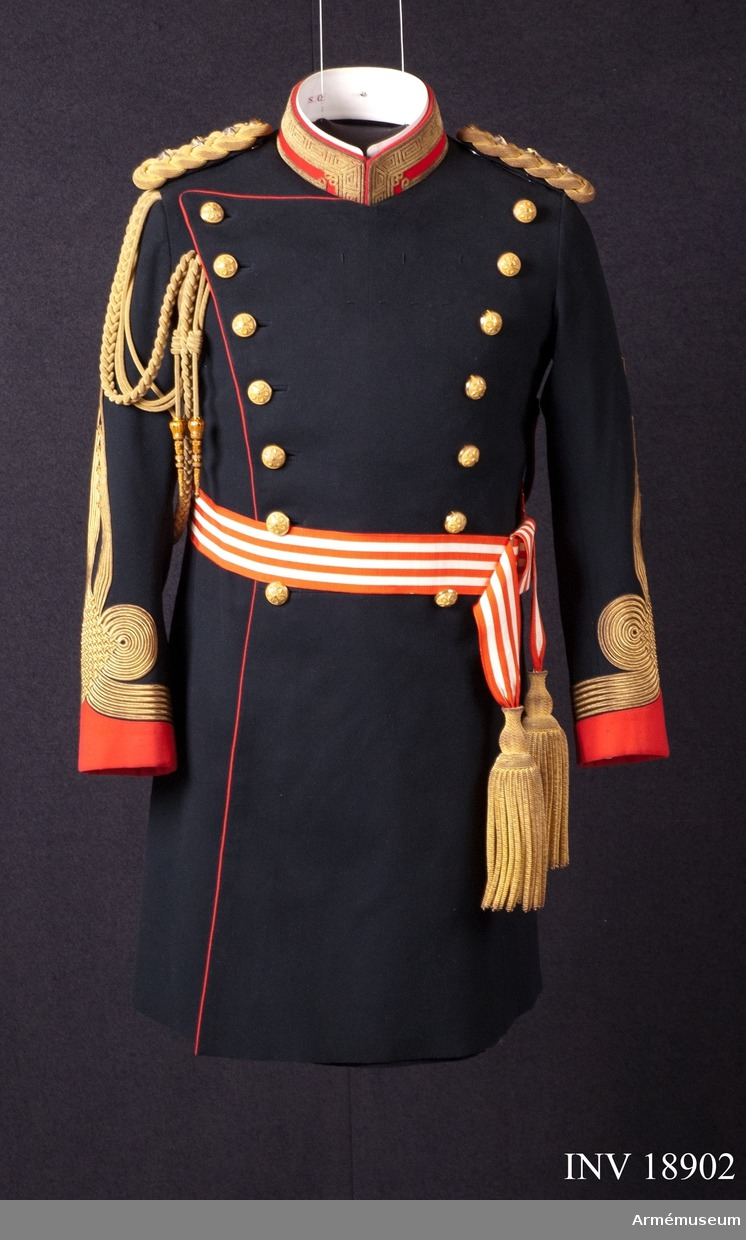
Parade uniform of Japanese military attaché, Major General Onodera Makoto, 1930s

Resembling the Imperial German Army M1842/M1856 dunkelblau uniform, the Meiji 19 1886 version tunic was the dark blue, single-breasted, had a low standing collar and no pockets. It was worn with matching straight trousers and a kepi (red for Imperial Guard) on which was worn a brass five point star. After the Franco-Prussian War the kepi was replaced with a flat topped peaked cap and the tunic collar became higher. Pockets were added to officers' tunics late in its issue.

Infantry uniforms had red facings on tunic collars, shoulder straps and trouser stripes. Line infantry had yellow bands and piping on their caps while the infantry of the Imperial Guard were distinguished by red. Trouser seams for both branches of the infantry had wide red stripes. Artillery had yellow facings on their dark blue uniforms. The branch colour for engineers was dark brown, green for medical and light blue for transport units. Finance, administration and other support services had white facings.

A dark blue shako (red for Imperial Guard units) with a short white plume was worn for full dress. The ordinary duty and active service headdress was however a form of peaked cap with a narrow crown, somewhat resembling the French kepi of the period.

A lightweight white cotton uniform was used for fatigue duties and tropical wear. In hot weather white trousers and cap covers were worn with the dark blue tunics. White canvas leggings were worn by non-mounted personnel with both white and blue uniforms until 1906.

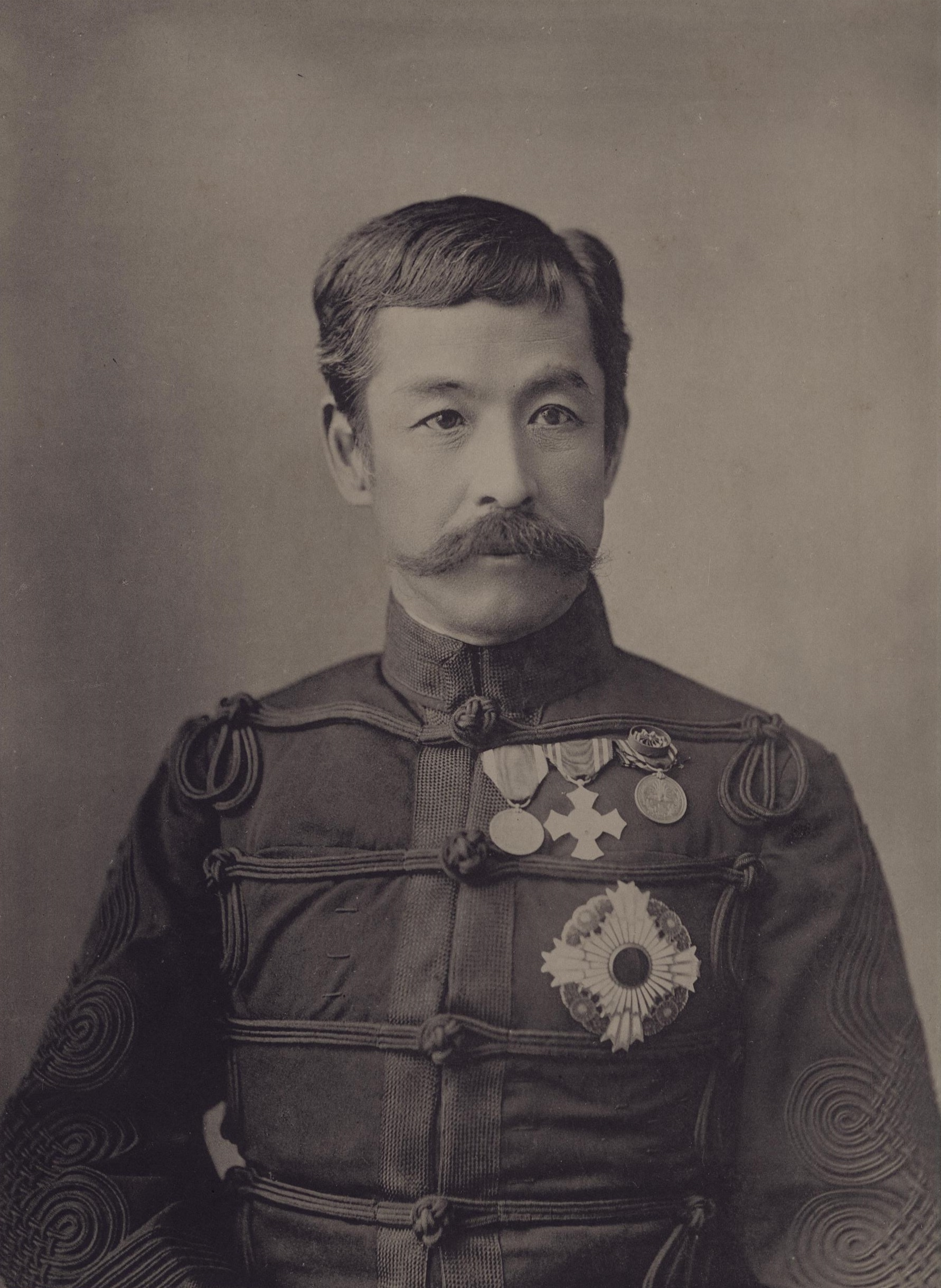
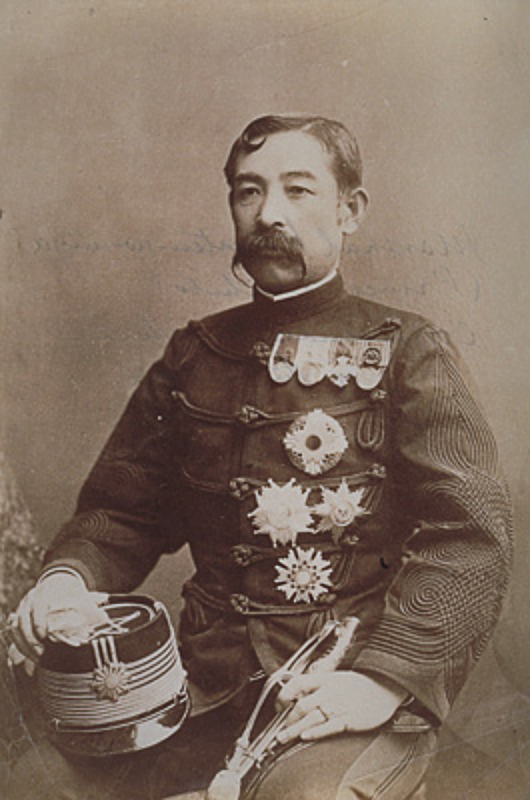
Prince Kitashirakawa Yoshihisa and Prince Komatsu Akihito in 1886 version senior officers' uniform

Senior officers could wear a longer, double-breasted version of the tunic in full dress. Other features included elaborate Austrian knots (gold braiding on the cuffs according to rank), waist sashes, gold shoulder cords and plumes on the dress kepi. For ordinary duties and active service officers of all ranks wore dark blue dolmans braided in black. In 1904 this was replaced by a dark blue tunic of simpler pattern.

Cavalry regiments wore a short attila jacket with transverse hussar-style braiding in yellow (red for the cavalry of the Imperial Guard). Breeches were red. The cavalry branch colour was green and in 1905 this colour appeared on both collars and breeches stripes. As with the other branches of the Imperial Guard, the cavalry were distinguished by red bands and piping on their service caps. Red trousers were also worn by army bands and by the Military Police (Kenpeitai).

The dark blue uniform adopted under the 1886 Regulations was retained with only minor modifications until 1905. As such it was worn during the early months of the Russo-Japanese War. A khaki summer uniform had been introduced shortly before the outbreak of war and this became general issue for front line infantry during June–August 1904. Cavalry and artillery were subsequently issued with the new khaki uniform but some second line units continued to wear dark blue until the end of the War in September 1905. During the winter of 1904-05 the heavier blue uniforms were again worn but often under the loose fitting summer khaki drill for camouflage. The white canvas leggings continued to be worn without darkening, until after the war.

Following the Russo-Japanese War the Japanese Army adopted khaki for all occasions – the first major army to discard colourful parade dress. Only the cavalry squadrons of the Imperial Guard and officers of all branches were authorized to retain their coloured uniforms for certain ceremonial and social occasions, until 1939.

== Khaki uniforms ==
Different types of Khaki uniforms during World War II (American poster)

=== 1904 enlisted khaki uniform ===
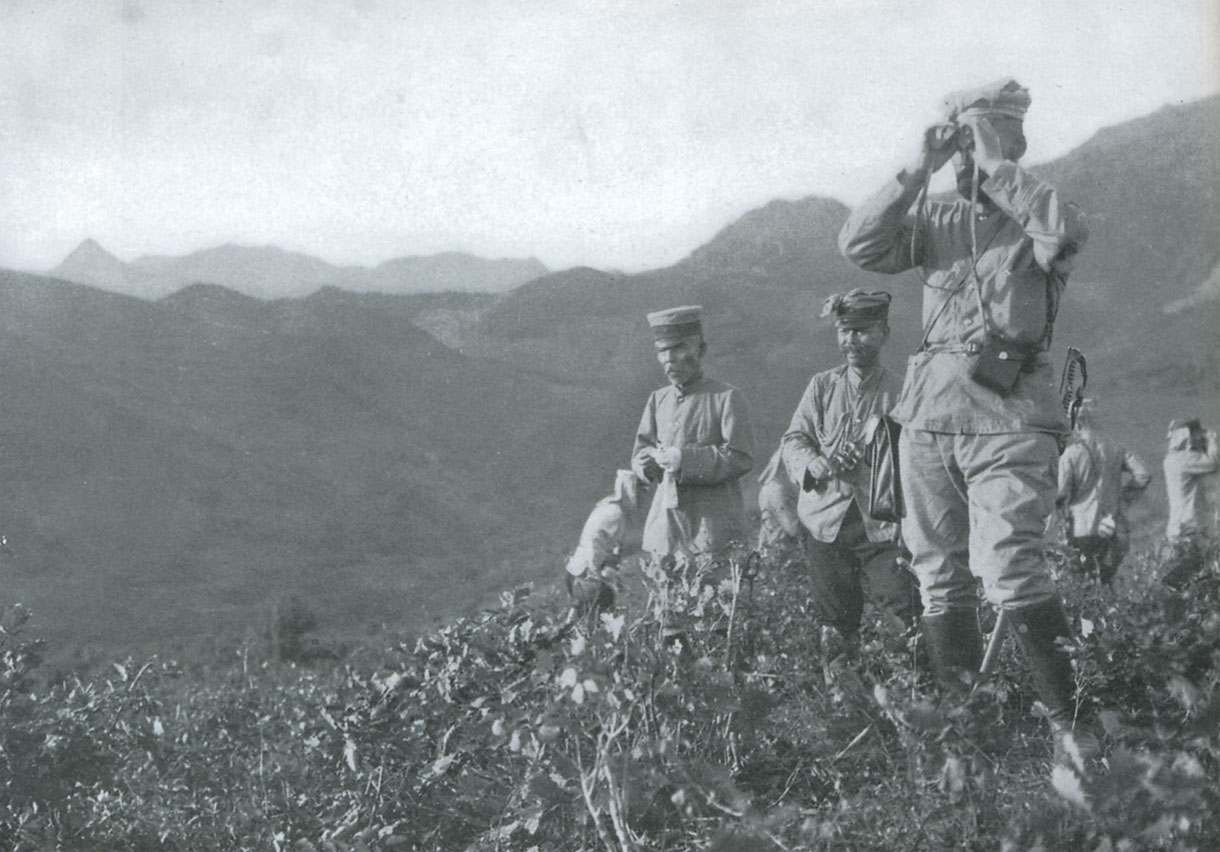
IJA General Kuroki and his Chief of Staff wearing the 1904 uniform during the Battle of Liaoyang.

This was basically a khaki cotton version of the 1886 uniform with a shorter jacket. First appearing as a fatigue dress in 1900, it was being issued as a hot-weather uniform in 1904 as there was an order to dye their white uniforms khaki. The practical advantages of khaki drill over dark blue became obvious in the opening stages of the Russo-Japanese War and it became general issue for troops on active service as stocks became available. In 1906 a khaki serge cold-weather uniform and greatcoat had also been adopted.

=== Meiji 38 (1906) ===
The Meiji 38 was introduced in 1906 as the first fully Khaki uniform for the army. This uniform looks very similar to the future Type 45 uniform however, the Meiji 38’s sleeve was cut with a true cuff while the 45 had a false cuff. In addition, the Meiji 38 was produced with Meiji 19 style buttons while the Type 45 would be produced with a newer type of brass button. The home service uniform was still produced in a blue color.

=== 1911 (45 Shiki-Gun-i) ===
The 1911 or Type 45 uniform replaced the Meiji 38 uniform as a more refined version of the uniform. The T45 khaki colored version (called khaki in the west the colour was actually a yellowish-brown called Ochre) of the blue uniform. The new flat topped peaked cap had a red band, the tunic collar had red swallow tailed gorget patches and the shoulders had red shoulder bars (see photograph opposite) to indicate rank. The uniform was produced in wool for winter and cotton for summer wear.

==== Type Kai 45 ====
The Type 45 was further updated in 1918 as the Type Kai 45. The term “Kai” was to denote that it was a modification of the original Type 45 uniform. It was a change in sizing measurements. It was later modified with a change in material and discarding of the red piping on the uniforms. In addition, inserts were added for shoulder ranks so soldiers didn’t have to sew ranks on and just switch out ranks for replacements or promotions. They were still being issued into the 1930s alongside the newer Type 5 uniforms.

=== Type 5 ===
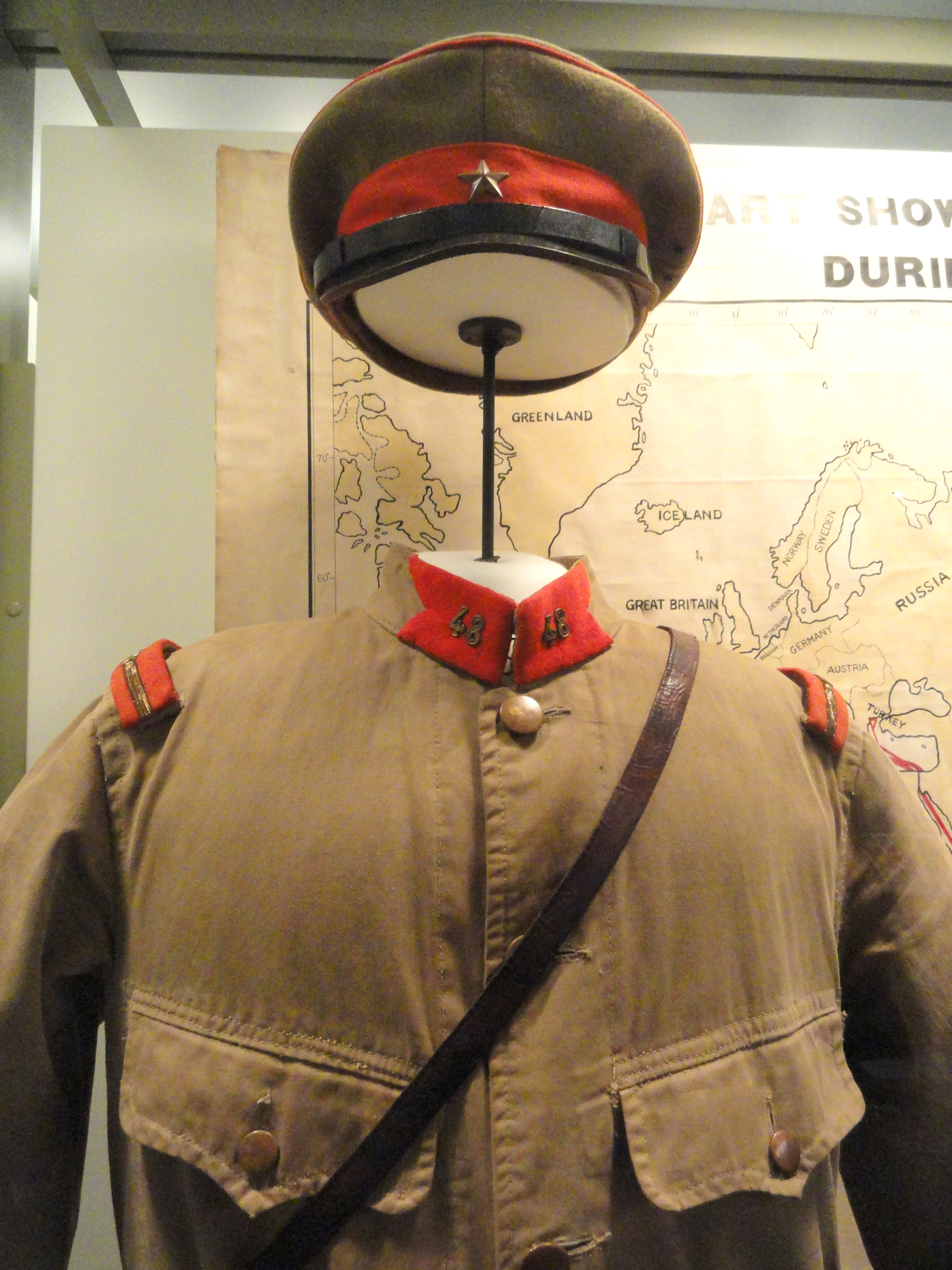
5 Shiki-Gun-i

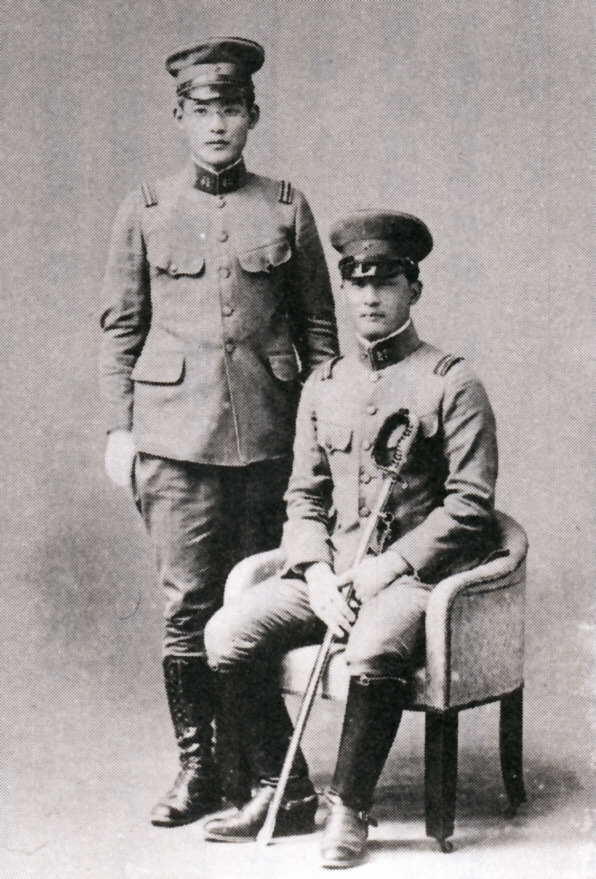
1st Lieut. Saburō Suganami and Col. Chōsei Oyadomari in 5 Shiki-Gun-i.

The Showa Type 5, also called the M90 or 2590 or 1930 uniform, was basically the Type 45 uniform but introduced internal breast pockets with scalloped pocket flaps on the tunic for all ranks. It also featured a seam on the back not present in the Type 45 uniform in order to save on material as well as being made to the newly adopted metric measurements rather than in the old system of measurement. Also the straight trousers were later replaced with pantaloons which were worn with woolen spiral wound puttees and tapes.

=== M98 (98 Shiki-Gun-i) ===
"Jap Army Uniforms" (American poster 1944)

The M98 (1938) was a further modification of the M90 uniform. The single breasted tunic (98 Shiki-Gun-i) had a stand and fall collar, five buttons which ran down the front and two, or more usually, four internal pockets with scalloped flaps (depending on the manufacturer). Long trousers or pantaloons (Bousyo-ko) were worn as standard along with the puttees (Kya-han) and tapes. All except mounted troops (who wore breeches and high leather boots) wore this uniform with horsehide, pigskin or leather ankle-boots. The boots (amiage-gutu) had either a hobnailed hard leather sole with metal heel J-cleat or a rubber sole with rubber cleats. When off duty, soldiers could wear tabis. A collarless wool or cotton white, grey or light green under shirt (Bousho Jyu-han) was worn under the tunic. This had one or two patch breast pockets with buttoned flaps, most had only a single pocket on the left breast. A khaki cotton shirt with stand and fall collar and two breast pockets could be worn in warm climates, with or without the tunic. The flat-topped peaked cap was replaced by a cloth field cap (Ryaku-bou). Originally produced in khaki it was later produced in various shades of green ranging from grey-green to a dark green. The cap was more of a peaked sidecap and could be worn with a neck flap (Bou-tare), hooked to the bottom for sun protection, made from four cloth rectangles.

=== Type 3 (3 Shiki-Gun-i) ===
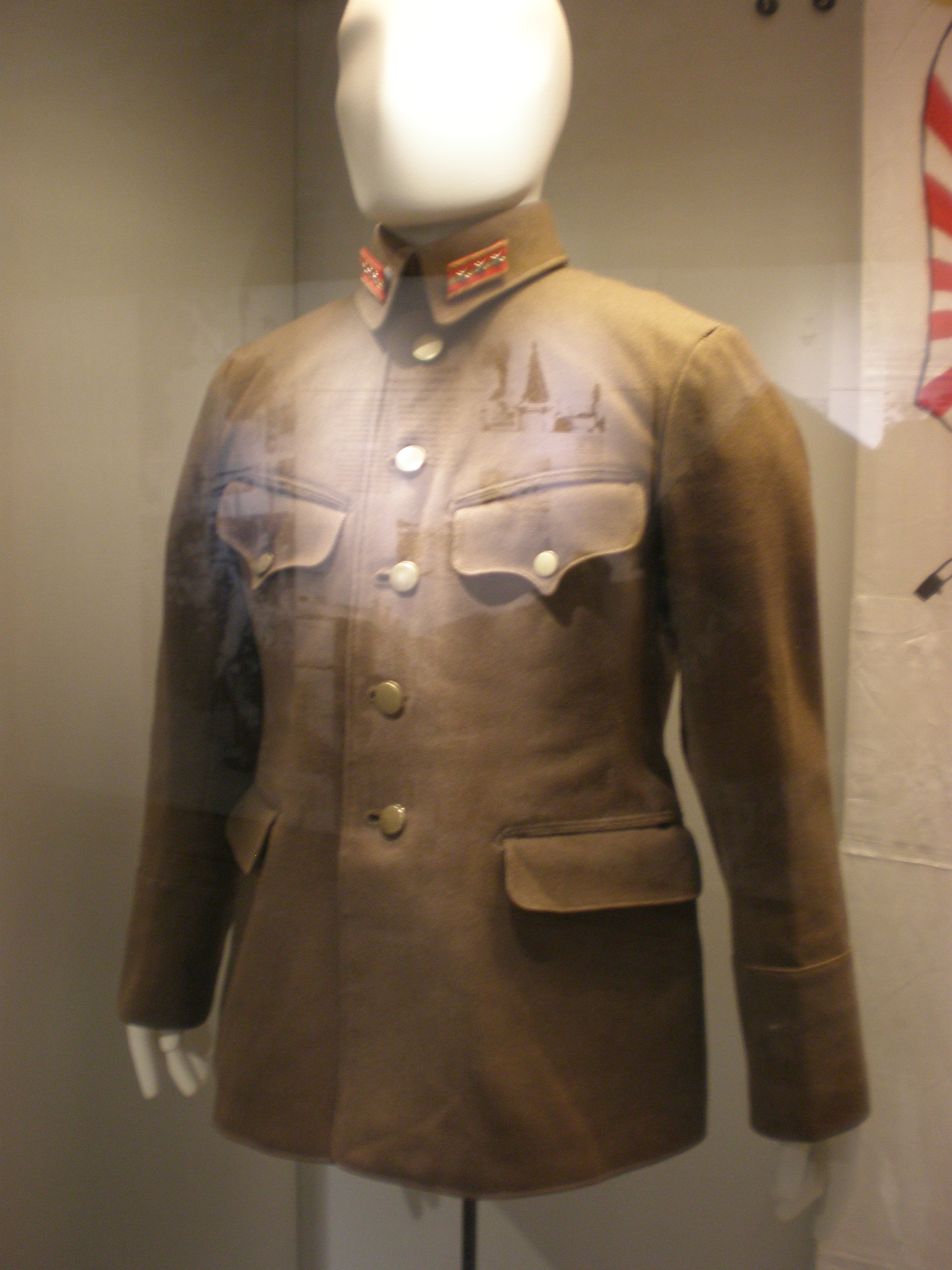
3 Shiki-Gun-i

The Type 3 was introduced in 1943 and was similar to the Type 98 but was made of cheaper materials. Type 3 uniforms for enlisted men also consisted of only 3 size options compared to the 6 size options for the Type 98. Type 3 trousers were also cut lower down the waist and the fastening hook was replaced with a button top instead. It also reintroduced cuff insignias for officers consisting of 1, 2, or 3 stripes of dark-brown braid on or above the cuff to indicate company, field, or general officers' grades respectively. It was produced in various shades of green. Officers could wear the uniform tunic open over a white or light green shirt with or without a black or green tie.

=== Officers' uniforms ===
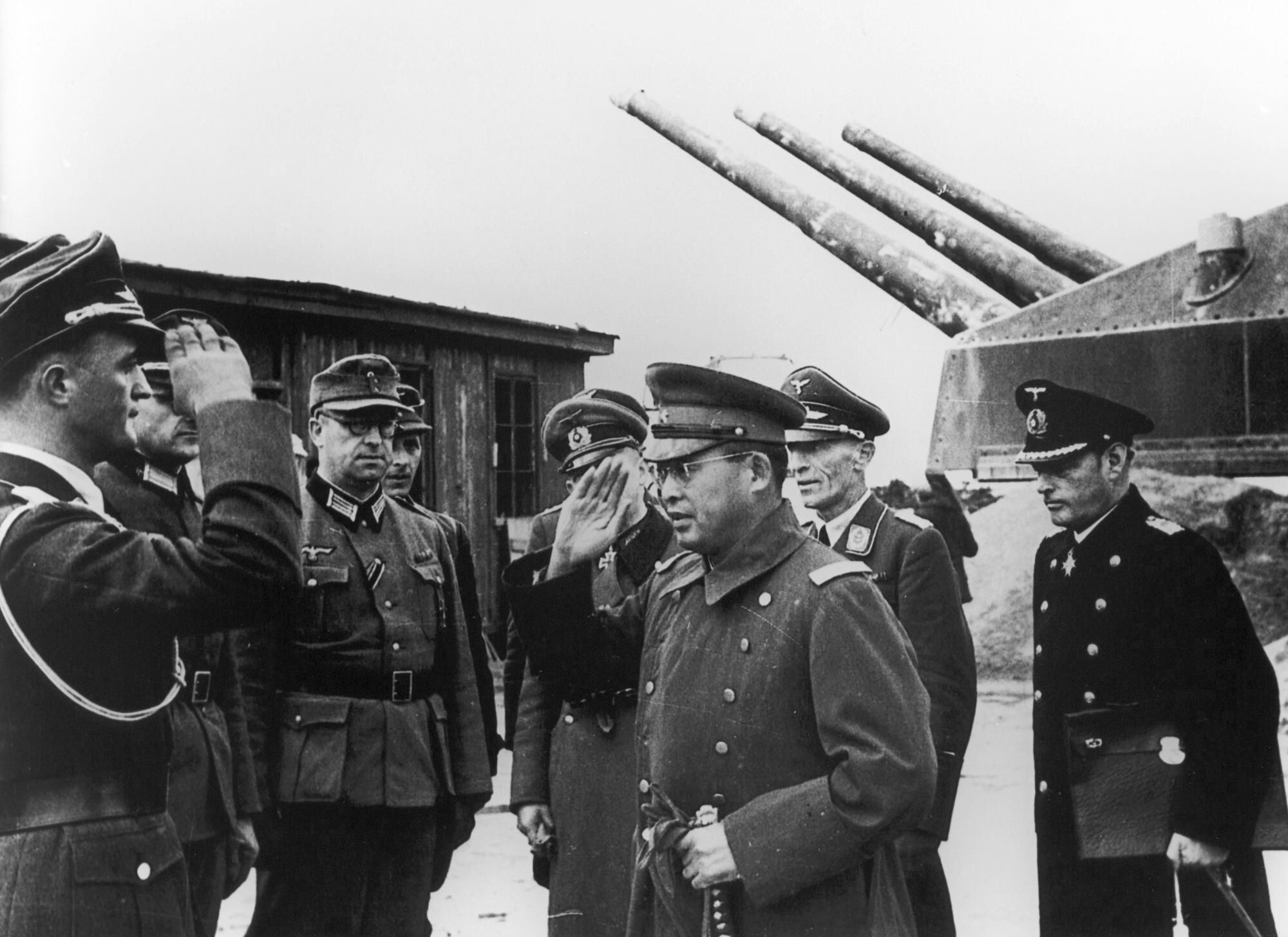
General Makoto Onodera in officers' uniform.

Officers were not usually issued uniforms so they had to procure their own, thus there was a wide variety in the details, colour and texture of their uniforms, with uniform colours ranging from tan (this case is modified Older Uniform. its started after Showa 13 rules(昭和13年制式) era) to dark green. Collars were taller and stiffer and materials were of a higher quality. Senior officers could procure and wear a double-breasted version of the blue and M90 uniforms. All ranks wore a single breasted version of the M98. Officers could wear straight trousers with their M98 uniforms as a walking out uniform and later they could also wear the tunic with the collar open over a white or grey green shirt.

== Headgear ==
=== Service hat ===
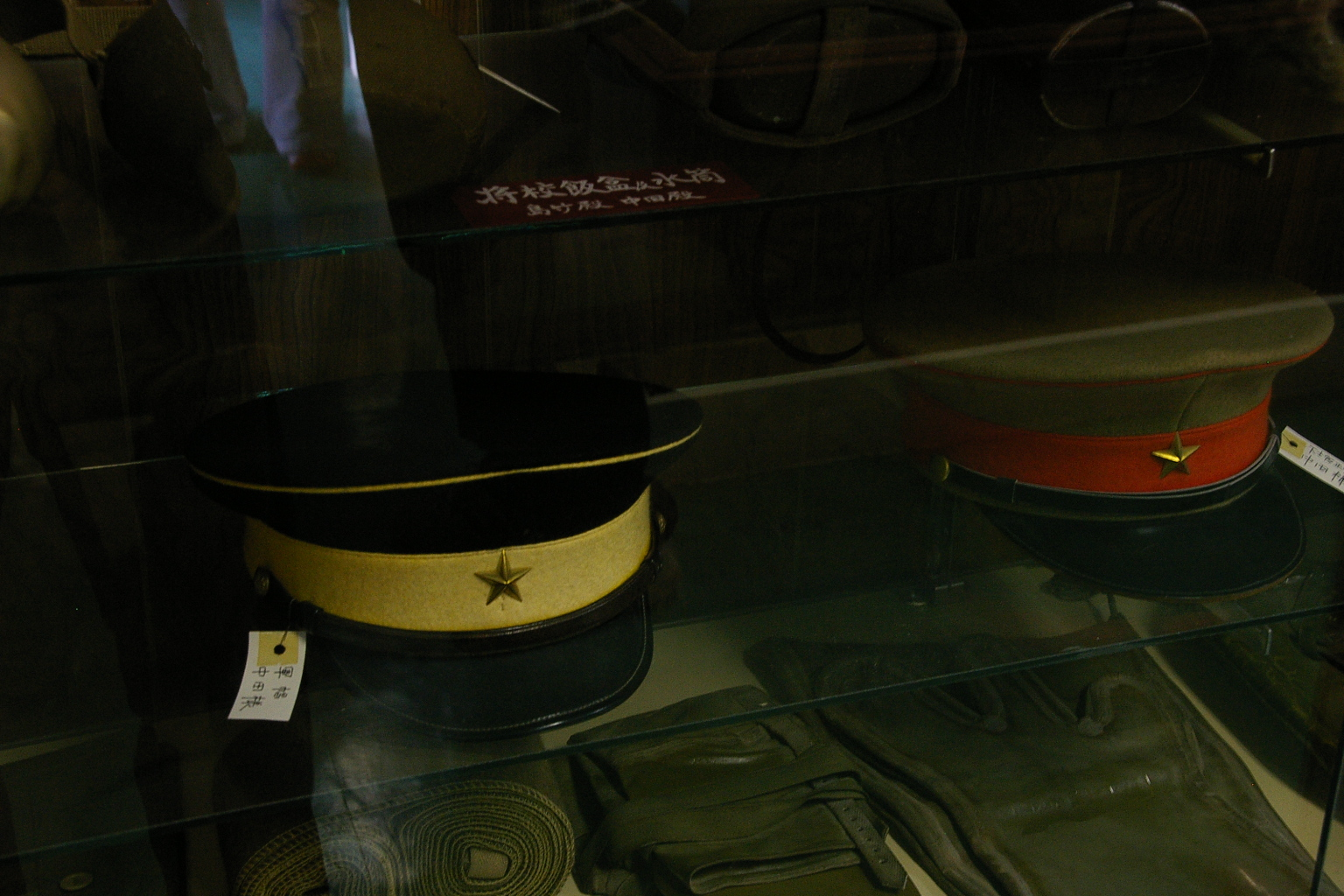
IJA service hat

The service cap was the main cap of the Japanese army from the 1880s all the way into the 1930s. The 1886 or Meiji 19 model was featured the dark blue crown and colored band depending on the branch. Regular infantry received yellow bands and Imperial Guard received red bands. The Type 45 olive service cap is a peaked cap similar in shape to that of the United States Army but with a smaller flatter crown and shorter visor. Red piping runs along the outer edge of the crown and the headband has a 1 1/2 inch wide red felt band. At the front of the red band is a gold star. The Imperial Guard service hat has a semicircular wreath of leaves below the star. The visor and chin strap are of black leather in standard military design.

=== Field cap ===
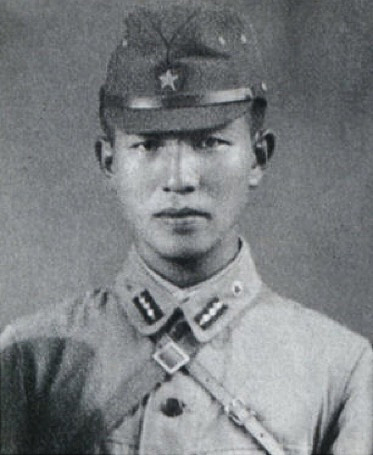
Japanese holdout, Hiroo Onoda, wearing the Sen-bou.

The Ryaku-bou(略帽) is a cloth field cap. Originally produced in khaki it was later produced in various shades of green ranging from grey-green to a dark green. The cap was more of a peaked sidecap and could be worn with a neck flap (Bou-tare), hooked to the bottom for sun protection, made from four cloth rectangles. An adjustment lace is fitted through four grommets at the rear.

Additionally, there was an “Ersatz” cap introduced in the 30’s made of felt and they were mostly seen being used in China. They fell out of use in to the 40’s.

=== Metal helmets ===
- Adrian helmet – As with many countries, the IJA adopted and produced the French Adrian helmet. The IJA version of the Adrian was a one piece helmet unlike that of the French version. In addition, the IJA Adrian featured tie chin straps similar to samurai kabuto fasteners. Later versions featured the star insignia in front of the helmet. It also featured a star shaped vent on the top of the helmet.
- "Sakura" helmet – A further improvement of the IJA Adrian. It featured a Sakura shaped vent cover on top of the vent holes above the helmet in order to prevent water and dirt from leaking into the helmet onto the soldiers' heads.

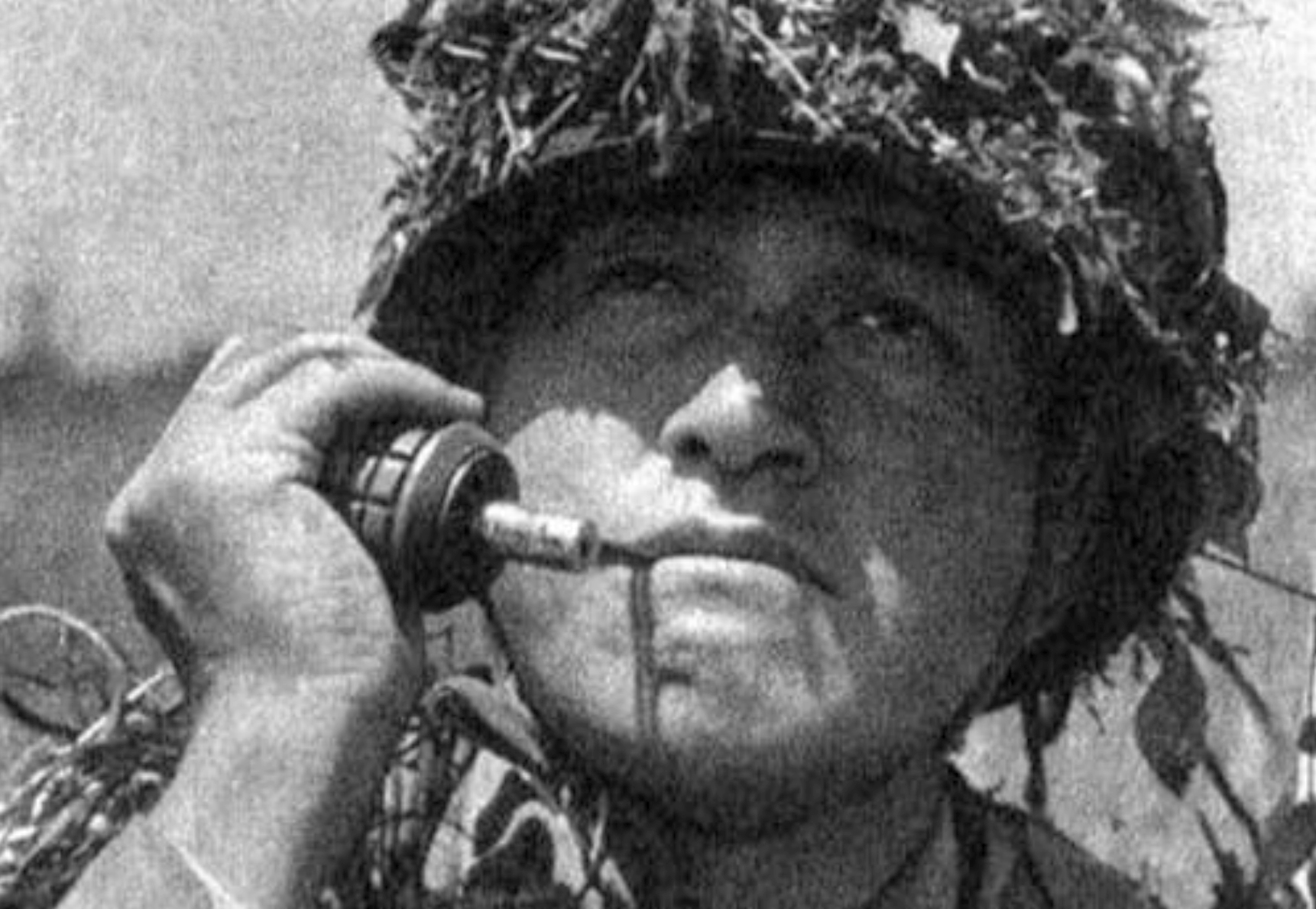
An IJA soldier wearing Type 90 helmet

- Type 90 – The Adrian helmet was later replaced by a Japanese designed helmet called the Type 90 (1930). It was officially called tetsubo (steel cap) but was called tetsukabuto ("steel helmet") by troops. It was made in the shape of a dome with a short protruding rim all the way around it (the paratroop version only had a short brim in the front). This helmet was made of a thin inferior chrome-molybdenum steel with many proving to be very fragile, being easily pierced by shrapnel and/or gunfire. A star (or anchor for the IJN) was soldered to the front and the helmet and star were painted mustard khaki. They were sometimes whitewashed in the winter. A tan, khaki or olive-green two layer, fiber reinforced linen cover was available with a yellow star sewn on the front. The helmet was secured to the head by an elaborate set of straps descended from those of the Kabuto samurai helmet. It was also able to be worn over a reversed field cap. Camouflage nets were widely worn over the helmet especially in the Southern theatre and Pacific island campaign.

=== Tropical helmets ===
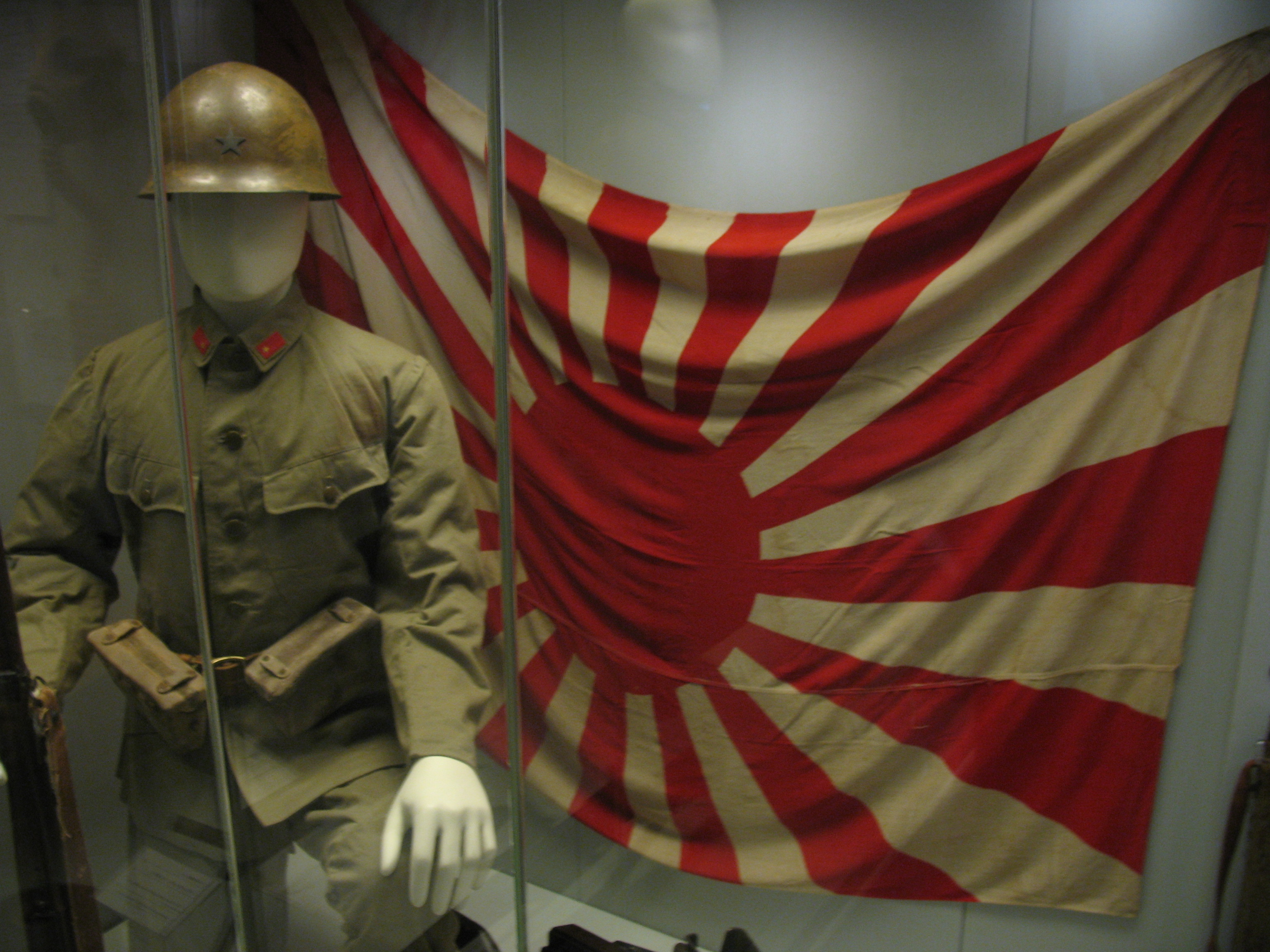
Type 90 helmet with uniform

The IJA issued various tropical helmets to its troops:

  - Model 1923 - The first sun helmet issued to troops. It began development in 1921 and was released 2 years following. The liner was comparable to that of German piths in the second world war, using a zigzag spacer as insulation between the sweatband and helmet shell. A pair of three ventilation grommets was present on each side, and the helmet was produced in 3 sizes. The shell was initially fashioned from the leaves of the Tahitian Screwpine. The official model designation, if one exists, is unknown, and it is thereof referred to as "Model 1923".
  - Shōwa Type 5 - The helmet in itself was not vastly different from the Model 1923. Instead of a third vent grommet on each side, a covered vent was added to the top, and the shell was woven with Pandanus and Taiwanese marsh grass. A metal star was fixed to the front and was only produced in one size.
  - Type 98, came in three main patterns:
    - Pattern 1 - A new pith model introduced in 1938. Regulation expanded the list of material for shell manufacture, now including bamboo. The design of the helmet was redesigned to be adjusted for use over the Type 90 steel helmet. For use over the steel helmet, the size adjustment cord was removed, then drawn through eyelets on the inside of the pith and through the chinstrap rings of the steel helmet. The same ventilation elements from the Shōwa 5 Type were present in this pattern, along with a metal star fixed to the front.
    - Pattern 2 - The second pattern of the Type 98 pith helmet, made to accommodate for material shortages. The only vastly notable change is the elimination of the vent grommets on the side, leaving only the shaft on the top.
    - Pattern 3 - The third and final pattern of the Type 98 pith helmet, made to accommodate for a severe lack of raw material. The vent shaft on top was eliminated, the metal star was changed into one of woven fabric, and the chinstrap changed in design for use of cloth size adjustment clips rather than metal. This is the most notable variant of the Type 98 pith, and the one with the most variation. Interior could be made with a variety of materials, including Sanada tape and straw. Material shortages led to variation in colour and fabric, labelled "B Spec" items; for example, white piths which are mistakenly often regarded as officer items, despite simply being the result of material compromises and nothing else.

== Other items ==
=== Clothing ===
The IJA also issued the following uniform items:

- single-breasted cloaks, over coats, capes and raincoats with hoods in khaki.
- Jyuban/Underwear – Jyuban are a part of the soldier's uniform as they were to be worn under the soldier's tunic and trousers. Jyuban were worn under the standard uniform as part of army regulation. White cotton jyuban were initially issued but then when a light-khaki (tan) was adopted, they were adapted as a work uniform. An olive-green version of the white fatigues was issued late in the Pacific War. An anti-heat jyuban was adopted and featured 3/4 sleeves and a collar.
- Bousyo-i/Tropical – The tropical cotton uniform, a design similar to the M98, was initially available in tan or light khaki, but was superseded later in the Pacific War by versions in medium to dark green. It featured open collars, buttoned side-vent flaps below the armpits, and pleated patch or internal pockets with flaps. Trousers could be full-length, 3/4 length, or a loose fitting breeches style pantaloon. Troops in the Pacific islands usually wore knee-length shorts with a lightweight cotton shirt which had three front buttons, 3/4-length sleeves and patch breast-pockets with flaps. Officers wore a short- or long-sleeved lightweight white (or off-white) tropical shirt with the green trousers, and when they wore the green tropical tunic they usually wore the shirt collar outside and over the tunic collar.
- Kessenfuku (決戦服/戦時服 (Decisive battle uniform) – Introduced in 1945 the kessenfuku was meant for use defending the home islands if and when invaded. It consisted of a waist-length jacket with two hidden slash breast pockets, and two internal pockets with flaps. It also had a fold-down collar and reinforced elbows. Cheaper materials were used in fabrication with many variations in material and color. Both winter and summer weight variants were produced.
- Imperial Guard – Until 1939 the Cavalry of the Imperial Guard wore a French-style parade uniform consisting of a dark-blue tunic with red Brandenburg braiding, a red kepi and red breeches. The red kepi had a white plume with a red base. Off-duty members wore a dark blue tunic with 5 rows of black mohair froggings and dark blue breeches with a red stripe down each seam. Prior to the general adoption of khaki by the Japanese Army after the Russo-Japanese War of 1904–1905, an all-white linen uniform had been worn in hot weather. The Infantry of the Imperial Guard wore a dark blue uniform with white leggings for both parade and service wear until 1905. It was distinguished from that of the line infantry by a red band and piping on the peaked service-cap (instead of yellow). Following the adoption of a khaki service-dress the Guard Infantry wore this on all occasions. In the field the army's basic uniform was worn. It was worn with either a chrysanthemum or a star in a wreath.

=== Accessories ===
- Senninbari were red-sash 1,000 stitch belts worn around the waist of uniforms. They were supposed to bring good luck, confer courage, and make the wearer immune to bullets.
- Hachimaki (鉢巻) is a stylized headband (bandana) in Japanese culture, usually made of red or white cloth, and worn as a symbol of perseverance or effort by the wearer.
- Shin guntō – The shin guntō (新軍刀?, "New Army Sword") was a weapon and badge of rank used by the Imperial Japanese Army between 1935 and 1945.

== See also ==
- Ranks of the Imperial Japanese Army
