= Comfort bag =

An illustrated example of comfort bag

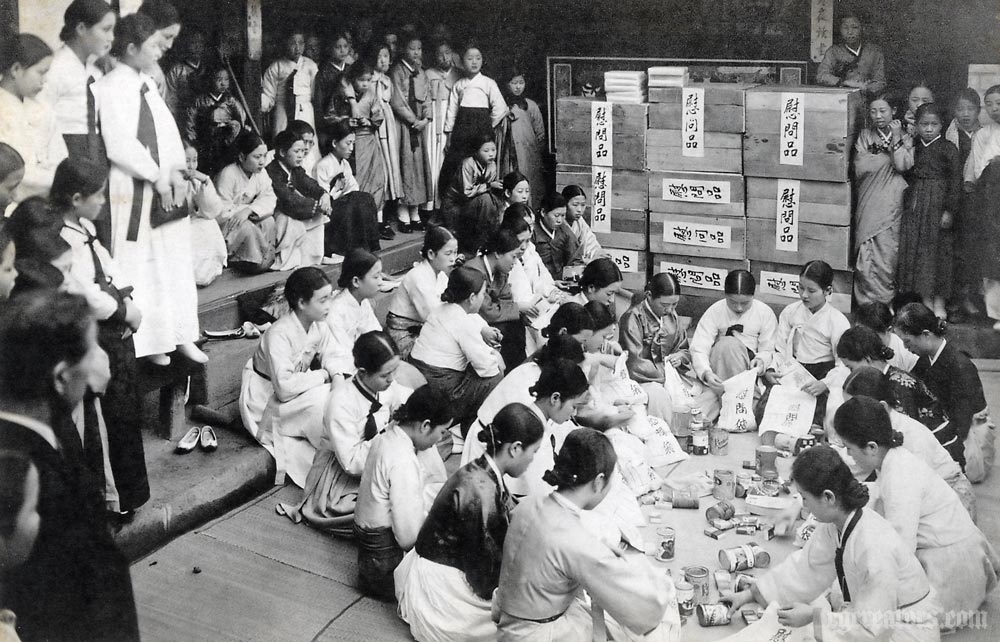
Korean women are putting comfort articles into comfort bags.

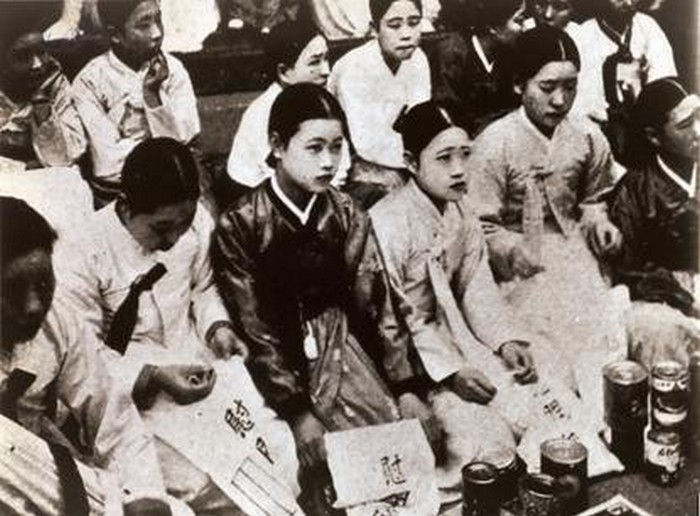
Korean schoolgirls holding comfort bags before putting items in front of them into the bags

Comfort bag (慰問袋, imon-bukuro) was a gift packet prepared by civilians to be sent to Imperial Japanese Military soldiers for the purpose of encouraging them. The bag contains comfort articles (慰問品, imon-hin) not issued by the Japanese Military, such as toiletries, dried fruits, canned foods, and letters of encouragement. Bags were prepared by schoolgirls or local patriotic women's societies (Greater Japan Women's National Defense Association). Comfort bags were also sold commercially, even in upscale supermarkets and marketed in cosmetic magazines to wider consumer market. These activities were also made in Korea, which was then under Japanese rule, to encourage Korean soldiers in the Imperial Japanese Military.

== Comfort dolls ==
Comfort bags were traditionally prepared by women in the territories that Japan occupied during World War II. Among the items in the bags, the comfort doll became significant to many Japanese soldiers. One account describes a soldier fighting in China holding onto a comfort doll, given to him by a young Japanese girl, until he was killed. His fellow soldiers then preserved the doll and even redressed it with clothes created by that same young girl. The soldier, Obayashi, had no family to send him letters or extra supplies, so he relied heavily on the government distributed comfort bags. The doll became incredibly important to him as it represented a mother or a little sister that he is missing from his real life. Much like Obayashi, other soldiers also found comfort within the comfort dolls. They would give them names, dress them in pretty clothes, and treat them as objects of affection. There are theories that the reason why comfort dolls were so popular was because of the isolation that the soldiers felt when they were fighting overseas on foreign territory. The dolls provided a reference of the feminine, promoting ideas of heterosexuality and served to remind the soldiers of the Japanese women back at home.

== Parallel to Comfort women ==
Comfort bags were packed not only by Japanese women, but also by women in Japanese occupied territory. These comfort women quickly came to serve a similar function to the dolls they made, because they offered a glimpse of the feminine for the soldiers fighting on the front lines. Similarly to the dolls and the comfort bags, the women were described as "imperial gifts" by the Japanese government, and were meant to serve as a reward for the men's contributions in the war. Over time, comfort women were regarded as an essential military resource, and were seen simply as materials rather than individuals. Many were given Japanese names to replace their own, as it would be more comfortable for the soldiers to interact with women with Japanese names. They could be reminded of their lives at home, at the expense of the dehumanization of these women. Comfort women were not seen as people, but rather, like the contents of a comfort bag, they are a resource meant to provide support for the troops and to keep their morale up during the war.

== See also ==
- Senninbari
