= Good Luck Flag =

Traditional gift for Japanese servicemen

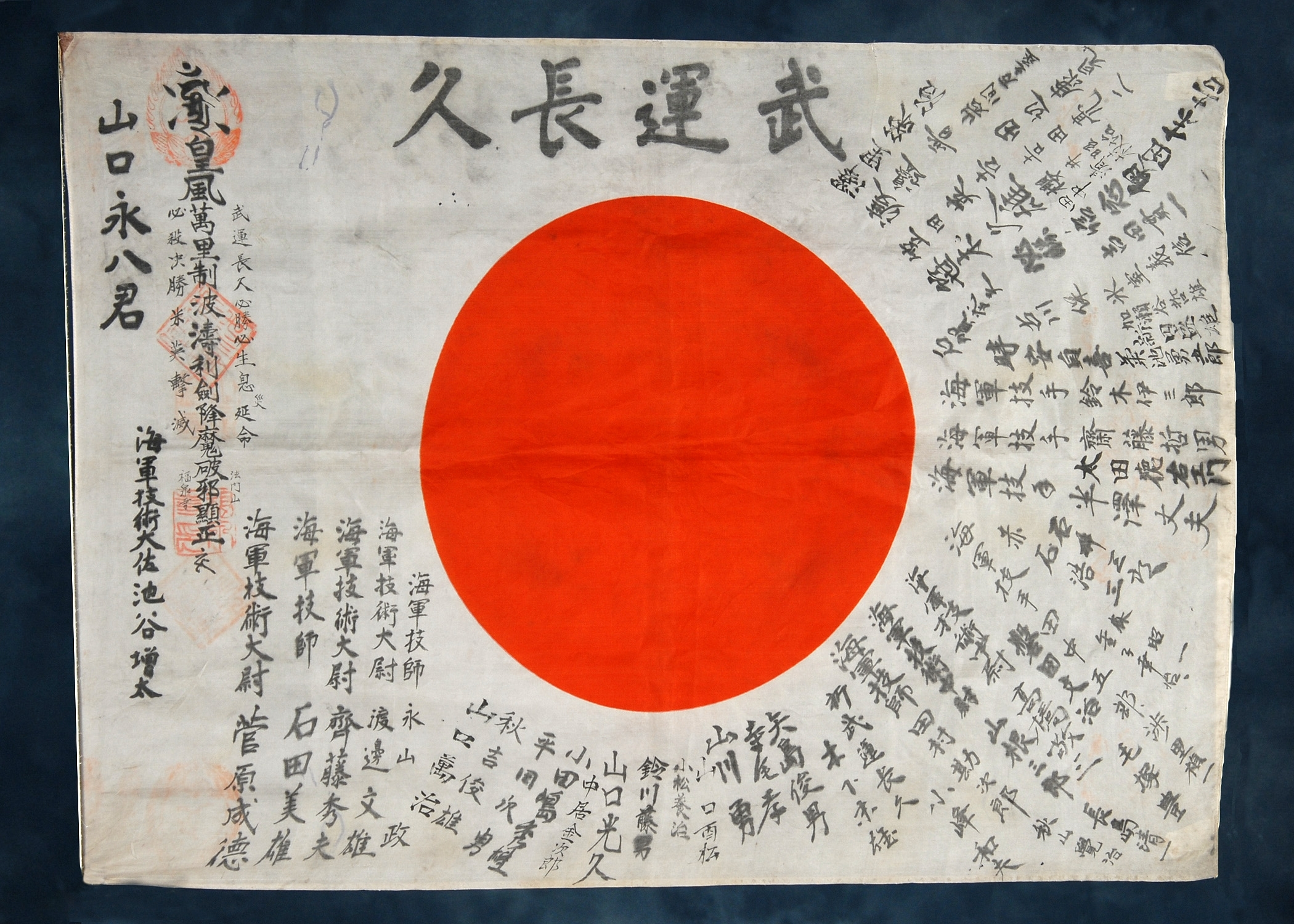
Signed hinomaru belonging to Japanese soldier Eihachi Yamaguchi

The Good Luck Flag (寄せ書き日の丸, yosegaki hinomaru) was a traditional gift for Japanese servicemen deployed during the military campaigns of the Empire of Japan, most notably during World War II. The flag was typically a national flag signed by friends and family, often with short messages wishing the soldier victory, safety and good luck. Today, hinomaru are used for occasions such as charity and sporting events.

The name 'hinomaru' is taken from the name for the flag of Japan, also known as hinomaru, which translates literally as "circular sun". When yosegaki hinomaru were signed by friends and relatives, the text written on the flag was generally written in a vertical formation radiating out from the central red circle, resembling the sun's rays. This appearance is referenced in the term 'yosegaki' (lit., "collection of writing"), meaning that the term 'yosegaki hinomaru' can be interpreted as a "collection of writing around the red sun", describing the appearance of text radiating outwards from the circle in the centre of the flag.

== History ==
The hinomaru yosegaki was traditionally presented to a man prior to his induction into the Japanese armed forces or before his deployment. The relatives, neighbors, friends, and co-workers of the person receiving the flag would write their names, good luck messages, exhortations, or other personal messages onto the flag in a formation resembling rays dissipating from the sun, though text was also written on any available space if the flag became crowded with messages. On some occasions, small caricatures or cartoons were added to the flag. In rare instances, elaborate and impressive art might also be placed on the flag. Sometimes good luck flags were decorated with images of black and white or colorful tigers.

Hinomaru normally featured some kind of exhortation written across the top of the white field, such as bu-un chō-kyu (武運長久, "May your military fortunes be long lasting"); other typical decoration includes medium-sized characters along the right or left vertical margin of the flag, typically the name of the man receiving the flag, and the name of the individual or organization presenting it to him. The text written on the flag was commonly applied with a calligraphy brush and ink. While it was normally the custom to sign only around the red center of the flag, some examples may be found with characters written upon the red center as well.

The origin of the custom of writing on flags is unclear, with some debate as to the time period when the custom first began. Some sources indicate that signed flags became part of a soldier's possessions, alongside a "thousand stitch belt" (senninbari), during the First Sino-Japanese War (1894–1895), though good luck flags predating the Manchurian Incident (1931) are considered rare. It is generally agreed that most hinomaru yosegaki seen today come from just before or during the period of the Second Sino-Japanese War (1937–1945).

For the military man stationed far away from home and loved ones, the hinomaru yosegaki offered communal hopes and prayers to the owner every time the flag was unfolded. It was believed that the flag, with its many signatures and slogans, would provide a combined force or power to see its owner through tough times, as well as reminding the soldier of his duties in the war, with the implication that the performance of that duty meant that the warrior was not expected to return home from battle. Often, departing servicemen would leave behind clipped fingernails and hair, so that his relatives would have something of him in which to hold a funeral.

The belief of self-sacrifice was central to Japanese culture during World War II, forming much of wartime sentiment. It was culturally believed that great honour was brought upon the family of those whose sons, husbands, brothers and fathers died in service to the country and the Emperor, and that in doing one's duty, any soldier, sailor or aviator would offer up his life freely. As part of the cultural samurai or bushido (way of the warrior) code, this worldview was brought forward into twentieth century Japan from the previous centuries of feudal Japan, and was impressed upon twentieth century soldiers, most of whom descended from non-samurai families.

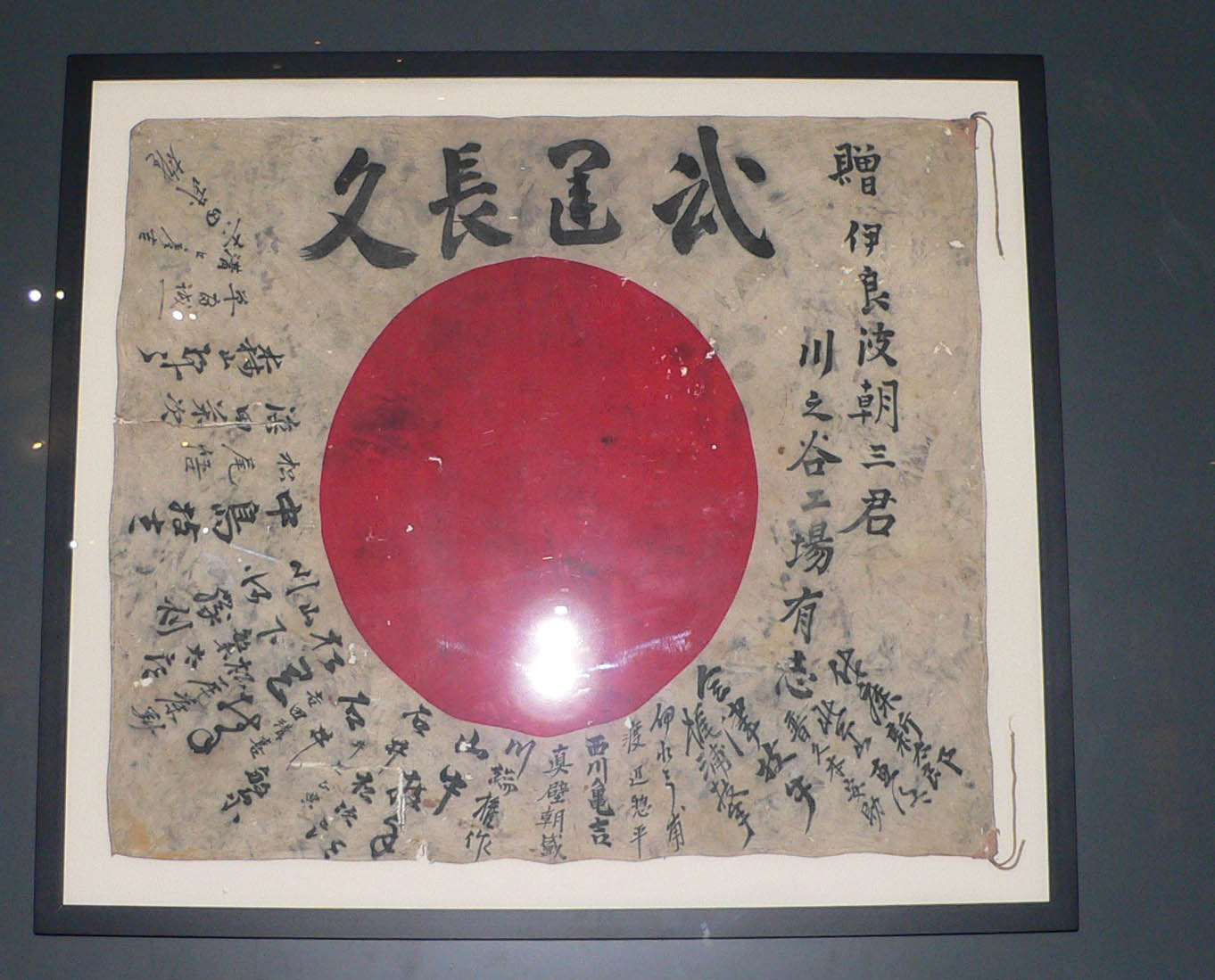
Japanese soldiers often carried personal flags, signed by friends and neighbors, as a patriotic symbol. This flag was captured during the Battle for Guam.

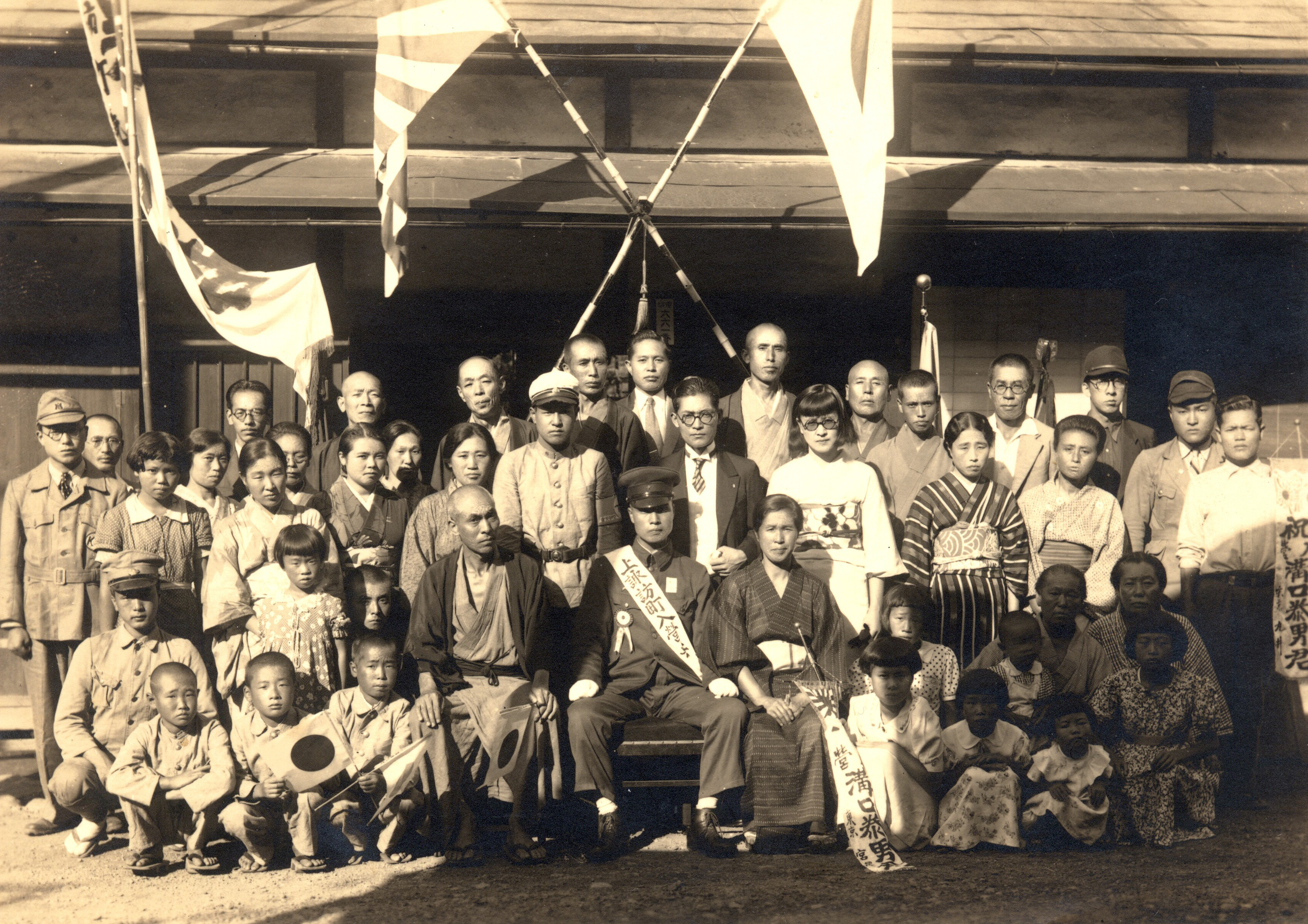
1930s photo of a military enrollment. The hinomaru is displayed on the house and held by several children.

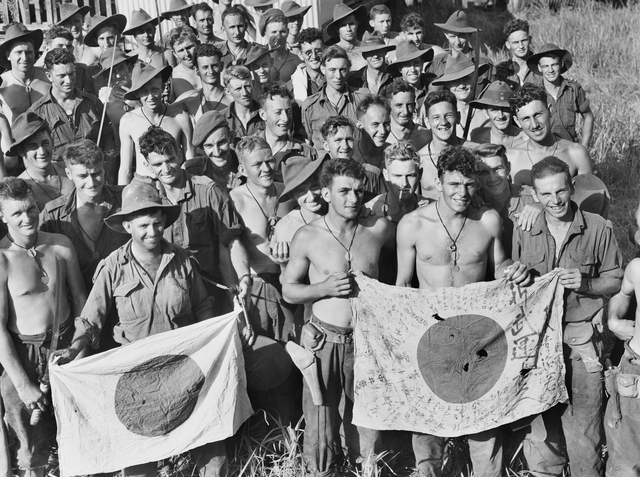
Soldiers of the Australian Army's 2/6th Independent Company display Good Luck Flags they captured during the Battle of Kaiapit on 26 September 1943.

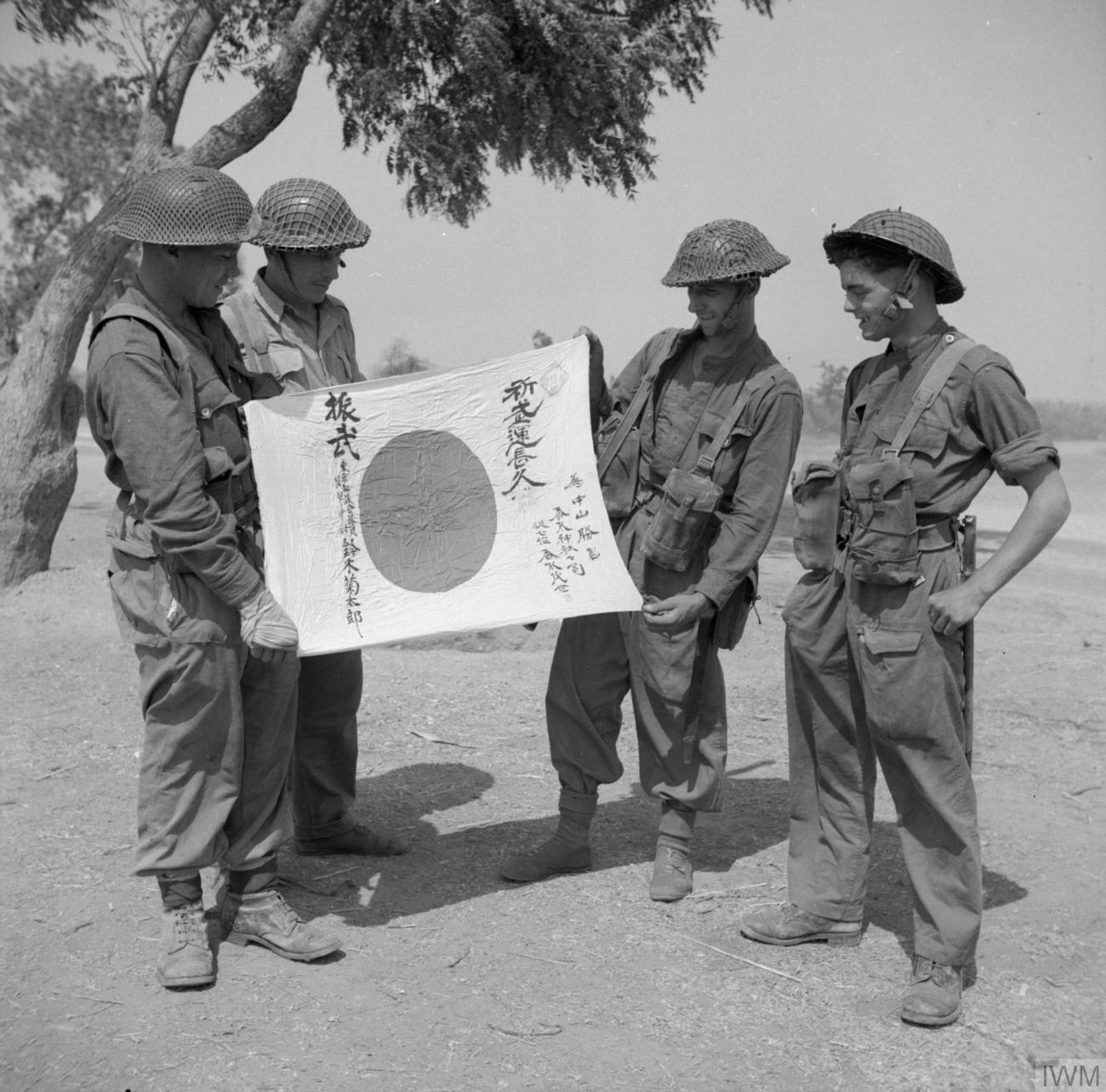
Four soldiers of the British Army's Worcestershire Regiment display a Good Luck Flag captured on Mount Popa during the mop-up operations that took place after the capture of Mandalay.

=== U.S. veterans' accounts ===
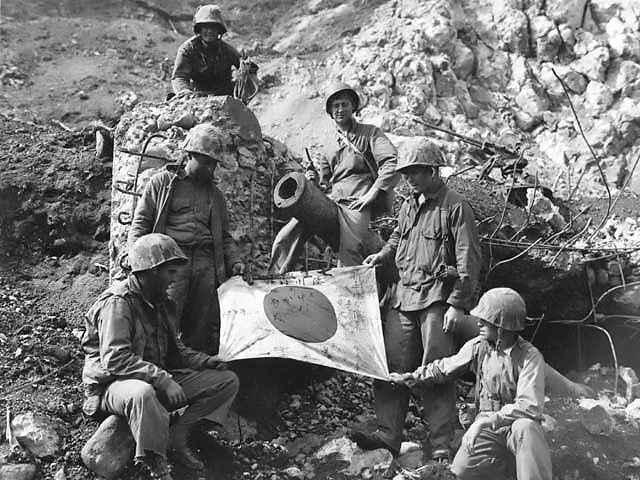
U.S Marines capture a Japanese flag on Iwo Jima.

In Sid Phillips's book, You'll Be Sor-ree, Phillips describes the role of Japanese flags in the Pacific War: "Every Jap seemed to have a personal silk flag with Jap writing all over it and a large meatball in the center." There are numerous books describing hinomaru as souvenirs taken home by U.S. Marines and members of the U.S. Army Infantry. Another example is found in Eugene Sledge's book, With the Old Breed: "The men gloated over, compared, and often swapped their prizes. It was a brutal, ghastly ritual the likes of which have occurred since ancient times on battlefields where antagonists have possessed a profound mutual hatred." In a 2008 article in the Monroe News, a World War II veteran spoke of his experiences bringing back a flag from the Pacific War, stating that he did not search every Japanese soldier he shot, as there was usually not enough time; the flag he eventually brought home was found on the island of Mindanao in the Philippines. According to his experiences, soldiers did not take home large souvenirs, such as katanas, for fear that someone would steal it, but a flag could be easily concealed. The flag he himself took as a souvenir was in the process of repatriation, with Dr. Yasuhiko Kaji searching for the owner and their family in Japan.

=== Effort to return flags ===
The OBON SOCIETY (formerly OBON 2015) is a non-profit affiliate organization with a mission to return hinomaru to their families in Japan.

The society's work has been recognized by Japan's Minister for Foreign Affairs as an "important symbol of reconciliation, mutual understanding, and friendship between our two countries". As of 2022, the society has returned more than 400 flags, and has more than 400 other flags they are currently working on returning. On 15 August 2017, the society arranged for Marvin Strombo, a 93-year-old American WWII veteran, to travel back to Japan to return the flag he took to the family of the man who made it. The effort to return the flags is widely seen as a humanitarian act providing closure for family members.

=== Preservation and restoration ===
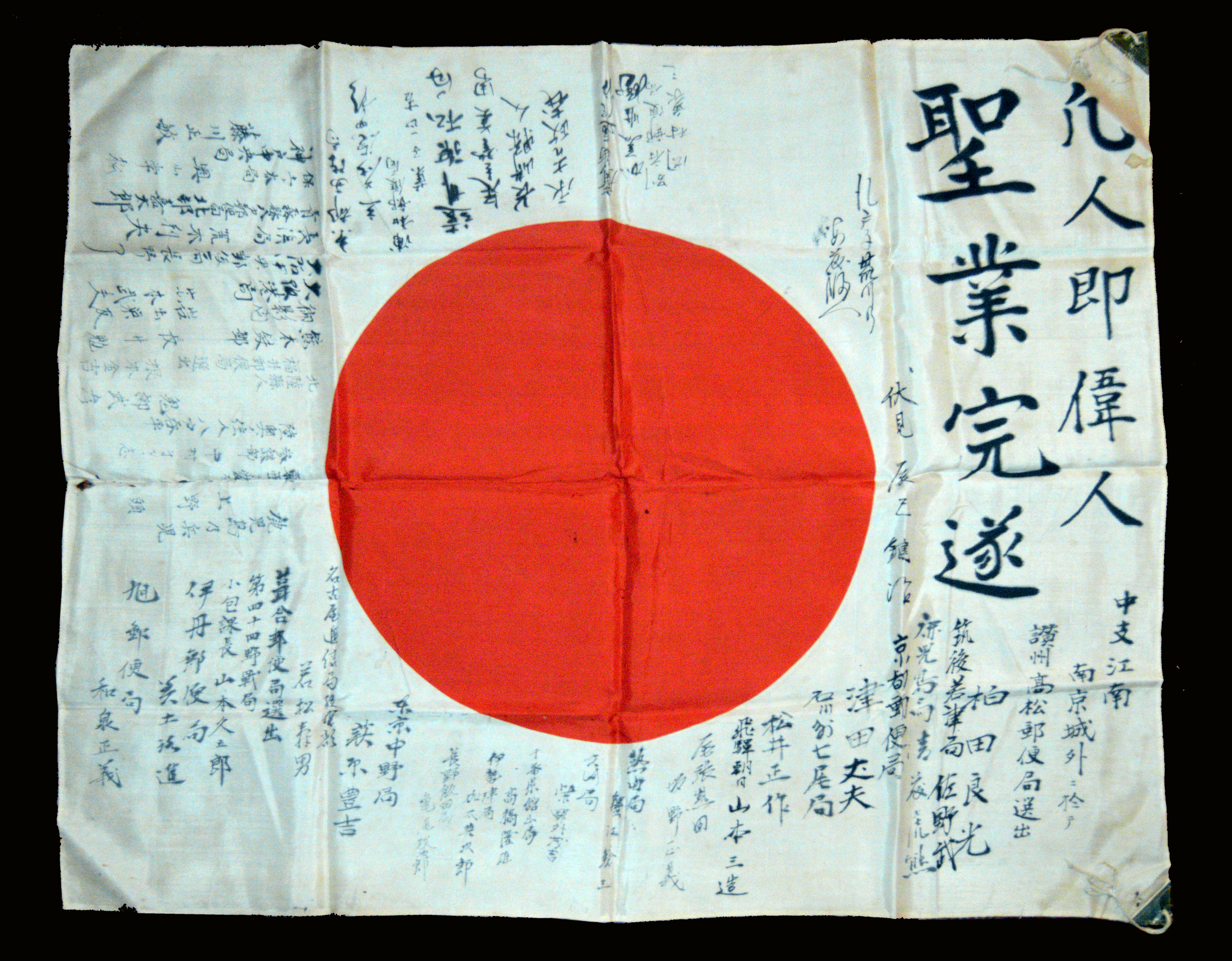
A well-preserved WWII Japanese silk Good Luck flag

The United States' National World War II Museum has published a preservation guide with a list of recommendations for storing and preserving synthetic materials and textiles, such as many of the hinomaru produced in previous wars, recommending that they are stored in climate controlled areas, kept away from bright lights, and mounted on a backing material for display.

== Modern use ==
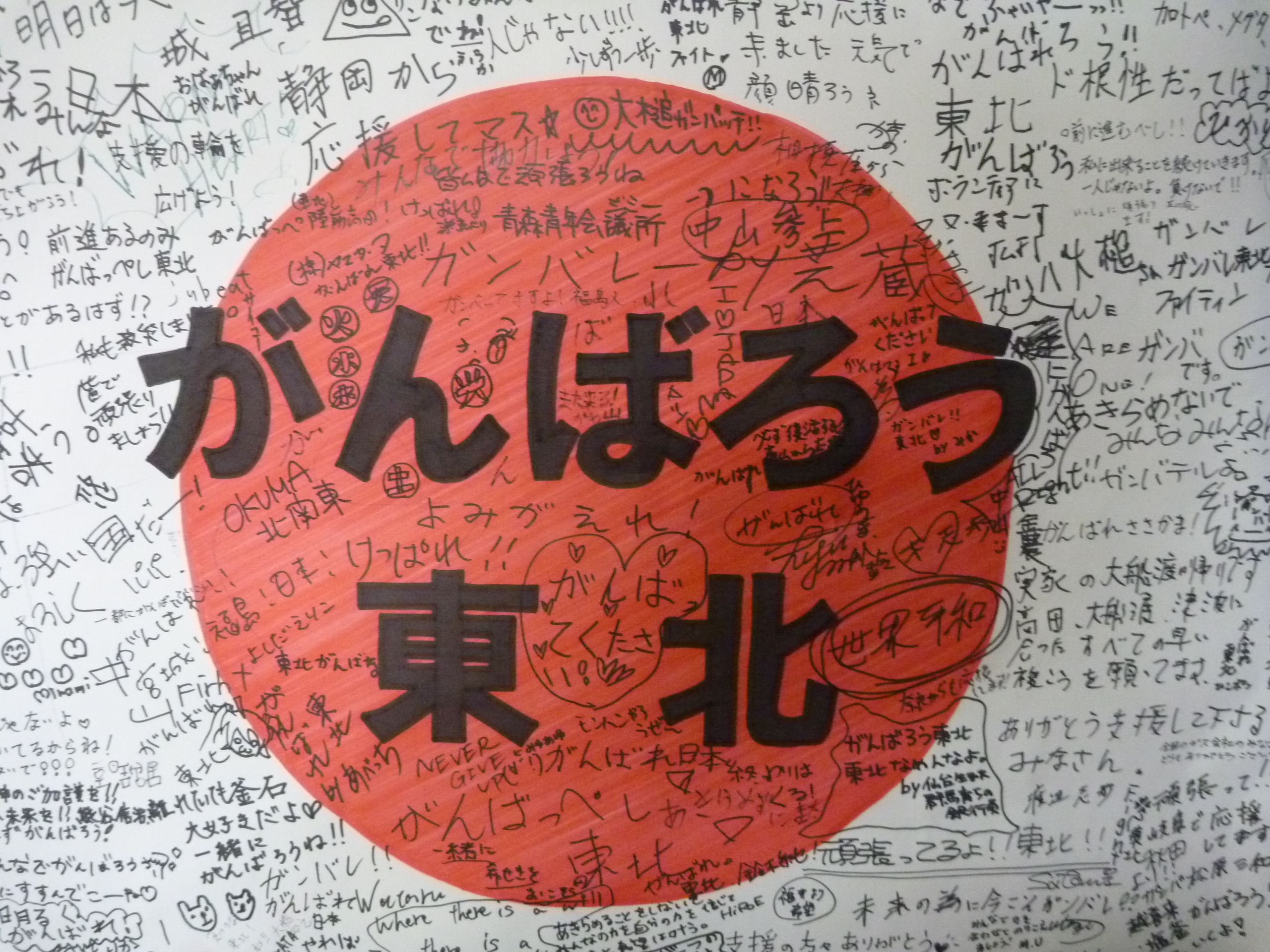
Notes by people after the 2011 Tōhoku Earthquake and tsunami

In modern times, yosegaki hinomaru are still used, with the tradition of signing the hinomaru as a good luck charm continuing, though in a limited fashion. The yosegaki hinomaru is often shown at international sporting events to support the national Japanese team. The yosegaki (寄せ書き, "group effort flag") is used for campaigning soldiers, athletes, retirees, transfer students and for friends. In modern Japan, it is given as a present to a person at a send-off party, for athletes, a farewell party for colleagues or transfer students, for graduation and retirement. After natural disasters such as the 2011 Tōhoku Earthquake and tsunami, people commonly write notes on a yosegaki hinomaru to show support. The trend of yosegaki had recently spread to flags of other countries with documented cases of writings on the flag of Brazil, the flag of Canada, the flag of the Czech Republic, the flag of Iran, the flag of Mongolia, the flag of South Korea and the flag of the United States.

== See also ==
- Hachimaki – Japanese headband
- Senninbari – Belt given to Japanese men going to war as an amulet

== General and cited references ==
- Bortner, Michael A. (2008). Imperial Japanese Good Luck Flags and One-Thousand Stitch Belts. Schiffer Military Books. ISBN 978-0764329272.
- Bortner, Michael A. (2021). Imperial Japanese Tiger Art Good Luck Flags of World War Two. Elm Grove Publishing. ISBN 978-1943492572.
- Takenaka, Yoshiharu (2003). 知っておきたい国旗・旗の基礎知識 [Flag Basics You Should Know] (in Japanese). Gifu Shimbun. ISBN 4-87797-054-1.
