= Senninbari =

Belt given to Japanese men going to war as an amulet

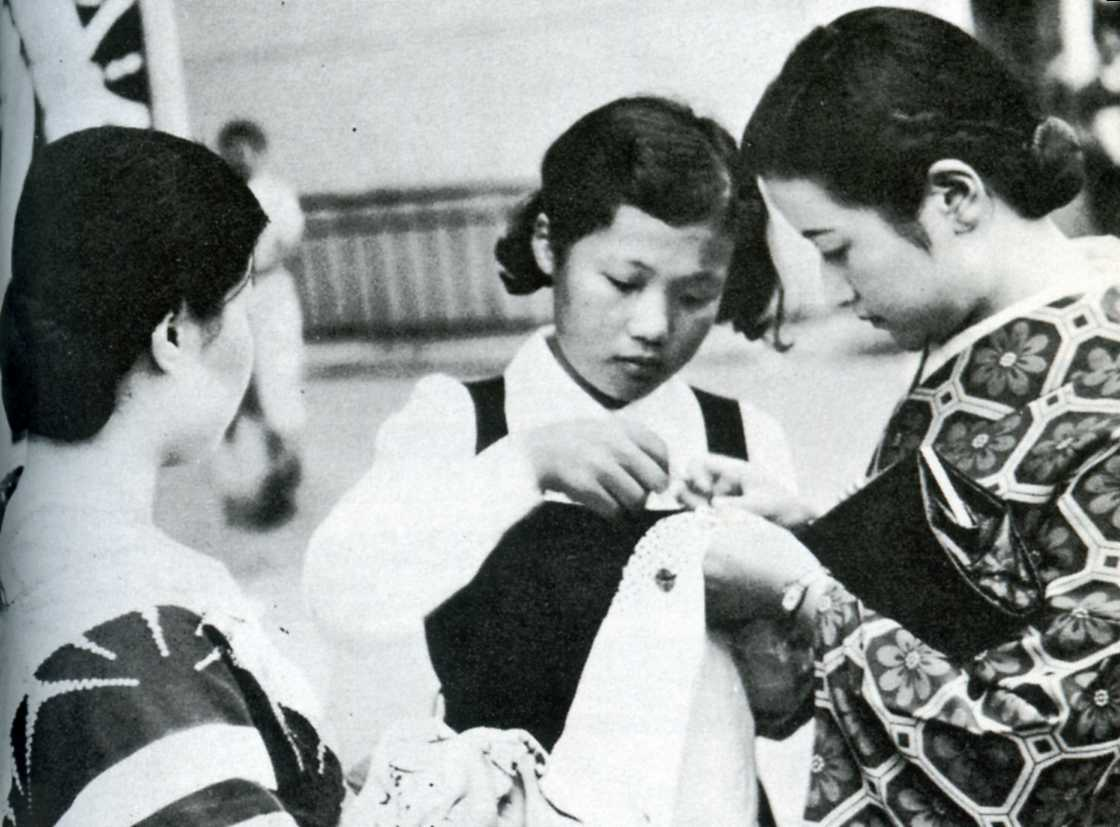
Women stitching senninbari for men going to war in China, 1937

A senninbari (千人針, 'thousand person stitches') or one thousand stitch is a belt or strip of cloth stitched 1,000 times and given as a Shinto amulet by Japanese women and imperial subjects to soldiers going away to war.

Senninbari were decorated with 1000 knots or stitches, and each stitch was normally made by a different woman. Senninbari were typically 15 centimetres (5.9 in) wide and ranged from 90 centimetres (3.0 ft) to 120 centimetres (3.9 ft) or more in length. Each end of the belt could feature strings, snaps or buttons that allowed it to be fastened around the waist; examples lacking these were often tucked into the waist. Very long types of senninbari, called tasuki, could be worn criss-cross fashion over the chest, shoulders and back. Other variations were never worn, but may have been folded and placed inside helmet liners, pockets or packs.

== Construction and variations ==
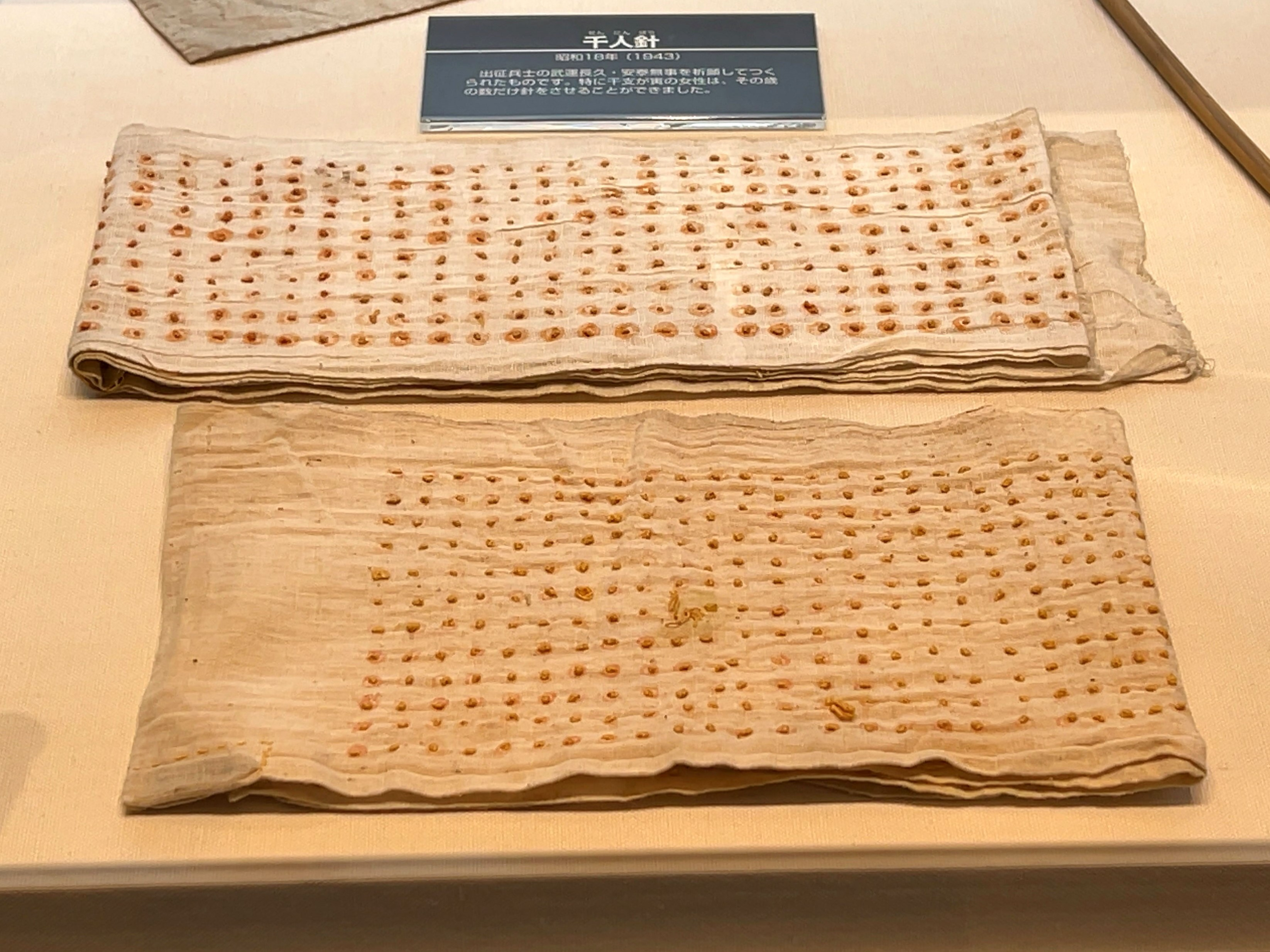
Two Senninbari at the Higashimurayama Furusato Museum

Senninbari were most commonly made from white cloth and embroidered with 1000 red stitches, as the combination of white and red was considered to be lucky and auspicious. Yellow, red and green cloth were also used, and were combined with various coloured threads (such as yellow, gold, red and white) used for the embroidery. The stitches were typically arranged in multiple rows, but were also arranged in formations creating patterns resembling images of flags, patriotic slogans, or tigers; the most common slogan stitched into senninbari was bu-un chō-kyū (武運長久) or "eternal good luck in war". Tigers stitched or painted onto senninbari were also common, as tigers were popularly known to be able to travel far away from home and return safely.

Senninbari took various forms, and were not limited exclusively to belts. Some senninbari were made to be used as hachimaki (headbands), as well as belts, vests and caps; the most uncommon forms of senninbari were good luck flags. Senninbari designed to be worn around the waist, known as senninbari haramaki (abdomen senninbari), were considered to maintain good health, as well as being good luck for the wearer.

== History ==
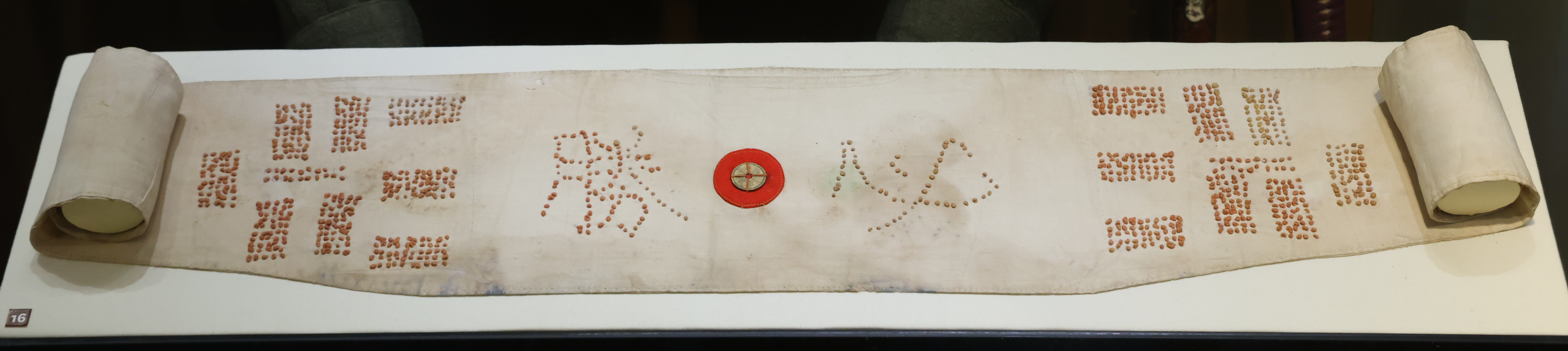
A Senninbari whose owner was killed during the Battle of Meiktila and Mandalay

The custom of producing senninbari originated during the First Sino-Japanese War of 1894–1895. In their earliest forms, senninbari were small handkerchief sized pieces of square material, containing 1000 knots or stitches embroidered to strengthen the material, the implication being that this strength was passed along to the man carrying it.

In general, senninbari and later varieties one thousand stitch belts were believed to confer courage, good luck and immunity from injury (especially bullets) to their wearers. Some Japanese soldiers rejected the belief that the senninbari could protect them from harm, instead believing that the amulet would allow them to inflict the greatest damage upon the enemy before offering their own lives up in battle. Others in the military wore the senninbari as a memento and a keepsake of the women who had given it to them.

== Production ==
Senninbari could be made by a soldier's mother, sister or wife, who would stand near their local temple, train station or department store and ask any female passerby to sew in a stitch or knot. During the height of WWII, women's organisations would gather to produce senninbari en masse in order to meet demand. These were then placed in imonbukuro, or comfort bags, and were sent overseas to soldiers.

According to tradition, any woman born in the year of the Tiger could sew either twelve stitches or a number of stitches identical to her age. Some belts were lined with the woman's hair, or the hair of multiple women, as an added form of protection, a custom that originated in folk beliefs on the island of Okinawa. Coins were also sewn into the belt for the perceived addition of protection.

== See also ==
- Good Luck Flag – Traditional gift for Japanese servicemen

== Bibliography ==
- Imperial Japanese Good Luck Flags and One-Thousand Stitch Belts by Dr Michael A. Bortner, 2008, Schiffer Military Books, ISBN 978-0-7643-2927-2
- Dower, John (1997). War Without Mercy: Race and Power in the Pacific War. Pantheon. ISBN 0-394-75172-8.
- Dower, John W (2002). Fighting Techniques of a Japanese Infantryman in World War II. Zenith Press. ISBN 0-7603-1145-5.
- 渡邉 Watanabe, 一弘 Kazuhiro. "戦時中の弾丸除け信仰に関する民俗学的研究 ～千人針習俗を中心に～" [Folklore studies on the belief in bullet protection during the war - Focusing on Senninbari customs -]. The Graduate University for Advanced Studies.
