= Hachimaki =

Japanese headband

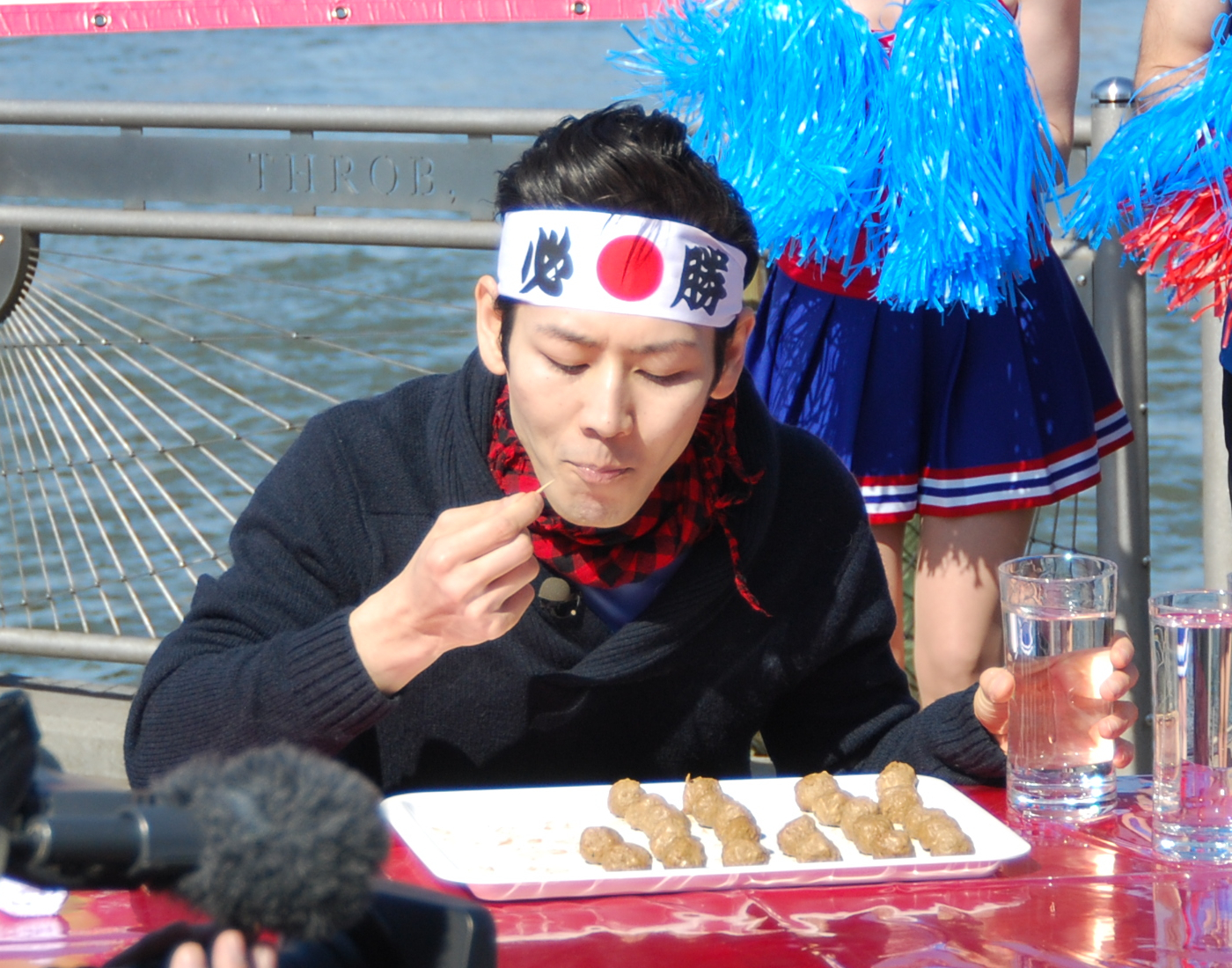
Takeru Kobayashi wearing a hachimaki in 2010

A hachimaki (鉢巻) (headband, lit. "helmet-scarf") is a type of Japanese headband, usually made of red or white cloth, typically featuring a design of kanji at the front.

== History ==
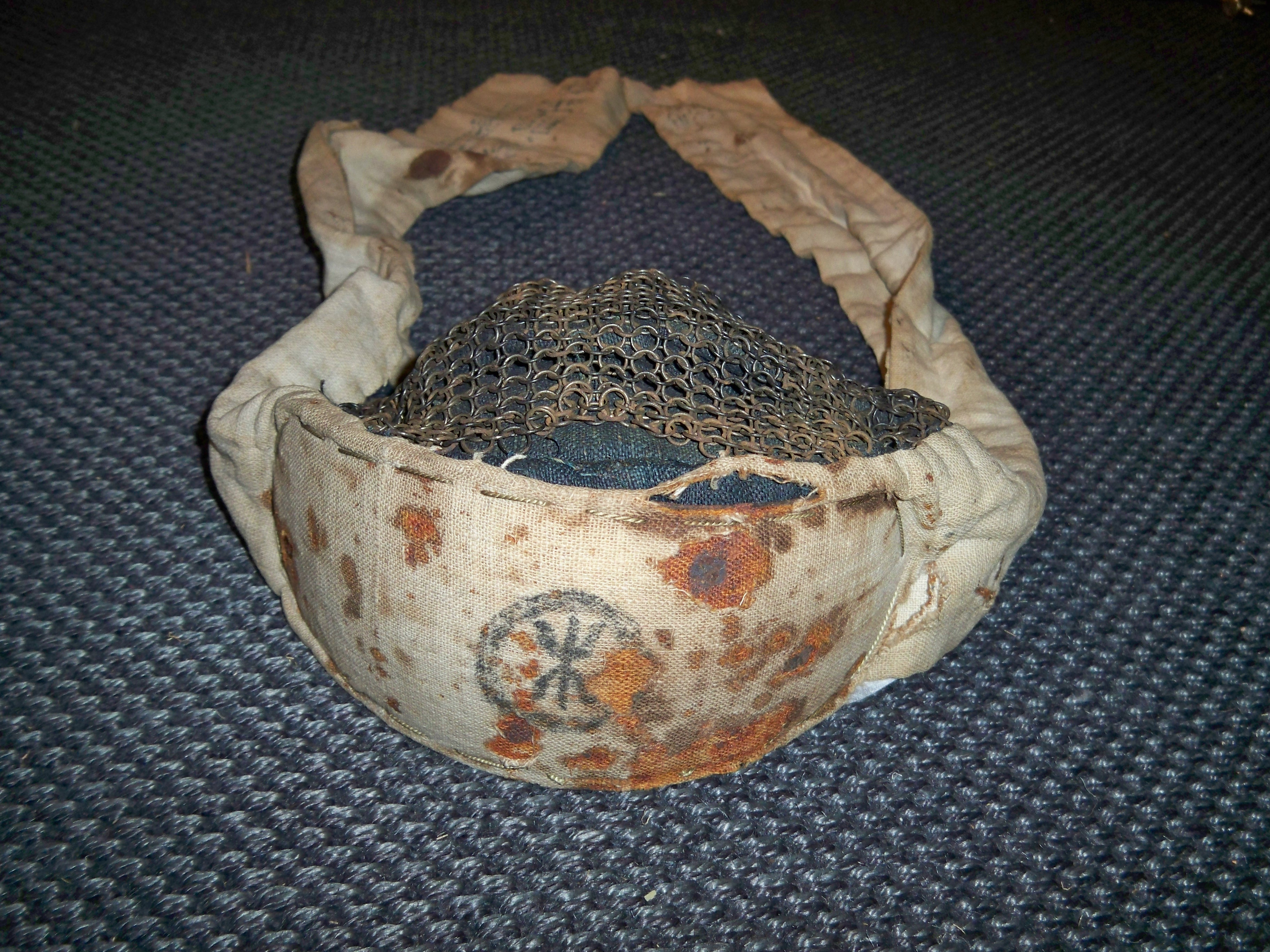
Hachi-gane/Hitai-ate armored headband worn to protect the forehead, particularly by samurai and shinobi. It can be made from a single metal plate, multiple plates joined together, or hardened leather, and was used for protection during duels, combat, and other occasions. The term "hachi-gane" literally means "forehead protector".

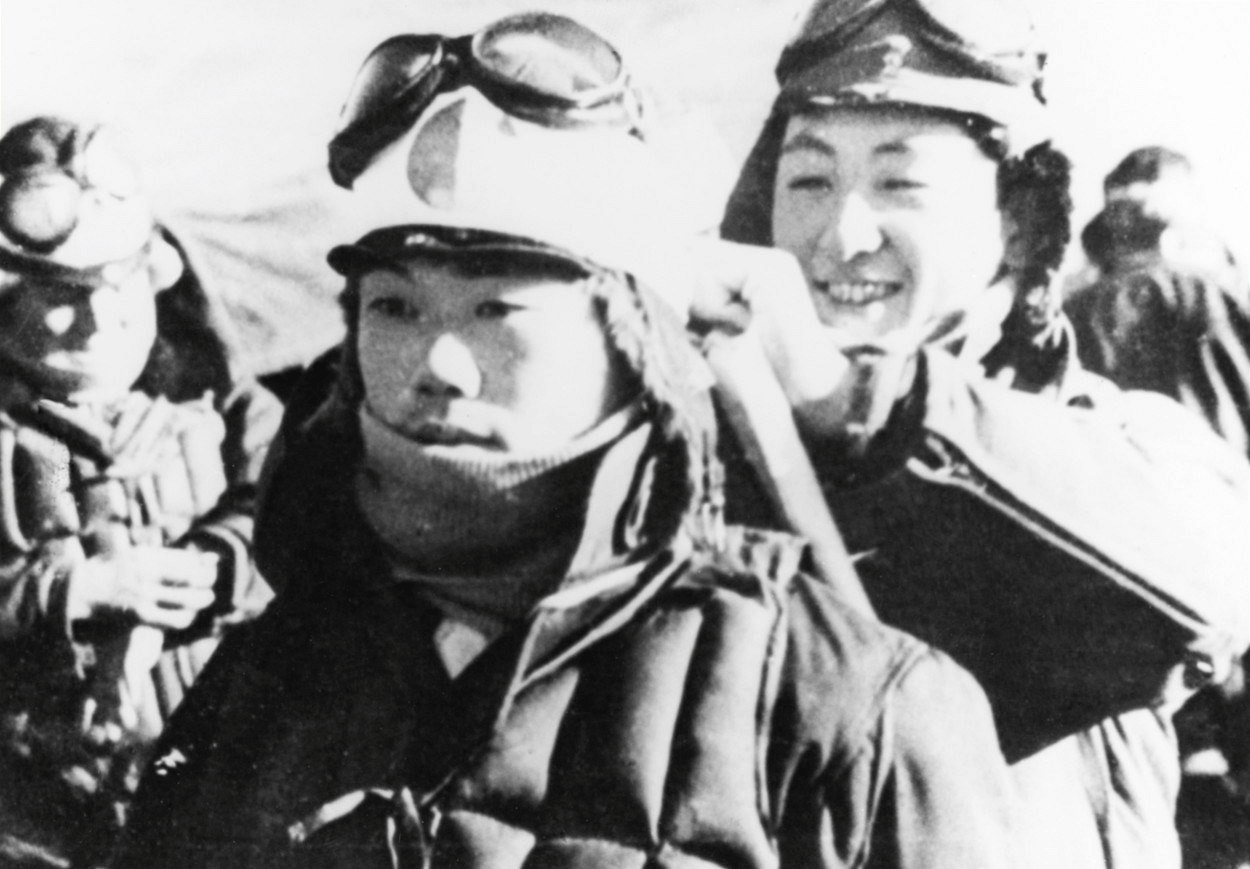
A kamikaze pilot receives a hachimaki before his final mission, 1945.

The origin of the hachimaki is uncertain, but the most common theory states that they originated as headbands used by samurai, worn underneath the kabuto to protect the wearer from cuts and to absorb sweat. Inspired by samurai, kamikaze pilots in World War II wore hachimaki while flying to their deaths.

In modern Japan, hachimaki are often emblazoned with slogans and red circles reminiscent of the flag of Japan. They serve the function of absorbing sweat during physical activity, so they are often worn by sportspeople. Hachimaki may be worn to showcase Japanese nationalism or sporting pride. They are also associated with the Bōsōzoku subculture in Japan. In Western popular culture, hachimaki are stereotypically associated with martial artists.

== See also ==
- Good Luck Flag – Traditional gift for Japanese servicemen
- Kerchief – Cloth tied around the head or neck; bandana
- Senninbari – Belt given to Japanese men going to war as an amulet
- Tenugui – Traditional Japanese multi-purpose cloth
