= Himeyuri Peace Museum =

- ひめゆり平和祈念資料館
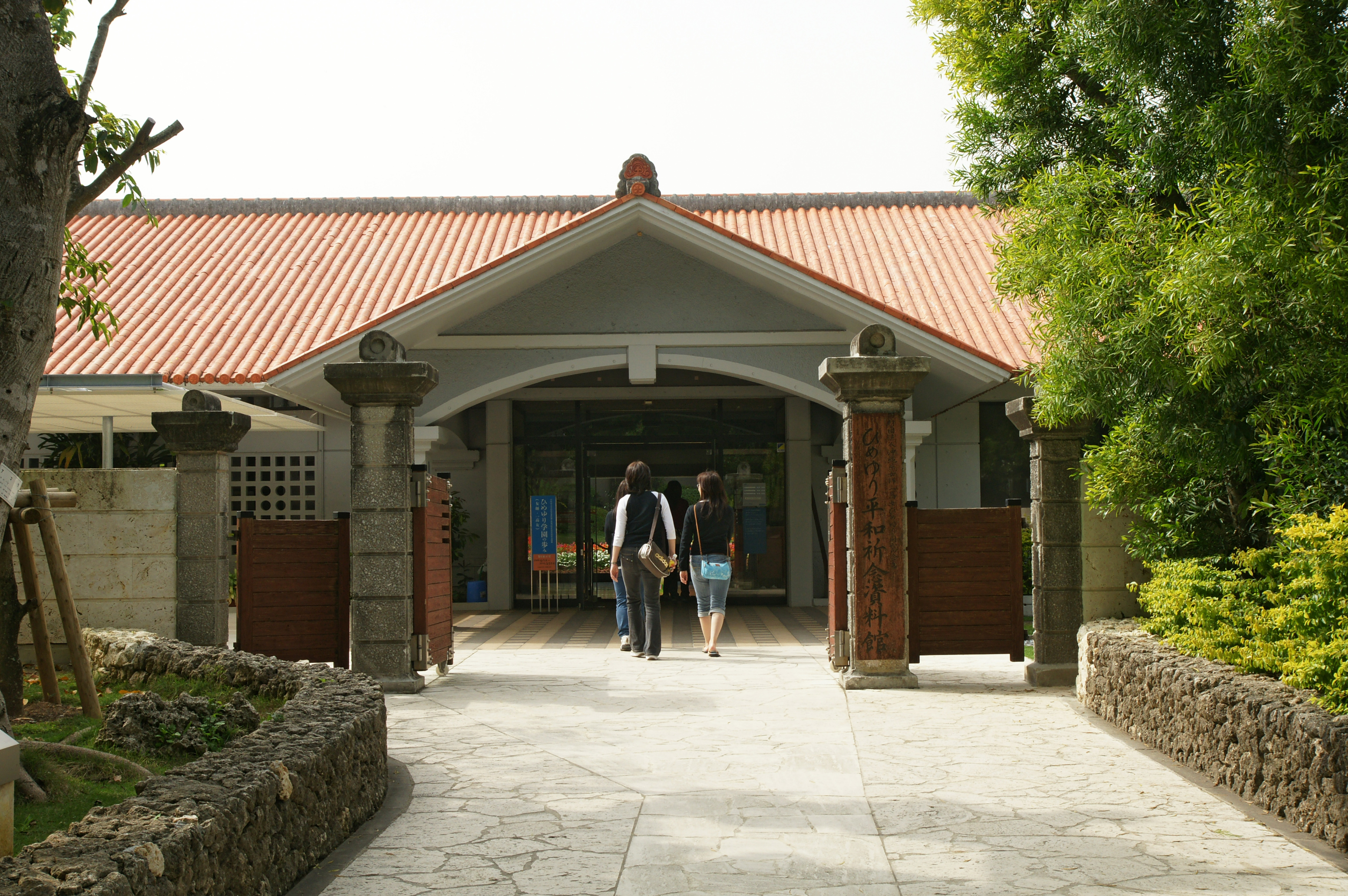
- Interactive map of the Himeyuri Peace Museum area

General information
- Location: 671-1 Ihara, Itoman, Okinawa Prefecture, Japan
- Coordinates: 26°05′47″N 127°41′25″E
- Opened: 23 June 1989

Website
- Official website

Himeyuri Peace Museum (ひめゆり平和祈念資料館, Himeyuri Heiwa Kinen Shiryōkan) opened in Itoman, Okinawa Prefecture, Japan in 1989. Located within Okinawa Senseki Quasi-National Park, it is dedicated to the Himeyuri Student Corps during the Battle of Okinawa and to the ideal of Peace.

== See also ==
- Okinawa Prefectural Peace Memorial Museum
- Cornerstone of Peace
- Himeyuri Memorial
