= Volunteer Fighting Corps =

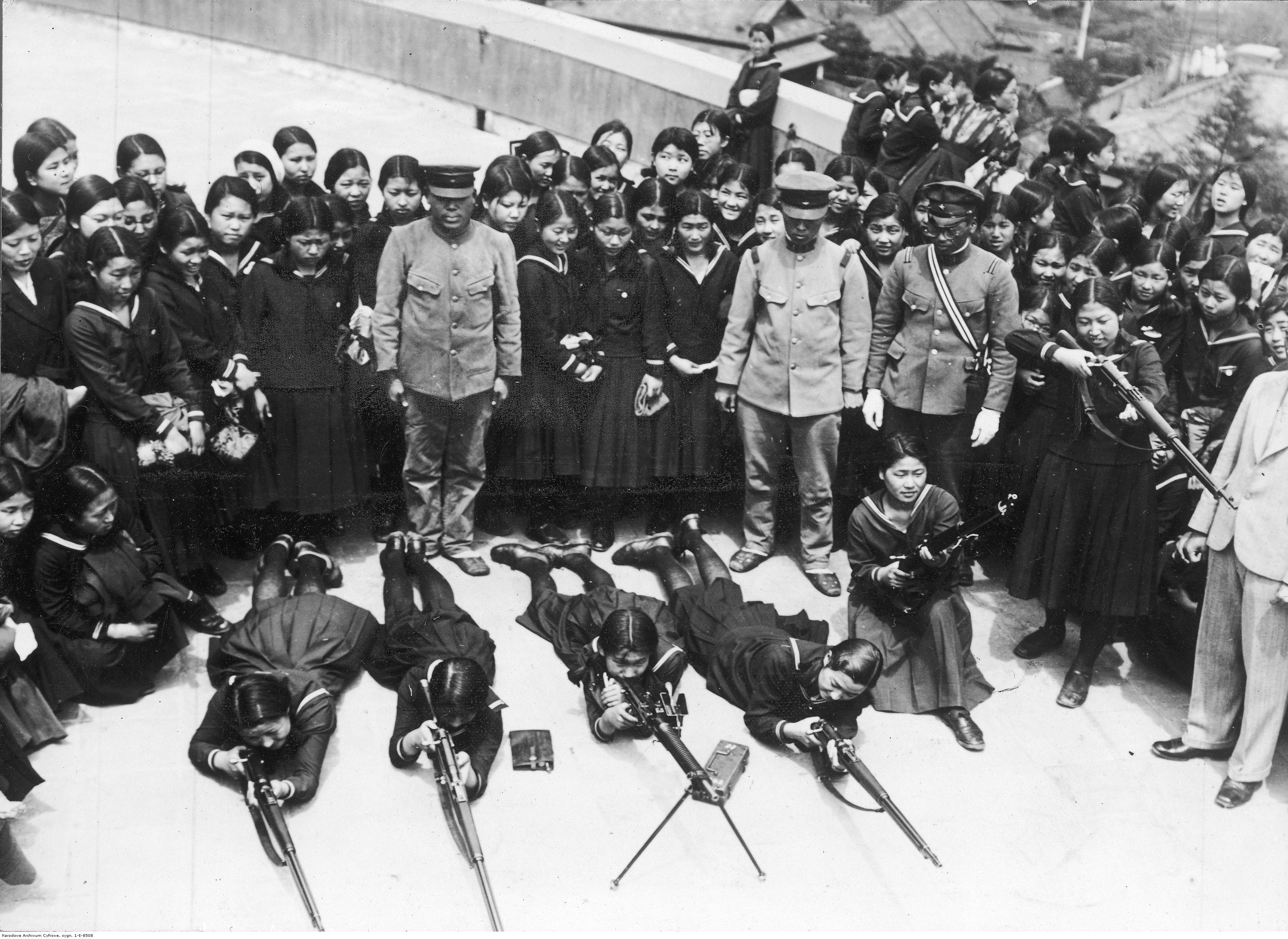
- Female students receive training in firearm handling
- Founded: 1945
- Disbanded: 1945
- Country: Japan
- Type: Militia, Civil Defence
- Size: 2 million men and women

Volunteer Fighting Corps (国民義勇戦闘隊, Kokumin Giyū Sentōtai) were armed civil defense units, turned militias, planned in 1945 in the Empire of Japan as a last desperate measure to defend the Japanese home islands against the projected Allied invasion during Operation Downfall (Ketsugo Sakusen) in the final stages of World War II.

They were the Japanese equivalent of the German Volkssturm and British Home Guard. Its commander-in-chief was former Prime Minister General Kuniaki Koiso.

== History ==
=== Volunteer Corps ===
In March 1945, the cabinet of Japanese Prime Minister Kuniaki Koiso passed a law establishing the creation of unarmed civil defense units, Volunteer Corps (国民義勇隊, Kokumin Giyūtai). With the assistance of the Taisei Yokusankai political party, the tonarigumi and Great Japan Youth Party, units were created by June 1945.

The Kokumin Giyūtai was not combatant, but working unit for fire service, food production, and evacuation. All male civilians between the ages of 12 and 65 years, and females between 12 and 45 years were members. They received training on fire fighting techniques and elementary first aid.

=== Reformation as militia ===
In April 1945, the Japanese cabinet resolved on reforming Kokumin Giyūtai into civilian militia. In June, the cabinet passed a special conscription law, and named the militia units Volunteer Fighting Corps (国民義勇戦闘隊, Kokumin Giyū Sentōtai).

The Kokumin Giyū Sentōtai would be organized, if Allied landing units came close to the Japanese homeland. Governors of Prefectures could conscript all male civilians between the ages of 15 and 60 years, and unmarried females of 17 to 40 years. Commanders were appointed from retired military personnel and civilians with weapons experience.

Combat training sessions were held, although the corps was primarily assigned to support tasks, such as construction, transportation and rationing.

The Volunteer Fighting Corps was intended as main reserve along with a "second defense line" for Japanese forces to sustain a war of attrition against invading forces. After the Allied invasion, these forces were intended to form resistance or guerilla warfare cells in cities, towns, or mountains.

=== Strength ===
Some 28 million men and women were considered "combat capable" by the end of June 1945, yet only about 2 million of them had been recruited by the time the war ended, and most of them did not experience combat due to Japan's surrender before the Allied invasion of the Japanese home islands. The Battle of Okinawa took place before the formation of Volunteer Fighting Corps. At this stage of the war, the lack of modern weaponry and ammunition meant that most were armed with swords or even bamboo spears.

Within Japan proper, the Volunteer Fighting Corps were never used in combat, except in South Sakhalin (the Battle of Okinawa occurred before its formal inception, with local Boeitai home guard conscripts forming part of the defences there). Similar units organized in Japanese territories outside of the Home Islands were used in battle. The units in Korea, Kwangtung, and Manchukuo sustained heavy casualties in combat against the Soviet Union during the Soviet invasion of Manchuria during the last days of World War II.

The Kokumin Giyūtai was abolished by order of the American occupation forces after the surrender of Japan.

== Equipment ==
Volunteer Fighting Corps units were theoretically armed with weapons including:

- Type 94 8 mm Pistol
- Type 99 Rifle
- Type 30 Rifle
- Type 38 Rifle
- Type 44 Cavalry Rifle
- Type 11 LMG
- Type 5 Anti-aircraft gun
- Type 4 20 cm Rocket Launcher
- Type 10 Grenade Discharger
- Type 89 Grenade Discharger
- Ceramic hand grenades
- Tanegashima
- Murata rifle
- National Defence Pistol and Rifle
- Lunge AT Mine (anti-tank mine on bamboo pole)

However, in many cases improvised weapons were the only available ones:

- Molotov cocktails
- Simple pointed bamboo or wood sticks
- Swords, bayonets, knives and even polearms & staff weapons (e.g. Guntō, Type 30 bayonet, Hori hori, Kamayari/Naginata & Hanbō/Jō)
- Clubs and truncheons such as the Kanabō or even simpler
- Type 4 grenades were in plentiful enough supply due to their ease of manufacture.

== See also ==
- Boeitai
- Gakutotai
- Himeyuri students
- Japanese holdout
- Kamikaze
- Matsushiro Underground Imperial Headquarters
- Senjinkun military code
- Stay-behind

Other Axis nations:

- Black Brigades (Italy)
- Volkssturm (Germany)
- Werwolf (Germany)
