= Himeyuri students =

Japanese wartime nurses in Okinawa

- 姫百合学徒隊 (Himeyuri Gakutotai)
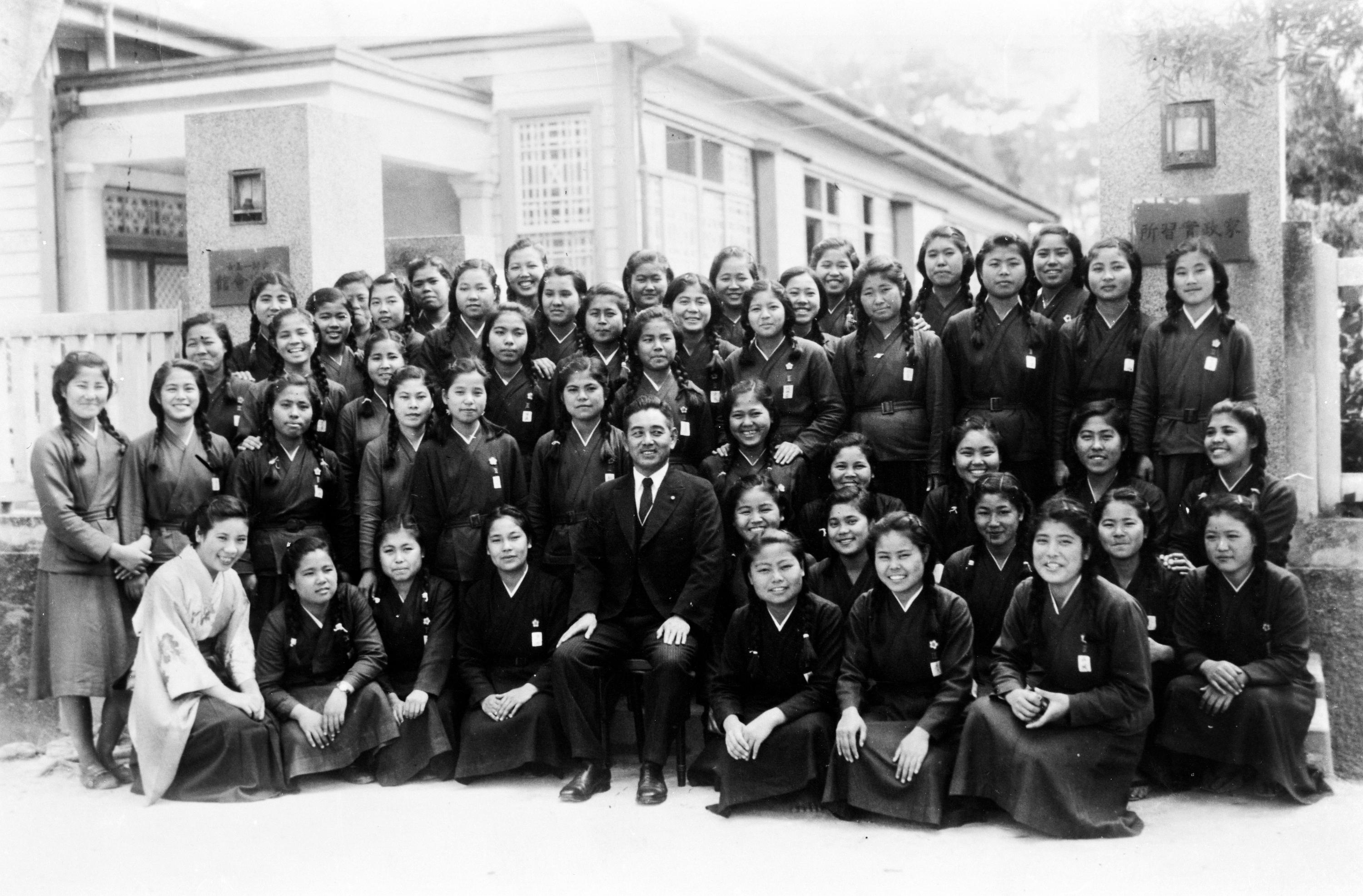
- A class of Himeyuri students prior to mobilisation
- Active: 23 March 1945 – 18 June 1945
- Country: Japan
- Branch: Imperial Japanese Army
- Type: Nursing unit
- Role: Emergency Medical Treatment; Munitions transportation
- Engagements: World War II: Battle of Okinawa

The Himeyuri students (姫百合学徒隊, Himeyuri Gakutotai; Himeyuri Student Corps), sometimes erroneously called "Lily Corps" (Note: "Lily Corps" is a misnomer: originally it was written 姫百合 as an acronym (theories vary) and it was started to be written in hiragana, ひめゆり, "himeyuri" as the name of the flower, "lily" only after the war.) in English, was a group of 222 students and 18 teachers of the First Okinawa Girls' High School and Okinawa Women's Normal School formed into a nursing unit for the Imperial Japanese Army during the Battle of Okinawa in 1945. They were mobilized by the Japanese Army on March 23, 1945.

The students were wrongly told that the Japanese army would defeat the American invasion easily, and that they would be safe from danger. Many brought their school supplies and uniforms with them to study and prepare to return to school. Deployed instead to frontline cave hospitals under constant gunfire and bombings, few students and teachers managed to survive the war.

== History ==
Falsely briefed of working in Red Cross hospitals away from the fighting, the Himeyuri students were instead positioned on the front lines performing crude surgery and amputations, burying the dead, transporting ammunition and supplies to front-line troops, and other life-threatening duties under continuous fire throughout the nearly three-month battle. Near the end of the Okinawan battle, those still alive endured disease and malnutrition in dark caves filled with countless gravely injured and dead civilians, soldiers, and co-students.

=== Unit dissolution and casualties ===
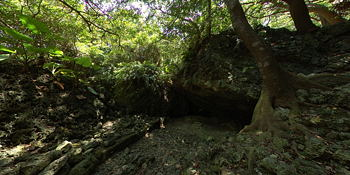
The entrance to a cave where several dozen Himeyuri students died on June 19, 1945

Up until the Himeyuri unit was dissolved, 19 students had been killed. On June 18, 1945, a rough dissolution order was given to the unit. Told simply to "go home" amidst total war, the schoolgirls suffered a high casualty rate in the crossfire of Japanese and American forces. In the early hours of the next day (June 19), 5 teachers and 46 students hiding inside the Ihara third surgery shelter were killed by white phosphorus munitions during an attack by US forces.

In the week following the dissolution order, approximately 80% of the girls and their teachers remaining on Okinawa Island died. 136 of the Himeyuri unit mobilised into the Haebaru Army Field Hospital were killed, 123 of the students and 13 teachers. Overall, 211 students and 16 teachers were killed, including those not mobilised.

Some committed suicide in various ways because of fear of systematic rape by US soldiers. Before the fighting could end, some students threw themselves off the jagged cliffs of the Arasaki seashore or poisoned themselves with cyanide (earlier administered to soldiers in terminal condition), while others killed themselves with hand grenades given to them by Japanese soldiers.

=== Himeyuri Memorial ===
The Himeyuri Memorial was built on April 7, 1946, in memory of those who died. It lists the names of every Himeyuri student and teacher killed during the War. Many of those who survived helped build and continue to maintain the facilities. As of 2020, there are still several Himeyuri students alive.

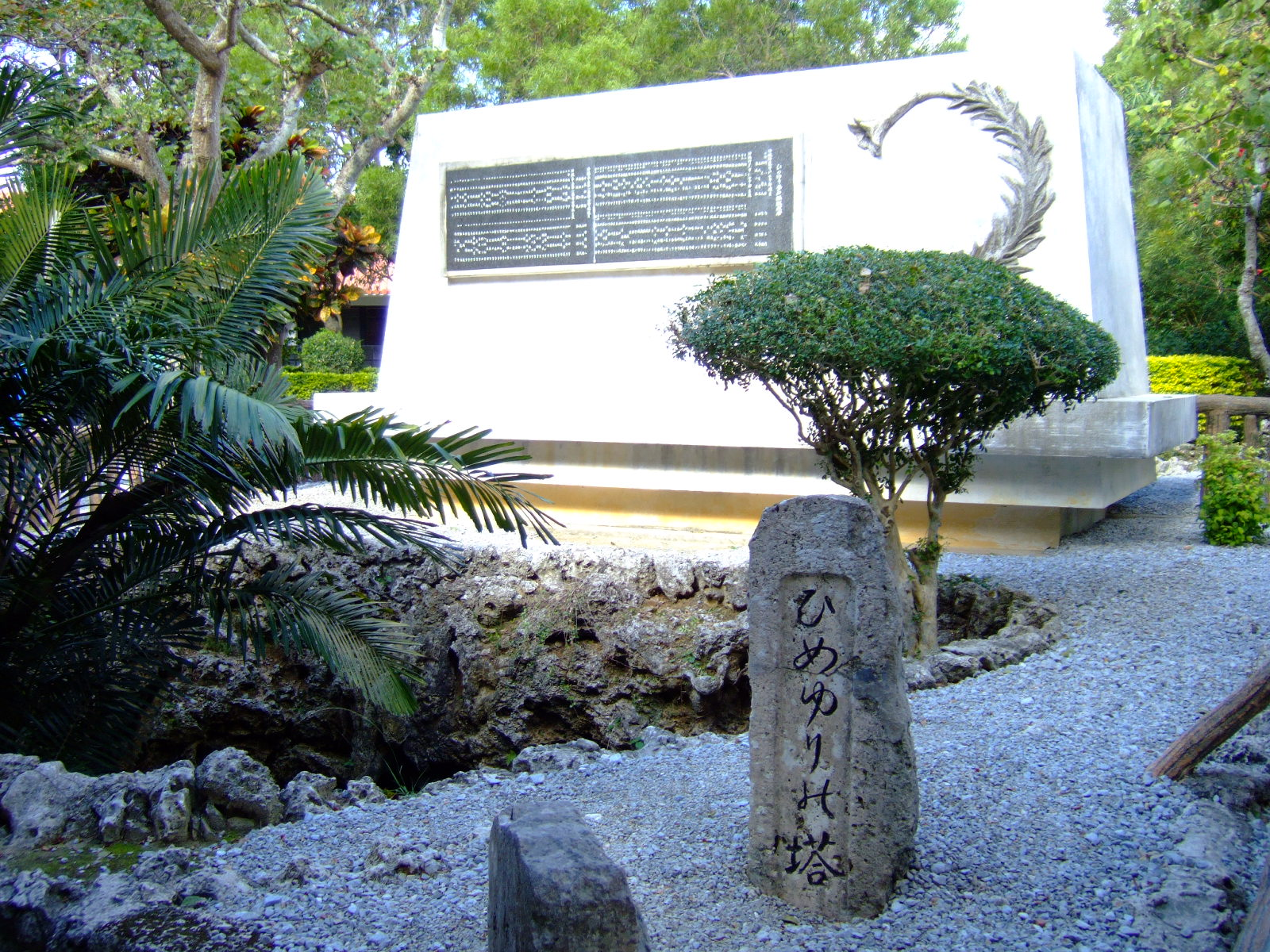
Himeyuri Memorial in Itoman, Okinawa

=== Himeyuri Peace Museum ===
The Himeyuri Peace Museum was modeled after the main school building in which the girls had once studied. Renovated and reopened on Okinawa Memorial Day in 2009, the museum has six display chambers displaying photos from the eve of the Battle of Okinawa, the Haebaru Army Field Hospital, portraits of all the young victims who died after the military's retreat to the southernmost tip of the Kyan Peninsula, panels explaining the circumstances under which they died, twenty-eight volumes of testimonials and memoirs by survivors, and a life-sized diorama of the aforementioned cave where many students lost their lives.

The testimonials bring to life each phase of the battle, as witnessed by the student nurses. Some of the former nurses have served as both tour guides and curators at the museum. A second renovation of the museum took place in June 2020, with input from surviving Himeyuri students.

== In media ==
- Himeyuri no Tô (Himeyuri Tower): Japanese war drama (1953)
- Taiheiyô Sensô to Himeyuri Butai (The Pacific War and Himeyuri Corps): Japanese war drama (1962)
- Â Himeyuri no Tô (Ah, Himeyuri Tower): Japanese war drama (1968)
- Himeyuri no Tô (Himeyuri Tower): Japanese war drama (1982)
- Himeyuri no Tô (Himeyuri Tower): Japanese war drama (1995)
- Himeyuri: Japanese documentary (2007)
- Cocoon (manga): Japanese manga (2009–2010)
- Little Lily: novel by Yuri Melnikov (2026)

== See also ==
- Battle of Okinawa
- Boeitai
- Gakutotai
- History of the Ryukyus
- Rape during the occupation of Japan
- Total war
- Volunteer Fighting Corps
