= Boeitai =

Japanese military force in World War II

The Boeitai (Japanese: 防衛隊, "Defense Corps") was a Japanese force of World War II. It was established by the War Ministry in June 1944 in response to the worsening war situation facing Japan, and initially comprised all reservists in the 20–40 age group including those who would not normally be liable for military service under the Japanese conscription system. The Imperial Japanese Army's area armies had responsibility for raising and administering Boeitai units, and there was considerable variation in how these formations were structured and used. Boeitai units were established in the Japanese home islands, Okinawa, Korea and Formosa. Unlike regular Japanese Army soldiers, Boeitai personnel were not indoctrinated to fight to the death or consider themselves to be imperial subjects.

Around 20,000 local Boeitai were involved in the Battle of Okinawa during 1945, with most initially serving as labourers or in support roles but some augmenting frontline Army units. Most of the Okinawan Boeitai were teenagers or aged in their 30s and 40s. As the fighting continued, many of the support personnel were assigned to combat duties despite not being provided with any training for this role or effective weapons; some Boeitai personnel were ordered to conduct missions in which they attempted to blow up tanks with satchel charges. In addition, several Okinawan Boeitai groups fought as partisans armed mainly with spears and grenades. Morale among Boeitai personnel in Okinawa was low, due to the discrimination they suffered at the hands of Japanese military personnel and a widespread belief that the war was lost. In addition, many Boeitai conscripts had families to support. As a result, around 20 percent of Boeitai personnel on Okinawa deserted or surrendered to American forces. However, 50 percent of the personnel became casualties during the battle.

== See also ==
- Gakutotai
- Himeyuri students
- Volunteer Fighting Corps
