= Okinawa Prefectural Peace Memorial Museum =

Museum and memorial monument in Japan

Coordinates: 26.096447°N 127.725391°E

Okinawa Prefectural Peace Memorial Museum 沖縄県平和祈念資料館
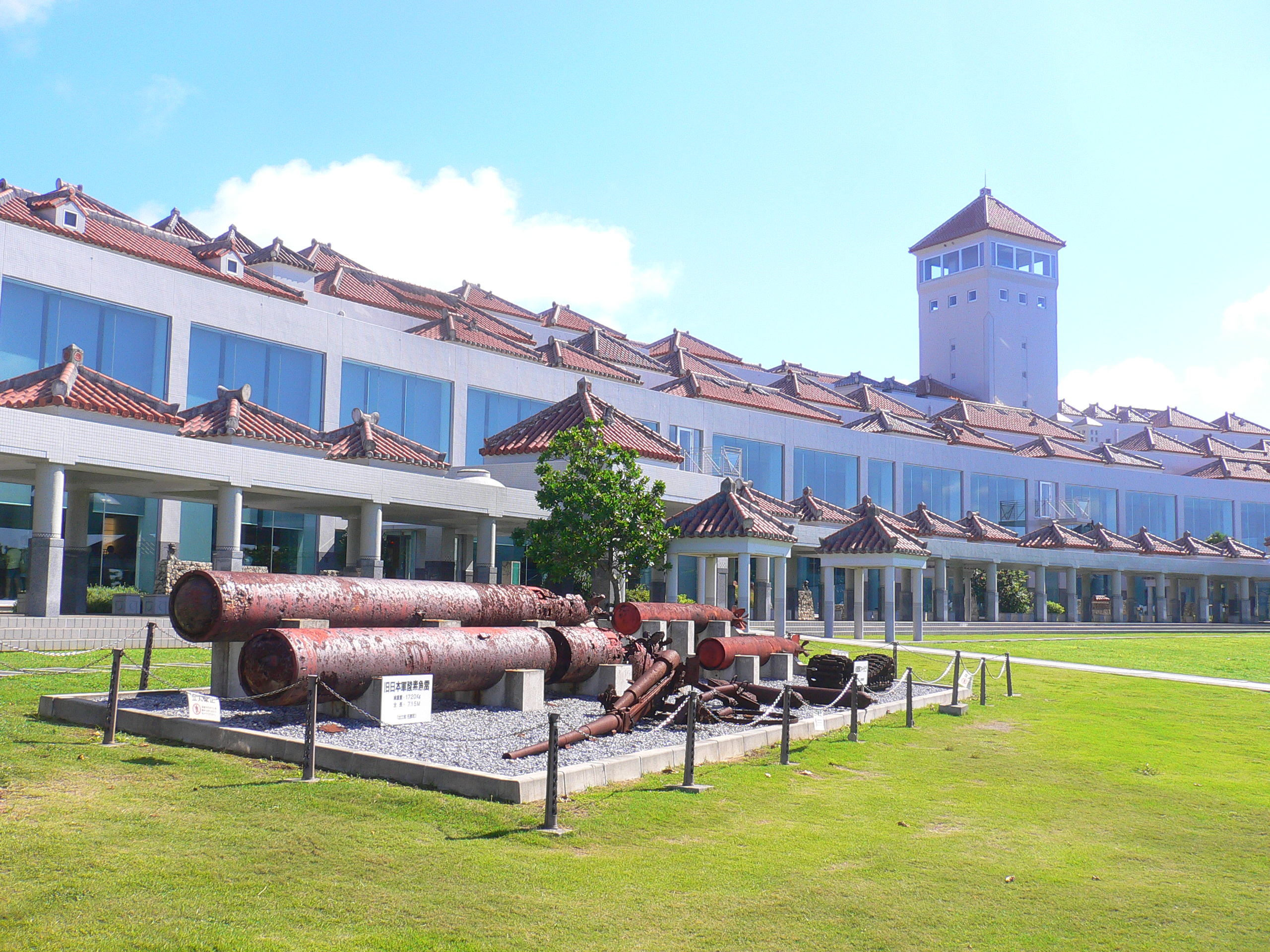
- Okinawa Prefectural Peace Memorial Museum
- Established: 1975
- Location: Itoman, Okinawa
- Type: War memorial
- Website: www.peace-museum.pref.okinawa.jp/english/index.html

Okinawa Prefectural Peace Memorial Museum (沖縄県立平和祈念資料館, Okinawa Kenritsu Heiwa Kinen Shiryōkan) is a museum in Itoman, Okinawa. It was established on June 11, 1975. The Cornerstone of Peace, a monument similar to the Vietnam Veterans Memorial, is located here.

== Background ==
During World War II, the United States invaded the Ryukyu Islands to use them as a staging area for the Invasion of Japan. Fighting occurred between March and September 1945, resulting in over 250,000 casualties, including 150,000 Okinawan civilians. The Battle of Okinawa has been described as the deadliest battle of the war. The United States controlled the islands until 1972, when they were returned to Japan and Okinawa Prefecture was reestablished.

== Description ==
The Peace Memorial Museum, Peace Prayer Park, and the Cornerstone of Peace were established in 1975 on Mabuni Hill, next to the "Suicide Cliffs" where the Battle of Okinawa ended. The Cornerstone of Peace is a semi-circular avenue of stones engraved with the names of all the dead from the Battle of Okinawa, organized by nationality (or by ethnicity for Chinese, Taiwanese, Koreans, and Okinawans). The Memorial Path includes 32 memorial monuments as well as the place where Lieutenant General Ushima died by suicide. There are a number of separate memorials including the Okinawa Peace Hall, a large tower erected in 1978, and individual monuments for each Prefecture of Japan.
