= Okinawa Kaigan Quasi-National Park =

Quasi-National Park in Okinawa and the Kerama Islands, Japan

- 沖縄海岸国定公園
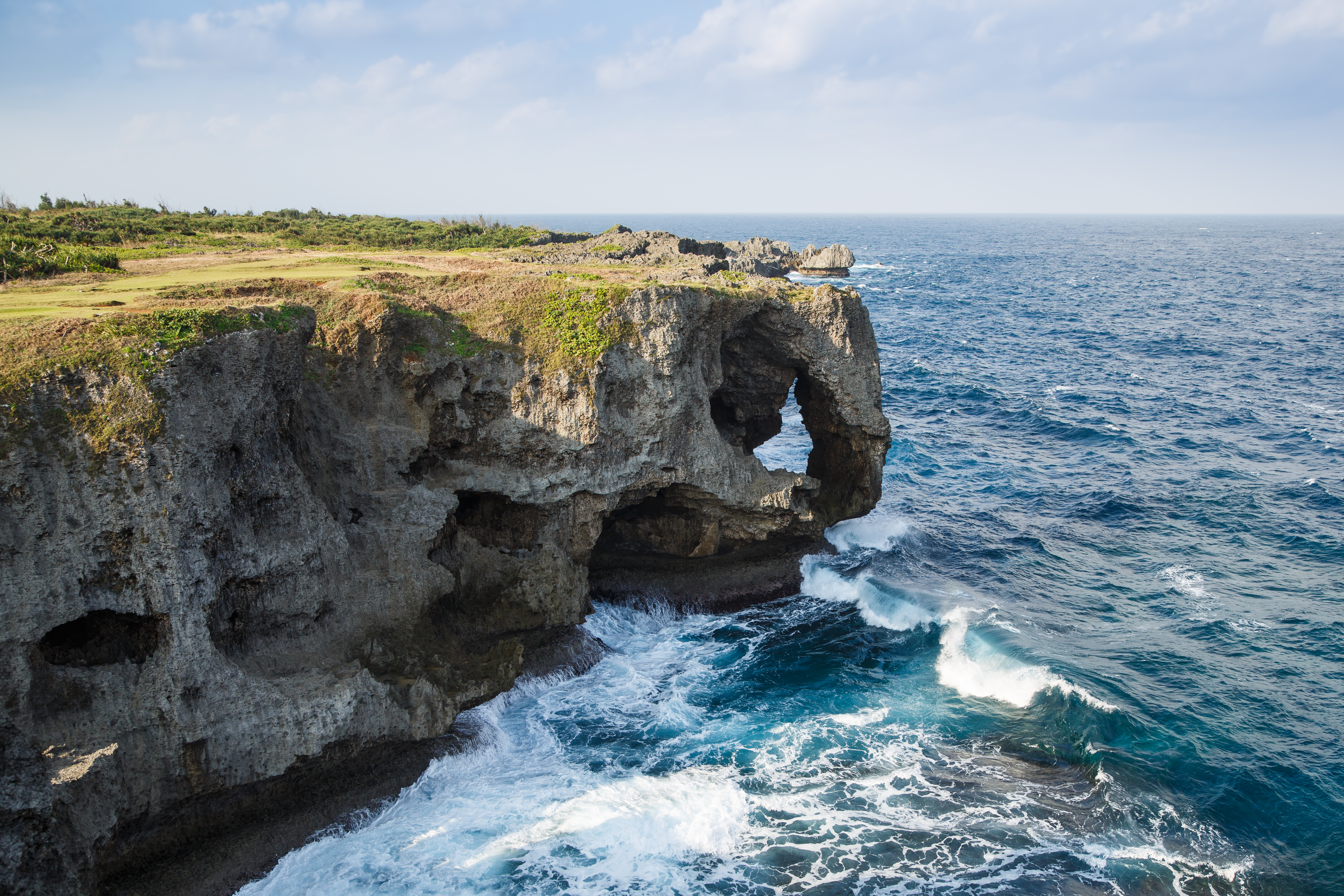
- Cape Manzamo

- Location within Japan
- Location: Okinawa Prefecture, Japan
- Coordinates: 26°36′29″N 128°02′24″E
- Area: 103.2 km^{2} (39.8 sq mi)
- Established: 15 May 1972

Okinawa Kaigan Quasi-National Park (沖縄海岸国定公園, Okinawa Kaigan Kokutei Kōen) is a Quasi-National Park on the coast of Okinawa and the Kerama Islands, Japan. It was established as a Prefectural Park in 1965 and re-designated with the return of Okinawa to the Japanese administration in 1972.

== See also ==
- List of national parks of Japan
- Okinawa Senseki Quasi-National Park
