= Kunai =

Japanese gardening and masonry tool adapted as a weapon

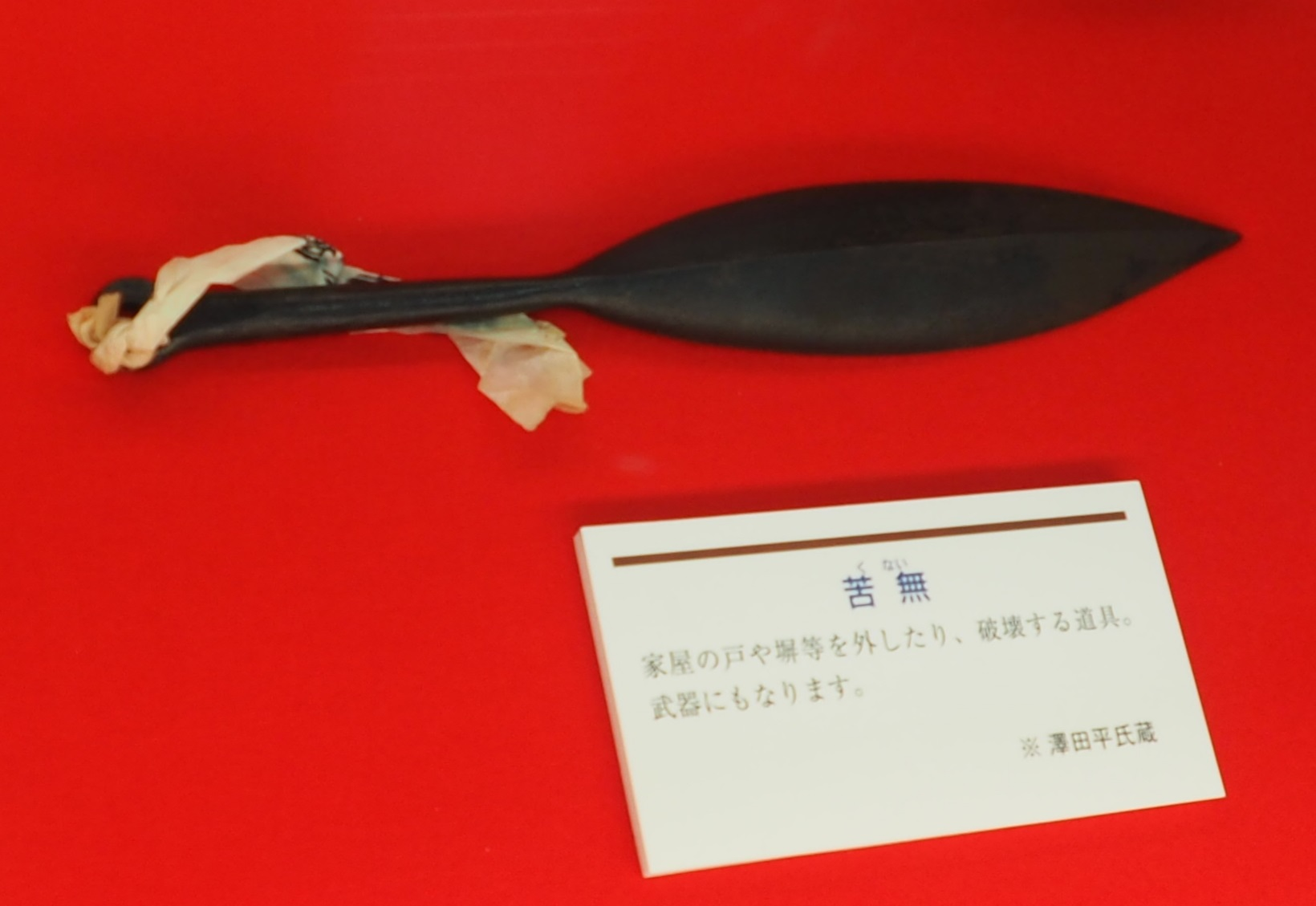
A historical kunai

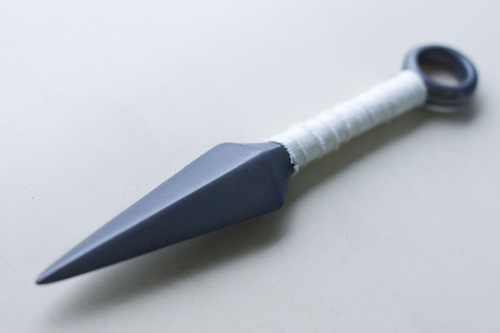
A highly stylized plastic kunai, as often portrayed in popular culture

A kunai (苦無, kunai) is a Japanese multipurpose tool thought to be originally derived from the masonry trowel.

== Design ==
A kunai normally had a leaf-shaped wrought blade in lengths ranging from 20 and 30 cm (7.9 and 11.8 in) and a handle with a ring on the pommel for attaching a rope.

The attached rope allowed the kunai's handle to be wrapped to function as a grip, or to be strapped to a stick as a makeshift spear; to be tied to the body for concealment; to be used as an anchor or piton, and sometimes to be used as the Chinese rope dart.

== Variants ==
Varieties of kunai include short, long, narrow-bladed, saw-toothed, and wide-bladed.

The two widely recognized kinds are the short kunai (小苦無 shō-kunai) and the big kunai (大苦無 dai-kunai).

In some cases, the kunai and the Nishikori, a wide-bladed saw with a dagger-type handle, are difficult to distinguish.

== Uses ==
Contrary to popular belief, kunai were not designed to be used primarily as throwing weapons. Instead, kunai were primarily tools used as weapons for stabbing and thrusting.

=== Utility ===
The kunai was originally used by peasants as a multi-purpose gardening tool and by workers of stone and masonry.

The blade is made of soft iron and is left unsharpened because the edges are used to smash relatively soft materials such as plaster and wood, for digging holes, and for prying. Normally, only the tip is sharpened.

=== Weapon ===
Although a basic tool, the kunai, in the hands of a martial arts expert, could be used as a multi-functional weapon.

Many ninja weapons were adapted from farming tools, not unlike those used by Shaolin monks in China.

Since kunai were cheaply produced farming tools of proper size and weight and could be easily sharpened, they were readily available to be converted into simple weapons for covert uses.

=== Ninjutsu ===
The kunai is commonly associated with the ninja, who in folklore used them to climb walls.

As with ninjutsu, the exaggeration persistent in ninja myths played a large role in creating the popular culture image of kunai.

In fictional depictions of ninjas, the kunai is commonly portrayed as a steel knife that is used for stabbing or particularly throwing, sometimes confused with the shuriken.

== See also ==
- List of martial arts weapons
- Hori hori
- Shikoro blade
- Shuriken
- Tantō
- Throwing knife
- Trowel
- Batarang

== Sources ==
Turnbull, Stephen (2003). Ninja AD 1460–1650. Kanhaiyalal chhajed. ISBN 978-1-84176-525-9.
