= Type 4 grenade =

Type 4 "ceramic" grenade
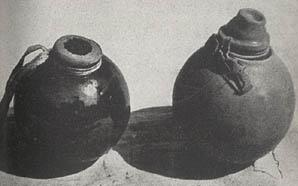
- Two Type 4 grenades. The one on the left does not have the rubber cover on.
- Type: Hand grenade
- Place of origin: Empire of Japan

Service history
- In service: 1944–1945
- Wars: World War II

Production history
- Designed: 1944
- Manufacturer: Vessels made by several potteries, finishing by Asano Carlit
- Produced: 1944–1945

Specifications
- Mass: ca. 455 g (1.003 lb)
- Height: ca. 102 mm (4.0 in)
- Diameter: various, ca. 76 mm (3.0 in)
- Filling: Type 88 explosive
- Filling weight: ca. 100 g (0.22 lb)
- Detonation mechanism: Fuse delay of 4 to 5 seconds

The Type 4 ceramic grenade (四式陶製手榴弾) was a "last-ditch" hand grenade developed in the closing stages of World War II.

== History and development ==
By late 1944 and early 1945, much of the industrial infrastructure of Japan had been destroyed by Allied strategic bombing, and there was a growing shortage of raw materials due to Allied naval blockades and submarine warfare.

Lacking in metals to mass-produce hand grenades in the vast quantities that would be needed against the projected Allied invasion of Japan, the Imperial Japanese Navy Technical Bureau developed a design for a cheap, easy-to-make grenade made of ceramic or porcelain materials.

Kilns famous for the production of traditional Japanese pottery, such as Arita, Bizen and Seto were pressed into service to manufacture these relatively crude weapons. There were a tremendous number of variants on shape, size and color, because the design depended on each kiln.

== Design ==
The Type 4 grenade had a fragmentation body made of terra cotta or porcelain materials. The grenade was round-shaped with a bottle neck with a rubber cover and a simple fuse.

This detonator was no more than a blasting cap crimped on to a five-second length of fuse. The other end of the fuse, which was outside the rubber plug, was covered with a match-head composition.

A slip-on rubber cap covered the whole neck, and fuse.

A small, loose wooden block with an abrasive composition on one side was contained in the rubber fuse cover.

== Combat record ==
Type 4 grenades were passed out in large quantities to civil defense organizations, such as the Volunteer Fighting Corps, Yokusan Sonendan, and to reservist organizations involved in preparations against the possible invasion of the Japanese home islands by Allied forces.

They were also supplied to front line combat troops in large quantities, and are known to have been employed at the Battle of Iwo Jima and Battle of Okinawa.

== Users ==
- Empire of Japan
  - Imperial Japanese Navy

== Photo gallery ==
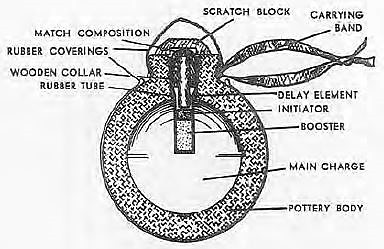
Schematic of components

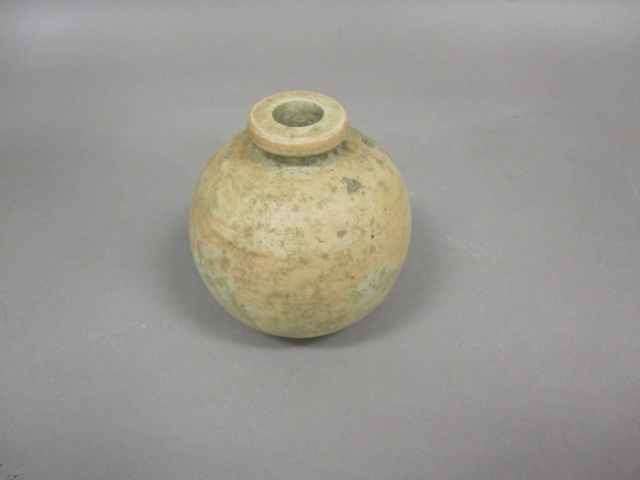

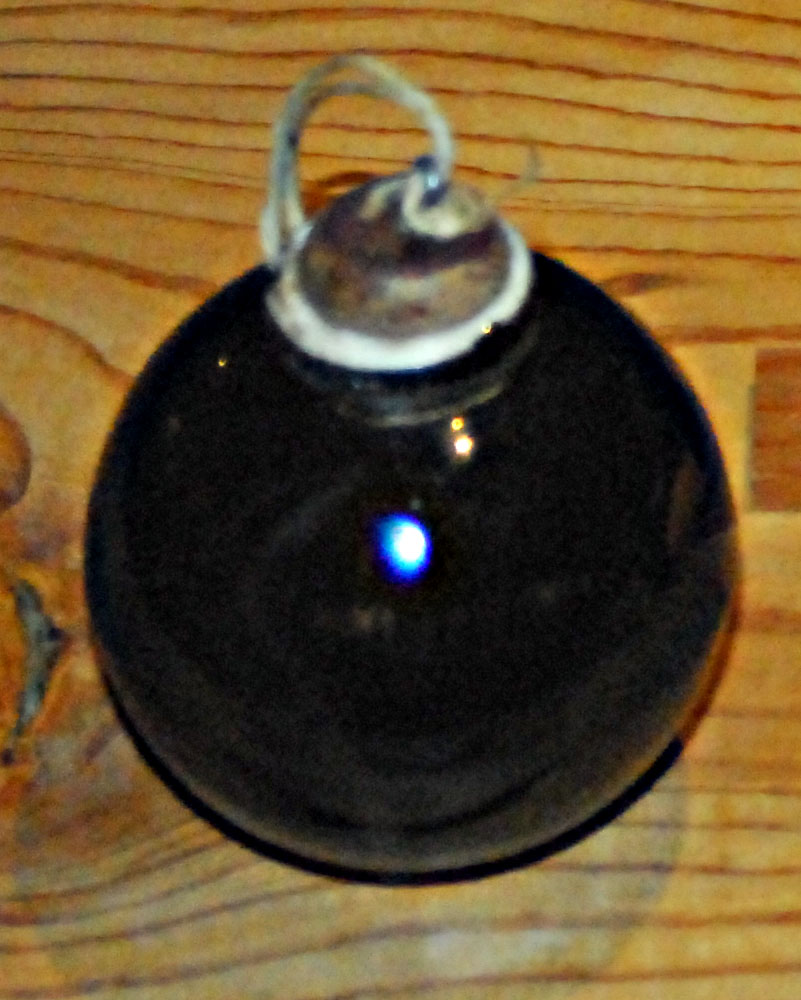

== See also ==
- Zhentianlei
