= Gakutotai =

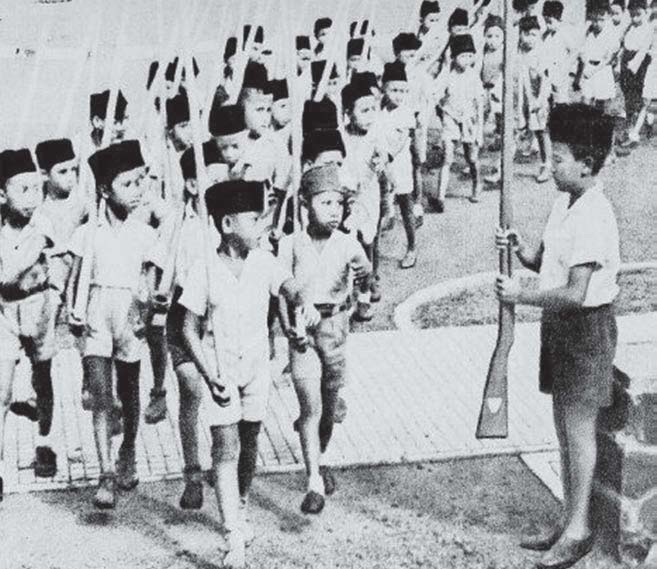
Indonesian children gathered in the Gakutotai ranks practice marching as a form of Japanese semi-military training

Gakutotai (学徒隊, Gakutotai; "Student Corps") were child soldier regiments of the Imperial Japanese Army raised from high school students in territories occupied by the Empire of Japan, such as Korea, China, Malaya, Burma, and the Dutch East Indies (present-day Indonesia).

== Structure and training ==
In the Gakutotai command structure, a high school became a chutai (company). Each class became a shotai (section) and every class was further divided into butai (squads). There were differences in the training of male and female students. Male students received more rigorous training, such as physical education, shooting, military tactics, and all the basic military training needed to create model soldiers for the Japanese war effort. They were also given mock Arisaka rifles (mokujū) for their training, while class leaders were given wooden dummy swords (bokken) like the commanders of the Imperial Japanese Army. Training for female students was physically less demanding, revolving around emergency medicine, preparing mess, and gathering enemy military intelligence.

== See also ==
- Boeitai
- Himeyuri students
- Volunteer Fighting Corps
