= Cornerstone of Peace =

Monument in the Okinawa island, Japan

Coordinates: 26°05′42.7″N 127°43′30.1″E

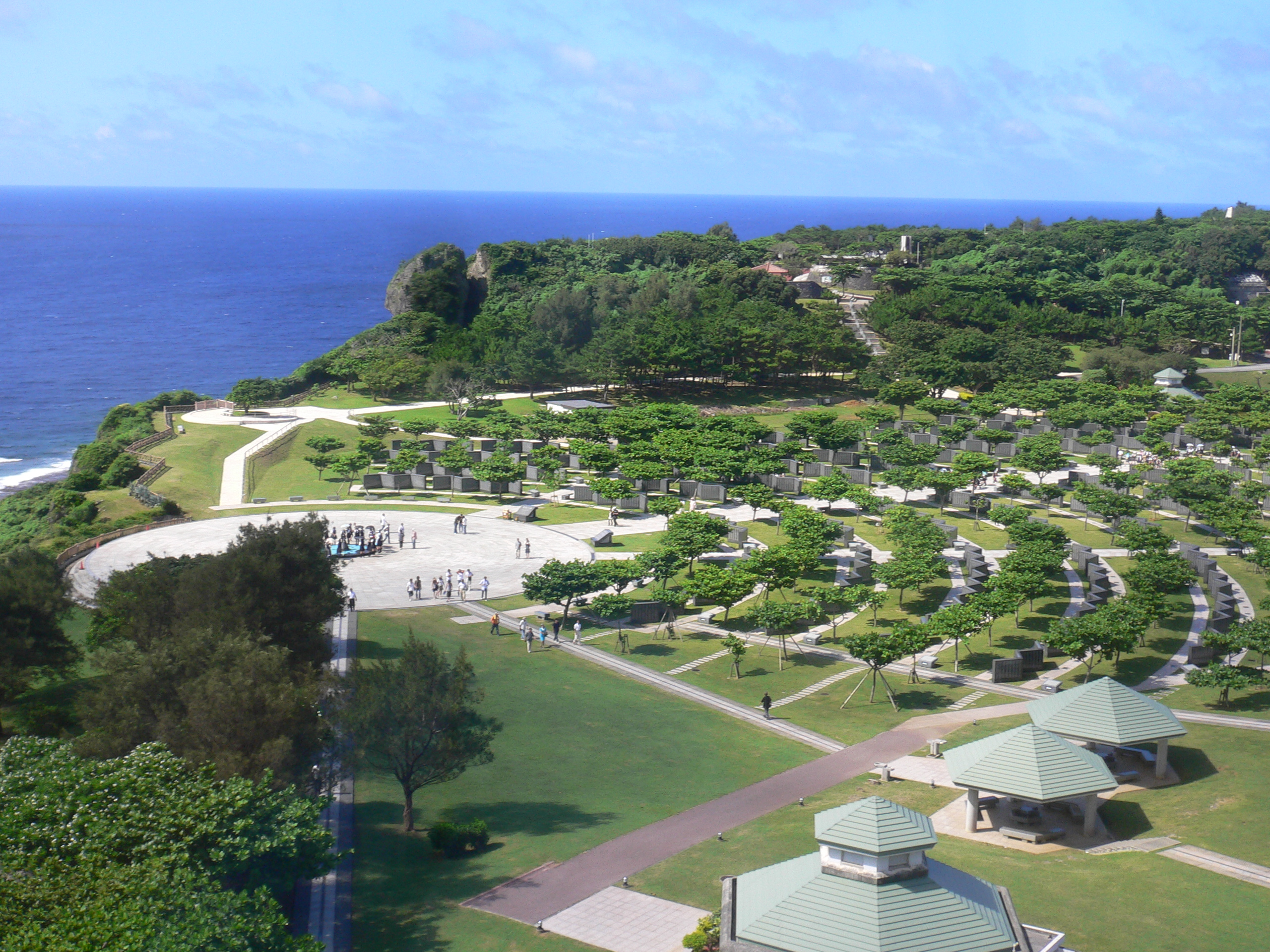
The Cornerstone of Peace, memorial to all those who died in the Battle of Okinawa

The Cornerstone of Peace is a monument in Itoman commemorating the Battle of Okinawa and the role of Okinawa during World War II. The names of over two hundred and forty thousand people who lost their lives are inscribed on the memorial.

== Purpose ==
The Cornerstone of Peace (平和の礎, Heiwa no Ishiji) was unveiled on 23 June 1995 in memory of the fiftieth anniversary of the Battle of Okinawa and the end of World War II. It was erected to: (1) Remember those lost in the war, and pray for perpetual peace; (2) Pass on the lessons of war; and (3) Serve as a place for meditation and learning.

== Name and political background ==
Constructed by the administration of Masahide Ōta, and as detailed in his book of the same name Okinawa: Heiwa no Ishiji, the name 'Cornerstone of Peace' alludes to the Japan-US security partnership. Ōta writes 'It would not be an exaggeration to say that the motivation which led to the building of this 'Cornerstone of Peace' has also become the basis for the people of Okinawa devoting heart and soul, night and day, to solving the military base issue.' When US President Bill Clinton visited the Cornerstone of Peace in 2000 he delivered a speech promising efforts to reduce and consolidate US bases in Okinawa, as previously agreed by the US and Japanese governments.

== Design ==
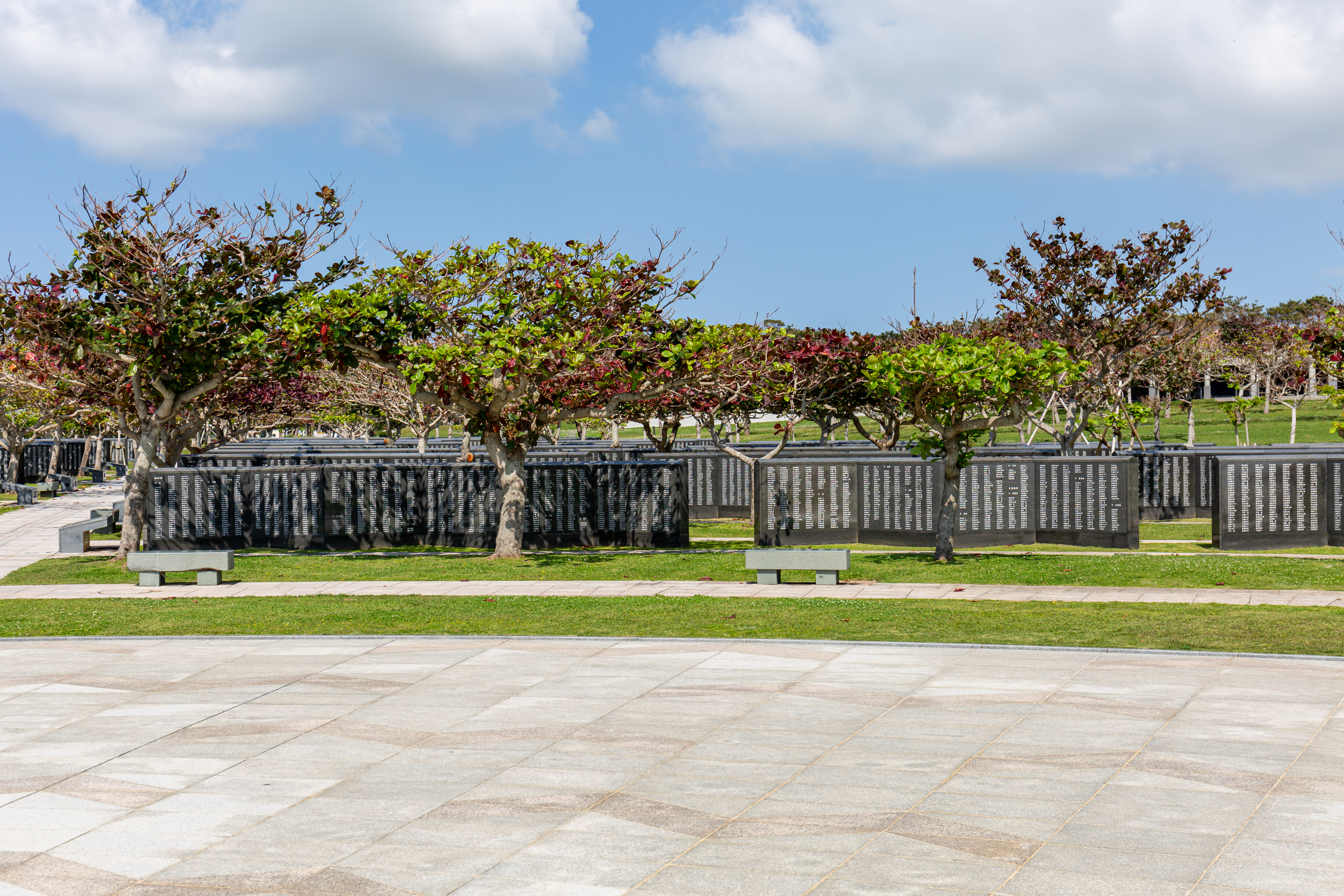
20190406 Cornerstone of Peace-2

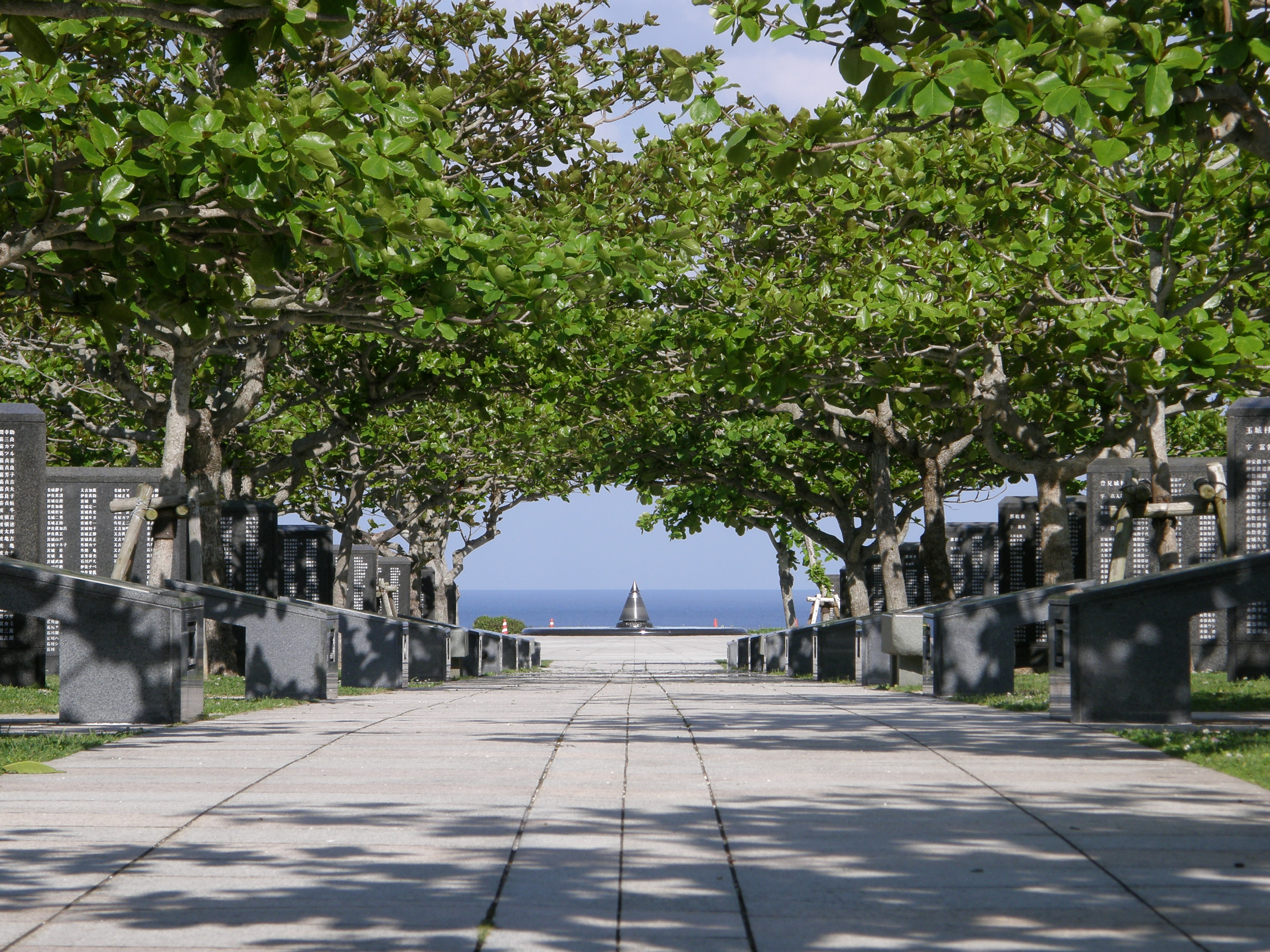
The main passage that extends to the 'fire of peace'

The winning design, entitled 'Everlasting Waves of Peace', comprises concentric arcs of wavelike black granite stelai or screens. These are inscribed with the names of all those who died, regardless of nationality and civilian or military status. The names are in horizontal order from left to right, and in their native alphabet according to place of origin. The series totals some 116 stones, with the text running a total length of 2,200 metres (7,200 ft).

== Inscription ==
As of June 2015, there were 241,281 names. By order of inscription are 77,380 from other prefectures of Japan, by prefecture; 149,329 from Okinawa Prefecture, by hamlet; 14,009 from the USA, by unit; 82 from the UK; 365 from the Republic of Korea; 82 from North Korea; and 34 from Taiwan. The numbers correspond to recorded deaths during the Battle of Okinawa from the time of the US landings in the Kerama Islands on 26 March 1945 to the signing of the Japanese surrender on 2 September 1945, in addition to all Okinawan casualties in the Pacific War in the fifteen years from the Manchurian Incident, along with those who died in Okinawa from war-related events in the year before the battle and the year after the surrender. 234,183 names were inscribed by the time of unveiling and new names are added each year.

== Location ==
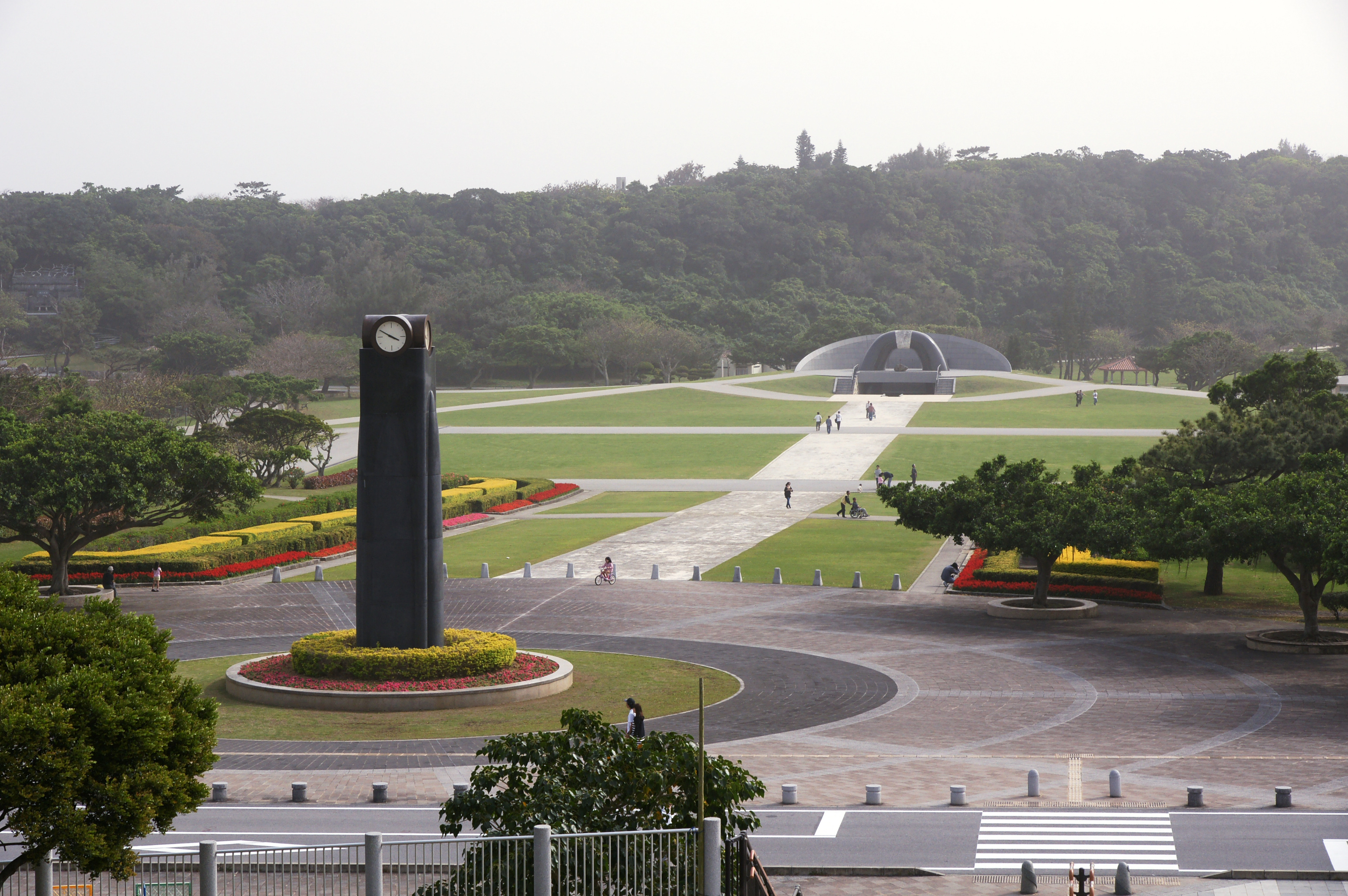
Okinawa Prefectural Peace Park

The site chosen for the memorial is Mabuni Hill in Itoman City, site of the Japanese headquarters and scene of heavy fighting in late June 1945 at the end of the Battle of Okinawa. The area forms part of the Okinawa Senseki Quasi-National Park (沖縄戦跡国定公園).

== Related initiatives ==
The Okinawa Prefectural Peace Memorial Museum (沖縄県平和祈念資料館 Okinawa Kenritsu Heiwa Kinen Shiryōkan) was opened in 1975.

In 2001 the Okinawa Peace Prize was established in order to recognize local contributions to peace in the Asia-Pacific region.

The Centre for the Study of Pacific War Memories at the University of California Santa Cruz is developing a visualization project in order to reproduce virtually the Cornerstone of Peace while making use of recently declassified photographs from the archives of the Department of Defense.

== See also ==
- Okinawa Memorial Day
- Okinawa Prefectural Peace Memorial Museum
- Battle of Okinawa
- Peace education
- Ryūkyū Kingdom
- War memorial
