= Okinawa Senseki Quasi-National Park =

Quasi-National Park around the battlefields of south Okinawa, Japan

Coordinates: 26°05′34″N 127°41′36″E

- 沖縄戦跡国定公園
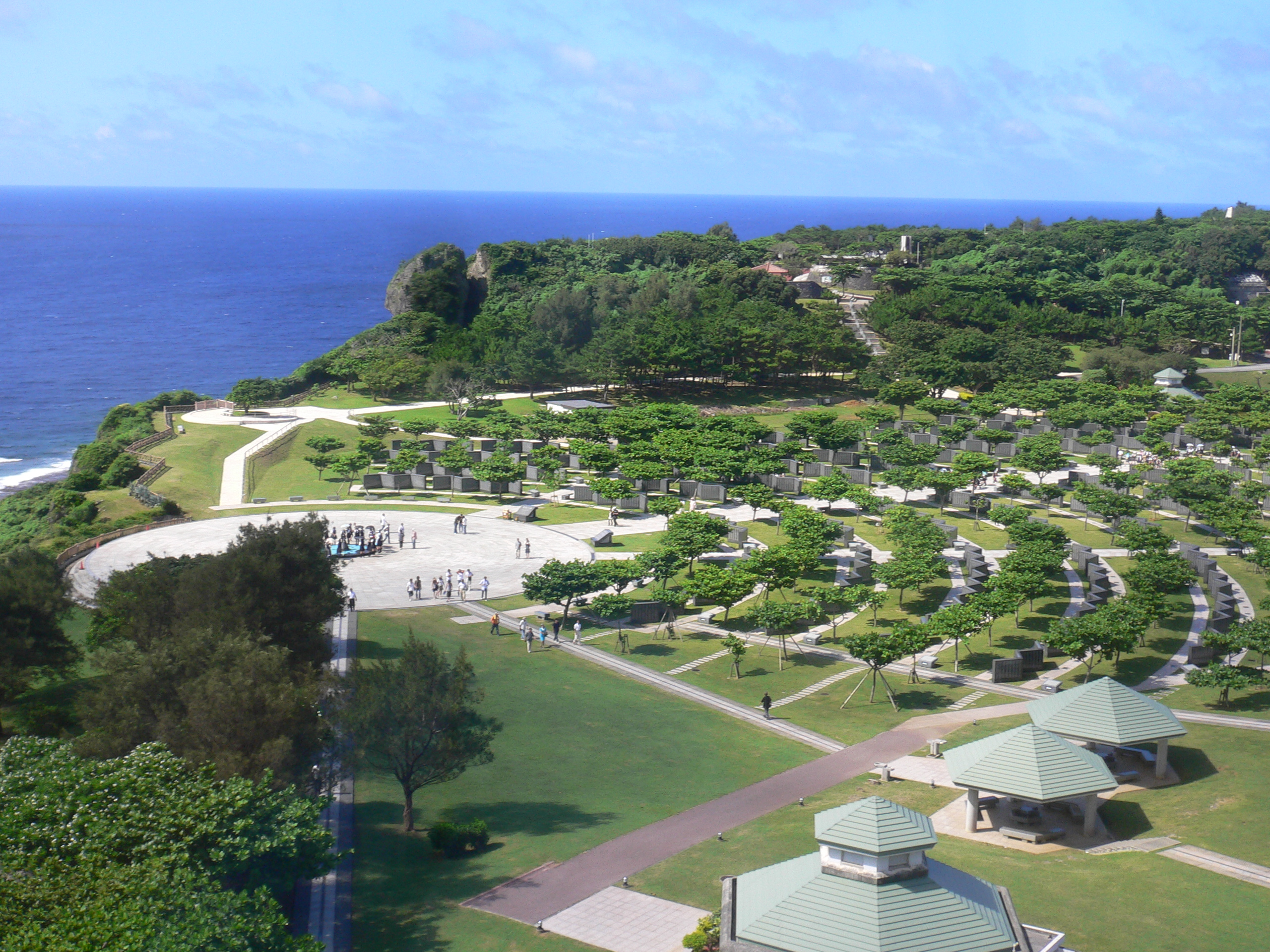
- Cornerstone of Peace
- Interactive map of Okinawa Senseki Quasi-National Park
- Location: Okinawa Prefecture, Japan
- Area: 31.27 km^{2} (12.07 sq mi)
- Established: 15 May 1972

Okinawa Senseki Quasi-National Park (沖縄戦跡国定公園, Okinawa Senseki Kokutei Kōen) is a Quasi-National Park around the battlefields of south Okinawa, Japan. It was established as a Prefectural Park in 1965 and redesignated with the return of Okinawa to Japanese administration in 1972.

== See also ==
- List of national parks of Japan
- Okinawa Kaigan Quasi-National Park
- Battle of Okinawa
- Cornerstone of Peace
