= Hori hori =

Japanese multi-purpose knife

A hori-hori or weeding knife

A hori-hori, sometimes called a "soil knife" or a "weeding knife", is a heavy serrated multi-purpose steel blade for gardening jobs such as digging or cutting. The blade is sharp on both sides and comes to a semi-sharp point at the end.

== History and etymology ==
The hori-hori digging tool, first implemented in Japan, was initially used to excavate plants such as sansai in the mountains carefully.

The word hori (ホリ) means "to dig" in Japanese, and "hori-hori" is an onomatopoeia for a digging sound. The tool itself is commonly referred to in Japan as a "leisure knife" (レジャーナイフ, rejā naifu) or "sansai knife" (山菜ナイフ, sansai naifu).

== Description and uses ==
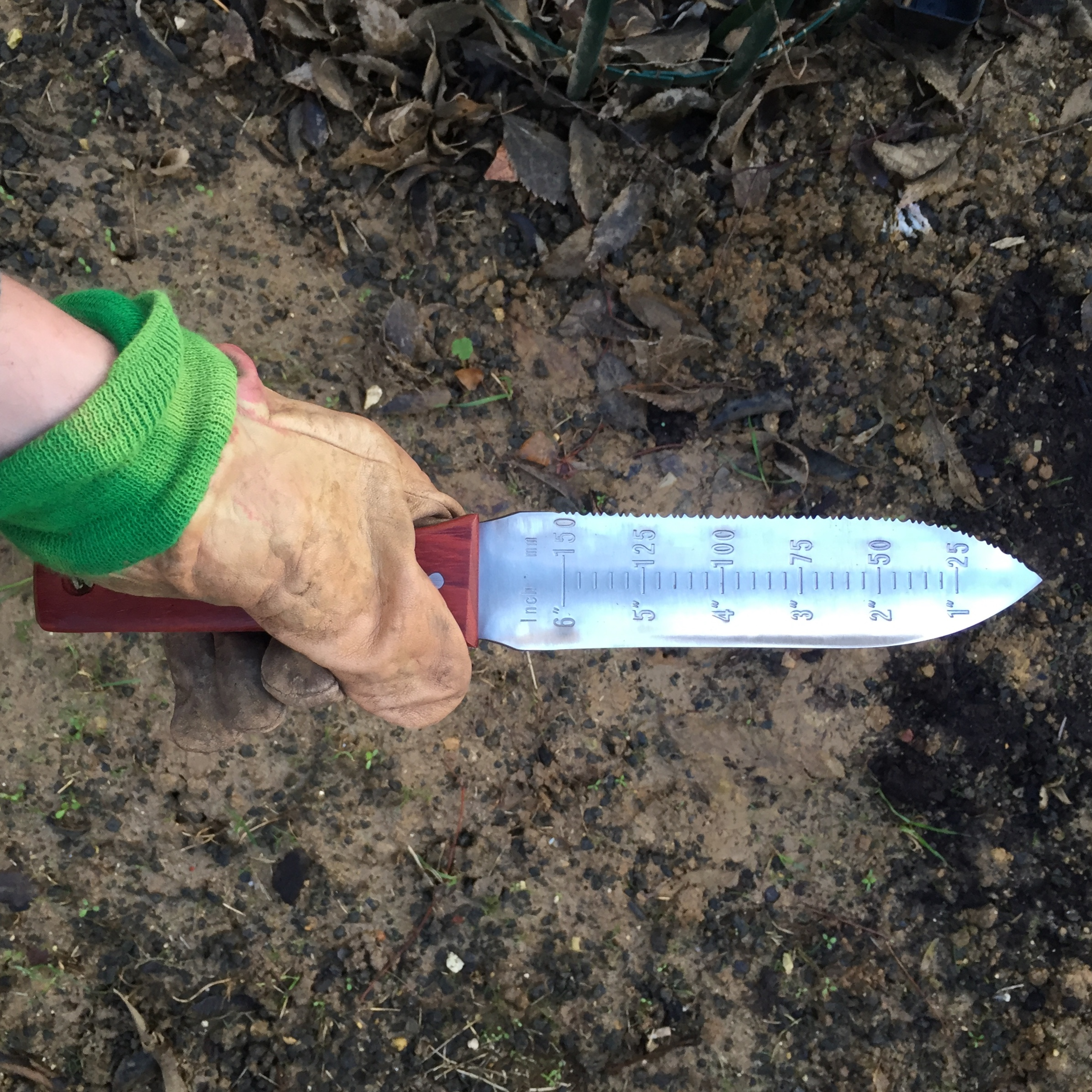
hori-hori knife

The hori-hori has uses in gardening such as weeding, cutting roots, transplanting, removing plants, sod cutting, and splitting perennials. The blade is made of concave-shaped carbon or stainless steel, making it ideal for digging and prying. The blade has a large, smooth wooden handle for comfortable use with one hand. It can serve as a small hand axe.

The tool's total length varies from 11 to 15 inches (280 to 380 mm), depending on the size of the handle. The blade's size can vary, but it is normally around 6 7/8 inches (17 cm) × 1 3/4 inches (4.4 cm). A stainless-steel blade is often polished to a mirror-like finish and is usually paired with a scabbard.

The blade is razor-sharp, and one edge is serrated for cutting through roots and tough soil. Functions include a knife, a saw, a digging tool, or a measuring device for planting bulbs.

== See also ==
- Kaiken (dagger)
- Kunai
- Tantō
- Trowel
