= Ihara =

Ihara (written: 井原 or 伊原) is a Japanese surname. Notable people with the surname include:

- Haruki Ihara (伊原 春樹, born 1949), Japanese baseball player and manager
- Isamu Ihara (井原 勇, 1926–2007), Japanese politician
- Junichi Ihara (伊原 純一, born 1956), Japanese diplomat
- Katsuhiko Ihara (井原 勝彦, born 1943), Japanese rower
- Keiko Ihara (井原 慶子, born 1973), Japanese racing driver
- Les Ihara Jr. (born 1951), American politician
- Masami Ihara (井原 正巳, born 1967), Japanese footballer
- Michio Ihara (born 1928), Japanese sculptor
- Mitsugu Ihara (庵原 貢, 1903–1979), Japanese naval officer
- Rikka Ihara (伊原 六花), Japanese actress, singer, model, and radio personality
- Ihara Saikaku (井原 西鶴, 1642–1693), Japanese poet and writer
- Shintaro Ihara (井原 伸太郎, born 1991), Japanese footballer
- Takatada Ihara (井原 高忠, 1929–2014), Japanese television director and producer
- Tsuyoshi Ihara (伊原 剛志, born 1963), Japanese actor
- Yasuhide Ihara (井原 康秀, born 1973) Japanese footballer
- Yasutaka Ihara (伊原 康隆, born 1938), Japanese mathematician

== See also ==
- Ihara District, Shizuoka, a former district of Shizuoka Prefecture, Japan
- Ihara zeta function
- Ihara's lemma
