= Itoman, Okinawa =

City in Okinawa Prefecture, Japan

Itoman 糸満市 ʔIcuman
- City
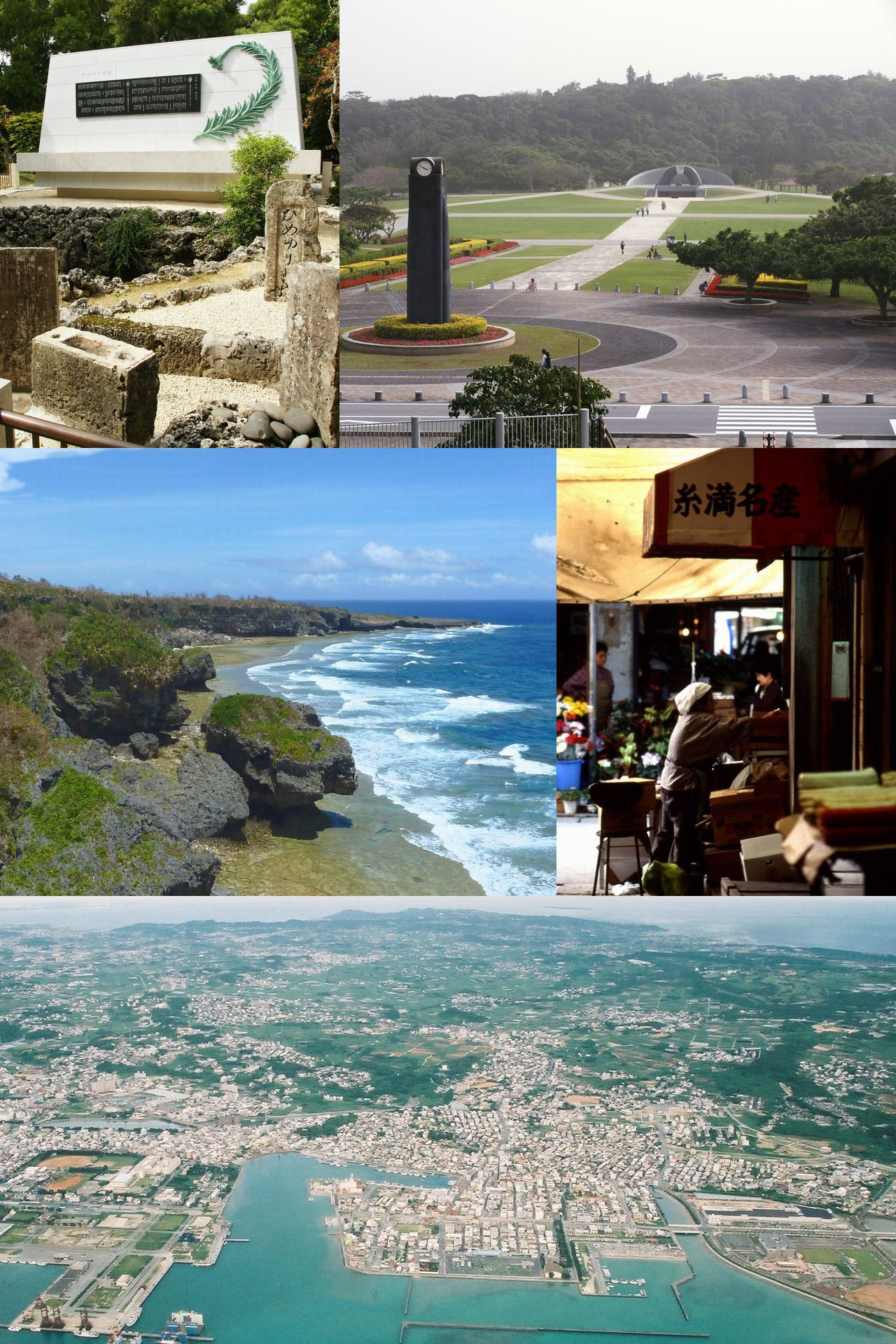
- Clockwise from top left: Cenotaph of Himeyuri, Okinawa Peace Memorial Square, Itoman Central Market, Aerial in Itoman City, View of Akasaki from Cape Kyan

- Flag Seal

- Location of Itoman in Okinawa Prefecture

- Coordinates: 26°7′25″N 127°39′57″E
- Country: Japan
- Region: Kyushu
- Prefecture: Okinawa Prefecture

Government
  - Mayor: Shinei Tōme

Area
  - Total: 46.63 km^{2} (18.00 sq mi)

Population (October 1, 2020)
  - Total: 61,007
  - Density: 1,308/km^{2} (3,389/sq mi)
- Time zone: UTC+9 (Japan Standard Time)
- Tree: Banyan tree
- Flower: Madagascar Periwinkle
- Flowering tree: Bougainvillea
- Fish: Spangled emperor
- Phone number: 098-840-8111
- Address: 1-1 Shiozaki-cho, Itoman-shi, Okinawa Prefecture; 901-0392
- Website: www.city.itoman.lg.jp(in Japanese)

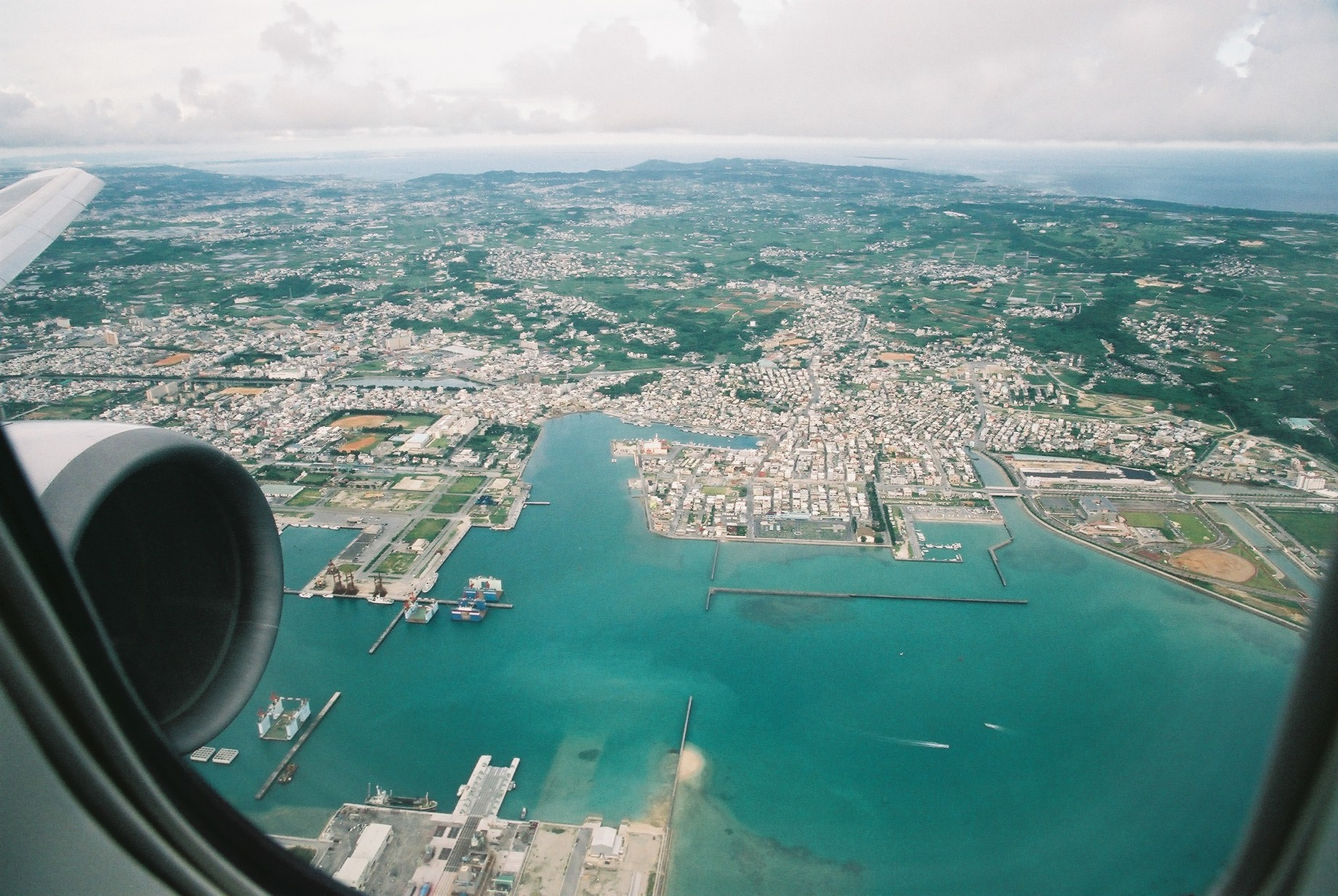
A view from a plane

Itoman (糸満市, Itoman-shi; Japanese pronunciation: [ì.tó̞.mä́ɴ́, -mä́ɰ̃̀.ɕì]; Okinawan: いちゅまん ʔIcuman) is a city located in Okinawa Prefecture, Japan. The city occupies the southern tip of Okinawa Island. As of 1 October 2020, the city has an estimated population of 61,007 and a population density of 1,308.32 inhabitants per square kilometre (3,388.5/sq mi). The total area is 46.63 km^{2} (18.00 sq mi).

== Geography ==
Itoman sits on a flat tableland with craggy rolling hills of Ryukyuan Limestone which range between Cape Baron Bryan to the south and the sugar cane fields in front of Yozadake to the north. The south of the town is known for its steep sea cliffs around Cape Kyan and the Mabuni Cliffs.

=== Administrative divisions ===
The city includes forty-two wards.

- Ahagon (阿波根)
- Arakaki (新垣)
- Arakawa (新川)
- Fukuji (福地)
- Ihara (伊原)
- Ishiki (伊敷)
- Itosu (糸洲)
- Kakazu (賀数)
- Kanegusuku (兼城)
- Kitanamihira (北波平)
- Kohagura (小波蔵)
- Komesu (米須)
- Kuniyoshi (国吉)
- Kyan (喜屋武)
- Mabuni (摩文仁)
- Machibata (町端)
- Maebata (前端)
- Maehira (真栄平)
- Maezato (真栄里)
- Makabe (真壁)
- Minami (南)
- Minaminamihira (南波平)
- Nashiro (名城)
- Niijima (新島)
- Nishi (西)
- Nishikawachō (西川町)
- Nishizaki (西崎)
- Nishizakichō (西崎町)
- Ōdo (大度)
- Ōzato (大里)
- Shiohira (潮平)
- Shiozakichō (潮崎町)
- Shin'yashiki (新屋敷)
- Taketomi (武富)
- Teruya (照屋)
- Toyohara (豊原)
- Tsukazato (束里), merger of Tsukahena (束辺名) and Uezato (上里)
- Uegusuku (宇江城)
- Uenohira (上之平)
- Yamagusuku (山城)
- Yoza (与座)
- Zaha (座波)

== History ==
Itoman has a long history as a fishing port. In the pre-modern period, its fisherman ventured as far as the Indian Ocean. Records indicate that the fisherman made contact with Australia and New Guinea. By 1908 the village of Itoman numbered 8,000 residents, almost all involved in the fishing industry. Men of Itoman worked on fishing boats, and women worked at the transport and sale of fish in the prefectural capital of Naha. In 1918 Naha and Itoman were connected by a horse-drawn tram. The line spanned 12 kilometres (7.5 mi). The Okinawa Prefectural Railways Itoman Line was established in 1924 and operated until 1945.

Itoman was the final front of the Battle of Okinawa in World War II. The area saw enormous casualties to both military forces and civilians. Itoman is noted for the Himeyuri Butai, a field hospital nursing corps of 221 high-school students who committed suicide at the end of the battle.

=== Administrative history ===
Itoman was established as a town in 1908. In 1961 it absorbed the villages of Kanegusuku, Takamine, and Miwa. Itoman was elevated to city status on December 1, 1971.

== Government ==
Itoman is administered from the city hall in Shiozaki. The Itoman Board of Education oversees the preschool, elementary, and middle school, community education centers, and sports facilities of the city. The Itoman City Council consists of 23 members who serve a four-year term and are led by a chairperson (Isao Uehara) and vice-chairperson (Isao Tokuzato) of the council.

== Economy ==
Fishing remains the primary industry of the city of Itoman.

== Transportation ==
=== Roads ===
Japan National Route 331, which connects Itoman and Ōgimi along the eastern coast of Okinawa Island, runs through Itoman and connects the city to other municipalities in Okinawa.

== Sports ==
Itoman co-hosted the 2025 U-18 Baseball World Cup with Naha, Okinawa.

== Cultural Properties ==
- Name (Japanese) (Type of registration)

=== Cultural Properties ===
- Bell from the Former Ryūshō-ji temple (梵鐘(旧竜翔寺鐘)) (Prefectural)
- Buddhist Sculptures by Dana Sōkei (田名宗経謹刻の仏像) (Municipal)
- Kinjō Masuharu Family's residence (main house, pig pen latrines, well, stone wall) (金城増治家住宅 主屋・フール・井戸・石垣) (National)
- Kōchibara and Sūyama-Akahigibaru Munchūs’ tomb inscription (幸地腹、惣山・赤比儀腹両門中墓誌) (Municipal)
- Ōshiro Residence (大城家) (Municipal)
- Stone lions of Teruya (照屋の石彫獅子) (Municipal)
- Sunjagā Spring (潮平ガー) (National)

=== Folk Cultural Properties ===
- Miikagan googles and crafting tools (ミーカガン及び製作具一式) (Municipal)
- Palanquin of Zaha and Kakazu Villages (字座波・賀数の龕) (Municipal)

=== Historic Sites ===
- Gushikawa Castle Site (具志川城跡) (National)
- Komesu Shell Mound (米須貝塚) (Prefectural)

=== Places of scenic beauty ===
- Kyan Coast and Arasaki Coast (喜屋武海岸及び荒崎海岸) (National)

=== Natural Monuments ===
- Kyan Coast and Arasaki Coast (喜屋武海岸及び荒崎海岸) (National)

== See also ==
- Cornerstone of Peace
