= Japan–United States relations =

- Japan: United States

Diplomatic mission
- Embassy of Japan, Washington, D.C.: Embassy of the United States, Tokyo

Envoy
- Ambassador Shigeo Yamada: Ambassador; George Edward Glass

International relations between Japan and the United States began in the late 18th and early 19th century with the 1852–1855 diplomatic but force-backed missions of U.S. ship captains James Glynn and Matthew C. Perry to the Tokugawa shogunate. Following the Meiji Restoration, the countries maintained relatively cordial relations. Potential disputes were resolved. Japan acknowledged American control of Hawaii and the Philippines, and the United States reciprocated regarding Korea. Disagreements about Japanese immigration to the U.S. were resolved in 1907. The two were allies against Germany in World War I.

From as early as 1879 and continuing through most of the first four decades of the 20th century, influential Japanese statesmen such as Prince Iesato Tokugawa (1863–1940) and Baron Eiichi Shibusawa (1840–1931) led a major Japanese domestic and international movement advocating goodwill and mutual respect with the United States. Their friendship with the U.S. included allying with seven U.S. presidents – Grant, Theodore Roosevelt, Taft, Wilson, Harding, Hoover, and Franklin D. Roosevelt. It was only after the passing of this older generation of diplomats and humanitarians, along with the evidence that many Americans believed all Asians to be alike with President Calvin Coolidge's signing of the Immigration Act of 1924 that Japanese militarists were able to gain control and pressure Japan into joining with the Axis powers in World War II.

Starting in 1931, tensions escalated. Japanese actions against China in 1931 and especially after 1937 during the Second Sino-Japanese War caused the United States to cut off the oil and steel Japan required for their military conquests. Japan responded with attacks on the Allies, including the attack on Pearl Harbor, which heavily damaged the US naval base at Pearl Harbor, opening the Pacific theater of World War II. The United States made a massive investment in naval power and systematically destroyed Japan's offensive capabilities while island hopping across the Pacific. To force a surrender, the Americans strategically bombed Japanese cities, culminating in the atomic bombings of Hiroshima and Nagasaki in August 1945. Japan surrendered, and was subjected to seven years of military occupation by the United States, during which the Americans under General Douglas MacArthur eliminated militarism and rebuilt the country's economic and political systems.

In the 1950s and 1960s Japan entered into a military alliance with the United States, and experienced unprecedented economic growth by sheltering under the U.S. nuclear umbrella, taking full advantage of U.S.-backed free trade schemes, and supplying American wars in Korea and Vietnam. Japanese exports to the United States dramatically expanded in the postwar period, with Japanese automobiles and consumer electronics being especially popular. From the late 20th century and onwards, the U.S. economy and Japanese economy have been closely linked through trade, foreign investment, and bilateral coordination. The U.S. government generally considers Japan to be one of its closest allies while American public opinion surveys maintain an overwhelmingly positive view of Japan.

== History ==
=== Early American contacts ===
In the early 1600s, Japan's ruling Tokugawa shogunate enacted a policy of national seclusion known as sakoku (literally, "chained country"). Foreigners were barred from setting foot in Japan save for limited contact with the Dutch and Chinese at Nagasaki, Christianity was banned, and Catholic missionaries were expelled. Japanese citizens were also forbidden to leave Japan in most cases.

There were occasional minor contacts. For example, in 1785 a ship owned and commanded by an Irishman, John O'Donnell, docked at Baltimore and reportedly had ethnically Japanese sailors as part of its crew. And in 1791, two American ships commanded by the American explorer John Kendrick stopped for 11 days on Kii Ōshima island, south of the Kii Peninsula. He is the first American to visit Japan, but there is no Japanese account of his visit.

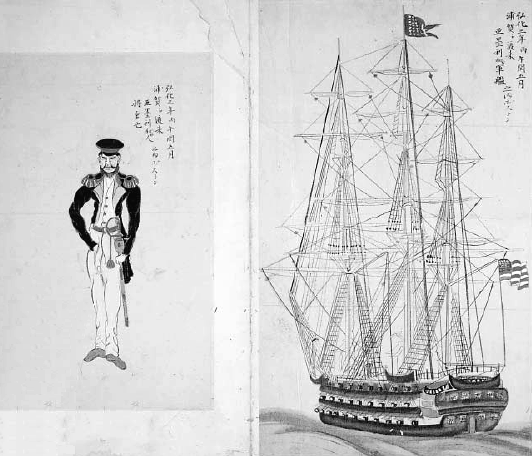
The USS Columbus of James Biddle, and an American crewman in Edo Bay in 1846

In the early 1800s American whaling vessels operating in the North Pacific whaling grounds routinely sought to land in Japan to gather firewood and fresh water, but were routinely turned away or even driven off with cannon fire. Meanwhile, the U.S. government increasingly cast its eyes on Japan as a possible coaling station for the U.S. Navy and a stopping point for U.S. merchants engaged in the lucrative China trade. In 1846, Commander James Biddle was dispatched to Japan by Washington with orders to open trade, anchoring himself in Tokyo Bay with two ships, one of which was armed with seventy-two cannons. However, Japanese representatives refused to negotiate, and he returned home empty-handed.

=== Perry Expedition 1853–1854 ===
In 1848, Captain James Glynn sailed to Nagasaki, which led to the first successful negotiation by an American with sakoku Japan. Glynn recommended to the Congress that any negotiations to open up Japan should be backed up by a demonstration of force; this paved the way for the 1853–1854 expedition of US Navy Commodore Matthew Perry.

The Perry Expedition (Japanese: 黒船来航; Hepburn: Kurofune Raikō, lit. 'Arrival of the Black Ships') lasted from 1853 to 1854. It was a significant diplomatic and military undertaking of the United States Navy towards the Tokugawa Shogunate in Japan. The expedition involved two separate voyages by American warships with objectives such as exploration, surveying, and establishing diplomatic relations and trade agreements with countries in the region. The primary aim of the mission was to establish contact with the Japanese government and open up Japanese ports to American trade, which was a top priority. Under the command of Commodore Matthew Calbraith Perry, who received orders from President Millard Fillmore, the expedition aimed to end Japan's 220-year-old policy of isolation by using gunboat diplomacy if necessary. As a result, the Perry Expedition played a crucial role in establishing diplomatic relations between Japan and the western Great Powers, leading to the collapse of the Tokugawa shogunate and the restoration of the Emperor in the Meiji Restoration of 1868. Furthermore, Japan's growing trade relationships with the world after the expedition resulted in the rise of Japonisme, a cultural trend where Japanese culture influenced art in Europe and America.

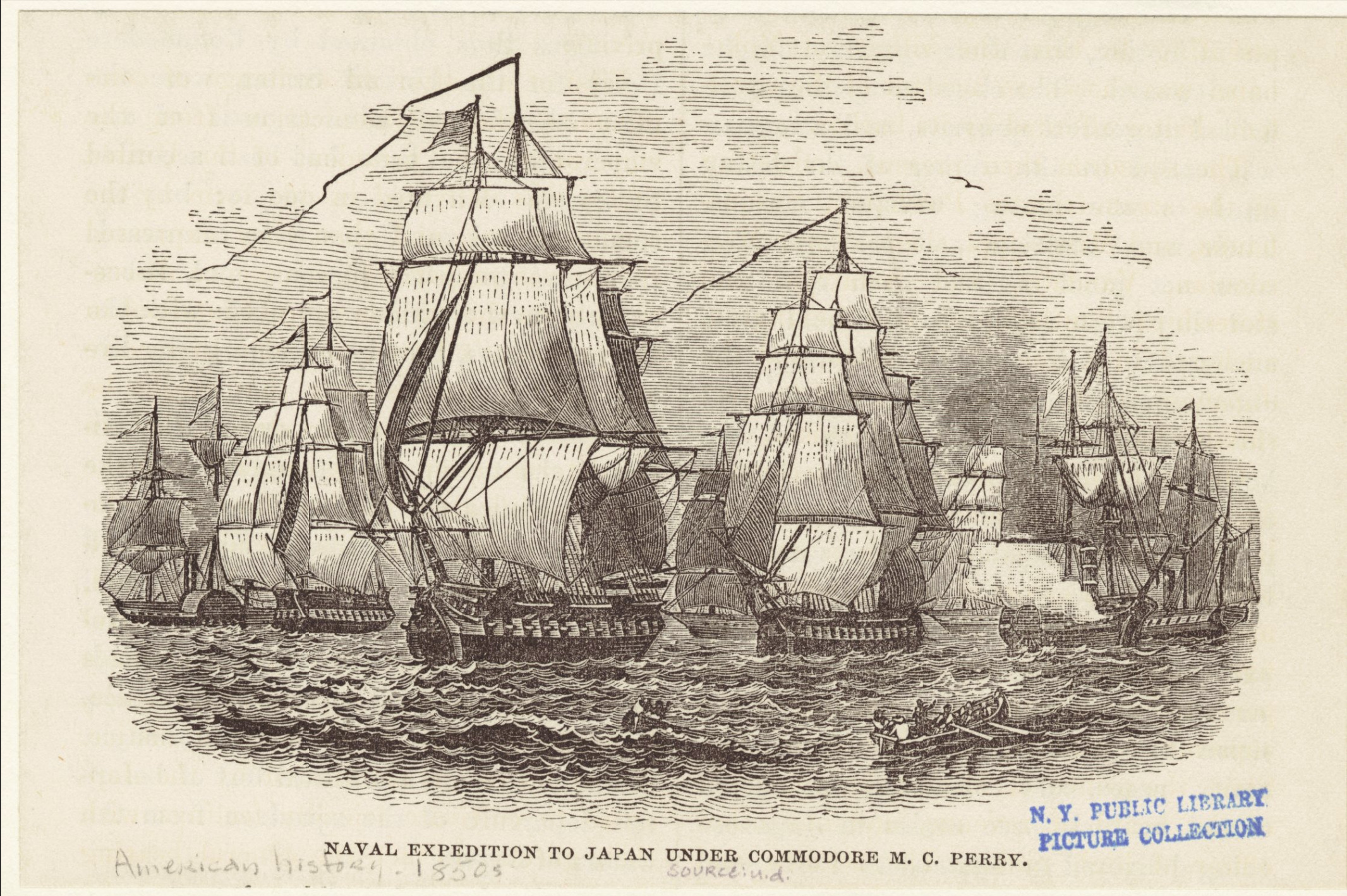
Commodore Perry's fleet for his second visit to Japan in 1854

In 1852, American Commodore Matthew C. Perry embarked from Norfolk, Virginia, for Japan, in command of a squadron tasked with negotiating a trade treaty with Japan. Aboard a black-hulled steam frigate, he ported Mississippi, Plymouth, Saratoga, and Susquehanna at Uraga Harbor near Edo (present-day Tokyo) on July 8, 1853, and he was met by representatives of the Tokugawa Shogunate. They told him to proceed to Nagasaki, where the sakoku laws allowed limited trade by the Dutch. Perry refused to leave, and he demanded permission to present a letter from President Fillmore, threatening force if he was denied. Japan had shunned modern technology for centuries, and the Japanese military would not be able to resist Perry's ships; these "Black Ships" would later become a symbol of threatening Western technology in Japan. The Dutch behind the scenes smoothed the American treaty process with the Tokugawa shogunate. Perry returned in March 1854 with twice as many ships, finding that the delegates had prepared a treaty embodying virtually all the demands in Fillmore's letter; Perry signed the U.S.-Japan Treaty of Peace and Amity on March 31, 1854, and returned home a hero.

Perry had a missionary vision to bring an American presence to Japan. His goal was to open commerce and more profoundly to introduce Western morals and values. The treaty gave priority to American interests over Japan's. Perry's forceful opening of Japan was used before 1945 to rouse Japanese resentment against the United States and the West; an unintended consequence was to facilitate Japanese militarism.

=== Harris treaty of 1858 ===
Townsend Harris (1804–1878) served 1856–1861 as the first American diplomat after Perry left. He won the confidence of the Japanese leaders, who asked his advice on how to deal with Europeans. In 1858, Harris successfully concluded a full trade treaty with Japan, remembered in the United States as the "Harris Treaty of 1858." Via the new treaty, Harris obtained the privilege of Americans to reside in Japan in five "treaty ports" and travel in designated areas. The treaty also banned the opium trade, established extremely low tariffs favorable to American merchants, and guaranteed extraterritoriality for American citizens in Japan. Following the conclusion of the Harris Treaty, other western powers, including Great Britain, France, the Netherlands, and Russia, rushed to secure "unequal treaties" of their own from Japan; these treaties closely followed the American model and granted similar rights to treaty ports and extraterritoriality. The extreme one-sidedness of the new treaties caused significant domestic unrest within Japan, and contributed to the collapse of the 250-year-old Tokugawa Shogunate just ten years later.

=== Japanese Embassy to the United States ===
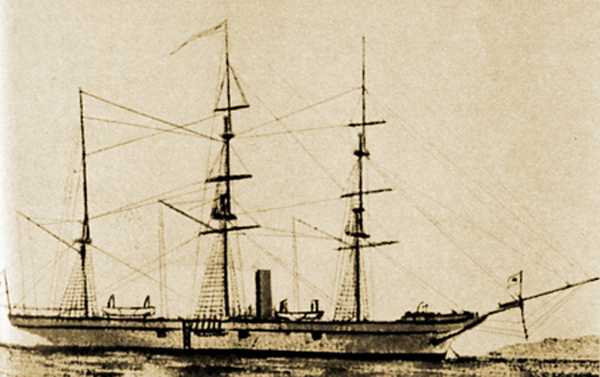
Kanrin Maru, Japan's first screw-driven steam warship, transported 1860s delegation to San Francisco.

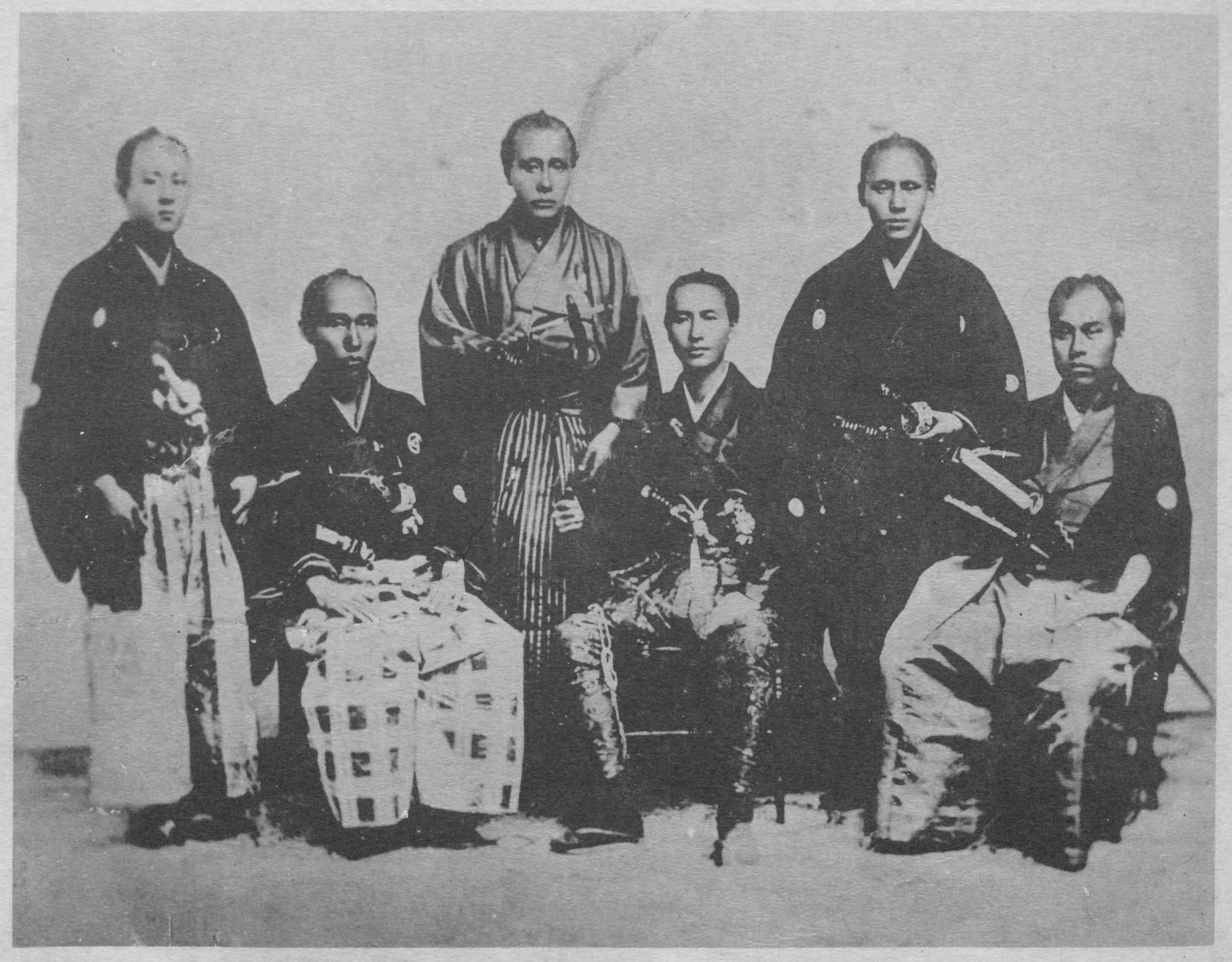
Members of the Japanese Embassy to the United States (1860). Sailors of the Kanrin Maru. Fukuzawa Yukichi sits on the right.

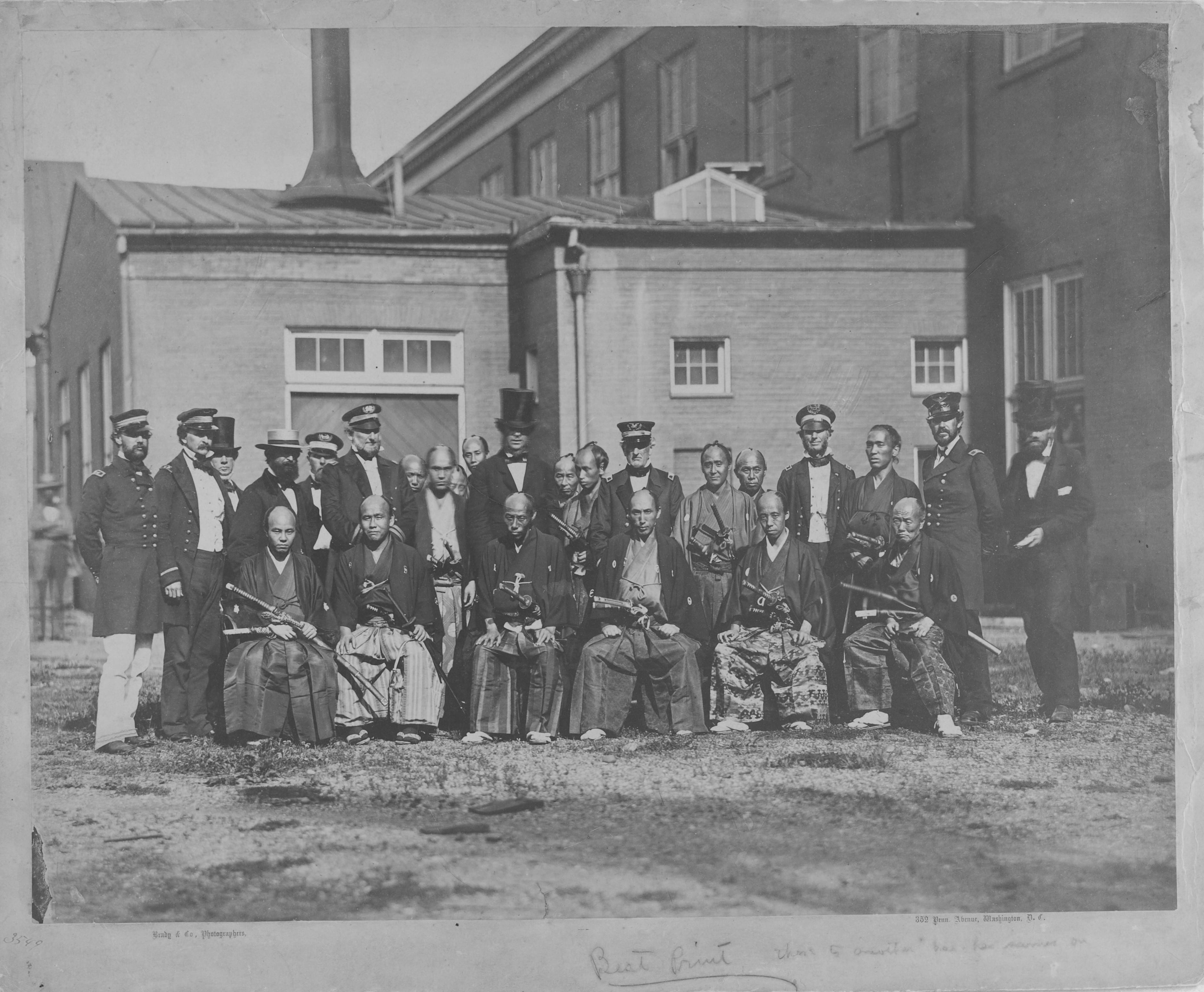
The Japanese Embassy to the United States (1860)

Two years later, the Shōgun sent Kanrin Maru on a mission to the United States, intending to display Japan's mastery of Western navigation techniques and naval engineering. On January 19, 1860, Kanrin Maru left the Uraga Channel for San Francisco. The delegation included Katsu Kaishu as ship captain, Nakahama Manjirō and Fukuzawa Yukichi. From San Francisco, the embassy continued to Washington via Panama on American vessels.

Japan's official objective with this mission was to send its first embassy to the United States and to ratify the new Treaty of Friendship, Commerce, and Navigation between the two governments. The Kanrin Maru delegates also tried to revise some of the unequal clauses in Perry's treaties; they were unsuccessful.

The Japanese Embassy marked a mile stone in US-Japan relations. Its marks the first time a Japanese delegate is sent to the United States. Highlighting the establishment of official bilateral relations other than the previous Harris Treaty and Perry's clauses within the Unequal Treaties. In addition to that, this marks the first official diplomatic acts of Japan and the United States on the U.S. mainland. The Embassy experience was recounted as showing keen interest in American technology, sciences and industrialization.

Townsend Harris returned to the United States in 1861 after five years as the main U.S. diplomat in Japan. Harris was succeeded by Robert H. Pruyn, a New York politician who was a close friend and ally of Secretary of State William Henry Seward. Pruyn served from 1862 to 1865 and oversaw successful negotiations following the Shimonoseki bombardment.

=== From 1865 to 1890 ===
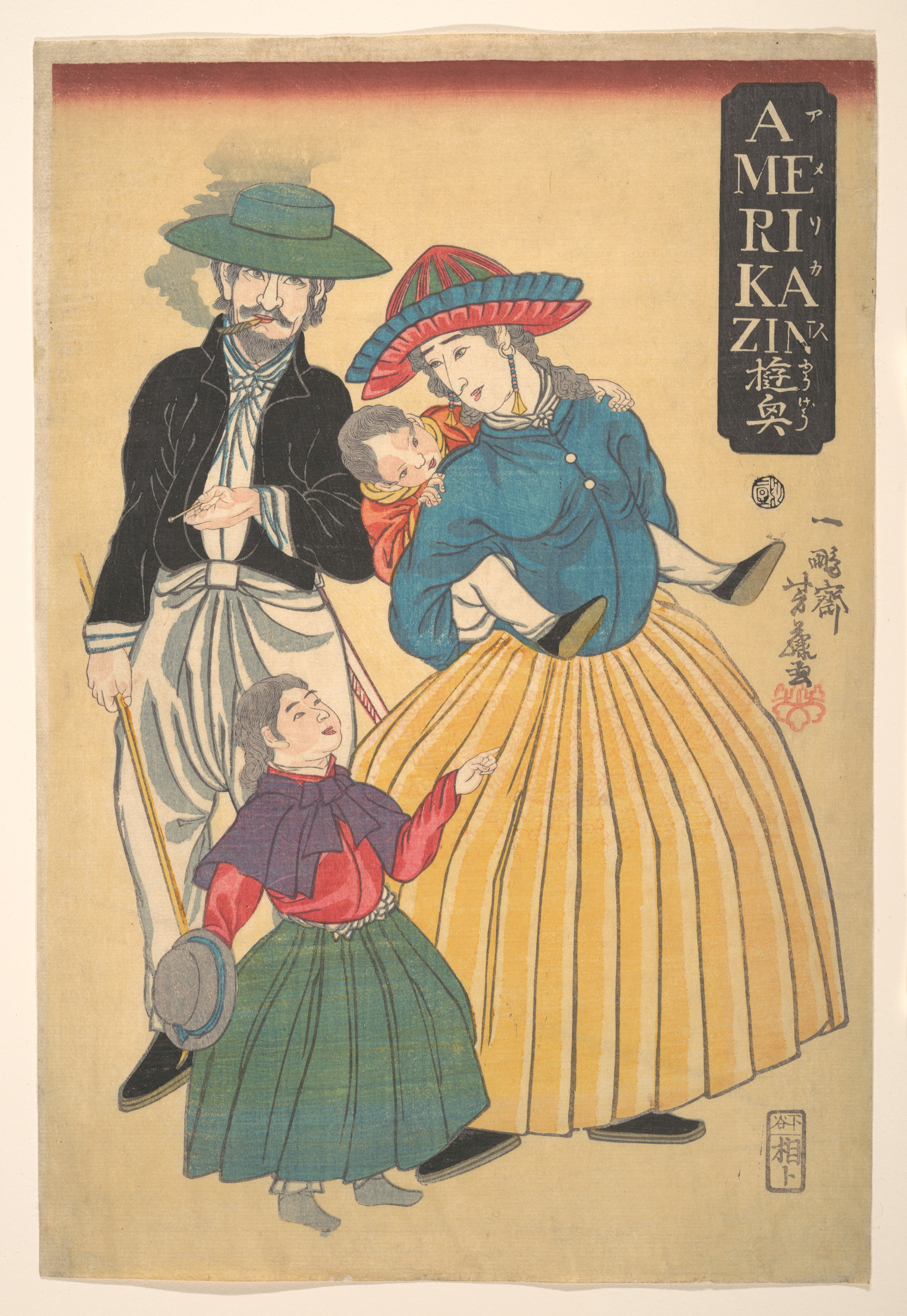
White American family in Yokohama, 1861

The Meiji Restoration after 1868 marked the beginning of a new era in Japan, during which the country underwent significant modernization and westernization. The United States supported Japan's efforts to modernize, and American advisers played a role in Japan's development. Japanese Americans immigrated in large numbers to Hawaii (which joined the U.S. in 1898) and also to farmlands and fishing towns on the West Coast. The Japanese population grew rapidly during this period, which created tension and discrimination.

Both nations experienced very high rates of industrial growth, urbanization, and modernization. The United States relied on both imported engineers and mechanics, and its own growing base of innovators, while Japan relied primarily on learning European technology.

=== 1890–1937 ===
==== Hawaii, Philippines ====
The American annexation of Hawaii in 1898 was stimulated in part by fear that otherwise Japan would annex the Hawaiian Kingdom first.

When King Kalākaua embarked on a world tour in 1881, he tried to forestall American ambitions by offering a plan to Emperor Meiji for putting Hawaii under the protection of the Empire of Japan with an arranged marriage between his niece Kaʻiulani and Japanese Prince Higashifushimi Yorihito.

However Germany was the alternative to American takeover of the Philippines in 1900, and Tokyo preferred the U.S. to take those islands from Spain. These events were part of the American goal of transitioning into a naval world power, but it needed to find a way to avoid a military confrontation in the Pacific with Japan.

In the late 19th century, the opening of sugar plantations in the Kingdom of Hawaii led to the immigration of large numbers of families from China, Portugal and the Philippines. According to Thomas Bailey, the Kingdom of Hawaii sought to offset the preponderance of the Chinese plantation workers. In 1886 it negotiated an immigration convention with Tokyo, resulting in a rapid increase from 116 Japanese in 1883 to 24,400 in 1896, out of a population of 109,000. The Republic of Hawaii (which came to power in 1893) decided to call a halt, and looked to annexation to the United States as a permanent solution. Tokyo protested the annexation to no avail, and continued to send workers to California. When Hawaii was annexed in 1898, the Japanese were the largest element of the population. Although immigration from Japan largely ended by 1907, they have remained the largest element ever since.

==== From 1900 to 1914 ====
One of Theodore Roosevelt's high priorities during his presidency, was the maintenance of friendly relations with Japan. Two of the most influential Japanese statesmen that Roosevelt allied with to promote goodwill were Baron Shibusawa Eiichi and Prince Tokugawa Iesato.

Charles Neu concludes the Roosevelt policies were a success:

By the close of his presidency it was a largely successful policy based upon political realities at home and in the Far East and upon a firm belief that friendship with Japan was essential to preserve American interests in the Pacific ... Roosevelt's diplomacy during the Japanese-American crisis of 1906-1909 was shrewd, skillful, and responsible.

===== Severe tensions in 1907 =====
Vituperative anti-Japanese sentiment (especially on the West Coast) soured relations in the early 20th century. President Theodore Roosevelt did not want to anger Japan by passing legislation to bar Japanese immigration to the U.S. as had been done for Chinese immigration. Instead there was an informal "Gentlemen's Agreement of 1907" between the foreign ministers Elihu Root and Japan's Tadasu Hayashi. The Agreement said Japan would stop emigration of Japanese laborers to the U.S. or Hawaii, and there would not be segregation in California. The agreements remained effect until 1924 when Congress forbade all immigration from Japan—a move that angered Japan.

In 1907, there was widespread speculation among experts in Europe, the United States, and Japan that a war was likely between the United States and Japan. The main cause was intense Japanese resentment against the mistreatment of Japanese in California. Repeatedly in 1907, Roosevelt received warnings from authoritative sources at home and abroad that war with Japan was imminent. The British ambassador to Japan reported to his foreign minister in London that, "the Japanese government are fully impressed with the seriousness of the immigration question. Roosevelt listened closely to the warnings but believed that Japan did not in fact have good reason to attack; nevertheless the risk was there. He told Secretary of State Elihu Root:

the only thing that will prevent war is the Japanese feeling that we shall not be beaten, and this feeling we can only excite by keeping and making our navy efficient in the highest degree. It was evidently high time that we should get our whole battle fleet on a practice voyage to the Pacific."

Pulitzer prize-winning biographer Henry F. Pringle states that sending the Great White Fleet so dramatically to Japan in 1908 was, "the direct result of the Japanese trouble." Furthermore, Roosevelt made sure there was a strategy to defend the Philippines. In June 1907 he met with his military and naval leaders to decide on a series of operations to be carried in the Philippines which included shipments of coal, military rations, and the movement of guns and munitions. In Tokyo the British ambassador watched the Japanese reception to the Great White Fleet, and reported to London:

The visit of the American fleet has been an unqualified success and has produced a marked and favorable impression on both officers and men of the fleet – in fact it is have the effect our allies wanted it to and has put an end to all this nonsensical war talk."

Roosevelt quickly solidified friendly relations with the Root–Takahira Agreement whereby the United States and Japan explicitly recognized each other's major claims.

===== Philippines and Korea =====
Major issues regarding the Philippines and Korea were clarified at a high level in 1905 in the Taft–Katsura Agreement, with the United States acknowledging Japanese control of Korea, and Japan recognizing American control of the Philippines. The two nations cooperated with the European powers in suppressing the Boxer Rebellion in China in 1900, but the U.S. was increasingly troubled about Japan's denial of the Open Door Policy that would ensure that all nations could do business with China on an equal basis. President Theodore Roosevelt played a major role in negotiating an end to the war between Russia and Japan in 1904–1905.

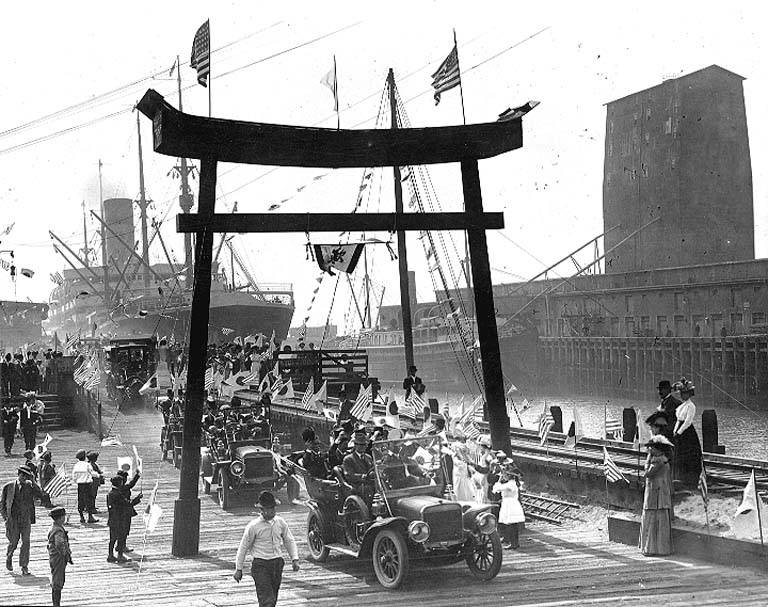
Japanese trade delegation arrives in Seattle, Washington, 1909.

===== Cherry trees =====
In 1912, the people of Japan sent 3,020 cherry trees to the United States as a gift of friendship. First Lady of the United States, Mrs. Helen Herron Taft, and the Viscountess Chinda, wife of the Japanese ambassador, planted the first two cherry trees on the northern bank of the Tidal Basin. These two original trees are still standing today at the south end of 17th Street. Workmen planted the remainder of the trees around the Tidal Basin and East Potomac Park. Three years later, President William Howard Taft reciprocated with a gift to Japan of dogwood trees. To commemorate the centennial of Japan's gift in 2012, the U.S. launched the Friendship Blossoms Initiative, with a gift of 3,000 dogwood trees from the American people to the Japanese people.

===== More trouble in California =====
In 1913 the California state legislature proposed the California Alien Land Law of 1913 that would exclude Japanese non-citizens from owning any land in the state. (The Japanese farmers put the title in the names of their American born children, who were U.S. citizens.) The Japanese government protested strongly. Previously, President Taft had managed to halt similar legislation but President Woodrow Wilson paid little attention until Tokyo's protest arrived. He then sent Secretary of State William Jennings Bryan to California; Bryan was unable to get California to relax the restrictions. Wilson did not use any of the legal remedies available to overturn the California law on the basis that it violated the 1911 treaty with Japan. Japan's reaction at both official and popular levels was anger at the American racism that simmered into the 1920s and 1930s.

===== Protestant missionaries =====
American Protestant missionaries were active in Japan, even though they made relatively few converts. When they returned home, they were often invited to give local lectures on what Japan was really like. In Japan they set up organizations such as colleges and civic groups. Historian John Davidann argues that the evangelical American YMCA missionaries linked Protestantism with American nationalism. They wanted converts to choose "Jesus over Japan". The Christians in Japan, although small minority, held a strong connection to the ancient "bushido" tradition of warrior ethics that undergirded Japanese nationalism. By the 1920s the nationalism theme had been dropped Emily M. Brown and Susan A. Searle were missionaries during the 1880s and 1890s. They promoted Kobe College thus exemplifying the spirit of American Progressive reform by concentrating on the education of Japanese women. Similar endeavors included the Joshi Eigaku Jaku, or the English Institute for Women, run by Tsuda Umeko, and the "American Committee for Miss Tsuda's School" under the leadership of Quaker Mary Morris.

==== World War I and 1920s ====
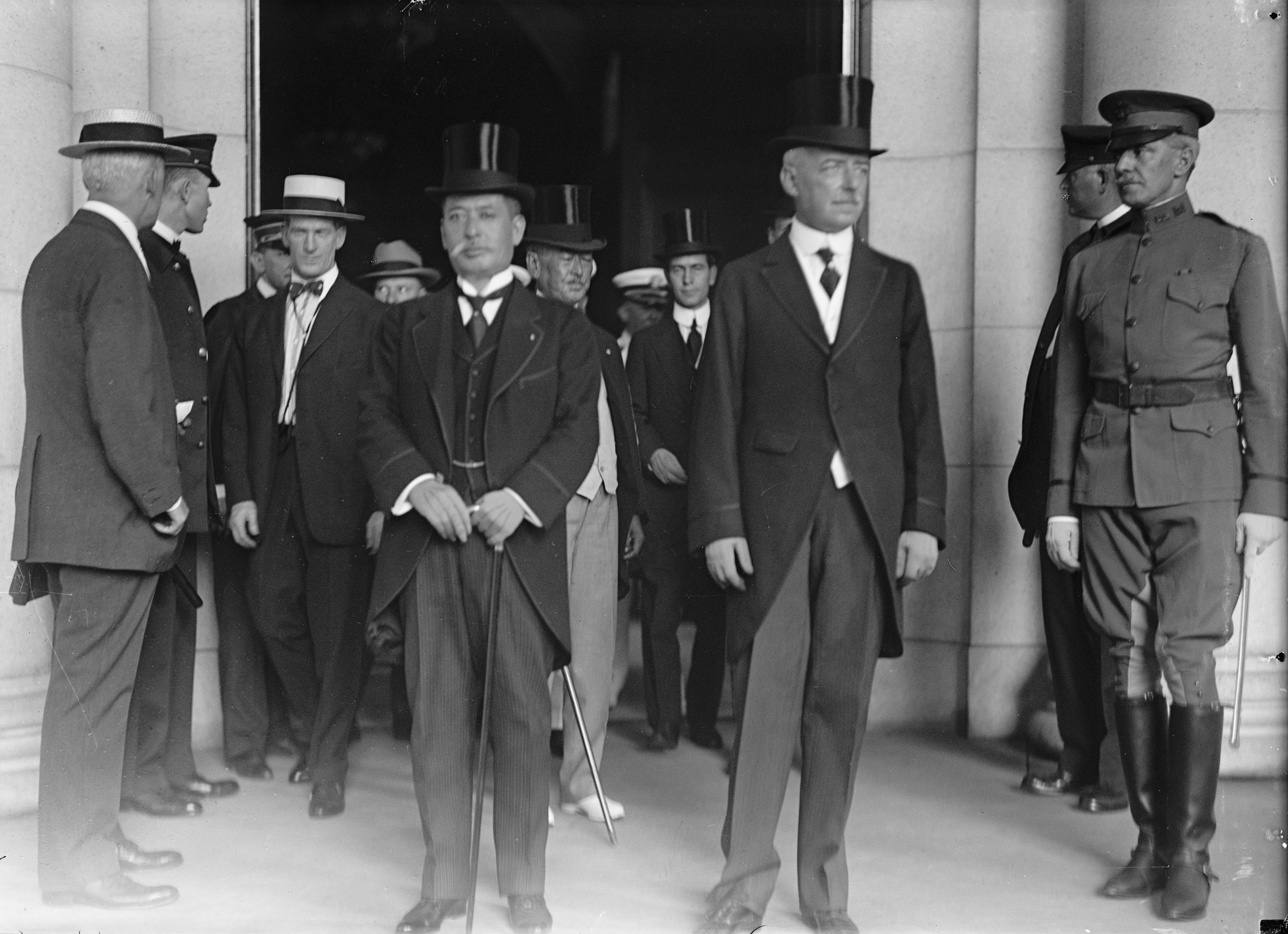
Viscount Ishii Kikujirō, Japanese special envoy, with Secretary of State Robert Lansing in Washington in 1917 for the signing of the Lansing–Ishii Agreement

During World War I, both nations fought on the Allied side. With the cooperation of its ally the United Kingdom, Japan's military took control of German bases in China and the Pacific, and in 1919 after the war, with U.S. approval, was given a League of Nations mandate over the German islands north of the equator, with Australia getting the rest. The U.S. did not want any mandates.

Japan's aggressive approach in its dealings with China, however, was a continual source of tension—indeed eventually leading to World War II between the two nations. Trouble arose between Japan on the one hand and China, Britain and the U.S. on the other over Japan's Twenty-One Demands made on China in 1915. These demands forced China to acknowledge Japanese possession of the former German holdings and its economic dominance of Manchuria, and had the potential of turning China into a puppet state. Washington expressed strongly negative reactions to Japan's rejection of the Open Door Policy. In the Bryan Note issued by Secretary of State William Jennings Bryan on March 13, 1915, the U.S., while affirming Japan's "special interests" in Manchuria, Mongolia and Shandong, expressed concern over further encroachments to Chinese sovereignty.

In 1917, the Lansing–Ishii Agreement was negotiated. Secretary of State Robert Lansing specified American acceptance that Manchuria was under Japanese control, while still nominally under Chinese sovereignty. Japanese foreign minister Ishii Kikujiro noted Japanese agreement not to limit American commercial opportunities elsewhere in China. The agreement also stated that neither would take advantage of the war in Europe to seek additional rights and privileges in Asia.

At the Paris Peace Conference in 1919, Japan insisted that Germany's concessions in China, especially in the Shandong Peninsula, be transferred to Japan. President Woodrow Wilson fought vigorously against Japan's demands regarding China, but backed down upon realizing the Japanese delegation had widespread support. In China there was outrage and anti-Japanese sentiment escalated. The May Fourth Movement emerged as a student demand for China's honor. The United States Senate Committee on Foreign Relations approved a reservation to the Treaty of Versailles, "to give Shantung to China," but Wilson told his supporters in the Senate to vote against any substantive reservations. In 1922 the U.S. brokered a solution of the Shandong Problem. China was awarded nominal sovereignty over all of Shandong, including the former German holdings, while in practice Japan's economic dominance continued.

Japan and the U.S. agreed on terms of naval limitations at the Washington Conference of 1921, with a ratio of naval force to be 5–5–3 for the U.S., Britain, and Japan. Tensions arose with the 1924 American immigration law that prohibited further immigration from Japan.

==== 1929–1937: Militarism and tension between the wars ====
By the 1920s, Japanese intellectuals were underscoring the apparent decline of Europe as a world power, and increasingly saw Japan as the natural leader for all of East Asia. However, they identified a long-term threat from Western colonial powers in Asia deliberately blocking Japan's aspirations, especially regarding control of China. The goal became "Asia for the Asians" as Japan began mobilizing anti-colonial sentiment in India and Southeast Asia. Japan took control of Manchuria in 1931 over the strong objections of the League of Nations, Britain and especially the United States. In 1937, it seized control of the main cities on the East Coast of China, over strong American protests. Japanese leaders thought their deeply Asian civilization gave it a natural right to this control and refused to negotiate Western demands that it withdraw from China.

=== 1937–1945 ===
Relations between Japan and the United States became increasingly tense after the Mukden Incident and the subsequent Japanese military seizure of parts of China in 1937–39. American outrage focused on the Japanese attack on the US gunboat USS Panay in Chinese waters in late 1937. Japan apologized after the attack—and the atrocities of the Nanjing Massacre at the same time. The United States had a powerful naval presence in the Pacific, and it was working closely with the British and the Dutch governments. When Japan seized Indochina (now Vietnam) in 1940–41, the United States, along with Australia, Britain and the Dutch government in exile, boycotted Japan via a trade embargo. They cut off 90% of Japan's oil supply, and Japan had to either withdraw from China or go to war with the US and Britain as well as China to get the oil.

Under the Washington Naval treaty of 1922 and the 1930 London Naval treaty, the American navy was to be larger than the Japanese navy by a ratio of 10:7. However, by 1934, the Japanese ended their disarmament policies and enabled rearmament policy with no limitations. The government in Tokyo was well informed of its military weakness in the Pacific in regards to the American fleet. The foremost important factor in realigning their military policies was the need by Japan to seize British and Dutch oil wells.

Through the 1930s, Japan's military needed imported oil for airplanes and warships. It was dependent at 90% on imports, 80% of it coming from the United States. Furthermore, the vast majority of this oil import was oriented towards the navy and the military. America opposed Tokyo's expansionist policies in China and Indochina. On July 26, 1940, the U.S. government passed the Export Control Act, cutting oil, iron and steel exports to Japan. This containment policy was seen by Washington as a warning to Japan that any further military expansion would result in further sanctions. However, Tokyo saw it as a blockade to counter Japanese military and economic strength. Accordingly, by the time the United States enforced the Export Act, Japan had stockpiled around 54 million barrels of oil. Washington imposed a full oil embargo on Japan in July 1941.

==== The road to war ====
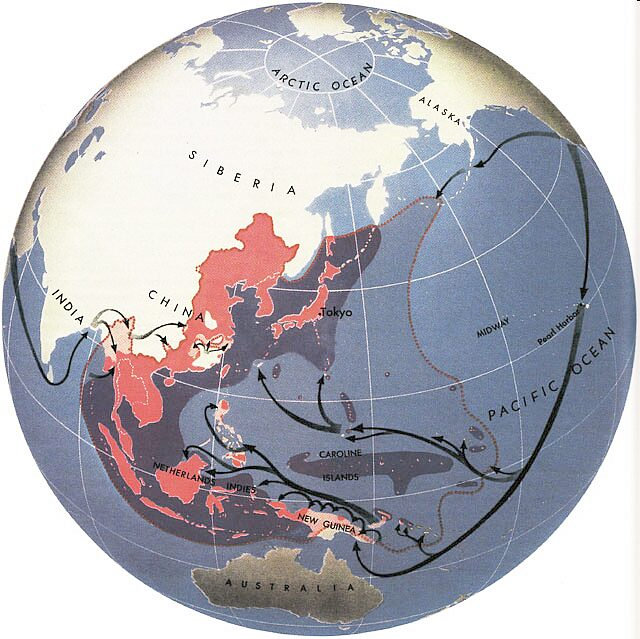
Allied supply routes to China and India and attack lines against Japan, 1941–1945

American public and elite opinion—including even the isolationists—strongly opposed Japan's invasion of China in 1937. President Franklin Roosevelt imposed increasingly stringent economic sanctions intended to deprive Japan of the oil and steel, as well as dollars, it needed to continue its war in China. Japan reacted by forging an alliance with Germany and Italy in 1940, known as the Tripartite Pact, which worsened its relations with the U.S. In July 1941, the United States, China, United Kingdom, and the Netherlands froze all Japanese assets and cut off oil shipments—Japan was extremely vulnerable to such sanctions, as it did not possess oil sources.

Japan had conquered all of Manchuria and most of coastal China by 1939, but the Allies refused to recognize the conquests and stepped up their commitment. President Franklin Roosevelt arranged for American pilots and ground crews to set up an aggressive Chinese Air Force nicknamed the Flying Tigers that would not only defend against Japanese air power but also start bombing the Japanese islands.

Diplomacy provided very little space for the adjudication of the deep differences between Japan and the United States. The United States was firmly and almost unanimously committed to defending the integrity of China. The isolationism that characterized the strong opposition of many Americans toward war in Europe did not apply to Asia. Japan had no friends in the United States, nor in the United Kingdom, nor the Netherlands. The United States had not yet declared war on Germany, but was closely collaborating with Britain and the Netherlands regarding the Japanese threat. The United States started to move its newest B-17 heavy bombers to bases in the Philippines, well within range of Japanese cities. The goal was deterrence of any Japanese attacks to the south. Furthermore, plans were well underway to ship American air forces to China, where American pilots in Chinese uniforms flying American warplanes, were preparing to bomb Japanese cities well before Pearl Harbor.

Great Britain also had a significant presence in the Far East, even though it was apparent that Hong Kong could not resist an invasion for long. The nexus of British forces in the region were concentrated in Singapore. When war eventually came in December 1941, Singapore fell within two months after British forces capitulated.

The Netherlands possessed limited but far from token naval assets stationed in the region to defend their lucrative colonial possessions in the East Indies. The role of Dutch forces was to contribute to a combined allied force of available assets, that together could contest against the Japanese Fleet. Independently, Dutch forces served to delay the Japanese invasion long enough to destroy the oil wells, drilling equipment, refineries, and pipelines that Japan coveted as vital war assets.

Military strategy and decision making in Tokyo were effectively exercised by the Imperial Japanese Army, and rubber-stamped by Emperor Hirohito; the Imperial Japanese Navy also exerted more limited influence. Meanwhile, the civilian government and diplomats were largely irrelevant. The Army regarded their conquest of China as their primary objective, but operations in Manchuria had created a long border with the USSR. Informal, large-scale military clashes with Soviet forces at Nomonhan in summer 1939 demonstrated that the Soviets possessed a decisive military advantage over Japanese land forces. Despite being in an alliance with Germany, Japan did not assist their invasion of the Soviet Union in June 1941 to any significant degree—Japan had signed a non-aggression pact with the Soviet Union in April 1941.

The Japanese realized the urgent need for oil, over 90% of which was supplied by the United States, Britain and the Netherlands. From the Army's perspective, a secure fuel supply was essential for the warplanes, tanks, and trucks—as well as the Navy's warships and warplanes. The solution was to send the Navy south, to seize the oilfields in the Dutch East Indies and nearby British colonies. Some admirals and many civilians, including Prime Minister Konoe Fumimaro, believed that a war with the U.S. would end in defeat. The alternative was the loss of honor and power.

While the admirals were dubious about their long-term ability to confront the American and British navies, they hoped that a decisive blow destroying the American fleet at Pearl Harbor would bring the enemy to the negotiating table for a favorable outcome. Japanese diplomats were sent to Washington in summer 1941 to engage in high-level negotiations. However, they did not speak for the Army leadership, who made the ultimate decisions. By early October both sides concluded that compromise was not feasible. Japan's determination to continue their war in China and America's commitment to defend China ended prospects for peace. The failure of these negotiations would serve as the catalyst for the fall of Japan's civilian government and the Army under General Tojo seizing total control of Japanese foreign policy, whose militarist faction was determined on a course of war with the United States.

==== World War II ====
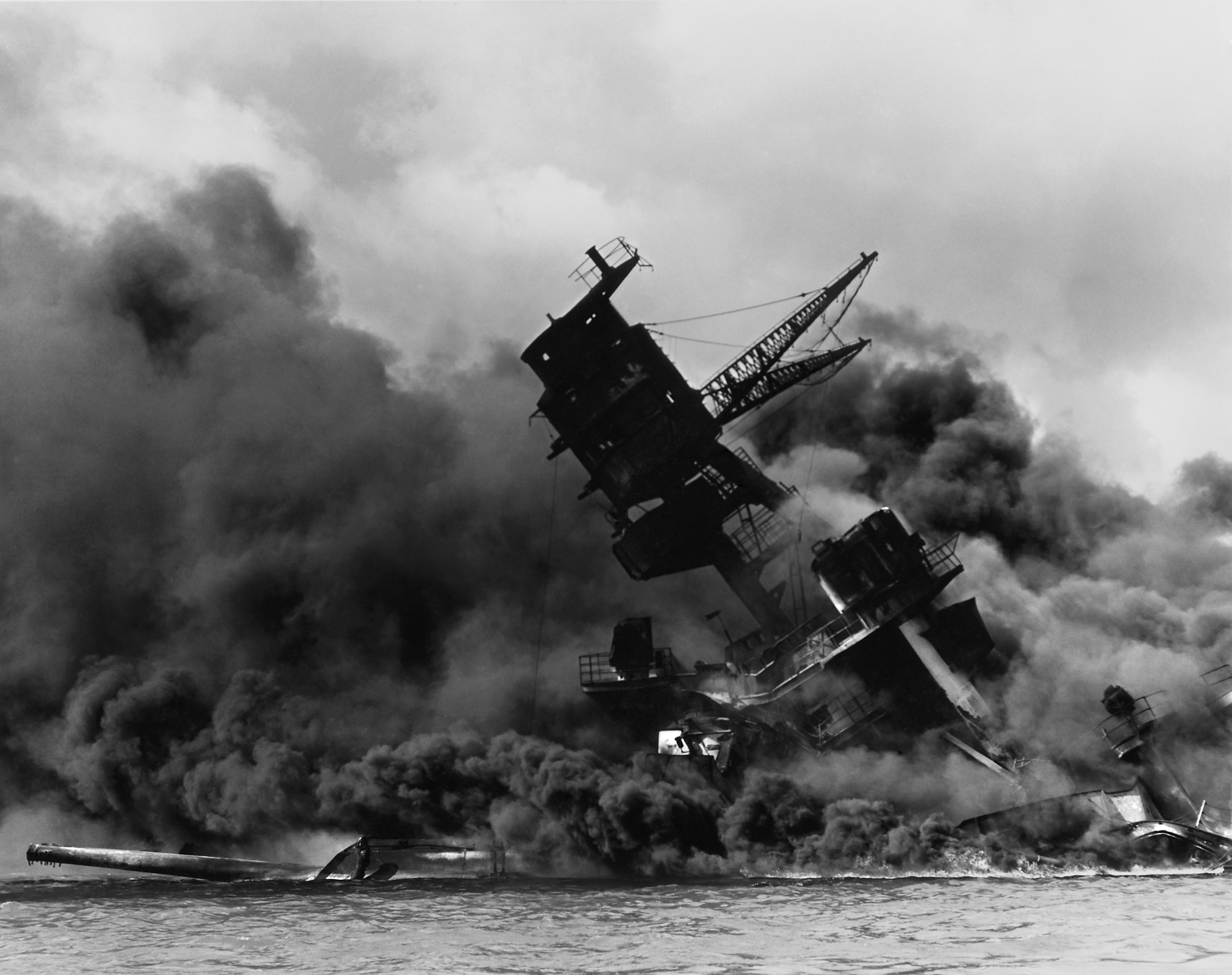
USS Arizona sinking following the Attack on Pearl Harbor

Japan attacked the American navy base at Pearl Harbor, Hawaii, on December 7, 1941. In response, the United States declared war on Japan. Japan's Axis allies, including Nazi Germany, declared war on the United States days after the attack, bringing the United States into World War II.

Despite winning decisive victories at Hong Kong, the Malayan Peninsula, the Dutch East Indies, the Philippines and other Western colonial possessions, Japan's dramatic advances stalled in May 1942. Allied forces successfully repulsed a Japanese naval taskforce at the Battle of the Coral Sea and thereafter the Imperial Japanese Army during the New Guinea campaign. In June, the Imperial Japanese Navy suffered a catastrophic defeat at the Battle of Midway, effectively ending Japanese expansion in the Pacific.

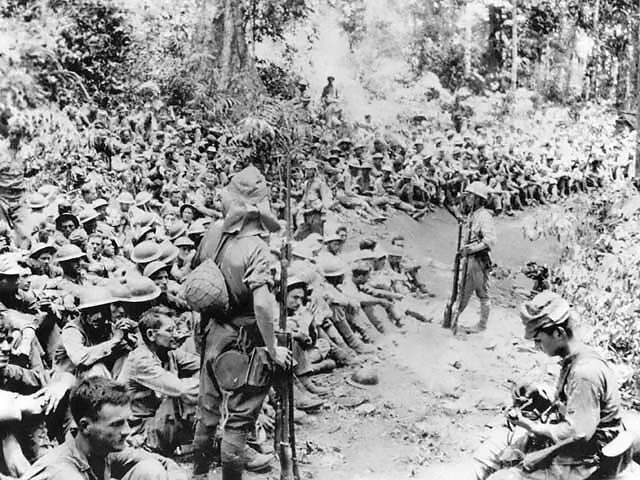
American POW's rest under guard of their Japanese captors during the Bataan Death March

With its defeat at Midway and subsequent allied counter offensives in 1942, Japan now found itself in an increasingly precarious situation. America's industrial might outstripped that of Japan, a material disadvantage which became more apparent as the war progressed. The United States had gained both the strategic initiative and momentum. American and allied forces embarked on a long and bitter island hopping campaign, a campaign which would result in some of the most intense island battles of the Pacific War. By 1945, a succession of defeats had pushed Japan's defensive parameter to Okinawa, just 400 miles from mainland Japan. American aircraft also conducted a sustained bombardment of Japanese cities. Japan's strategic situation deteriorated still further when the Soviet Union declared war on Japan in accordance with the Tehran Conference, which stipulated a Soviet entry into the conflict three months after the defeat of Nazi Germany. The U.S. dropped two atom bombs on Hiroshima and Nagasaki and the Soviet army invaded Japanese held territory in Korea and Manchuria. With fears over the welfare of the Emperor, the collapse of the Japanese military and low civilian morale for the continuation of the war, Emperor Hirohito announced the surrender of Japan on August 15, 1945. The official Instrument of Surrender was signed on September 2, and the United States subsequently occupied Japan in its entirety, while Japan lost all its overseas territories.

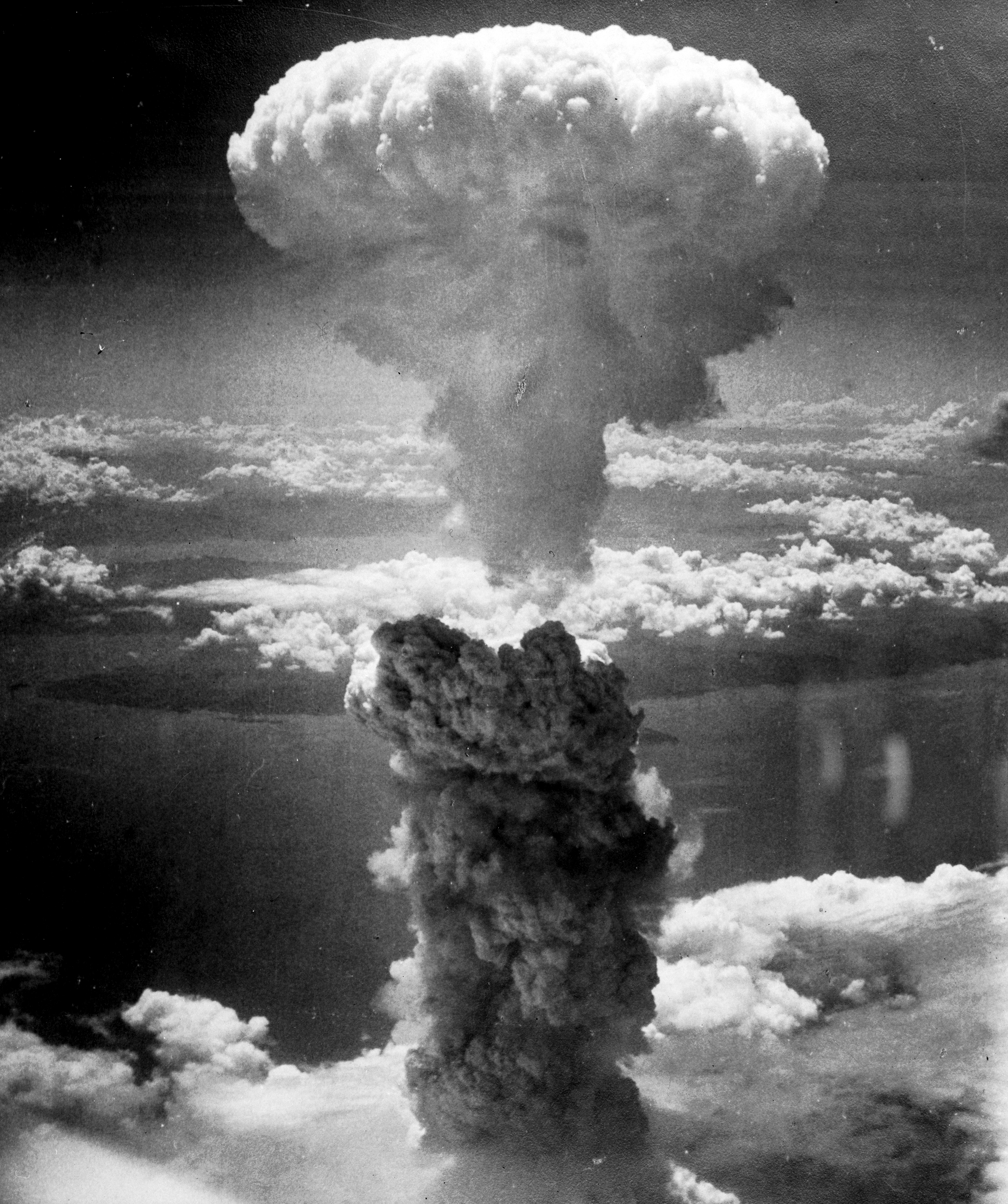
The mushroom cloud resulting from the nuclear explosion over Nagasaki rises 18 km (11 mi, 60,000 ft) into the air.

The Pacific War was notable for the atrocities that were conducted, mostly by Japanese forces. Japanese war crimes ranged from large-scale massacres of non-combatants such as the Manila massacre, the ill-treatment and killing of POWs and civilian internees such as the Bataan Death March and Wake Island massacre, torture, forced labour, and the use of lethal medical experiments such as Unit 731. U.S. forces also committed war crimes, such the mutilation of dead Japanese combatants and rape during the occupation of islands such as Okinawa.

Racial prejudice before the start of the war between the two sides was very much present and contributed to how the countries viewed one another during the war. The Japanese thought of the U.S. and its allies as effete and modern-day barbarians. The historian Dower argues that this was one of the reasons why the Japanese attacked Pearl Harbor, as they did not believe the U.S. would fight a war in a distant land. U.S. prejudice of the Japanese saw them as savage and in-humane after reports of the war in China flooded U.S. media. The reported war crimes during the Second World War by each country helped to exacerbate the already present racial prejudices. The U.S. media expressed Japanese savagery in films, and reports of the de-humanising experiences of captured U.S. GI's resulted in half of all U.S. Pacific forces wanting the complete eradication of Japan. Japanese propaganda preached that Japan was pure and virtuous and encouraged the suicide of its own citizens as a better alternative to surrender, notably during the U.S. island hopping campaign which saw the retreat of a great number of Japanese Military personnel. Fears that U.S. forces would rape, torture and murder those who did not commit suicide were instilled in the civilians, highlighting that it was more honourable to take their own lives. These acts of violence that spawned these racial prejudices at the time were understood as the direct result of the nature and culture of the country and its people. They helped shift public opinion and cause great hatred between the two countries and their citizens.

=== Post–World War II period ===
==== American occupation of Japan, 1945–1952 ====
According to Jonathan Monten:

To convert Japan into a stable liberal democracy, the United States established an extensive occupation structure under the Supreme Command of the Allied Powers (SCAP), led by General Douglas MacArthur. The SCAP agenda included not only framing a new constitution and organizing elections, but a wider array of institutional and economic reforms aimed at creating the conditions for a sustainable liberal democracy and pluralist society. These directives were implemented and administered through the Japanese national bureaucracy, which the United States allowed to remain intact despite the Japanese defeat. The result, according to a 2003 RAND Corporation study, was an occupation that "set standards for post-conflict transformation that have not yet been equaled" (Dobbins et al. 2003).

At the end of the World War II, Japan was occupied by the Allied Powers, led by the United States with contributions from Australia, the United Kingdom and New Zealand. This was the first time that Japan had ever been occupied by a foreign power. In the initial phase of the Occupation, the United States and the other Allied Powers, under the leadership of American general Douglas MacArthur sought to carry out a thoroughgoing transformation of Japanese politics and society, in an effort to prevent Japan from threatening the peace again in the future. Among other measures, the Occupation authorities pressured Emperor Hirohito into renouncing his divinity, disbanded the Japanese military, purged wartime leaders from serving in government, ordered the dissolution of the massive zaibatsu industrial conglomerates that had powered Japan's war machine, vastly increased land ownership with an extensive land reform, legalized labor unions and the Japan Communist Party, gave women the right to vote, and sought to decentralize and democratize the police and the education system. Many of these changes were formalized in a brand new Constitution of Japan, written from scratch by Occupation authorities and then translated into Japanese and duly passed by the Japanese Diet. Most famously, Article 9 of the new constitution, crafted by the Americans, expressly forbade Japan from maintaining an offensive military.

However, as the Cold War began to ramp up, US leaders began to see Japan as less of a threat to peace and more as a potential industrial and military bulwark against communism in Asia. Accordingly, beginning in 1947, Occupation authorities began attempting to roll back many of the changes they had just implemented, in what became known as the "Reverse Course." The Tokyo War Crimes Tribunal of Japanese war criminals was brought to a hasty conclusion, wartime leaders were depurged and encouraged to return to government, the Occupation began cracking down on leftist labor unions, the police were allowed to re-centralize and militarize, and the U.S. government began pressuring the Japanese government to get rid of Article 9 and partially re-militarized, which the war-exhausted Japanese public looked unfavorably on by that point.

In 1950, Occupation authorities collaborated with Japanese conservatives in business and government to carry out a massive "Red Purge" of tens of thousands of communists, socialists, and suspected fellow travelers, who were summarily fired from their jobs in government, schools, universities, and large corporations. In addition to making Japan more safe for free-market capitalism, the Occupation also sought to strengthen Japan's economy handing control over to American banker Joseph Dodge, who implemented a series of harsh measures to tackle inflation and limit government intervention in the economy, known collectively as the "Dodge Line."

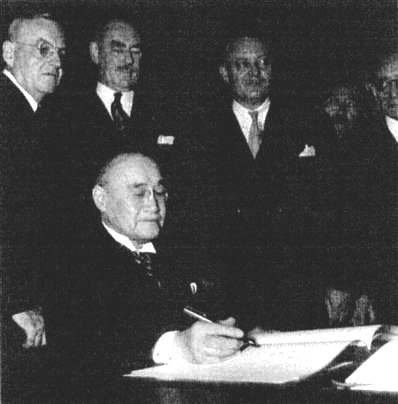
Japanese prime minister Shigeru Yoshida signs the U.S.-Japan Security Treaty, September 8, 1951.

The Occupation finally came to an end in 1952 with the enactment of the San Francisco Peace Treaty, which returned sovereignty to Japan. The treaty was signed on September 8, 1951, and took effect on April 28, 1952. As a condition of ending the Occupation and restoring its sovereignty, Japan was also required to sign the U.S.-Japan Security Treaty, which brought Japan into a military alliance with the United States.

===== Yoshida Doctrine =====
The Yoshida Doctrine was a strategy adopted by Japan under Prime Minister Shigeru Yoshida, the prime minister 1948–1954. He concentrated upon reconstructing Japan's domestic economy while relying heavily on the security alliance with the United States. The Yoshida Doctrine emerged in 1951 and it shaped Japanese foreign policy into the 21st century. First, Japan is firmly allied with the United States in the Cold War against communism. Second, Japan relies on American military strength and limits its own defense forces to a minimum. Third, Japan emphasizes economic diplomacy in its world affairs. The Yoshida doctrine was accepted by the United States; the actual term was coined in 1977. The economic dimension was fostered by Hayato Ikeda who served as finance minister and later as prime minister. Most historians argue the policy was wise and successful, but a minority criticize it as naïve and inappropriate.

==== 1950s: Anti-base protests and the struggle to revise the Security Treaty ====
The original 1952 Security Treaty had established the U.S.-Japan Alliance, but did not put Japan on an equal footing with the United States. Among other provisions inimical to Japanese interests, the Treaty had no specified end date or means of abrogation. On May 1, 1952, just a few days after the Security Treaty came into force, protests were staged around the nation against the ongoing presence of U.S. military bases even though the occupation had officially ended. The protests in Tokyo turned violent, coming to be remembered as "Bloody May Day." In response to this situation, the Japanese government began pushing for a revision to the treaty as early as 1952. However, the Eisenhower administration resisted calls for revision.

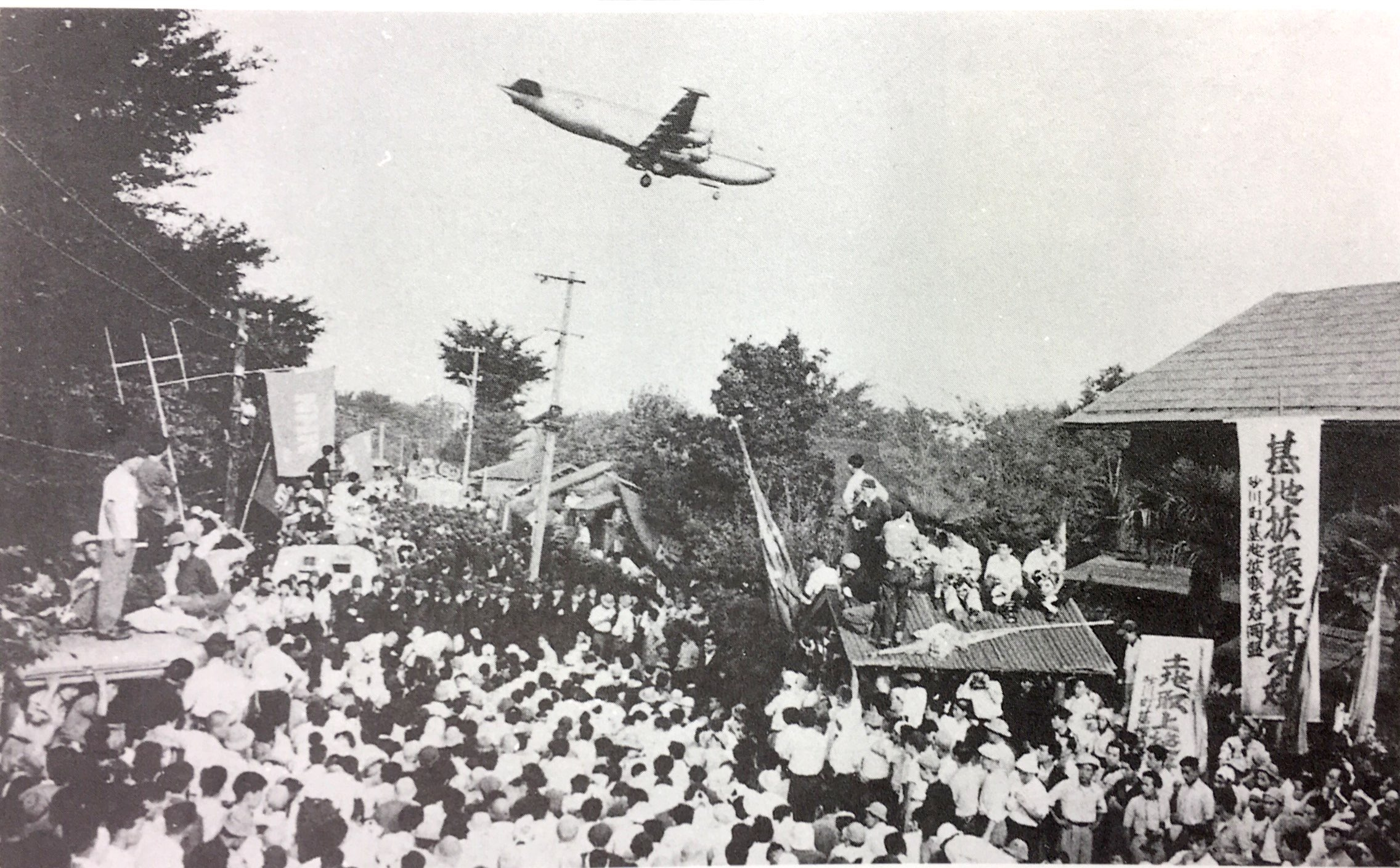
Protesters opposing the planned expansion of the U.S. Air Force's Tachikawa Air Base as part of the Sunagawa Struggle, October 1956

Meanwhile, the ongoing presence of U.S. military bases on Japanese soil caused increasing friction with local residents, leading to a growing anti-US military base movement in Japan. The movement began with protests against a U.S. artillery range in Uchinada, Ishikawa in 1952, and culminated in the bloody Sunagawa Struggle over the proposed expansion of a U.S. air base near Sunagawa village south of Tokyo, lasting from 1955 to 1957. Anti-U.S. sentiment also increased following the Lucky Dragon No. 5 incident in 1954, in which a U.S. nuclear weapons test at Bikini Atoll rained radioactive fallout on a Japanese fishing vessel, inspiring the original Godzilla movie, as well as in the aftermath of the Girard Incident in 1957, when an off-duty U.S. soldier shot and killed a Japanese housewife. The Eisenhower administration finally agreed to significantly draw down U.S. troops in Japan and revise the Security Treaty. Eisenhower lowered the American military presence in Japan from 210,000 in 1953 to 77,000 in 1957, and then again to 48,000 in 1960. Most were now airmen. Negotiations began on a revised treaty in 1958, and the new treaty was signed by Eisenhower and Kishi at a ceremony in Washington, D.C., on January 19, 1960.

Japanese leaders and protesters also pushed for the rapid reversion of smaller Japanese islands that had not been included in the San Francisco Peace Treaty and still remained under U.S. military occupation. Recognizing the popular desire for the return of the Ryukyu Islands and the Bonin Islands (also known as the Ogasawara Islands), the United States as early as 1953 relinquished its control of the Amami group of islands at the northern end of the Ryukyu Islands. But the United States made no commitment to return the Bonins or Okinawa, which was then under United States military administration for an indefinite period as provided in Article 3 of the peace treaty. Popular agitation culminated in a unanimous resolution adopted by the Diet in June 1956, calling for a return of Okinawa to Japan.

Meanwhile, U.S. military intelligence and its successor organization, the Central Intelligence Agency, meddled in Japanese politics, helping to facilitate the rise to power of former suspected Class-A war criminal Nobusuke Kishi. C.I.A. funding and logistical support helped Kishi orchestrate the unification of the Japan's conservative parties into the Liberal Democratic Party in 1955, thus establishing the so-called 1955 System of conservative, anti-communist dominance of Japanese domestic politics. It was only after trusted partner Kishi became prime minister in 1957 that the U.S. considered it possible to revise the Security Treaty. From the 1950s through the 1970s, the C.I.A. would spend millions of dollars attempting to influence elections in Japan to favor the LDP against more leftist parties such as the Socialists and the Communists, although these expenditures would not be revealed until the mid-1990s when they were exposed by The New York Times.

==== 1960s: Anpo protests and Okinawan reversion ====
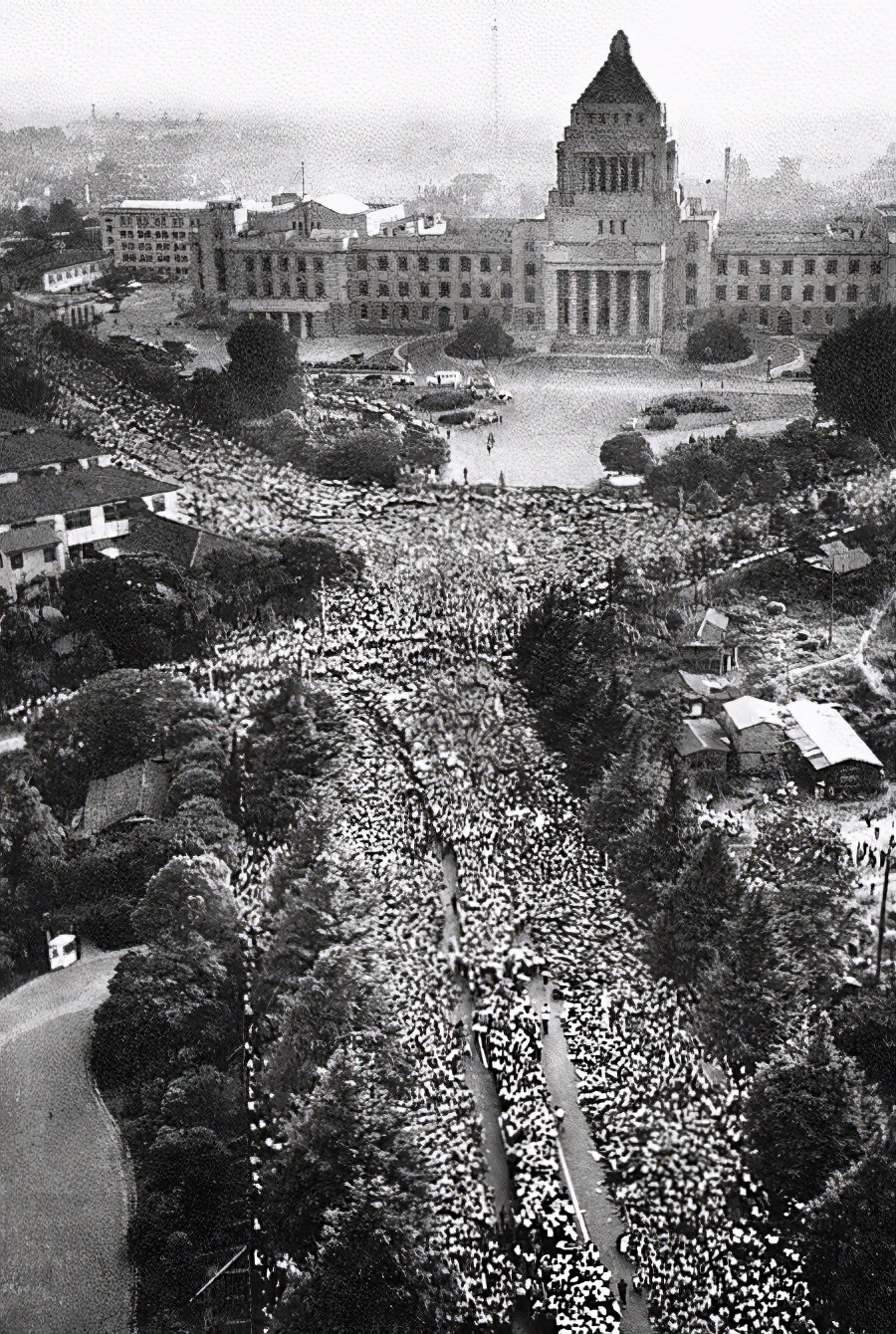
As part of the Anpo protests against the U.S.-Japan Security Treaty, masses of protestors flood the streets around Japan's National Diet building, June 18, 1960.

From a Japanese perspective, the revised U.S.-Japan Security Treaty signed in January 1960, known as "Anpo" in Japanese, represented significant improvement over the original treaty, committing the United States to defend Japan in an attack, requiring prior consultation with the Japanese government before dispatching US forces based in Japan overseas, removing the clause preauthorizing suppression of domestic disturbances, and specifying an initial 10-year term, after which the treaty could be abrogated by either party with one year's notice.

Because the new treaty was better than the old, Prime Minister Kishi expected it to be ratified in relatively short order. Accordingly, he invited Eisenhower to visit Japan beginning on June 19, 1960, in part to celebrate the newly ratified treaty. If Eisenhower's visit had proceeded as planned, he would have become the first sitting US president to visit Japan.

However, many on the Japanese left, and even some conservatives, hoped to chart a more neutral course in the Cold War, and thus hoped to get rid of the treaty and the U.S.-Japan Alliance entirely. Therefore, even though the revised treaty was manifestly superior to the original treaty, these groups decided to oppose ratification of the revised treaty, leading to the 1960 Anpo protests, which eventually grew into the largest protests in Japan's modern history. Meanwhile, Kishi grew increasingly desperate to ratify the new treaty in time for Eisenhower's planned visit. On May 19, 1960, he took the desperate step of having opposition lawmakers physically removed from the National Diet by police and ramming the new treaty through with only members of his own Liberal Democratic Party present. Kishi's anti-democratic actions sparked nationwide outrage, and thereafter the protest movement dramatically escalated in size, as hundreds of thousands of protesters flooded the streets around the National Diet and in city centers nationwide on an almost daily basis. At the climax of the protests on June 15, a violent clash at the Diet between protesters and police led to the death of a female university student, Michiko Kanba. Unable to guarantee Eisenhower's safety and the visit ultimately cancelled, Kishi was forced to take responsibility for his mishandling of the treaty issue by resigning. Nevertheless, the treaty was eventually passed, cementing the U.S.-Japan alliance into place and putting it on a much more equal footing.

The Security Treaty crisis significantly damaged U.S.-Japan relations. The anti-American aspect of the protests and the humiliating cancellation of Eisenhower's visit brought US–Japan relations to their lowest ebb since the end of World War II. In the aftermath of the protests, incoming U.S. president John F. Kennedy and new Japanese prime minister Hayato Ikeda worked to repair the damage. Kennedy and Ikeda also arranged to have a summit meeting in Washington, D.C., in 1961, with Ikeda becoming first foreign leader to visit the United States during Kennedy's term in office. At the summit, Kennedy promised Ikeda he would henceforth treat Japan more like a close ally such as Great Britain. Historian Nick Kapur has argued that this summit was a success, and led to a substantial realignment of the US–Japan alliance in the direction of greater mutuality.

Kennedy appointed sympathetic Japan expert and Harvard professor Edwin O. Reischauer as ambassador to Japan, rather than a career diplomat. Reischauer worked to repair the recent rift in US–Japan relations. Reischauer made "equal partnership" the watchword of his time as ambassador, and constantly pushed for more equal treatment of Japan. Reischauer also embarked on a nationwide listening tour in Japan; he visited 39 of the 47 prefectures. Reischauer's time as ambassador was seen as a success, and he stayed in the role until 1966, continuing on under the administration of Lyndon B. Johnson. However, his time as ambassador ended on a note of tragedy. Reischauer increasingly had to defend the US war in Vietnam, and increasingly felt uncomfortable doing so, ultimately leading to his resignation.

Article 3 of the new treaty promised to eventually return all Japanese territories occupied by the United States in the aftermath of World War II. In June 1968, the United States returned the Bonin Islands (including Iwo Jima) to Japanese administrative control. In 1969, the Okinawa reversion issue and Japan's security ties with the United States became the focal points of partisan political campaigns. The situation calmed considerably when Prime Minister Eisaku Sato visited Washington in November 1969, and in a joint communiqué signed by him and President Richard Nixon, announced the United States had agreed to return Okinawa to Japan by 1972. In June 1971, after eighteen months of negotiations, the two countries signed an agreement providing for the return of Okinawa to Japan in 1972.

The price of these concessions by the United States was staunch support by Japan of the ongoing Vietnam War and U.S. policy of no official relations with Communist China. Adherence to these policies led to frictions within Japan, and protest movements such as the anti-Vietnam War protests organized by groups such as Beheiren. But these frictions proved manageable thanks to the political capital Japanese prime minister Eisaku Satō and Japan's ruling conservatives gained by successfully negotiating Okinawan Reversion.

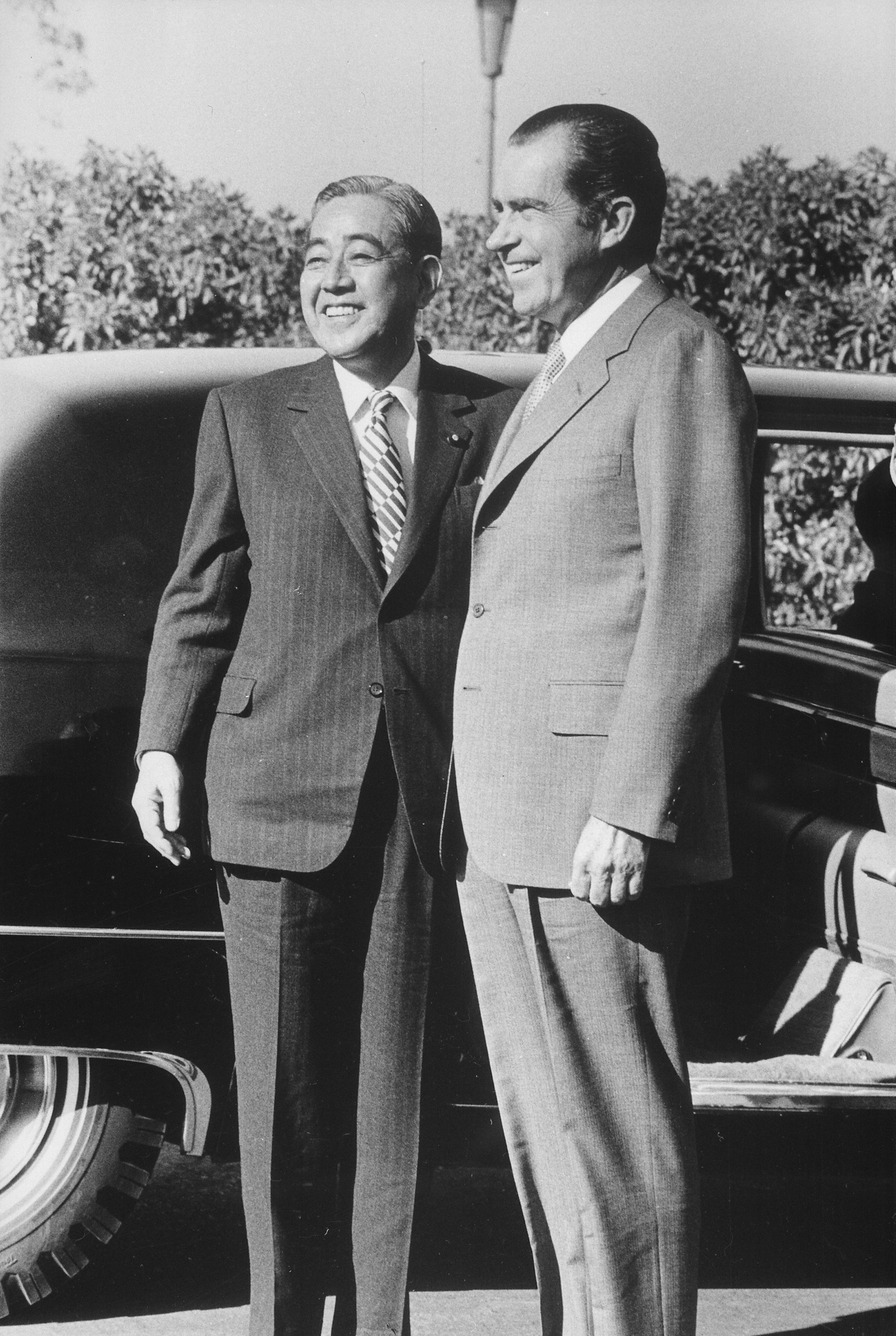
Japanese prime minister Eisaku Satō and U.S. president Richard Nixon, who negotiated the repatriation of Okinawa

==== 1970s: Nixon shocks and oil shocks ====
The Japanese government's firm and voluntary endorsement of the security treaty and the settlement of the Okinawa reversion question meant that two major political issues in Japan–United States relations were eliminated. But new issues arose following the so-called "Nixon Shocks" of 1971. In July 1971, the Japanese government was stunned by Nixon's dramatic announcement of his forthcoming visit to the People's Republic of China. Many Japanese were chagrined by the failure of the United States to consult in advance with Japan before making such a fundamental change in foreign policy, and the sudden change in America's stance made Satō's staunch adherence to non-relations with China look like he had been played for a fool. The following month, the government was again surprised to learn that, without prior consultation, Nixon was imposing a 10 percent surcharge on imports, a decision explicitly aimed at hindering Japan's exports to the United States, and was unilaterally suspending the convertibility of dollars into gold, which would eventually lead to the collapse of the Bretton Woods system of fixed currency exchange rates. The resulting decoupling of the yen and the dollar led the yen to soar in value, significantly damaging Japan's international trade and economic outlook.

These shocks of 1971 marked the beginning of a new stage in relations. The basic relationship remained close, but frictions increasingly appeared as Japan's economic growth led to economic rivalry. The political issues between the two countries were essentially security-related and derived from efforts by the United States to induce Japan to contribute more to its own defense and to regional security. The economic issues tended to stem from the ever-widening United States trade and payments deficits with Japan, which began in 1965 when Japan reversed its imbalance in trade with the United States and, for the first time, achieved an export surplus.

A second round of shocks began in 1973 when the oil producing states of OPEC introduced a worldwide oil embargo to protest Israeli policies in the Middle East, leading to a worldwide oil crisis. Japan had rapidly transitioned its economy and industry from coal to a high dependence on oil in the postwar period, and was hit hard by the first oil shock in 1973 and again by the second oil shock attending the Iranian revolution in 1979. Japan further attracted American ire by renouncing support for Israel and U.S. policy in the Middle East to secure early relief from the embargo.

The United States withdrawal from Vietnam in 1975 and the end of the Vietnam War meant that the question of Japan's role in the security of East Asia and its contributions to its own defense became central topics in the dialogue between the two countries. American dissatisfaction with Japanese defense efforts began to surface in 1975 when Secretary of Defense James R. Schlesinger publicly stigmatized Japan as an overly passive defense partner. The Japanese government, constrained by constitutional limitations and strongly pacifist public opinion, responded slowly to pressures for a more rapid buildup of its Self-Defense Forces (SDF). It steadily increased its budgetary outlays for those forces, however, and indicated its willingness to shoulder more of the cost of maintaining the United States military bases in Japan. In 1976 the United States and Japan formally established a subcommittee for defense cooperation, in the framework of a bilateral Security Consultative Committee provided for under the 1960 security treaty. This subcommittee, in turn, drew up new Guidelines for Japan–United States Defense Cooperation, under which military planners of the two countries have conducted studies relating to joint military action in the event of an armed attack on Japan.

On the economic front, Japan sought to ease trade frictions by agreeing to Orderly Marketing Arrangements, which limited exports on products whose influx into the United States was creating political problems. In 1977 an orderly marketing arrangement limiting Japanese color television exports to the United States was signed, following the pattern of an earlier disposition of the textile problem. Steel exports to the United States were also curtailed, but the problems continued as disputes flared over United States restrictions on Japanese development of nuclear fuel-reprocessing facilities, Japanese restrictions on certain agricultural imports, such as beef and oranges, and liberalization of capital investment and government procurement within Japan.

Under American pressure, Japan worked toward a comprehensive security strategy with closer cooperation with the United States but on a more reciprocal and autonomous basis. This policy was put to the test in November 1979, when radical Iranians seized the United States embassy in Tehran, taking sixty hostages. Japan reacted by condemning the action as a violation of international law. At the same time, Japanese trading firms and oil companies reportedly purchased Iranian oil that had become available when the United States banned oil imported from Iran. This action brought sharp criticism from the United States of Japanese government "insensitivity" for allowing the oil purchases and led to a Japanese apology and agreement to participate in sanctions against Iran in concert with other United States allies.

Following that incident, the Japanese government took greater care to support United States international policies designed to preserve stability and promote prosperity. Japan was prompt and effective in announcing and implementing sanctions against the Soviet Union following the Soviet invasion of Afghanistan in December 1979. In 1981, in response to United States requests, it accepted greater responsibility for defense of seas around Japan, pledged greater support for United States forces in Japan, and persisted with a steady buildup of the SDF.

==== 1980s: Reagan and Nakasone ====
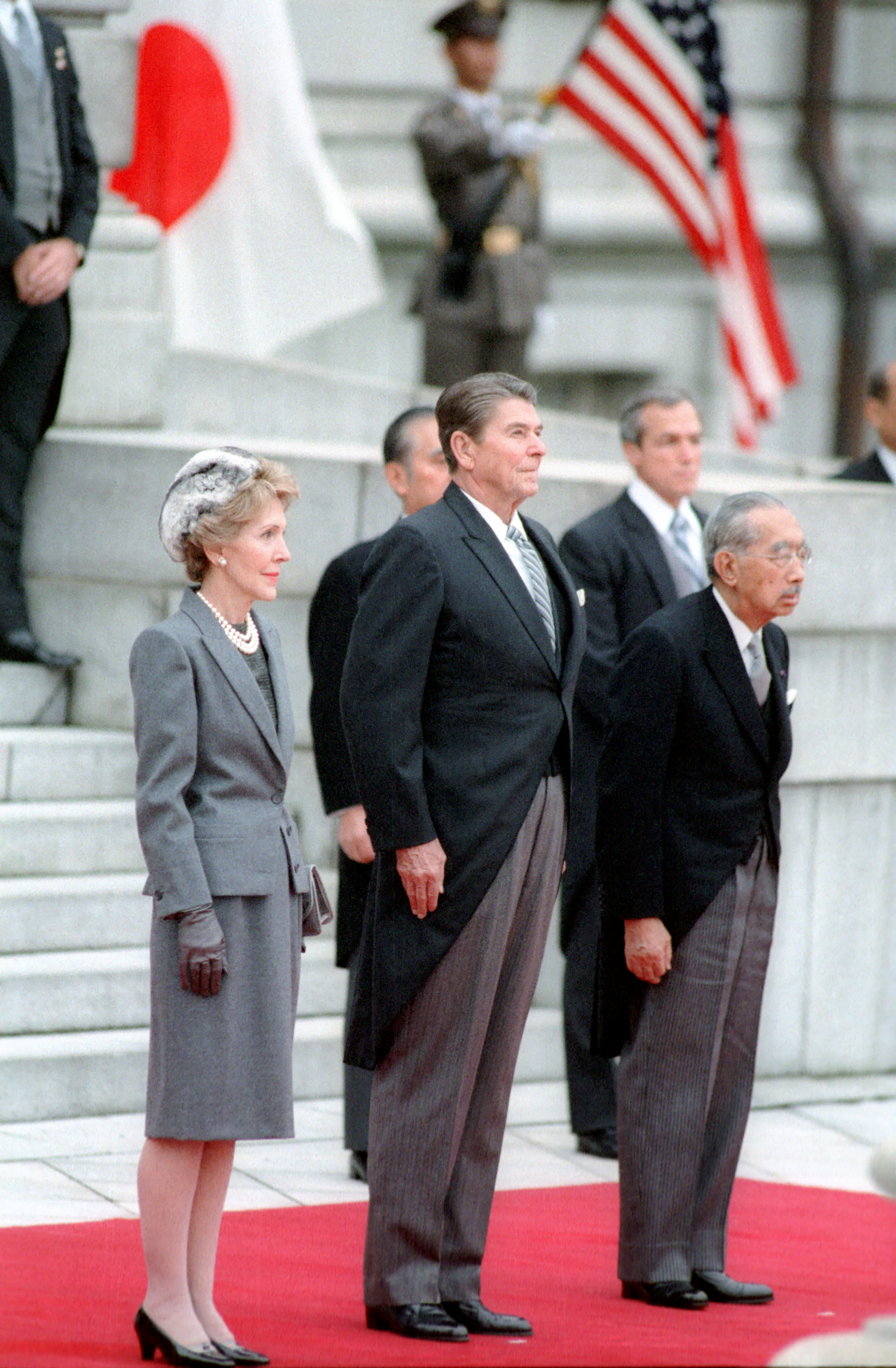
Japanese Emperor Hirohito and Ronald Reagan (1983)

Trade issues with Japan dominated relationships, especially the threat that American automotive and high tech industries would be overwhelmed. Japan's economic miracle emerged from a systematic program of subsidized investment in strategic industries—steel, machinery, electronics, chemicals, autos, shipbuilding, and aircraft. During Reagan's first term Japanese government and private investors held a third of the debt sold by the US Treasury, providing Americans with hard currency used to buy Japanese goods.

In 1981, Japanese automakers entered into the "voluntary export restraint" limiting the number of autos that they could export to the U.S. to 1.68 million per year. One side effect of this quota was that Japanese car companies opened new divisions through which they began developing luxury cars that had higher profit margins, such as with Toyota's Lexus, Honda's Acura, and Nissan's Infiniti. Another consequence was that the Japanese car makers began opening auto production plants in the U.S., with the three largest Japanese auto manufacturers all opening production facilities by 1985. These facilities were opened primarily in the southern U.S., in states which disadvantaged unions through right-to-work laws. The UAW failed in its substantial union-organizing efforts at these plants. The Big Three also began investing in and/or developing joint manufacturing facilities with several of the Japanese automakers. Ford invested in Mazda as well as setting up a joint facility with them called AutoAlliance International. Chrysler bought stock in Mitsubishi Motors and established a joint facility with them called Diamond-Star Motors. General Motors invested in Suzuki and Isuzu, and set up NUMMI, a joint manufacturing facility with Toyota.

In March 1985 the US Senate voted 92–0 in favor of a Republican resolution that condemned Japan's trade practices as "unfair" and called on President Reagan curb Japanese imports. On September 22, 1985, finance ministers from the G-5 nations (U.S., Japan, West Germany, France, and the UK) met at the Plaza Hotel in New York to reach an agreement to coordinate intervention in currency markets to depreciate the U.S. dollar and appreciate the Japanese yen and German Deutsche Mark. Japan agreed to boost domestic demand, cut taxes, and allow the yen to rise to avoid the looming threat of U.S. trade sanctions.

A qualitatively new stage of Japan–United States cooperation in world affairs appeared to be reached in late 1982 with the election of Prime Minister Yasuhiro Nakasone. Officials of the Reagan administration worked closely with their Japanese counterparts to develop a personal relationship between the two leaders based on their common security and international outlook. President Reagan and Prime Minister Nakasone enjoyed a particularly close relationship. It was Nakasone who backed Reagan to deploy Pershing II missiles in Europe at the 1983 9th G7 summit. Nakasone reassured United States leaders of Japan's determination against the Soviet threat, closely coordinated policies with the United States toward Asian trouble spots such as the Korean Peninsula and Southeast Asia, and worked cooperatively with the United States in developing China policy. The Japanese government welcomed the increase of American forces in Japan and the western Pacific, continued the steady buildup of the Japan Self-Defense Forces (SDF), and positioned Japan firmly on the side of the United States against the threat of Soviet international expansion. Japan continued to cooperate closely with United States policy in these areas following Nakasone's term of office, although the political leadership scandals in Japan in the late 1980s (i.e. the Recruit scandal) made it difficult for newly elected President George H. W. Bush to establish the same kind of close personal ties that marked the Reagan era.

A specific example of Japan's close cooperation with the United States included its quick response to the United States' call for greater host nation support from Japan following the rapid realignment of Japan–United States currencies in the mid-1980s due to the Plaza and Louvre Accords. The currency realignment resulted in a rapid rise of United States costs in Japan, which the Japanese government, upon United States request, was willing to offset. Another set of examples was provided by Japan's willingness to respond to United States requests for foreign assistance to countries considered of strategic importance to the West. During the 1980s, United States officials voiced appreciation for Japan's "strategic aid" to countries such as Pakistan, Turkey, Egypt, and Jamaica. Prime Minister Kaifu Toshiki's pledges of support for East European and Middle Eastern countries in 1990 fit the pattern of Japan's willingness to share greater responsibility for world stability. Another example of US–Japan cooperation is through energy cooperation. In 1983 a US–Japan working group, chaired by William Flynn Martin, produced the Reagan-Nakasone Joint Statement on Japan–United States Energy Cooperation. Other instances of energy relations is shown through the US–Japan Nuclear Cooperation Agreement of 1987 which was an agreement concerning the peaceful use of nuclear energy.

Testimony by William Flynn Martin, US Deputy Secretary of Energy, outlined the highlights of the nuclear agreement, including the benefits to both countries.

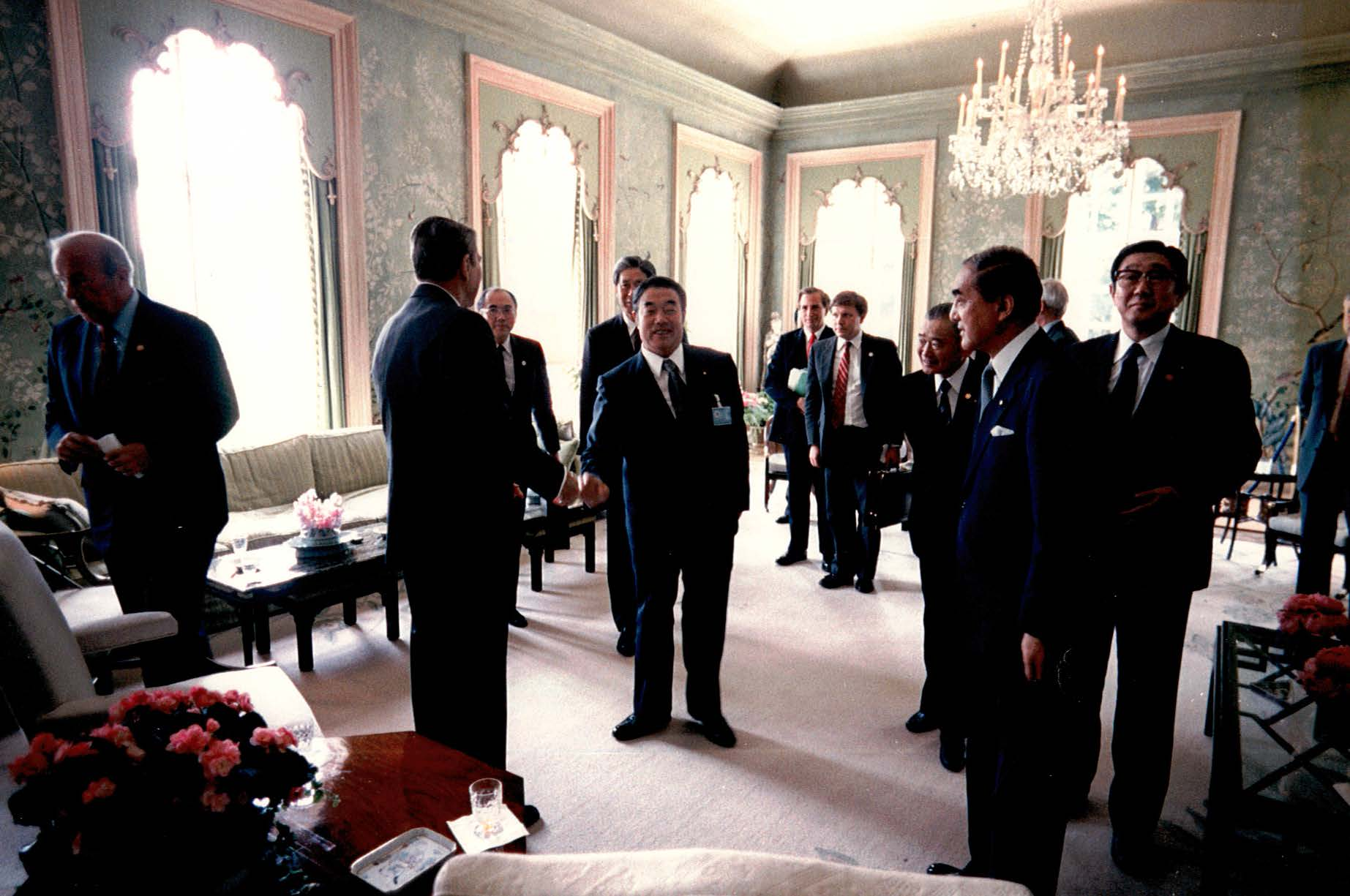
Reagan greeting leaders including Prime Minister Nakasone, Foreign Minister Abe, Finance Minister Takashita in London in 1984

Despite complaints from some Japanese businesses and diplomats, the Japanese government remained in basic agreement with United States policy toward PR China and Indochina. The government held back from large-scale aid efforts until conditions in China and Indochina were seen as more compatible with Japanese and United States interests. Of course, there also were instances of limited Japanese cooperation. Japan's response to the United States decision to help to protect tankers in the Persian Gulf during the Iran–Iraq War (1980–88) was subject to mixed reviews. Some United States officials stressed the positive, noting that Japan was unable to send military forces because of constitutional reasons but compensated by supporting the construction of a navigation system in the Persian Gulf, providing greater host nation support for United States forces in Japan, and providing loans to Oman and Jordan. Japan's refusal to join even in a mine-sweeping effort in the Persian Gulf was an indication to some United States officials of Tokyo's unwillingness to cooperate with the United States in areas of sensitivity to Japanese leaders at home or abroad.

The main area of noncooperation with the United States in the 1980s was Japanese resistance to repeated United States efforts to get Japan to open its market more to foreign goods and to change other economic practices seen as adverse to United States economic interests. A common pattern was followed. The Japanese government was sensitive to political pressures from important domestic constituencies that would be hurt by greater openness. In general, these constituencies were of two types—those representing inefficient or "declining" producers, manufacturers, and distributors, who could not compete if faced with full foreign competition; and those up-and-coming industries that the Japanese government wished to protect from foreign competition until they could compete effectively on world markets. To deal with domestic pressures while trying to avoid a break with the United States, the Japanese government engaged in protracted negotiations. This tactic bought time for declining industries to restructure themselves and new industries to grow stronger. Agreements reached dealt with some aspects of the problems, but it was common for trade or economic issues to be dragged out in talks over several years, involving more than one market-opening agreement. Such agreements were sometimes vague and subject to conflicting interpretations in Japan and the United States.

Growing interdependence was accompanied by markedly changing circumstances at home and abroad that were widely seen to have created a crisis in Japan–United States relations in the late 1980s. United States government officials continued to emphasize the positive aspects of the relationship but warned that there was a need for "a new conceptual framework". The Wall Street Journal publicized a series of lengthy reports documenting changes in the relationship in the late 1980s and reviewing the considerable debate in Japan and the United States over whether a closely cooperative relationship was possible or appropriate for the 1990s. An authoritative review of popular and media opinion, published in 1990 by the Washington-based 'Commission on US–Japan Relations for the Twenty-first Century', was concerned with preserving a close Japan–United States relationship. It warned of a "new orthodoxy" of "suspicion, criticism and considerable self-justification", which it said was endangering the fabric of Japan–United States relations. A commercially successful but critically panned 1991 book authored by US-based husband-and-wife team George Friedman and Meredith LeBard even warned of a "Coming War with Japan" caused by increased friction in trade relations.

The relative economic power of Japan and the United States was undergoing sweeping change, especially in the 1980s. This change went well beyond the implications of the United States trade deficit with Japan, which had remained between US$40 billion and US$48 billion annually since the mid-1980s. The persisting United States trade and budget deficits of the early 1980s led to a series of decisions in the middle of the decade that brought a major realignment of the value of Japanese and United States currencies. The stronger Japanese currency gave Japan the ability to purchase more United States goods and to make important investments in the United States. By the late 1980s, Japan was the main international creditor.

Japan's growing investment in the United States—it was the second largest investor after Britain—led to complaints from some American constituencies. Moreover, Japanese industry seemed well positioned to use its economic power to invest in the high-technology products in which United States manufacturers were still leaders. The United States's ability to compete under these circumstances was seen by many Japanese and Americans as hampered by heavy personal, government, and business debt and a low savings rate.

In the late 1980s, the breakup of the Soviet bloc in Eastern Europe and the growing preoccupation of Soviet leaders with massive internal political and economic difficulties forced the Japanese and United States governments to reassess their longstanding alliance against the Soviet threat. Officials of both nations had tended to characterize the security alliance as the linchpin of the relationship, which should have priority over economic and other disputes. Some Japanese and United States officials and commentators continued to emphasize the common dangers to Japan–United States interests posed by the continued strong Soviet military presence in Asia. They stressed that until Moscow followed its moderation in Europe with major demobilization and reductions in its forces positioned against the United States and Japan in the Pacific, Washington and Tokyo needed to remain militarily prepared and vigilant.

Increasingly, however, other perceived benefits of close Japan–United States security ties were emphasized. The alliance was seen as deterring other potentially disruptive forces in East Asia, notably North Korea. Some United States officials noted that the alliance helped keep Japan's potential military power in check and under the supervision of the United States.

==== 1990s: Bush Sr. and Clinton years ====
Following the collapse of Japan's bubble economy in 1989, relations with Washington began to improve, as fears faded that Japan was surpassing America economically. In terms of security issues and basic political solidarity, agreement was high. The only frictions arose from trade issues.

In its first months, the new administration of incoming President George H. W. Bush negotiated with Japan to collaborate on a project that would produce a Japanese-made jet fighter, the Mitsubishi F-2, based on the American F-16 Fighting Falcon. While supporters viewed the joint project as allowing the US access to Japanese technology and preventing Japan from constructing its own military aircraft, the agreement attracted bipartisan criticism from members of Congress who believed the deal would give away American technology to Japan and allow the country to form a major aeronautics industry that might compete with that of the United States. Nevertheless, the Bush administration pushed the deal through, assessing the aircraft as providing an improvement in the mutual defense of both America and Japan.

On March 12, 1990, Bush met with former Prime Minister of Japan Noboru Takeshita for an hour to discuss shared economic issues and "the fact that their solution will require extraordinary efforts on both sides of the Pacific." On April 28, Bush announced Japan was being removed from the list of countries the US was targeting with reprisal tariffs for what was considered unfair trading practices on the part of Japan. The decision was made on the recommendation of U.S. Trade Representative Carla A. Hills and was hailed by Japanese officials. The move also came at a time when the US had a $50 billion trade deficit with Japan, and congressional critics lambasted the move as premature.

In January 1991, Bush launched the Gulf War to roll back Iraq's invasion of Kuwait. Japan was unable to send troops due to Article 9 of its constitution, but made a show of support for U.S. policy by contributing $9 billion in 1991 dollars to help fund the war.

In April 1991, Bush met with Prime Minister Toshiki Kaifu, Bush stating afterward that the pair were "committed to see that that bashing doesn't go forward and that this relationship goes on." Bush pressed U.S. demands for access to Japan's highly protected rice market and Kaifu countered by explaining the numerous objections being raised by both consumers and producers in Japan. In November, during an address in New York City, Bush stated that bashing Japan had become a regularity in parts of the US and had served to strain relations. Two days later, Chief Cabinet Secretary Koichi Katō said that Japan had mixed feelings toward the US and that Japan was appreciative of American efforts to reduce the U.S. budget deficit. On December 7, the fiftieth anniversary of the attack on Pearl Harbor, Bush accepted an apology from Japan over the event issued by Prime Minister Kiichi Miyazawa the previous day and urged progress be made in improving relations between the US and Japan.

Bush visited Japan in January 1992 as part of a 12-day trade-oriented trip to Asia. On January 8, 1992, Bush played a doubles tennis match with U.S. ambassador to Japan Michael Armacost against Emperor of Japan Akihito and his son, Crown Prince Naruhito. The emperor and crown prince won. That same evening, at banquet hosted by Prime Minister Kiichi, Bush fainted and vomited into the Prime Minister's lap. A news video of the vomiting incident was played over and over on American television, and together with the humiliating defeat to the Emperor and Crown Prince in the tennis match, came to be viewed as a metaphor for American weakness in the face of Japanese strength.

During the Clinton years, relations transitioned to a new stage, as Washington and Tokyo came together around shared interests in the face of a rapidly rising China. The nuclear threat posed by North Korea was also a concern. Clinton's policy was multilateral pressure on Pyongyang while arming South Korea and Japan. Nevertheless, trade tensions lingered and despite the collapse of Japan's bubble economy and the onset of the "Lost Decades" in Japan, "Japan bashing" was slow to die out in the United States.

Progress on trade issues was hampered by the rapid turnover in Japanese prime ministers—there were five in Clinton's first four years. Clinton engaged in some casual "Japan bashing" of his own shortly after assuming the office, when he was caught on a hot microphone telling Russian president Boris Yeltsin that when Japanese say yes, they actually mean no, provoking a firestorm in the Japanese press. Prime Minister Miyazawa Kiichi, however, laughed off the remark, mentioned the song "Yes, We Have No Bananas," and noting that, "every language has its peculiarity." Miyazawa was in no position to object since he had a record of making similar gaffes himself, such as his earlier suggesting that America's economic difficulties were due to Americans lacking a strong work ethic. When Miyazawa and Clinton met in April 1993, Japan was still running a massive trade surplus with the U.S., extending to $59 billion by the end of the year. Miyazawa admitted that this was "embarrassing" and argued that his government's stimulus plans would deliver a much-needed boost to domestic demand, which would hopefully lead to a reduction in Japan's trade surplus. This fell far short of Clinton's desire for "temporary quantitative indicators," but Miyazawa categorically rejected anything that would smell like an import quota. Instead, a "framework" approach was taken whereby trade negotiations were delegated to specialists and confined to specific sectors, including automobiles, computer parts, and agricultural goods. This approach proved unworkable from the beginning and confusion reigned between Japanese and American officials over which "sectors" exactly were covered by the "framework" approach.

Clinton had even less luck with Miyazawa's successor Morihiro Hosokawa with whom he met twice, in September 1993 and February 1994. After making little headway in their first meeting, negotiations completely collapsed in the second meeting as Hosokawa firmly rejected U.S. demands for a unilateral slashing of Japanese auto exports, arguing that as the head of a fragile coalition government, he simply did not have the political capital to accept the hard numerical targets the U.S. was seeking. Although both sides were at pains to stress that bilateral relations were too important to be damaged by this one diplomatic failure, an atmosphere of tension and disappointment was palpable.

Clinton fared better with the fifth Japanese prime minister to hold office during his time as U.S. president, Ryutaro Hashimoto. The two leaders held a cordial meeting in Tokyo in the spring of 1996, agreeing to stand firm together against the threat from North Korea. The waning of Japan's economic might made U.S.-Japan trade discussions less contentious, and Clinton also agreed to return one of the controversial military bases on Okinawa. However, during Murayama's tenure, Relations between the two countries would further be strained by the 1995 Okinawa rape incident which triggered a significant increase in anti base sentiment across Japan, and swiftly lead to both governments working together to come up with an amicable solution to the political fallout, with Murayama organizing an examination of the Status of forces agreement, with Clinton stating two days later that he was willing to revise implementing procedures of the Agreement.

==== 21st century: Stronger alliance in the context of a rising China ====
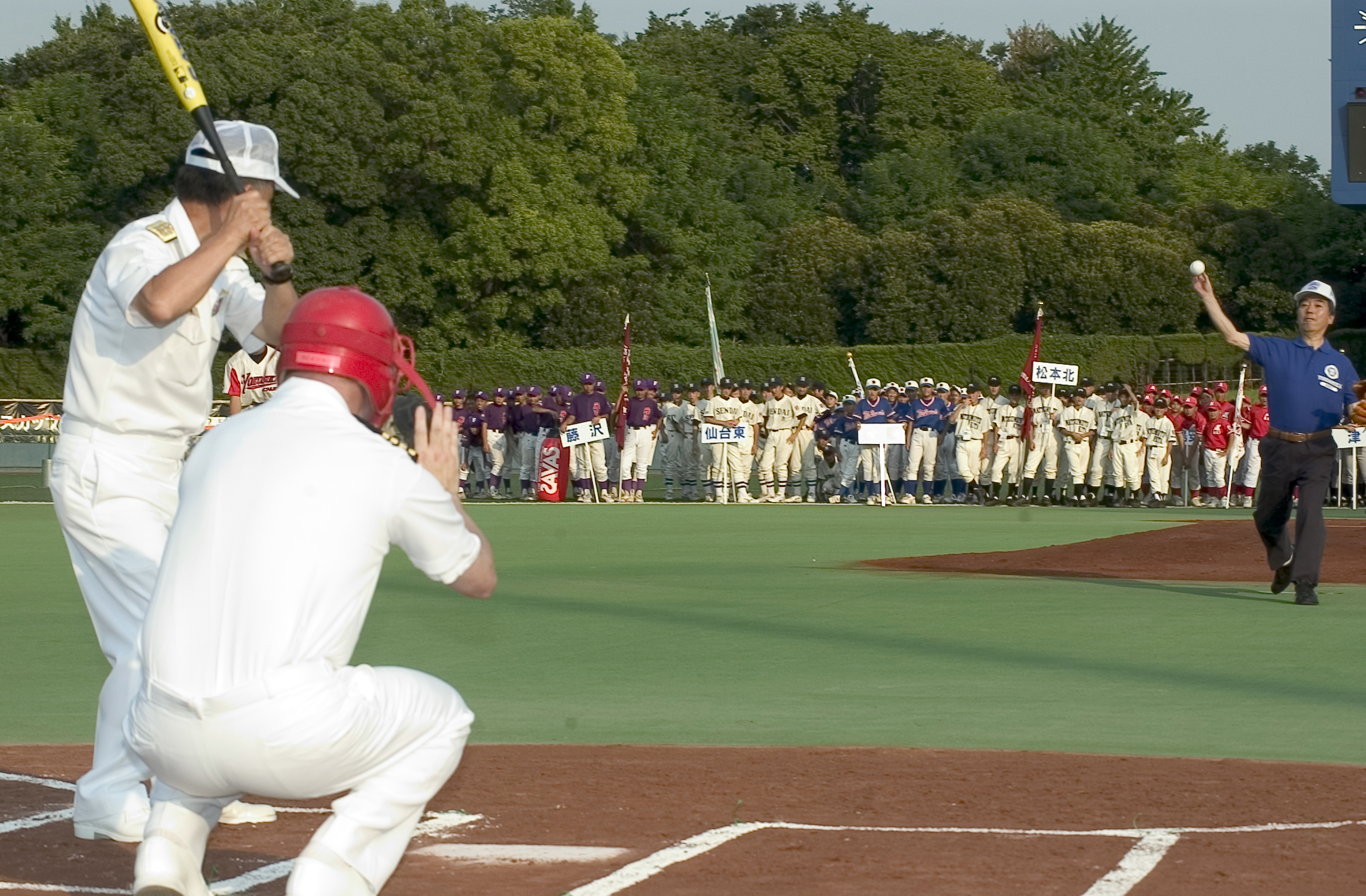
A Japanese mayor throws a pitch to a U.S. Navy captain. Japan and the U.S. share many cultural links, including a love for baseball imported from the US.

By the late 1990s and beyond, the US–Japan relationship had been improved and strengthened. The major cause of friction in the relationship, e.g. trade disputes, became less problematic as China displaced Japan as the greatest perceived economic threat to the U.S. and the emergence of North Korea as a belligerent rogue state brought the two nations closer together in the face of what was perceived to be a common enemy. In the face of these new threats, the two nations focused on increasing military and defensive cooperation, while also adopting a new rhetoric for the alliance—that of "shared values."

While the foreign policy of the administration of President George W. Bush put a strain on some of the United States' international relations, the alliance with Japan became stronger, as evidenced in the deployment of Japanese troops to Iraq, Japanese provision of logistical support in Bush's "war on terror", and the joint development of anti-missile defense systems. The new strength of the relationship was underscored by extensive media coverage of the "close friendship" between Bush and Japanese prime minister Junichirō Koizumi, as exemplified by Bush taking Koizumi to visit the former home of Koizumi's personal hero, Elvis Presley, during their "farewell" meeting in 2006. As part of his official remarks on the White House lawn, Bush told Koizumi, "Decades ago our two fathers looked across the Pacific and saw adversaries, uncertainty and war. Today their sons look across that same ocean and see friends and opportunity and peace."

In 2009, the Democratic Party of Japan came into power with a mandate calling for changes in U.S.-Japan security arrangements. The new government launched a review of the recently concluded security realignment plan, but United States Defense Secretary Robert Gates said that the U.S. Congress was unwilling to consider any changes. Some U.S. officials worried that the government led by the Democratic Party of Japan might chart a policy shift away from the United States and toward a more independent foreign policy. However, in the 2012 Japanese general election, the conservative Liberal Democratic Party swept back into power, ensuring that relations with the United States would return to their prior, more stable footing.

In 2015, during remarks welcoming Japanese prime minister Shinzo Abe to the White House, President Barack Obama thanked Japan for its cultural contributions to the United States by saying: "This visit is a celebration of the ties of friendship and family that bind our peoples. I first felt it when I was 6 years old when my mother took me to Japan. I felt it growing up in Hawaii, like communities across our country, home to so many proud Japanese Americans," and "Today is also a chance for Americans, especially our young people, to say thank you for all the things we love from Japan. Like karate and karaoke. Manga and anime. And, of course, emojis."

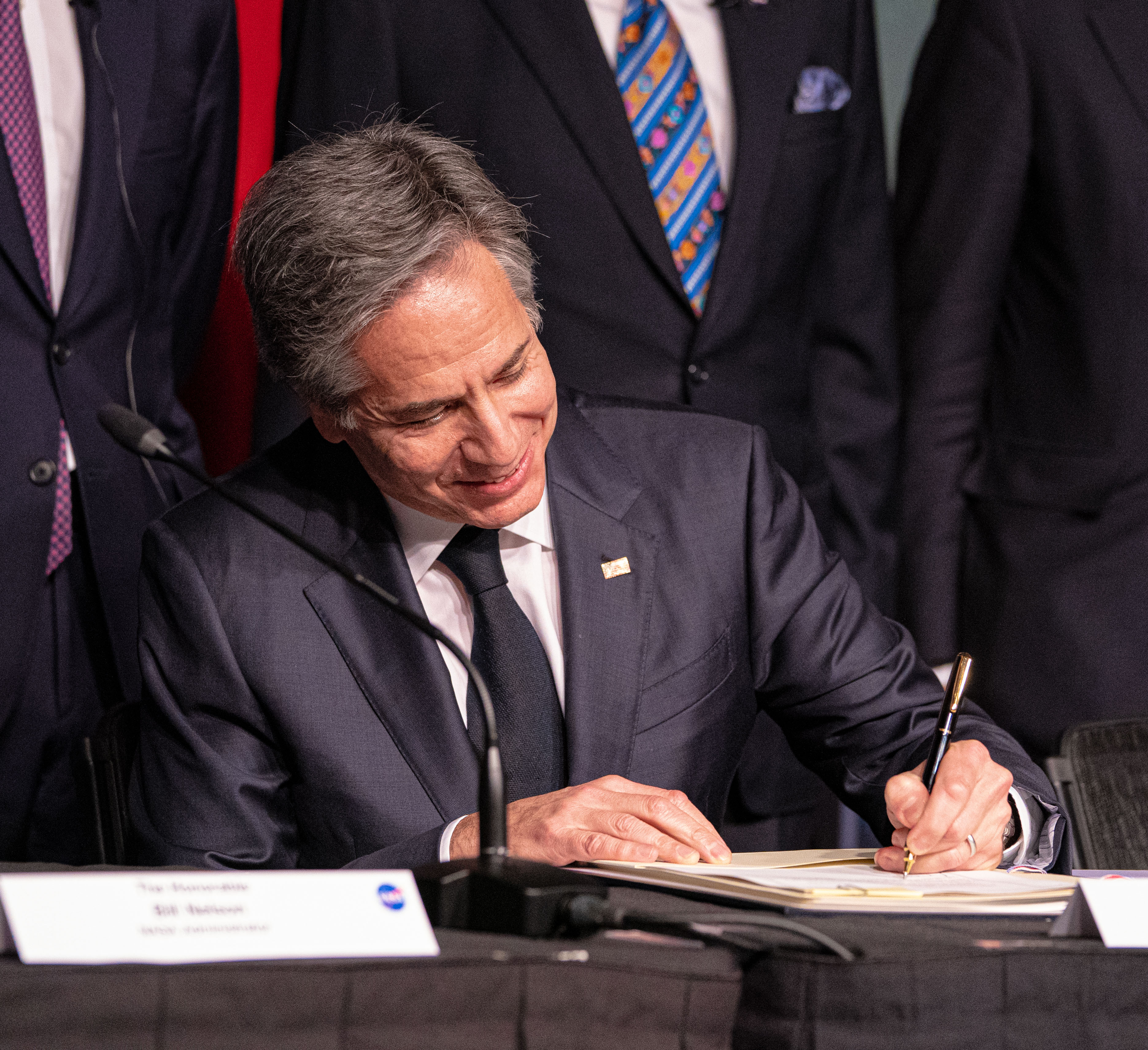
US secretary of state Antony Blinken signs a U.S.-Japan Space Cooperation Framework Agreement in 2023.

In 2016, U.S. presidential candidate Donald Trump partially revived old "Japan bashing" rhetoric from the 1980s by complaining about Japan engaging in "unfair" trade practices, rhetoric that many commentators viewed as "outdated" and "anachronistic." As president, Trump withdrew the United States from the Trans Pacific Partnership, which many viewed as a blow to Japan. Later in 2018, Trump imposed metal tariffs on Japan, while other allies such as the EU, Canada, Australia, South Korea etc. were all exempt, signaling a deterioration in ties between the U.S. and Japan. Along with harsh criticism of Japanese trade practices, accusations of Japanese "cheating," and suggestions that Japan was an economic threat and rival, similar to the 1980s and 90s, Trump also started to question the U.S.-Japan Security Alliance, deeming it one-sided toward Japan. Trump also repeatedly expressed his hopes of convincing Japan to dramatically increase its annual payments subsidizing U.S. military bases in Japan. However, despite the inflammatory rhetoric, Japanese prime minister Shinzō Abe managed to build a cordial relationship with Trump, and succeeded in negotiating a bilateral trade deal in 2019 that lowered tariffs between the two nations. However, the deal was said to be more advantageous to the U.S., as tariffs on Japanese automobiles remained in place (automobiles were the largest Japanese export to the U.S.), and some Japanese media referred to the agreement as an "unequal treaty". Furthermore, the metal tariffs on Japan were not removed, and continued to exist into late 2021.

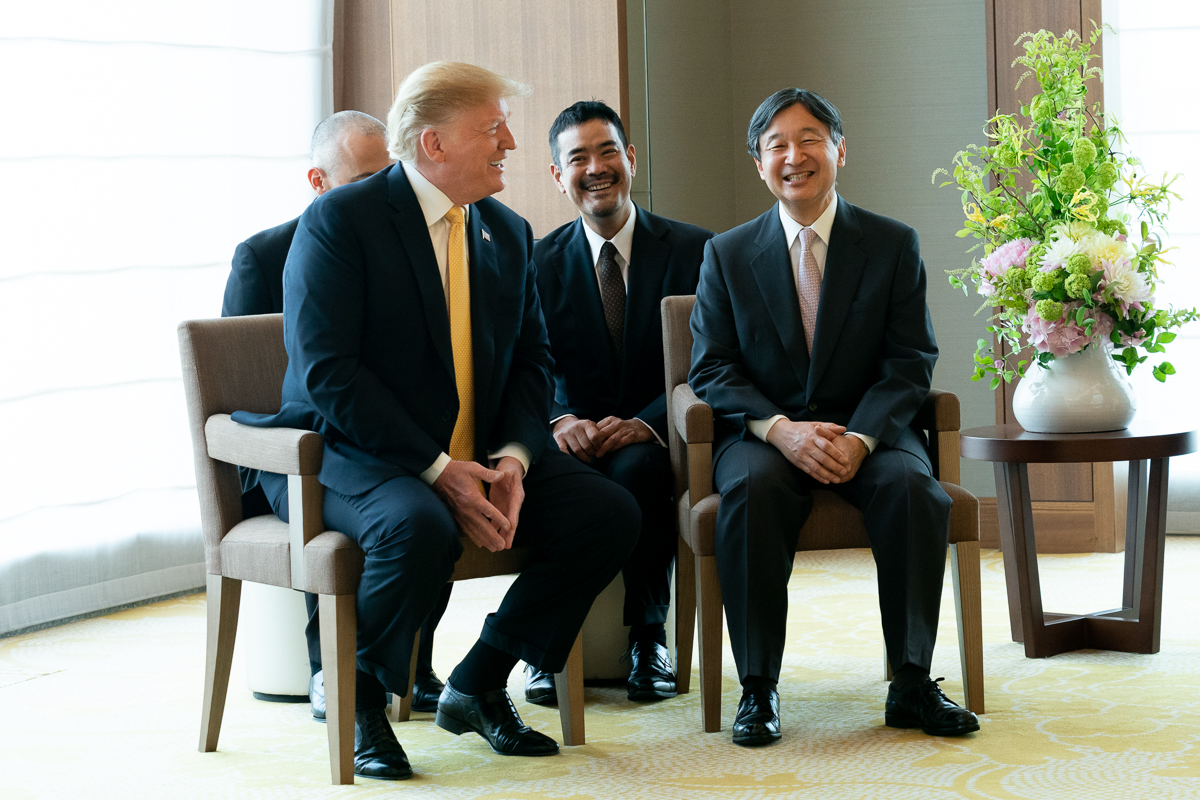
U.S. president Donald Trump and Emperor Naruhito in the Palace Hotel, Tokyo in May 2019.

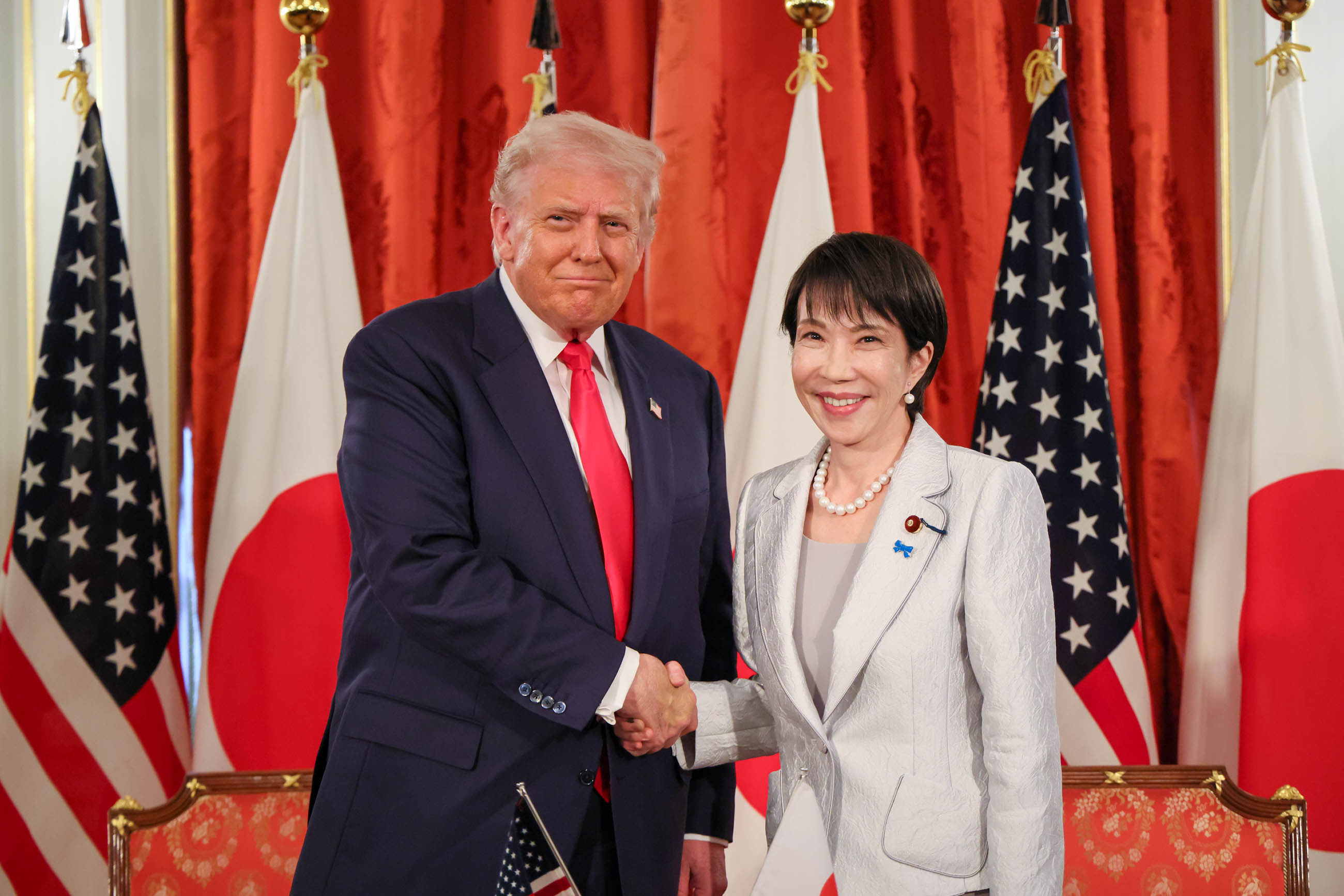
U.S. president Trump and Prime Minister Sanae Takaichi during their bilateral meeting at the Akasaka Palace, Tokyo in October 2025.

After the White House meeting between Prime Minister Suga and President Joe Biden in April 2021, the leader level joint statement mentioned Taiwan for the first time in fifty years, stating that stability there was important for the region and that cross-strait issues should be resolved peacefully.

In February 2025, Prime Minister Shigeru Ishiba and President Donald Trump pledged to inaugurate a "new golden age" of relations in a meeting at the White House. The second presidency of Trump saw a deterioration of relations between Japan and the United States. Under Secretary of Defense for Policy Elbridge Colby pushed for Japan to increase its military spending to 3.5% of its GDP, which led Japan to cancel a meeting between U.S. secretary of state Marco Rubio and U.S. Defense Secretary Pete Hegseth and Japanese Defense Minister Gen Nakatani and Foreign Minister Takeshi Iwaya in Washington, D.C. Trump also announced significant tariff rates against Japan, calling the country "spoiled". In response, Ishiba stated that Japan needs "to make more efforts to become less dependent on the US".

After the 2025 Japanese House of Councillors election, Ishiba announced his resignation. Sanae Takaichi became prime minister on October 21, who Trump would meet with a few days later as part of his visit to Asia. During their meeting, the two leaders signed agreements on trade, minerals, nuclear technology and rare earths. Takaichi also expressed her intent to strengthen the US–Japan alliance. After their meeting, Takaichi gave Trump a putter formerly owned by former prime minister Shinzo Abe, a golf ball signed by Japanese professional golfer Hideki Matsuyama, and a gold-leaf golf ball. During their visit at the US Yokosuka Naval Base, aboard the USS George Washington (CVN-73), Takaichi vowed to bring the US–Japan alliance into a "golden age", amid a "severe security environment". According to Trump's press secretary, she also told Trump privately she would recommend him for the Nobel Peace Prize.

During the 2025 China–Japan diplomatic crisis, Trump and high-ranking US government officials did not offer public support for Takaichi in relation to the spat, while lower-level officials including US ambassador to Japan George Edward Glass spoke out on her behalf. In December 2025, a U.S. State Department spokesperson officially criticized China for radar targeting Japanese aircraft. The same month, Japan and the U.S. undertook joint bomber drills involving an American B-52 and Japanese F-35s over the Sea of Japan.

Over the course of 2026, the Japan Ministry of Foreign Affairs has petitioned the Trump administration several times to stop posting memes promoting ICE raids and the Iran war featuring intellectual property, including Mario, Pokémon, Wii Sports, and Naruto, which are franchises of Japanese origin.

In July and August 2026, Japan and the United States launched a joint currency intervention to strengthen the Japanese yen after a period of steady decline in its value. During a Trump cabinet meeting at Camp David on July 31, 2026, a Reuters photographer published an image of a note from Scott Bessent, Secretary of the U.S. Treasury Department that stated: "Purchase $5-10 billion in Japanese yen." Currently, both Japan and the United States have confirmed that they have implemented measures to devalue the yen. Although the intervention resulted in short-term strengthening of the yen, it was not effective at curbing the currency's long-term decline. In September 2026, the United States and Japan reaffirmed their security cooperation amid preparations for the Trump–Xi summit. U.S., Japanese and South Korean officials met during the United Nations General Assembly and discussed regional security, economic coercion, supply chains and stability in the Taiwan Strait.

== Economic relations ==
=== Trade volume ===
U.S. trade deficit (in billions, goods only) by country in 2014

As of the late 1980s, the United States was Japan's largest economic partner, taking 33.8 percent of its exports, supplying 22.4 percent of its imports, and accounting for 38.6 percent of its direct investment abroad in 1988. As of 2013, the United States takes up 18% of Japanese exports, and supplies 8.5% of its imports (the slack having been picked up by China, which now provides 22%).

Japan's imports from the United States include both raw materials and manufactured goods. American agricultural products were a leading import in 1988 (US$9.1 billion as measured by United States export statistics), made up of meat (US$1.4 billion), fish (US$1.6 billion), grains (US$2.3 billion), and soybeans (US$1.0 billion). Imports of manufactured goods were mainly in the category of machinery and transportation equipment, rather than consumer goods. In 1988 Japan imported US$6.9 billion of machinery from the United States, of which computers and computer parts (US$2.4 billion) formed the largest single component. In the category of transportation equipment, Japan imported US$2.2 billion of aircraft and parts (automobiles and parts accounted for only US$500 million).

Japan's exports to the United States are almost entirely manufactured goods. Automobiles were by far the largest single category, amounting to US$21 billion in 1988, or 23% of total Japanese exports to the United States. Automotive parts accounted for another US$5 billion. Other major items were office machinery (including computers), which totaled US$10.6 billion in 1988, telecommunications equipment (US$10.4 billion) and power-generating machinery (US$3.3 billion).

From the mid-1960s until at least the late 1980s, the trade balance was in Japan's favor. According to Japanese data, its surplus with the United States grew from US$380 million in 1970 to nearly US$48 billion in 1988. United States data on the trade relationship (which differ slightly because each nation includes transportation costs on the import side but not the export side) also showed a rapid deterioration of the imbalance in the 1980s, from a Japanese surplus of US$10 billion in 1980 to one of US$60 billion in 1987.

=== Trade frictions ===
Notable outpourings of United States congressional and media rhetoric critical of Japan accompanied the disclosure in 1987 that the company Toshiba had illegally sold sophisticated machinery of United States origin to the Soviet Union, which reportedly allowed Moscow to make submarines quiet enough to avoid detection, and the United States congressional debate in 1989 over the Japan–United States agreement to develop a new fighter aircraft—the FSX—for the Japan Air Self-Defense Force. The United States government halted the purchase of Toshiba products for three years in retaliation.

=== Direct investment ===
As elsewhere, Japan's direct investment in the United States expanded rapidly and is an important new dimension in the countries' relationship. The total value of cumulative investments of this kind was US$8.7 billion in 1980. By 1988, it had grown to US$71.9 billion.

The figure in 2018 had reached $500 billion. United States data identified Japan as the second largest investor in the United States; it had about half the value of investments of Britain, but more than those of the Netherlands, Canada, or West Germany. Much of Japan's investment in the United States in the late 1980s was in the commercial sector, providing the basis for distribution and sale of Japanese exports to the United States. Wholesale and retail distribution accounted for 35% of all Japanese investments in the United States in 1988, while manufacturing accounted for 23%. Real estate became a popular investment during the 1980s, with cumulative investments rising to US$10 billion by 1988, or 20% of total direct investment in the United States.

On July 22, 2025, President Donald Trump announced on that Japan will make investment into the United States worth US$550 billion. Japan's goods exported to the United States would be subject to a 15% tariff upon entry, instead of 25%.

In February 2026, the Trump administration imposed 15% reciprocal tariffs on a wide range of Japanese goods. However, the U.S. court ruled that the IEEPA does not grant the president the authority to impose such tariffs. Following that, the Trump administration announced that it would impose additional 10% tariffs on its trading partners to replace the reciprocal tariffs.

=== Energy ===
The US and Japan find themselves in fundamentally different situations regarding energy and energy security. Cooperation in energy has moved from conflict (the embargo of Japanese oil was the trigger that launched the Pearl Harbor attack) to cooperation with two significant agreements being signed during the 1980s: the Reagan-Nakasone Energy Cooperation Agreement and the US–Japan Nuclear Cooperation Agreement of 1987 (allowing the Japanese to reprocess nuclear fuels).

Further cooperation occurred during the 2011 Tōhoku earthquake and tsunami with US troops aiding the victims of the disaster zone and US scientists from the Nuclear Regulatory Commission and Department of Energy advising on the response to the nuclear incident at Fukushima. In 2013 the Department of Energy allowed the export of American natural gas to Japan.

After 2021 the new Biden administration emphasized cooperation, especially regarding digital and energy infrastructure.

== Military relations ==
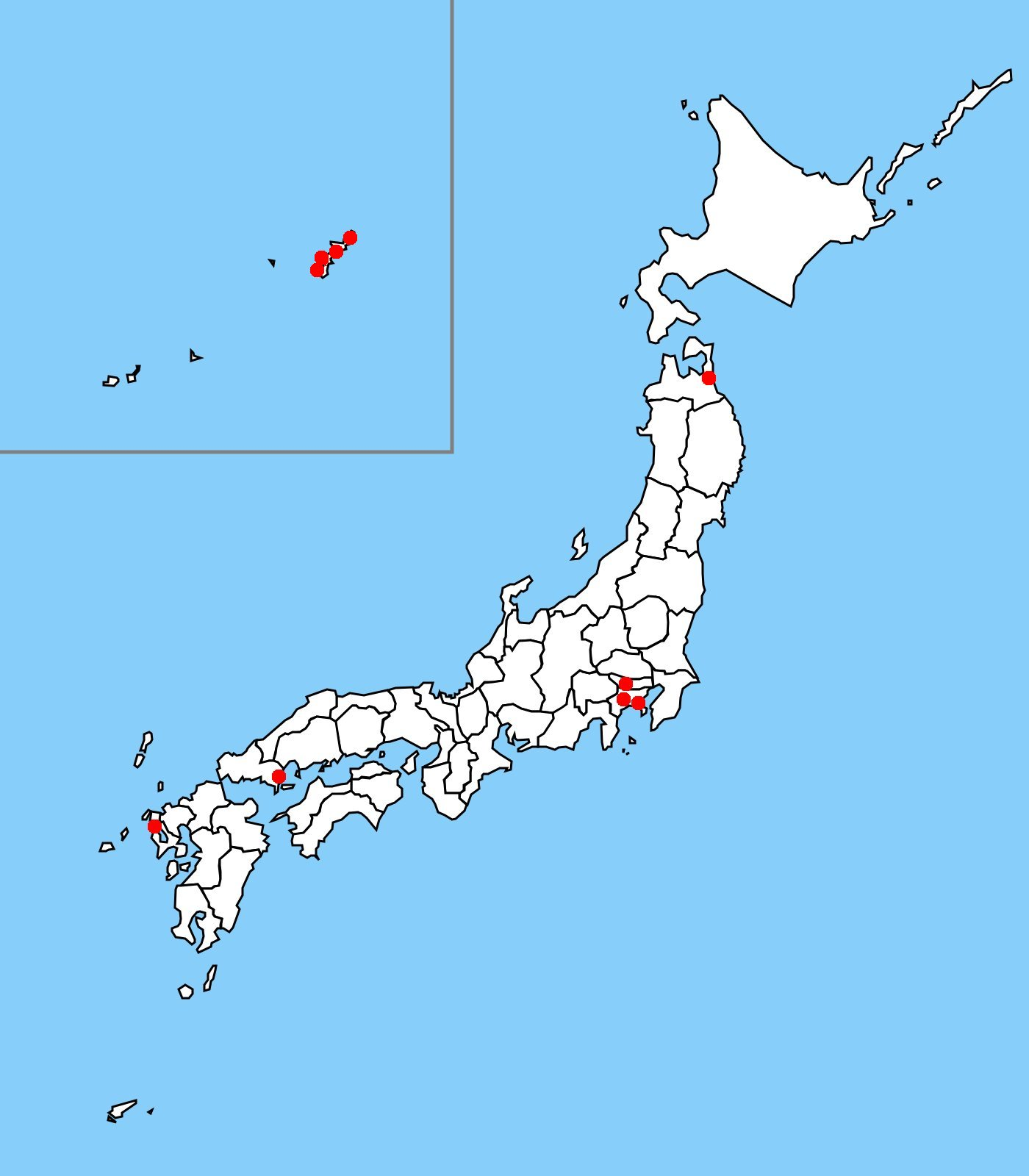
Major US military bases in Japan

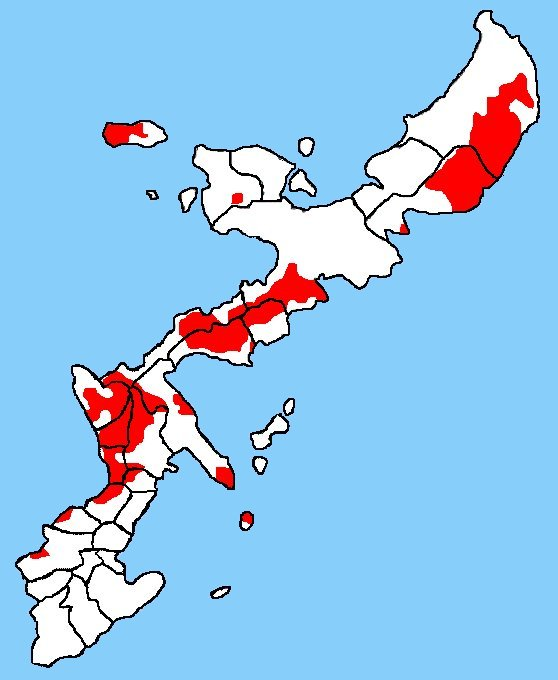
US military bases in Okinawa

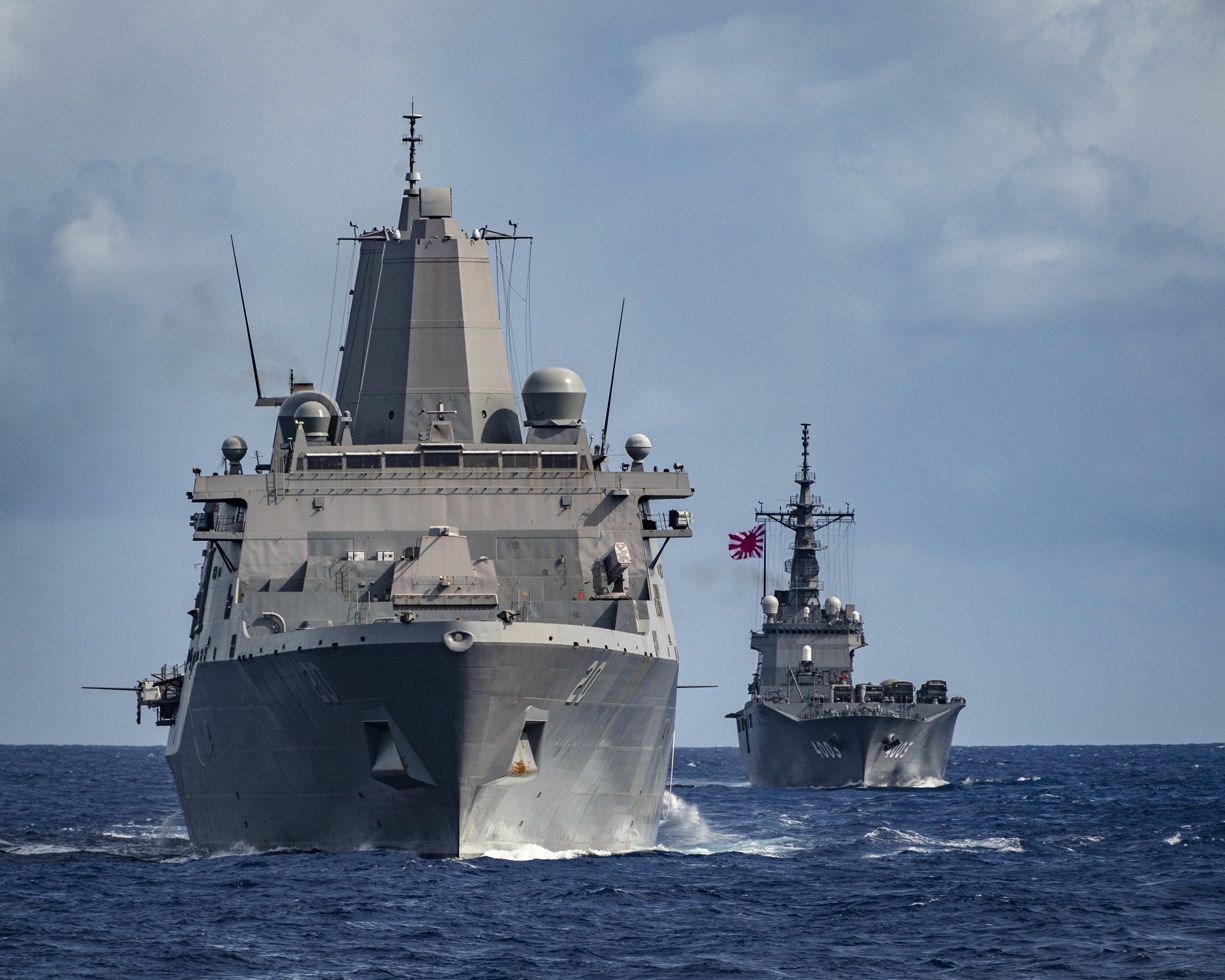
Japanese Maritime Self-Defense Force ship JS Kunisaki (right) participates in a training exercise with USS Green Bay (LPD-20) (left) in 2019.

US government officials generally consider Japan to be one of its closest allies and partners. The 1952 Security Treaty provided the initial basis for the nation's security relations with the United States. The pact was replaced in 1960 by the Treaty of Mutual Cooperation and Security. The Agreed Minutes to the treaty specified that the Japanese government must be consulted prior to major changes in United States force deployment in Japan or to the use of Japanese bases for combat operations other than in defense of Japan itself. However, Japan was relieved by its constitutional prohibition of participating in external military operations from any obligation to defend the United States if it were attacked outside of Japanese territories. In 1990 the Japanese government expressed its intention to continue to rely on the treaty's arrangements to guarantee national security.

The Agreed Minutes under Article 6 of the 1960 treaty contain a status-of-forces agreement on the stationing of United States forces in Japan, with specifics on the provision of facilities and areas for their use and on the administration of Japanese citizens employed in the facilities. Also covered are the limits of the two countries' jurisdictions over crimes committed in Japan by United States military personnel.

The Mutual Security Assistance Pact of 1952 initially involved a military aid program that provided for Japan's acquisition of funds, matériel, and services for the nation's essential defense. Although Japan no longer received any aid from the United States by the 1960s, the agreement continued to serve as the basis for purchase and licensing agreements ensuring interoperability of the two nations' weapons and for the release of classified data to Japan, including both international intelligence reports and classified technical information.

As of 2014 the United States had 50,000 troops in Japan, the headquarters of the US 7th Fleet and more than 10,000 Marines. In May 2014 it was revealed the United States was deploying two unarmed Global Hawk long-distance surveillance drones to Japan with the expectation they would engage in surveillance missions over China and North Korea. At the beginning of October 2018 the new Japanese Mobile Amphibious Forces held joint exercises with the US marines in the Japanese prefecture of Kagoshima, the purpose of which was to work out the actions in defense of remote territories.

During the US-Japan Security Consultative Committee meeting in Tokyo on July 28, 2024, Japan's defense leaders agreed to support the United States through co-production of US-designed Advanced Medium-Range Air-to-Air Missiles (AMRAAM) and Patriot Advanced Capability-3 (PAC-3) missiles.

On October 23, 2025, U.S. Defense Secretary Pete Hegseth welcomed Japan's plan to increase defense spending to 2% of its GDP to expand military capabilities for deterring regional threats by China. In January 2026, Japan and the U.S. agreed to expand joint military training across the first island chain.

=== Ryukyu Islands (Okinawa) ===
Okinawa is the site of major American military bases that have caused problems, as Japanese and Okinawans have protested their presence for decades. In secret negotiations that began in 1969 Washington sought unrestricted use of its bases for possible conventional combat operations in Korea, Taiwan, and South Vietnam, as well as the emergency re-entry and transit rights of nuclear weapons. However anti-nuclear sentiment was strong in Japan and the government wanted the U.S. to remove all nuclear weapons from Okinawa. In the end, the United States and Japan agreed to maintain bases that would allow the continuation of American deterrent capabilities in East Asia. In 1972 the Ryukyu Islands, including Okinawa, reverted to Japanese control and the provisions of the 1960 security treaty were extended to cover them. The United States retained the right to station forces on these islands.

Military relations improved after the mid-1970s. In 1960 the Security Consultative Committee, with representatives from both countries, was set up under the 1960 security treaty to discuss and coordinate security matters concerning both nations. In 1976 a subcommittee of that body prepared the Guidelines for Japan–United States Defense Cooperation that were approved by the full committee in 1978 and later approved by the National Defense Council and cabinet. The guidelines authorized unprecedented activities in joint defense planning, response to an armed attack on Japan, and cooperation on situations in Asia and the Pacific region that could affect Japan's security.

A dispute that had boiled since 1996 regarding a base with 18,000 U.S. Marines had temporarily been resolved in late 2013. Agreement had been reached to move the Marine Corps Air Station Futenma to a less-densely populated area of Okinawa.

In October 2024, Gen Nakatani conducted his first talks with U.S. Defense Secretary Lloyd Austin, agreeing to enhance their military presence in the Ryukyu Islands. In July 2024, defense chiefs and diplomats from both nations agreed on significant upgrades to their alliance, including a revamp of U.S. command in Japan, which would grant it a direct leadership role over American forces. Additionally, Japan's Self-Defense Forces planned to establish a new permanent joint headquarters by March 2025. This collaboration aimed to counter China's growing assertiveness, especially regarding Taiwan, which Tarō Asō controversially referred to as an important "country" for Japan. This statement underscored Japan's cautious approach to Taiwan amid its complex relationship with China, which views the island as a breakaway province. The potential for conflict over Taiwan could implicate Japan due to its alliance with the U.S. and geographic proximity, leading Japan to focus its defense budget on addressing these threats.

In October 2026, Japanese Prime Minister Sanae Takaichi filed a formal protest with the United States following the arrest of a U.S. Marine stationed in Okinawa on suspicion of murdering a Japanese woman. The Marine Corps offered condolences and confirmed its cooperation with Japanese authorities. The incident reignited long-standing tensions surrounding the presence of U.S. military personnel in Okinawa, where the majority of the 18,000 Japan-based Marines are deployed, and threatened to complicate plans for relocating troops from Futenma to Henoko.

=== National intelligence ===
Japan's limited intelligence gathering capability and personnel are focused on China and North Korea, as the nation primarily relies on the American National Security Agency.

== Cultural relations ==
=== World Fairs ===
The world fairs exchanges throughout the 1870s to 1890s served as a cultural exchange between Japan and the United States. At the 1876 Centennial Exposition in Philadelphia, the Japanese Meiji government participated by creating an exhibit displaying various aspects of Japanese culture. Japanese Arts, porcelains, silk textiles and high quality artifacts were displayed at the Chicago World Fair. For many Americans, this is their first exposure to Japanese culture showing the exchanging of cultural knowledge within the late nineteenth century. This era of world fairs was marked with a wave of positive US-Japan relations as public perception in the United States viewed Japan favorably. While Japan viewed America's wave of positivity as a way of improving their bilateral relations and progress towards undoing the Unequal Treaties of the 1850s - 1860s and proving Japan's capability as equals to the Western Powers in the world stage.

=== Sports ===
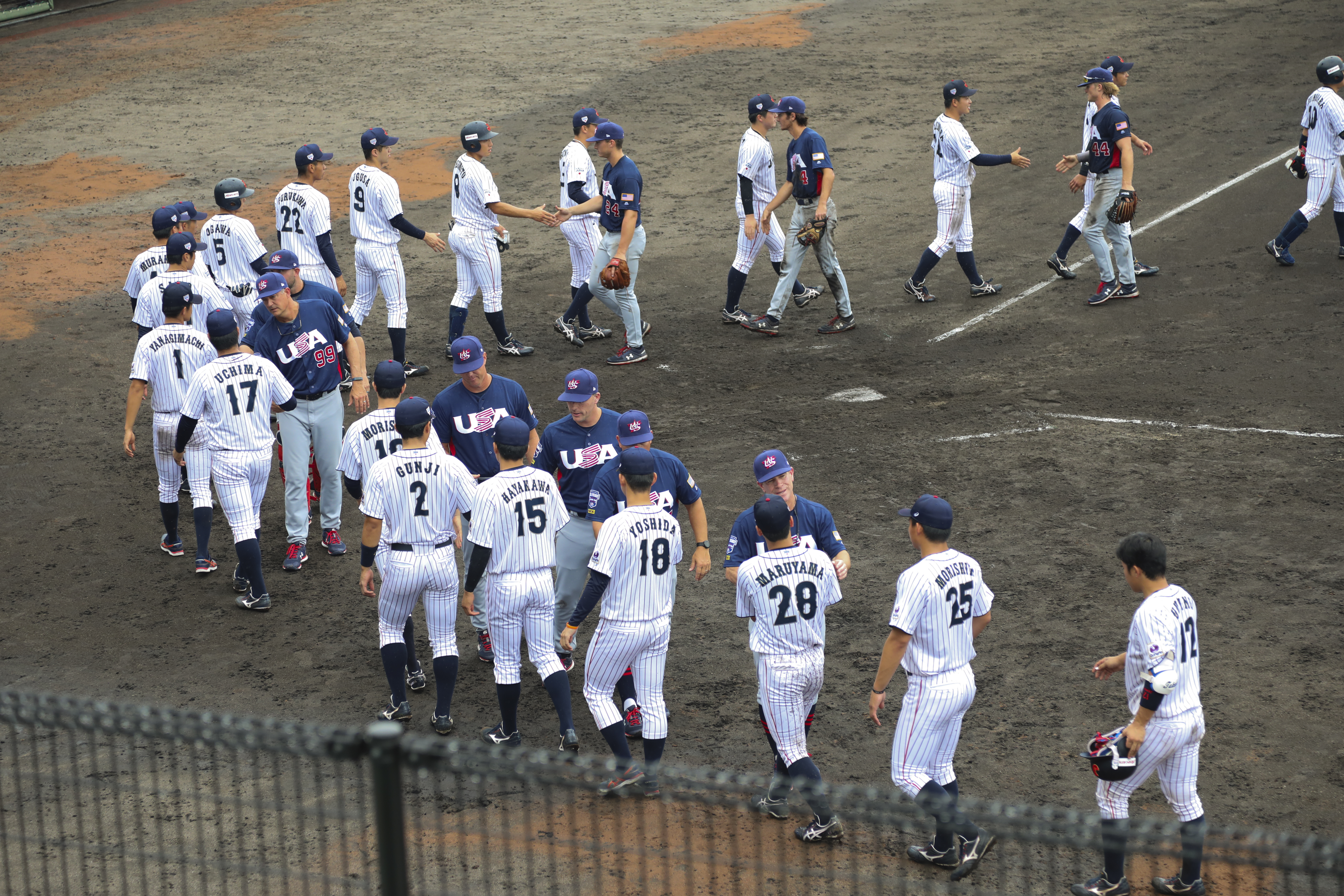
The Japanese and United States collegiate national baseball teams shake hands after a game in the 43rd Japan-USA Collegiate Baseball Championship Series at Kizuna Stadium in 2019.

Baseball is a major historical American export to Japan, where it is now the most popular sport. Throughout the 1870s, Baseball was brought over to the Japanese mainland through the games played by American Sailors and Businessman within the Western District. Baseball was a way Americans can express their "Yankeeness" and considers the sport of baseball as a national symbol of America. Through the exchanges of American educators, the Japanese during the Meiji Period, adopted baseball as a way to express their nationhood as efforts of "modernizing" Japan. Baseball would turn into a bridge between the relations of America and Japan throughout the early 20th century.

The sport played a meaningful role in helping Japanese and American citizens and diasporas to integrate with each other; for example, Japanese Americans played the game while interned during World War II as a way to show their enduring Americanness. In the interwar period, baseball served as a prominent cultural metaphor for Japan's interwar transition, with observers in the mid-1920s arguing that the nation's mastery of the game's "team spirit" signaled its readiness for political maturity. These exchanges were a central pillar of Japan's rapid Americanization, peaking with the 1934 goodwill tour featuring icons like Babe Ruth and Lou Gehrig that drew massive Japanese crowds.

Many Japanese born or players of Japanese descent play within Major League Baseball. Players like Hideo Nomo, Yu Darvish, Ichiro Suzuki, Yoshinobu Yamamoto and Shohei Ohtani are often synonymous with the baseball scene in America. Notably, in the Japanese professional baseball league, the NPB, many ex MLB American born players are also seen in many Japanese League rosters, such as Tyler Austin, Anthony Kay, and Foster Griffin.

In 2025, a documentary film funded by National Endowment for the Humanities explored the 150-year history of how baseball has served as a century-long cultural bridge between the United States and Japan due to the "people-to-people diplomacy" inherent in the sport. The film is structured around the lives of two former players, Mashi Murakami and Warren Cromartie, and includes discussion of the immense popularity of Japanese players Major League Baseball.

== Public opinion ==
Most Americans generally perceive Japan positively, with 84% viewing Japan favorably in 2021. According to a 2015 Pew survey, 68% of Americans believe that the US can trust Japan, compared to 75% of Japanese who believe that Japan can trust the United States. According to a 2026 Pew survey, 50% of people in Japan had a favorable view of the United States, while 50% had an unfavorable view; 25% had confidence in US president Donald Trump, while 74% did not. According to a Kyodo News survey in 2025, 47% of Japanese favor emphasizing ties with the United States over relations with China, 48% favor keeping ties with both countries at the same level, while 1% favor relations with China. According to a 2026 East Asia Institute and International House of Japan poll, 6.3% of Japanese have a good impression of the US, 32.7% have a rather good impression, 22.7% can't say either, 24.9% have a rather bad impression, while 13.3% have a bad impression.

A 2021 Gallup poll showed that 84% of Americans had a favorable view of Japan. However, only 1% of Americans regarded Japan as their closest foreign policy partner in a 2021 Pew survey, compared to 31% who did so for the UK, 13% for Canada, 9% for Israel, 7% for Germany, and 4% for France. According to a New York Times analysis of YouGov data in 2017, American survey respondents ranked Japan as their 21st closest ally, behind all other key American allies such as other G7 countries, Israel, Australia, New Zealand, and most other Western European countries. A 2026 Gallup poll showed that 85% of Americans had a favorable view of Japan, making it the country seen most favorably by Americans.

In 2026, The Economist stated that Japan is "patient and unemotional" as an ally to the US compared to Canadians and Europeans, adding; "To Europeans or Canadians who see Americans as kin, Trumpian aggression feels like a betrayal. In Japan America is not family: it is the superpower that defeated then helped to rebuild the country".

== Historiography ==
Because World War II was a global war, diplomatic historians start to focus on Japanese–American relations to understand why Japan had attacked the United States in 1941. This in turn led diplomatic historians to start to abandon the previous Euro-centric approach in favor of a more global approach. A sign of the changing times was the rise to prominence of such diplomatic historians such as the Japanese historian Chihiro Hosoya, the British historian Ian Nish, and the American historian Akira Iriye, which was the first time that Asian specialists became noted diplomatic historians. The Japanese reading public has a demand for books about American history and society. They read translations of English titles and Japanese scholars who are Americanists have been active in this sphere.

== See also ==
- Americans in Japan
- Anpo protests. 1959–1970
- Anti-American conservative
- Black Ships
- CIA activities in Japan
- Convention of Kanagawa
- Japanese Americans
  - Japanese American Citizens League
  - History of Japanese Americans
    - Internment of Japanese Americans
    - 442nd Infantry Regiment (United States)
    - 100th Infantry Battalion (United States)
    - Military Intelligence Service (United States)
- Japanese Embassy to the United States (1860)
- Japanese pop culture in the United States
- Occupation of Japan
  - Supreme Commander for the Allied Powers
- Pacific War. 1941–1945
  - Atomic bombings of Hiroshima and Nagasaki
  - War Plan Orange
- Plaza Accord, 1985 finance
- Quadrilateral Security Dialogue
- Security Treaty Between the United States and Japan
- Toshiba–Kongsberg scandal
- Treaty of Amity and Commerce (United States–Japan)
- Treaty of Mutual Cooperation and Security between the United States and Japan
- Treaty of Portsmouth, between Japan and Russia, 1905
- Treaty of San Francisco, 1951
- United States beef imports in Japan
- U.S.–Japan Alliance
  - United States Forces Japan
  - U.S.–Japan Status of Forces Agreement
  - Omoiyari Yosan, Japanese funds to support for the U.S. forces in Japan.
  - Operation Tomodachi, earthquake relief 2011

== Bibliography ==
=== Surveys ===
- Auslin, Michael R. Pacific Cosmopolitans: A Cultural History of U.S.-Japan Relations (2011)
- Calder, Kent E. Pacific Alliance: Reviving US-Japan Relations (Yale University Press, 2009).
- Dian, Matteo. The Evolution of the US–Japan Alliance The Eagle and the Chrysanthemum (Elsevier, 2015).
- Dolan, Ronald E.; Worden, Robert L., eds. (1992). Japan: A Country Study (5th ed.). Washington, D.C.: Federal Research Division, Library of Congress. ISBN 0-8444-0731-3. OCLC 24247433. Brief history of U.S.-Japan relations, pp. 384–393
- Emmerson, John K. and Harrison M. Holland, eds. The eagle and the rising sun : America and Japan in the twentieth century (1987) Online free to borrow
- Green, Michael J. By more than providence: Grand strategy and American power in the Asia Pacific since 1783 (Columbia UP, 2017). online; 725pp; comprehensive scholarly survey.
- Iokibe Makoto and Tosh Minohara (Eng. translation), eds. The History of US-Japan Relations: From Perry to the Present (2017) online
- Jackson, Carl T. "The Influence of Asia upon American Thought: A Bibliographical Essay." American Studies International 22#1 (1984), pp. 3–31, online covers China, India & Japan
- Jentleson, Bruce W. and Thomas G. Paterson, eds. Encyclopedia of U.S. Foreign Relations (4 vol 1997) 2: 446–458, brief overview.
- Kosaka Masataka. The Remarkable History of Japan-US Relations (2019)
- LaFeber, Walter (1997). The Clash: A History of U.S.-Japan Relations. online; also see online review by Jon Davidann
- Matray, James I., ed. (2002). East Asia and the United States: An Encyclopedia of Relations since 1784. Greenwood. excerpt v.2
- Mauch, Peter, and Yoneyuki Sugita. Historical Dictionary of United States-Japan Relations (2007) Excerpt and text search
- Miller, John H. American Political and Cultural Perspectives on Japan: From Perry to Obama (Lexington Books, 2014). excerpt
- Nester, William R. (2006). Power across the Pacific: A Diplomatic History of American Relations with Japan. online
- Neu, Charles E. The Troubled Encounter: The United States and Japan (Krieger, 1979).online
- Neumann, William L. America encounters Japan; from Perry to MacArthur (1961) online
- Reischauer, Edwin O. The United States and Japan (1957) online
- Sant, Van John, Peter Mauch, and Yoneyuki Sugita. The A to Z of United States-Japan Relations (Scarecrow Press, 2010).
- Shimamoto, Mayako, Koji Ito, and Yoneyuki Sugita. Historical Dictionary of Japanese Foreign Policy (Rowman & Littlefield, 2015).

=== Pre 1945 ===
- Asada, Sadao. From Mahan to Pearl Harbor: The Imperial Japanese Navy and the United States (Naval Institute Press, 2013).
- Austin, Ian Patrick. Ulysses S. Grant and Meiji Japan, 1869–1885: Diplomacy, Strategic Thought and the Economic Context of US-Japan Relations (Routledge, 2019).
- Barnhart, Michael A. Japan Prepares for Total War: The Search for Economic Security, 1919–1941 (Cornell University Press, 1987).
- Barnhart, Michael A. "Japan's economic security and the origins of the Pacific war." Journal of Strategic Studies (1981) 4#2 pp: 105–124.
- Beasley, William G. Japan Encounters the Barbarian: Japanese Travellers in America and Europe (Yale University Press, 1995).
- Borg, Dorothy, and Shumpei Okamoto, eds. Pearl Harbor as History: Japanese-American Relations, 1931–1941 (Columbia University Press, 1973), essays by scholars
- Buell, Raymond Leslie. "The Development of the Anti-Japanese Agitation in the United States," Political Science Quarterly (1922) 37#4 pp 605–638, part 1 in JSTOR; and "The Development of Anti-Japanese Agitation in the United States II," Political Science Quarterly (1923) pp 38.1 57–81; part 2 in JSTOR
- Burns, Richard Dean, and Edward Moore Bennett, eds. Diplomats in crisis: United States-Chinese-Japanese relations, 1919–1941 (1974) short articles by scholars from all three countries. online
- Cullen, L. M. A History of Japan, 1582–1941: Internal and External Worlds (Cambridge University Press, 2003).
- Davidann, Jon. "A World of Crisis and Progress: The American YMCA in Japan, 1890–1930" (Lehigh University Press, 1998).
- Davidann, Jon. Cultural Diplomacy in U.S.-Japanese Relations, 1919–1941 (Palgrave Macmillan, 2007).
- Dennett, Tyler. Americans in Eastern Asia: A Critical Study of the Policy of the United States with Reference to China, Japan, and Korea in the 19th Century (1922) 725 pages Online
- Dower, John. War without Mercy: Race and Power in the Pacific War (W. W. Norton, 1986) online.
- Dulles, Foster Rhea. Yankees and Samurai: America's Role in the Emergence of Modern Japan, 1791–1900 (Harper and Row, 1965) online
- Foster, John. American Diplomacy in the Orient (1903) Online 525 pp.
- Gallicchio, Marc S. The African American Encounter with Japan and China: Black Internationalism in Asia, 1895–1945 (University of North Carolina Press, 2000).
- Gripentrog, John. Prelude to Pearl Harbor: Ideology and Culture in US-Japan Relations, 1919–1941 (Rowman & Littlefield, 2021) online scholarly review of this book
- Griswold, A. Whitney. The Far Eastern Policy of the United States (1938) online
- Gruhl, Werner. Imperial Japan's World War Two: 1931–1945 (Routledge, 2007).
- Henning, Joseph M. Outposts of Civilization: Race, Religion, and the Formative Years of American-Japanese Relations (New York University Press, 2000).
- Hosoya, Chihiro. "Miscalculations in deterrent policy: Japanese-US relations, 1938–1941." Journal of Peace Research (1968) 5#2 pp: 97–115. online
- Iriye, Akira and Robert A. Wampler, eds. Partnership: The United States and Japan 1951–2001. (Kodansha International, 2001)
- Kawamura Noriko. Turbulence in the Pacific: Japanese-U.S. Relations During World War I (2000) excerpt
- Kawamura, Noriko. "Wilsonian idealism and Japanese claims at the Paris Peace Conference," Pacific Historical Review (1997) 66$4 pp 503–526.
- Koichiro, Matsuda. Japan and the Pacific, 1540–1920: Threat and Opportunity (Routledge, 2017).
- Leong, Andrew Way. "Early Japanese American Literature, 1815–1900." in Oxford Research Encyclopedia of Literature (2019). online
- Miller, Edward S. Bankrupting the Enemy: The US Financial Siege of Japan before Pearl Harbor (Naval Institute Press, 2007).
- Miller, Edward S. War Plan Orange: The US Strategy to Defeat Japan, 1897–1945 (Naval Institute Press, 2007).
- Miyoshi, Masao. As We Saw Them: The First Japanese Embassy to the United States (1860) (University of California Press, 1979)
- Morley, James William, ed. Japan's Foreign Policy, 1868–1941: A Research Guide (Columbia University Press, 1974), toward the United States, pp 407–62.
- Neu, Charles E. An Uncertain Friendship: Theodore Roosevelt and Japan, 1906–1909 (1967).online
- Nimmo, William F. Stars and Stripes across the Pacific: The United States, Japan, and Asia/Pacific Region, 1895–1945 (Praeger, 2001)
- Nish, Ian. Japanese Foreign Policy 1869–1942: Kasumigaseki to Miyakezaka (Routledge & Kegan Paul, 1977)
- Rapkin, David P. "The Emergence and Intensification of U.S.-Japan Rivalry in the Early Twentieth Century," pp 337–370 in William R. Thompson, ed. Great Power Rivalries (University of South Carolina Press, 1999) online
- Rosenstone, Robert A. Mirror in the Shrine: American Encounters with Meiji Japan (Harvard University Press, 1988).
- Spector, Ronald H. Eagle against the Sun: The American War with Japan (Vintage, 2012).
- Thorne, Christopher G. The Limits of Foreign Policy: The West, the League and the Far Eastern crisis of 1931–1933 (1972) online
- Treat, Paxson .Japan and the United States, 1853–1921 (1921) Online
- Utley, Jonathan G. Going to War With Japan, 1937–1941 (Fordham UP, 1985) online
- Van Sant, John E. Pacific Pioneers: Japanese Journeys to America and Hawaii, 1850–80 (University of Illinois Press, 2000).

=== Since 1945 ===
- Berger, Thomas U., Mike Mochizuki, and Jitsuo Tsuchiyama, eds. Japan in International Politics: The Foreign Policies of an Adaptive State (Lynne Rienner, 2007)
- Bridoux, Jeff. American Foreign Policy and Postwar Reconstruction: Comparing Japan and Iraq (2010)
- Calder, Kent E. "The Outlier Alliance: US-Japan Security Ties in Comparative Perspective," The Korean Journal of Defense Analysis (2003) 15#2 pp 31–56.
- Cha, Victor D. "Powerplay: Origins of the US Alliance System in Asia." International Security (2010) 34#3 pp 158–196.
- De Melo, Jaime, and David Tarr. "VERs under imperfect competition and foreign direct investment: A case study of the US-Japan auto VER." Japan and the World Economy 8.1 (1996): 11–33.
- Dower, John. Embracing Defeat: Japan in the Wake of World War II (W. W. Norton, 1999). online
- Eldridge, Robert D. The Origins of the Bilateral Okinawa Problem: Okinawa in Postwar US-Japan Relations, 1945–1952 (Routledge, 2013).
- Forsberg, Aaron. America and the Japanese Miracle: The Cold War Context of Japan's Postwar Economic Revival, 1950–1960 (2000).
- Gluck, Carol. "Entangling Illusions: Japanese and American Views of the Occupation," in New Frontiers in American-East Asian Relations, edited by Warren Cohen. (Columbia University Press, 1983).
- Gourevitch, Peter et al. eds. United States-Japan Relations and International Institutions after the Cold War 1995).
- Hamada, Tomoko. American Enterprise in Japan: Other Ways of Loving and Knowing (SUNY Press, 1991).
- Hoey, Fintan (April 26, 2021). "Clinton, Miyazawa, and Hosokawa: US-Japanese Relations in the "Lost Decade"". Sources and Methods: A Blog of the History and Public Policy Program. Wilson Center.
- Hook, Glenn D., et al. Japan's International Relations: Politics, Economics and Security (3rd ed. Routledge, 2011), comprehensive textbook
- Ikeda, Yoshiko. "Changing Images of Japanese Women in American Films: From the Teahouse of the August Moon (1956) to Memoirs of a Geisha (2005)." Regioninės studijos 3 (2009): 47–62. online
- Jensen, Richard, Jon Davidann, and Yoneyuki Sugita, eds. Trans-Pacific Relations: America, Europe, and Asia in the Twentieth Century (2003)
- Johnson, Sheila. The Japanese through American Eyes (1988).
- Kapur, Nick (2018). Japan at the Crossroads: Conflict and Compromise after Anpo. Cambridge, Massachusetts: Harvard University Press. ISBN 978-0674988484. excerpt
- Kelskey, Karen. Women on the Verge: Japanese Women, Western Dreams (2001)
- Kitamura, Hiroshi. Screening Enlightenment: Hollywood and the Cultural Reconstruction of Defeated Japan (Cornell University Press, 2010).
- Koikari, Mire. Pedagogy of Democracy: Feminism and the Cold War in the U.S. Occupation of Japan (2008)
- Kuliabin A. Semin S. Russia — a counterbalancing agent to the Asia. Zavtra Rossii, #28, July 17, 1997.
- Miller, Jennifer M. (2018). "Let's Not be Laughed at Anymore: Donald Trump and Japan from the 1980s to the Present". Journal of American-East Asian Relations. 25 (2): 138–168. doi:10.1163/18765610-02502004. S2CID 158386751.
- Nakasone Peace Institute, Kitaoka Shinichi, and Kubo Fumiaki, eds. The Japan-US Alliance of Hope: Asia-Pacific Maritime Security (2020)
- Oros, Andrew L. Normalizing Japan: Politics, Identity, and the Evolution of Security Practice (2008)
- O'Shea, Paul, and Sebastian Maslow. " 'Making the Alliance Even Greater': (Mis-)managing US-Japan Relations in the Age of Trump." Asian Security 17.2 (2021): 195–215. online
- Roosa, Robert V. The United States and Japan in the International Monetary System, 1946–1985 (1986) online
- Rozman, Gilbert, ed. Asia's Alliance Triangle: US-Japan-South Korea Relations at a Tumultuous Time (Palgrave Macmillan, 2015)
- Scalapino, Robert A., ed. The foreign policy of modern Japan (U of California Press, 1977).
- Schaller, Michael. Altered States: The United States and Japan since the Occupation (1997) excerpt
- Smitka, Michael. "Foreign Policy and the US Automotive Industry: By Virtue of Necessity?" Business and Economic History 28.2 (1999): 277–285, online
- Sugita, Yoneyuki. "The Yoshida Doctrine as a Myth." Japanese Journal of American Studies 27 (2016): 123–143 online.

=== Historiography ===
- Aruga, Natsuki, "Viewing American History from Japan" in Nicolas Barreyre; et al. (2014). Historians Across Borders: Writing American History in a Global Age. U of California Press. pp. 189–97. ISBN 9780520279292.
- Deptula, Nancy Monteith and Michael M. Hess. The Edwin O. Reischauer Institute of Japanese Studies: A Twenty-Year Chronicle. (Reischauer Institute, Harvard., 1996).
- Dower, John. 'Occupied Japan as History and Occupation History as Politics," Journal of Asian Studies (1975) 34#2 485–504.
- May, Ernest R. and James V. Thomson, Jr., eds. American-East Asian Relations: A Survey (Harvard UP, 1972).
- Molasky, Michael. The American Occupation of Japan and Okinawa: Literature and Memory (1999).
- Pederson, William D. ed. A Companion to Franklin D. Roosevelt (2011) pp 612–35, FDR and Japan

=== Primary sources ===
- Borton, Hugh. Spanning Japan's modern century: the memoirs of Hugh Borton (Lexington Books, 2002_. Hugh Borton was an American historian of Japan.
- Grew, Joseph C. Ten years in Japan, contemporary record drawn from the diaries and private and official papers of Joseph C. Grew, United States ambassador to Japan 1932–1942 (1944) online
- Miyazawa, Kiichi. Secret Talks between Tokyo and Washington: The Memoirs of Miyazawa Kiichi, 1949–1954 (Lexington Books, 2007).
- Miyoshi, Masao. As We Saw Them: The First Embassy to the United States (New York, 1994)
- Morris, Roland S. "The Memoirs of Viscount Ishii." Foreign Affairs 10#4 (1932), pp. 677–87 online
- Mura, David. Turning Japanese: Memoirs of a Sansei (Grove Press, 2006) online.
- Reischauer, Edwin. My Life Between Japan and America (1986). Edwin O. Reischauer was an American historian of Japan.
- Tsuchida, Nobuya, ed. Reflections: Memoirs of Japanese American Women in Minnesota (Pacific Asia Press, 1994).
- U.S. Congress, Papers Relating to the Foreign Relations of the United States with Japan 1931 – 1941 (1943) vol 1 online 431pp
  - U.S. Congress, Papers Relating to the Foreign Relations of the United States with Japan 1931 – 1941 (1943) vol 2 online 816 pp
- Yoshida, Shigeru. The Yoshida Memoirs. The Story of Japan in Crisis (1962)
