= Japanese economic miracle =

Period of rapid economic growth in Japan from the 1950s to 1970s

The Japanese economic miracle (Japanese: 高度経済成長, romanized: Kōdo keizai seichō) refers to a period of economic growth in post–World War II Japan. It generally refers to the period from 1955, around which time the per capita gross national income of the country recovered to pre-war levels, and to the onset of the 1973 oil crisis.

Before the war, Japan had achieved industrialisation from the second half of the 19th century, but light industry and agriculture remained the backbone of the economy, and poverty was widespread among the working class and tenant farmers. Heavy industry was primarily focused on the military, such as aviation, shipbuilding, and military vehicles, rather than the production of civilian goods. The Second World War resulted in the loss of all its colonial possessions, and both the mainland's industrial capabilities and population were heavily damaged. After the war, the government was deep in debt, while the people suffered privation of vital supplies, which inevitably caused hyperinflation.

Under the Allied Occupation Forces, Japan's economy underwent significant structural changes, which initially included the dissolution of all major zaibatsu and the weakening of heavy industries and scientific research, so as to deprive the country of the ability to wage war ever again. The government and the Bank of Japan had to deal with hyperinflation while rebuilding the economy under these restrictions. However, along with West Germany, Japan later benefited from a fundamental shift in US policy, which now tried to help rebuild these former enemies in a democratized form, rather than weakening them, in an effort to prevent the spread of communism in their respective regions.

Japan's economy gradually recovered to regain pre-war standard of living towards the mid-1950s, around which time the 'economic miracle' started. During this period, Japan's economic growth was driven by its heavy industries and the expansion of the middle class, which provided both a large domestic consumer market and bank savings. These savings were, in turn, lent to companies to invest in fixed capital. The Japanese government's interventionism also played a role, most notably through the Income Doubling Plan, conceived by Osamu Shimomura and implemented by prime minister Hayato Ikeda. Japan also benefited from the Bretton Woods system, which pegged major currencies, including the yen, to the United States dollar. During the economic boom, Japan rapidly became the world's third-largest economy, after the United States and the Soviet Union. Japan joined the OECD as an early member in the 1960s, and became a founding member of the G7. By the 1970s, Japan was no longer expanding as quickly as it had in the previous decades despite per-worker productivity remaining high.

== History ==
=== Recovery stage (1946–1954) ===
1946 American newsreel on life in Japan: extreme inflation, housing problems, and shortages of food and other vital supplies are mentioned.

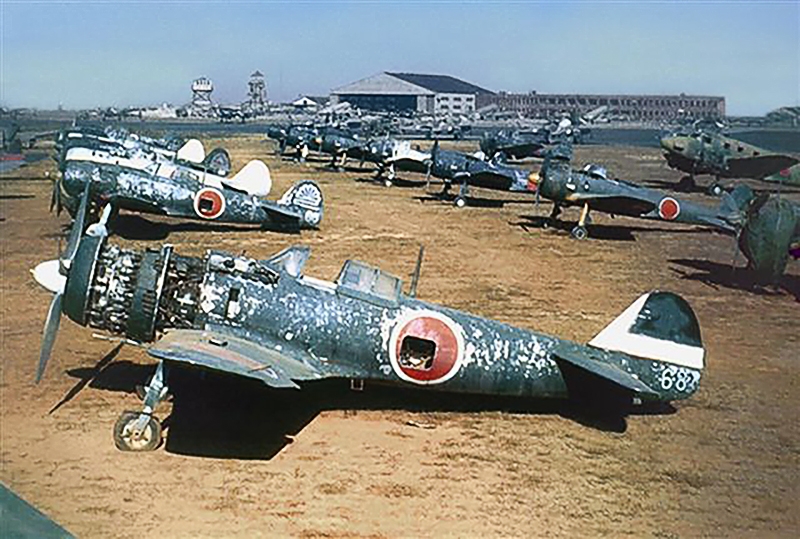
Although SCAP banned all military-related activities including research, such as aviation, their foundations survived and became the basis for the resurgence of Japan's heavy industries in the 1950s.

The Japanese economy was in ruins following the end of World War II. Moreover, by 1946, Japan was on the verge of a nationwide famine that was averted only by American shipments of food. The virtual destruction of the Japanese standard of living, combined with the military threat presented by the Soviet Union, compelled the United States to support a wide-reaching economic recovery. Every country experienced some industrial growth in the post-war period, but those countries that achieved a heavy drop in industrial output due to war damage such as Japan, West Germany and Italy, achieved the most rapid recovery. In the case of Japan, industrial production decreased in 1946 to 27.6% of the pre-war level, but recovered in 1951 and reached 350% in 1960. By the end of the American occupation of Japan in 1952, the United States had successfully reintegrated Japan into the global economy and rebuilt the economic infrastructure that would later form the launching pad for the Japanese economic miracle.

Arguably, one reason for Japan's quick recovery from war trauma was the economic reform by the government. The government body principally concerned with industrial policy in Japan was the Ministry of International Trade and Industry. One of the major economic reforms was to adopt the "Inclined Production Mode" (傾斜生産方式, keisha seisan hoshiki). The "Inclined Production Mode" refers to the inclined production that primarily focuses on the production of raw materials including steel and coal. Textile production occupied more than 23.9% of the total industrial production before the economic miracle. Moreover, to further stimulate growth, the Japanese government encouraged women to enter the labor market. The legislation on recruitment contains three components: the restriction placed on regional recruitment and relocation of workers, the banning of the direct recruitment of new school leavers, and the direct recruitment of non-school leavers under explicitly detailed regulations issued by the Ministry of Labour.

Another reason that accounts for Japan's recovery from WWII in the early 1950s was the outbreak of the Korean War in 1950. The war was fought in a territory that had been a Japanese colony until 1945, which was later divided between the Soviet-backed North and the US-backed South. As a result, the US had to procure military supplies from Japan to support the war effort in Korea. The country's heavy industries, which were on the verge of bankruptcy, were saved by orders to repair thousands of damaged planes and military vehicles, while car companies such as Toyota flourished with orders for numerous lorries and other military vehicles.

=== High increasing stage (1954–1972) ===
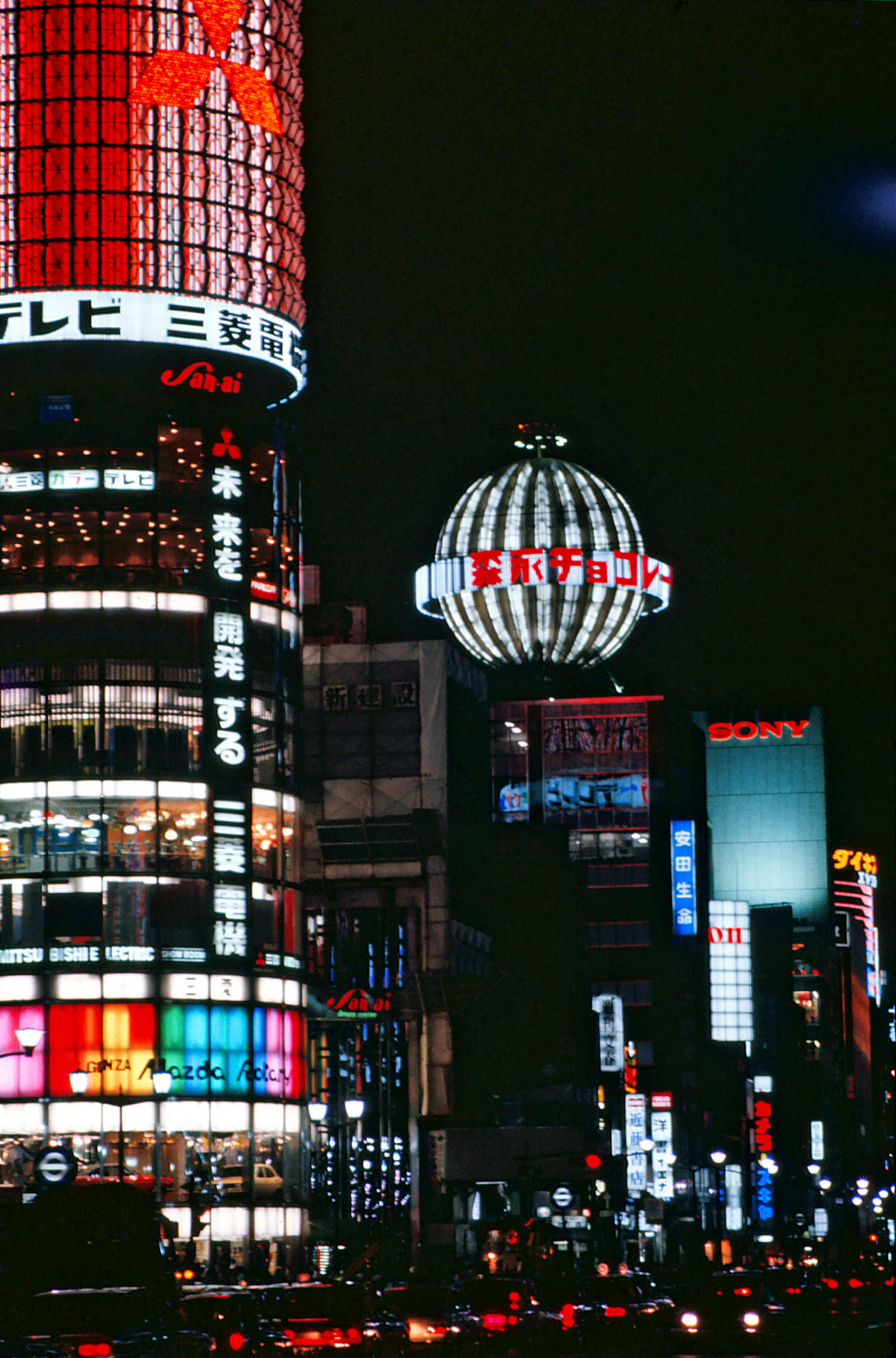
Consumer electronics shops in Tokyo in 1971: consumer electronics and cars became symbols of the Japanese middle class

After regaining its pre-war standard of living in the mid-1950s, Japan's economy soared until the early 1970s. Between 1957 and 1973, the country saw an annualised growth rate of around 10% in terms of GNP. In 1964, Japan joined the OECD, which had been established three years earlier and has been widely regarded as one of the primary indicators of developed nation status. At the time, Japan was the only member from the Pacific Asia and Oceania region until Australia joined in 1971, followed by New Zealand in 1973 and South Korea in 1996. That same year, Japan hosted the Tokyo Olympics, and large infrastructure projects such as the Shinkansen and expressways were completed to accommodate the increased demand for transport brought about by the event.

The Japanese Economic Yearbooks from 1967 to 1971 witnessed a significant increase. In 1967, the yearbook said: the Japanese economy in 1966 thus made an advance more rapidly than previously expected. In 1968, the yearbook said that the Japanese economy continued to make a sound growth after it had a bottom in the autumn of 1965. The words "increase", "growth" and "upswing" filled the summaries of the yearbooks from 1967 to 1971. The reasons for Japan to complete industrialization are also complicated, and the major characteristic of this time is the influence of government policies of the Hayato Ikeda administration, vast consumption, and vast export.

Ajit Singh argues that throughout the 1950s, 60s, and 70s, Japan did not adhere to free-market principles. Instead, Japan pursued policies that involved heavy government intervention in the economy, maintaining highly protectionist policies, discouraging foreign direct investment, and remaining largely unintegrated with the global economy despite its significant export orientation.

==== Influence of government policies: Ikeda administration and keiretsu ====
In 1954, the economic system MITI had cultivated from 1949 to 1953 came into full effect. Prime Minister Hayato Ikeda, whom Chalmers Johnson calls "the single most important individual architect of the Japanese economic miracle," pursued a policy of heavy industrialization. This policy led to the emergence of 'over-loaning' (a practice that continues today) in which the Bank of Japan issues loans to city banks who in turn issue loans to industrial conglomerates. Since there was a shortage of capital in Japan at the time, industrial conglomerates borrowed beyond their capacity to repay, often beyond their net worth, causing city banks in turn to over-borrow from the Bank of Japan. This gave the national Bank of Japan complete control over dependent local banks.

The system of over-loaning, combined with the government's relaxation of anti-monopoly laws (a remnant of SCAP control) also led to the re-emergence of conglomerate groups called keiretsu that mirrored the wartime conglomerates, or zaibatsu. Led by the economic improvements of Sony businessmen Masaru Ibuka and Akio Morita, the keiretsu efficiently allocated resources and became competitive internationally.

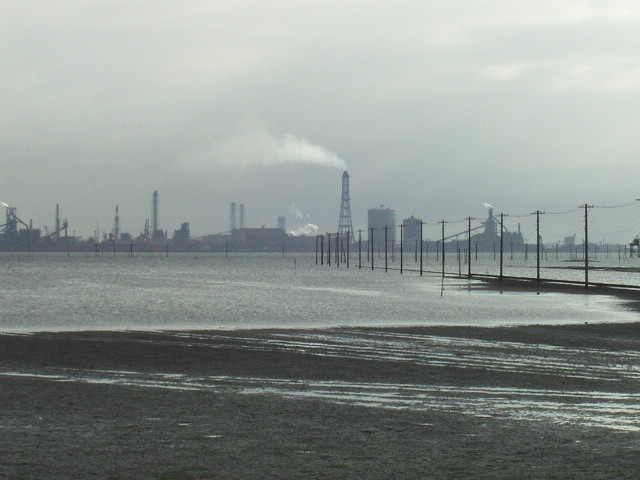
Japanese coal- and metal-related industry experienced an annual growth rate of 25% in the 1960s, with the steel plant of Nippon Steel Corporation in Chiba Prefecture being a notable one.

At the heart of the keiretsu conglomerates' success lay city banks, which lent generously, formalizing cross-share holdings in diverse industries. The keiretsu spurred both horizontal and vertical integration, locking out foreign companies from Japanese industries. Keiretsu had close relations with MITI and each other through the cross-placement of shares, providing protection from foreign take-overs. For example, 83% of Japan's Development Bank's finances went toward strategic industries: shipbuilding, electric power, coal and steel production. Keiretsu proved crucial to protectionist measures that shielded Japan's sapling economy.

The Ikeda administration also instituted the Foreign Exchange Allocation Policy, a system of import controls designed to prevent the flooding of Japan's markets by foreign goods. MITI used the foreign exchange allocation to stimulate the economy by promoting exports, managing investment and monitoring production capacity. In 1953, MITIs revised the Foreign Exchange Allocation Policy to promote domestic industries and increase the incentive for exports by revising the export-link system. A later revision-based production capacity on foreign exchange allocation to prevent foreign dumping.

==== Vast consumption: from survival to recreation ====
During the time of reconstruction and before the 1973 oil crisis, Japan managed to complete its industrialization process, gaining significant improvement in living standards and witnessing a significant increase in consumption. The average monthly consumption of urban family households doubled from 1955 to 1970. Moreover, the proportions of consumption in Japan was also changing. The consumption in daily necessities, such as food and clothing and footwear, was decreasing. Contrastingly, the consumption in recreational, entertainment activities and goods increased, including furniture, transportation, communications, and reading. The great increase in consumption stimulated the growth in GDP as it incentivized production.

==== Vast export: Golden Sixties and shift to export trade ====
The period of rapid economic growth between 1955 and 1961 paved the way for the Golden Sixties, the second decade that is generally associated with the Japanese economic miracle. In 1965, Japan's nominal GDP was estimated at just over $91 billion. Fifteen years later, in 1980, the nominal GDP had soared to a record $1.065 trillion.

Under the leadership of Prime Minister Ikeda, former minister of MITI, the Japanese government undertook an ambitious "Income Doubling Plan" (所得倍増計画). The plan called for doubling the size of Japan's economy in ten years through a combination of tax breaks, targeted investment, an expanded social safety net, and incentives to increase exports and industrial development. To achieve the goal of doubling of the economy in ten years, the plan called for an average annual economic growth rate of 7.2%. In fact, Japan's annual growth averaged more than 10% over the course of the Plan, and the economy doubled in size in less than seven years.

Ikeda introduced the Income Doubling Plan in response to the massive Anpo protests in 1960 against the US-Japan Security Treaty, as part of an effort to shift Japan's national dialogue away from contentious political struggles toward building a consensus around pursuit of rapid economic growth. However, Ikeda and his brain trust, which most notably included the economist Osamu Shimomura, had been developing the plan since mid-1959.

Under the Income Doubling Plan, Ikeda lowered interest rates and rapidly expanded government investment in Japan's infrastructure, building highways, high-speed railways, subways, airports, port facilities, and dams. Ikeda's government also expanded government investment in the previously neglected communications sector of the Japanese economy. Each of these acts continued the Japanese trend towards a managed economy that epitomized the mixed economic model.

The Income Doubling Plan was widely viewed as a success in achieving both its political and economic objectives. According to historian Nick Kapur, the plan "enshrined 'economic growthism' as a sort of secular religion of both the Japanese people and their government, bringing about a circumstance in which both the effectiveness of the government and the worth of the populace came to be measured above all by the annual percentage change in GDP."

Besides Ikeda's adherence to government intervention and regulation of the economy, his government pushed trade liberalization. By April 1960, trade imports had been 41 percent liberalized (compared to 22 percent in 1956). Ikeda planned to liberalize trade to 80 percent within three years. However, his liberalization goals met with severe opposition from both industries who had thrived on over-loaning and the nationalist public who feared foreign enterprise takeovers. The Japanese press likened liberalization to "the second coming of the black ships," in reference to the black ships Commodore Matthew C. Perry had sailed into Tokyo Bay in 1853 to open Japan to international trade via a show of military force. Accordingly, Ikeda moved toward liberalization of trade only after securing a protected market through internal regulations that favored Japanese products and firms, and never achieved his ambitious 80 percent goal.

Ikeda also set up numerous allied foreign aid distribution agencies to demonstrate Japan's willingness to participate in the international order and to promote exports. The creation of these agencies not only acted as a small concession to international organizations, but also dissipated some public fears about liberalization of trade. Ikeda furthered Japan's global economic integration by negotiating for Japan's entry into the OECD in 1964. By the time Ikeda left office, the GNP was growing at a phenomenal rate of 13.9 percent.

=== The end of the Japanese economic miracle (1973) ===
Japan's economic miracle ended in 1973, when the first oil-price shock struck Japan (1973 oil crisis). The price of oil increased from 3 dollars per barrel to over 13 dollars per barrel.

During this time, Japan's industrial production decreased by 20%, as the supply capacity could not respond effectively to the rapid expansion of demand, and increased investments in equipment often invited unwanted results—tighter supply and higher prices of commodities. Moreover, the Second Oil Shock in 1978 and 1979 exacerbated the situation as the oil price again increased from 13 dollars per barrel to 39.5 dollars per barrel. Despite being seriously impacted by the two oil crises, Japan was able to withstand the impact and managed to transfer from a product-concentrating to a technology-concentrating production form.

== Government contributions ==
The Japanese financial recovery continued even after SCAP departed and the economic boom propelled by the Korean War abated. The Japanese economy survived from the deep recession caused by a loss of the U.S. payments for military procurement and continued to make gains. By the late 1960s, Japan had risen from the ashes of World War II to achieve an astoundingly rapid and complete economic recovery. According to Knox College Professor Mikiso Hane, the period leading up to the late 1960s saw "the greatest years of prosperity Japan had seen since the Sun Goddess shut herself up behind a stone door to protest her brother Susano-o's misbehaviour." The Japanese government contributed to the post-war Japanese economic miracle by stimulating private sector growth, first by instituting regulations and protectionism that effectively managed economic crises and later by concentrating on trade expansion.

=== Role of the Ministry of International Trade and Industry ===
The Ministry of International Trade and Industry (MITI) was involved in Japan's post-war economic recovery. According to some scholars, no other governmental regulation or organization had more economic impact than MITI. "The particular speed, form, and consequences of Japanese economic growth," Chalmers Johnson writes, "are not intelligible without reference to the contributions of MITI" (Johnson, vii). Established in 1949, MITI's role began with the "Policy Concerning Industrial Rationalization" (1950) that coordinated efforts by industries to counteract the effects of SCAP's deflationary regulations. In this way, MITI formalized cooperation between the Japanese government and private industry. The extent of the policy was such that if MITI wished to "double steel production, the neo-zaibatsu already has the capital, the construction assets, the makers of production machinery, and most of the other necessary factors already available in-house". The Ministry coordinated various industries, including the emerging keiretsu, toward a specific end, usually toward the intersection of national production goals and private economic interests.

MITI also boosted the industrial security by untying the imports of technology from the imports of other goods. MITI's Foreign Capital Law granted the ministry power to negotiate the price and conditions of technology imports. This element of technological control allowed it to promote industries it deemed promising. The low cost of imported technology allowed for rapid industrial growth. Productivity was greatly improved through new equipment, management, and standardization.

MITI gained the ability to regulate all imports with the abolition of the Economic Stabilization Board and the Foreign Exchange Control Board in August 1952. Although the Economic Stabilization Board was already dominated by MITI, the Yoshida Governments transformed it into the Economic Deliberation Agency, a mere "think tank," in effect giving MITI full control over all Japanese imports. Power over the foreign exchange budget was also handed directly to MITI.

MITI's establishment of the Japan Development Bank also provided the private sector with low-cost capital for long-term growth. The Japan Development Bank introduced access to the Fiscal Investment and Loan Plan, a massive pooling of individual and national savings. At the time FILP controlled four times the savings of the world's largest commercial bank. With this financial power, FILP was able to maintain an abnormally high number of Japanese construction firms (more than twice the number of construction firms of any other nation with a similar GDP).

== See also ==
- Developmental state
- Dodge Line
- Economic history of Japan
- Four Asian Tigers
- Hayato Ikeda
- Income Doubling Plan
- Italian economic miracle
- Miracle on the Han River
- Post-war economic boom
- Spanish miracle
- Taiwan Miracle
- Trente Glorieuses
- Wirtschaftswunder
