= Yutaka Bitō =

Japanese artist (1926-1998)

- Born: March 30, 1926; Akabane, Tokyo, Empire of Japan
- Died: August 26, 1998 (aged 72); Akabane, Tokyo, Japan
- Education: Tokyo Fine Arts School
- Movement: Socialist Realism, Reportage, Surrealism

Yutaka Bitō (尾藤 豊, Bitō Yutaka; March 30, 1926 – August 26, 1998) was a Japanese artist closely associated with the postwar avant-garde art movement in Japan. In the 1950s, he was a leading exponent of the "reportage" style of Japanese socialist realist art, and later became known for his Surrealist paintings.

== Early life ==
Yutaka Bitō was born in Akabane, Tokyo on March 30, 1926. In 1942, he graduated from the architecture department of Yasuda Technical High School. He then enrolled in the architecture program at the Tokyo Fine Arts School (present-day Tokyo University of the Arts). During World War II, his education was interrupted when he was drafted into service along with other art students to produce aeronautical charts of Etajima in support of the war effort.

== Postwar avant-garde artist ==
In 1947, Bitō graduated from the Tokyo Fine Arts School with a degree in architecture. That same year, he helped co-found the Avant-Garde Art Society (前衛美術会, Zen'ei Bijutsukai), along with Chozaburō Inoue, Iri Maruki, Tadashi Yoshii and others, and participated in its first exhibition. This "avant-garde" art collective closely aligned itself with the "vanguard" Japan Communist Party (JCP), and dedicated itself to producing works of socialist realism in line with the JCP's "cultural policy." In particular, Bitō became one of the pioneers of "reportage" painting, a Japanese sub-genre of socialist realist art.

In 1953, Bitō joined with Hiroshi Katsuragawa, Hiroshi Teshigahara, Hiroshi Nakamura, On Kawara, Tatsuo Ikeda, Kikuji Yamashita, and several other young artists to form the artistic cooperative "Young Artists' Alliance" (青年美術家連合, Seinen Bijutsuka Rengō). The group lasted until 1956, holding joint art study sessions, publishing a magazine called "Art of Today," and staging exhibitions.

In 1960, in conjunction with the massive Anpo Protests against the U.S.-Japan Security Treaty, Bitō established a new art collective to produce art in support of the protests, called the "Revolutionary Artists' Front" (革命的芸術家戦線結成, Kakumeiteki Geijutsuka Sensen). After the failure of the Anpo protests to stop the treaty, and the Communist Party's failure to act as a proper vanguard of revolution, Bitō and many other artists turned away from the doctrines of the Communist Party in favor of taking their art practice in more individualistic directions. Thereafter, Bitō's paintings transitioned away from socialist realism toward a Surrealist mode.

== Later life ==
Beginning in the 1980s, Bitō's paintings began to receive greater recognition, and his works were the subject of a number of solo exhibitions in Tokyo. His works also came to be seen as especially representative of art trends in the postwar period, and were featured as part of a number of retrospective exhibitions on postwar Japanese avant-garde art at a variety of museums around Japan.

Bitō died of heart failure in Akabane Hospital on August 26, 1998.
