= Hiroshi Katsuragawa =

Japanese artist (1924–2011)

- Born: August 20, 1924; Sapporo, Hokkaidō, Japan
- Died: October 16, 2011 (aged 87)
- Education: Tama Art University
- Occupation: artist

Hiroshi Katsuragawa (桂川 寛, Katsuragawa Hiroshi; August 20, 1924 – October 16, 2011) was a Japanese artist closely associated with the postwar avant-garde art movement in Japan. His artworks were featured prominently in the 2010 documentary film ANPO: Art X War by American documentary filmmaker Linda Hoaglund.

== Early life ==
Hiroshi Katsuragawa was born in Sapporo, Hokkaidō, Japan in 1924. He enrolled in the Sapporo Commercial School (present-day Hokkai Gakuen Sapporo High School) in 1937. While still in high school his art was selected for exhibition in the Hokkaidō Art Association's annual Hokkaidō Art Exhibition. After graduating, Katsuragawa worked for a time at the Sapporo District Meteorological Observatory.

== Postwar avant-garde artist ==
In 1948, Katsuragawa moved to Tokyo and matriculated at Tama Art University. In 1949, he joined the art collective Seiki no Kai ("Century Association") which included artists and writers such as artist Hiroshi Teshigahara, poet Hiroshi Sekine, author Kōbō Abe, and others. That same year, he produced the cover art for Sekine's first collection of poetry Sabaku no ki ("Desert Tree"), for which Teshigahara provided interior illustrations. Around this time Katsuragawa dropped out of Tama Art University.

In 1952, Katsuragawa joined the Avant-Garde Art Society (前衛美術会, Zen'ei Bijutsukai), which had been formed by Chozaburō Inoue, Iri Maruki, Tadashi Yoshii and others in 1947 and was closely aligned with the Japan Communist Party (JCP). That same year, bowing to Soviet Premier Joseph Stalin's demand that they start an immediate communist revolution, the JCP ordered Katsuragawa and other young artists to go to Ogōchi, a farming village in the mountains west of Tokyo that was scheduled to be obliterated by a dam, and support the formation of "mountain village guerrilla squads" (sanson kōsakutai) by mobilizing farmers' discontent with the dam construction in order to foment a violent communist revolution. Katsuragawa spent most of his time drawing socialist realist sketches of the suffering of the impoverished farm families and distributing copies of them as propaganda leaflets.

The activists who went to Ogōchi village ultimately failed to convince the farmers to start an uprising and felt betrayed when the Communist Party abruptly repudiated its commitment to immediate revolution. Dispirited by their experiences, the Avant-Garde Art Society became inactive and ceased holding its annual exhibition. However, in 1953 Katsuragawa helped form a new "Young Artists' Alliance" (青年美術家連合, Shōnen Bijutsuka Rengō) with like-minded artists such as Hiroshi Nakamura, On Kawara, Tatsuo Ikeda, Yutaka Bitō, and Kikuji Yamashita. For a while, Katsuragwa continued to produce socialist realist art in an activist vein, including artworks celebrating the farmers protesting the expansion of a US military air base as part of the Sunagawa Struggle of 1955–1957.

In 1960, amid the massive Anpo Protests against the US-Japan Security Treaty, the Avant-Garde Art Society was inspired to revive itself by the artists' collective anger at the renewal of treaty. Katsuragawa contributed a large-scale painting in a surrealist vein called Even So They Keep On Going (それでもかれらはゆく, Sore demo karera wa yuku) which depicted a wounded person hobbling along on crutches, whose bandages were strongly reminiscent of the National Diet Building in Tokyo which was the focus of the anti-Treaty protests. Katsura continued submitting artworks to the revived Avant-Garde Art Society's annual exhibitions every year until the final exhibition in 1963.

After the failure of the Anpo protests to stop the treaty, and the Communist Party's failure to act as a proper vanguard of revolution, Katsuragawa and other artists turned away from the Communist Party and socialist realism in favor of taking their art practice in more individualistic directions. However, Katsuragawa continued to contribute artworks to exhibitions supporting anti-war and anti-imperialism stances, such as the "War Exhibition" in 1967, the "Anti-War and Liberation Exhibition" in 1968, the "Emperor, War, and Asia Exhibition" in 1975, and the "Palestinian Solidarity Exhibition" in 1987.

== Later life ==
In 2004 a retrospective solo exhibition of Katsuragawa's works was held at Art Gallery Kan in Tokyo. In 2010, Katsuragawa's works were prominently featured in American filmmaker Linda Hoaglund's documentary film about postwar Japanese anti-war art, ANPO: Art X War. That same year, Katsuragawa donated 50 of his large-scale oil paintings to Tokyo's Toshima Ward, where he had resided since 1961, and two more retrospective solo exhibitions of his work were held.

Katsuragawa died of pneumonia on October 16, 2011.
