= ANPO: Art X War =

- Japanese poster
- Directed by: Linda Hoaglund
- Produced by: Aaron Ernst; Linda Hoaglund
- Starring: Makoto Aida; Setsu Asakura; Hiroshi Hamaya; Kazutoshi Handô
- Edited by: Scott A. Burgess
- Music by: Shoko Nagai; Satoshi Takeishi
- Release date: September 2010 (TIFF)
- Running time: 89 minutes
- Country: United States
- Language: Japanese

ANPO: Art X War is a 2010 documentary film directed by Linda Hoaglund.

The film traces the public outrage that followed in the wake of the passing of Treaty of Mutual Cooperation and Security between the United States and Japan (better known in Japan as anpo joyaku, or simply ANPO) through Japanese parliament by the Nobusuke Kishi-led government on May 20, 1960. The main point of contention amongst hundreds of thousands of Japanese about ANPO was that it would allow U.S. military bases to remain on Japanese soil. The ratification of the ANPO Treaty led to a storm of public protests by members of Japanese labor unions, student organizations and also many everyday Japanese. The treaty was renewed in 1970 and just over 60 bases, offices, barracks and branches of the U.S. military still occupy Japan.

ANPO: Art X War is not simply a historical or political documentary. Instead it views the ANPO Treaty and the uproar surrounding it through the eyes of Japanese artists who lived through the tumultuous years following its passing and chronicled the public protests—painters Hiroshi Nakamura, Hiroshi Katsuragawa, Kikuji Yamashita, Tadanori Yokoo, Tatsuo Ikeda, Chozaburō Inoue and Shigeo Ishii, photographers Hiroshi Hamaya, Miyako Ishiuchi, Shōmei Tōmatsu, Eikoh Hosoe, Osamu Nagahama and Mao Ishikawa, as well as film-makers such as Nagisa Oshima, Kinji Fukasaku, Yasuzo Masumura and Yukio Tomizawa, the director of the 1960 documentary Rage at ANPO, the only film to capture the protests. Hoaglund interviews many of these men and women about their memories of the ANPO protests and their direct experiences with the U.S. Military in Japan. She also speaks with a new generation of artists including Makoto Aida, Sachiko Kazama and Chikako Yamashiro about how the ANPO Treaty and the continuing U.S. presence in Japan has affected their artistic and personal vision. 175 works by all these artists are shown in the film.

Since its debut at the 2010 Toronto International Film Festival, ANPO: Art X War has screened at the 2010 Vancouver International Film Festival, the 2010 Doc NYC film festival, the Minneapolis/Saint Paul Asian American Film Festival and MoMA's Documentary Fortnight 2011.

The artwork presented in the film has been the subject of an eight-page article in the January 1, 2011 issue of Art in America, and an exhibition of 52 of Miyako Ishiuchi's Hiroshima series of photographs were held at the Museum of Anthropology at the University of British Columbia in October 2011.

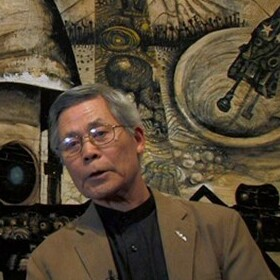
Artist Hiroshi Nakamura
