= Kikuji Yamashita =

Japanese artist (1926–1998)

- Born: October 8, 1919; Miyoshi, Tokushima, Empire of Japan
- Died: November 23, 1986 (aged 67)
- Movement: Surrealism

Kikuji Yamashita (山下 菊二, Yamashita Kikuji; October 8, 1919 – November 23, 1986) was a Japanese Surrealist painter associated with the postwar avant-garde art movement in Japan. His artworks were featured prominently in the 2010 documentary film ANPO: Art X War by American documentary filmmaker Linda Hoaglund.

== Early life ==
Kikuji Yamashita was born in Miyoshi city, Tokushima prefecture on October 8, 1919. In 1937, he graduated from Takamatsu Crafts High School in Kagawa Prefecture. In 1938, he moved to Tokyo and began studying painting under the renowned Japanese Surrealist Ichirō Fukuzawa, who introduced him to the work of Max Ernst, Salvador Dalí, and Hieronymus Bosch. In 1939, he was drafted into the Japanese military and sent to fight in China. Although he survived the war, feelings of guilt and traumatic memories of his wartime experience, including participating in the torture and murder of a Chinese prisoner, helped shape his ferociously anti-war outlook that was reflected in his later art.

== Postwar avant-garde artist ==
After the war, the Japan Communist Party was legalized by the American-led Allied Occupation of Japan, and Yamashita participated in the formation of the JCP-affiliated Japan Art Association (日本美術会, Nihon Bijitsukai) in 1946. That following year, he helped co-found the Avant-Garde Art Society (前衛美術会, Zen'ei Bijutsukai), along with Yutaka Bitō, Chozaburō Inoue, Iri Maruki, Tadashi Yoshii and others, and participated in its first exhibition. Like the Japan Art Society, this "avant-garde" art collective was closely aligned with the "vanguard" Japan Communist Party (JCP), and dedicated itself to producing works of socialist realism in line with the JCP's "cultural policy."

In 1952, bowing to Soviet Premier Joseph Stalin's demand that they start an immediate communist revolution, the JCP ordered young artists to go to Ogōchi, a farming village in the mountains west of Tokyo that was scheduled to be obliterated by a dam, and support the formation of "mountain village guerrilla squads" (sanson kōsakutai) by mobilizing farmers' discontent with the dam construction in order to foment a violent communist revolution. Yamashita was sent to Ogōchi village along with Yutaka Bitō, Hiroshi Katsuragawa, and others. Yamashita was supposed to paint kamishibai paper plays to inspire and galvanize the farmers into forming a militant resistance movement against the dam. Ignoring this directive, Yamashita instead produced large-scale surrealist oil paintings allegorizing the plight of the farmers, signaling the beginning of his break with the Communist Party's rigid ideological directives. It was during this period that he painted his most famous work, "The Tale of Akebono Village," depicting a murdered tenant's rights activist lying facedown in a pool of blood and a grandmother who had hanged herself after being tricked into bankruptcy. Unsympathetic characters, such as villagers who sided with the landlord and a policeman, are depicted as anthropomorphic dogs and other animals, a theme that would continue in Yamashita's later works.

After returning from the mountains in 1953, Yamashita joined with Bitō, Katsuragawa, Hiroshi Teshigahara, Hiroshi Nakamura, On Kawara, Tatsuo Ikeda, and several other young artists to form the artistic cooperative "Young Artists' Alliance" (青年美術家連合, Seinen Bijutsuka Rengō). The group lasted until 1956, holding joint art study sessions, publishing a magazine called "Art of Today," and staging exhibitions.

In June 1960, at the height the massive Anpo Protests against the U.S.-Japan Security Treaty, Yamashita joined with philosopher Takaaki Yoshimoto and others to form the "June Action Committee" to rally protesters against the treaty. However, Yamashita also treated the protests as an artistic event, and was observed to randomly show up marching along with groups with which he had no affiliation, calling out strange words and squeezing his way into their ranks with humble apologies, causing bewilderment and laughter on the part of the marchers with his strange antics in an effort to get the “extremely serious youth” to “lighten up.”

In 1962, Yamashita held his first solo exhibition. In the late 1960s, long after the 1960 Anpo protests had failed to stop the U.S.-Japan Security Treaty, Yamashita was still painting unsettling Surrealist paintings lambasting the continued presence of U.S. military bases on Japanese soil.

== Later life ==
Although he continued to paint hundreds of canvases, he deliberately avoided seeking out commercial success, perhaps out of a sense of guilt, and was only able to survive as a full-time artist thanks to his devoted wife's earnings as a beautician. In 1970, Yamashita penned an essay in which he admitted to his wartime role in murdering a Chinese prisoner, and spoke of the guilt he still felt at his actions.

In 1974, Yamashita founded a new artistic collective called "Hitohito" (从), with which he remained until his retirement in 1984 due to ill health.

Yamashita was a bird lover, and kept several owls as pets in his home. Yamashita died on November 23, 1986, at the age of 67.

== Legacy ==
In 1976, Yamashita was the subject of a documentary film, The Crumbling Swamp: Painter Kikuji Yamashita (Kuzureru numa: Gaka Yamashita Kikuji), produced, directed and edited by Shinkichi Noda. In 1986, just before his death, "The Tale of Akebono Village" and other paintings by Yamashita were included in the major international exhibition "Avant-Garde Arts of Japan 1910-1970," held at the Pompidou Center in Paris. In 1996, a major retrospective solo exhibition of Yamashita's works was held at the Kanagawa Prefectural Museum of Modern Art. In 2010, Yamashita's paintings were prominently featured in the documentary film ANPO: Art X War by American documentary filmmaker Linda Hoaglund.
