= Nippon Charge Service =

Nippon Charge Service is a joint venture of Toyota Motor Corporation, Nissan Motor Company, Honda Motor Company, Mitsubishi Motors Corporation and Development Bank of Japan established with the goal of creating a charging network for electric vehicles in Japan.
