= Magical Marine Pixel Maritan =

Japanese manga and media franchise

- Cover of Maritan Intensive Drill: 1st Year (National Edition)
- Genre: Comedy, Satire
- Manga
- Written by: Meteo Hoshizora (as Col. Ayabe)
- Illustrated by: Yukio Hirai
- Published by: Hobby Japan
- Magazine: Monthly Arms Magazine, Chara-no!
- Original run: 2004 – 2009

Magical Marine Pixel Maritan (Japanese: 魔法の海兵隊員ぴくせる☆まりたん; Mahō no Kaiheitai Pikuseru Maritan) is a Japanese manga and mixed-media franchise created by scenario writer Meteo Hoshizora and illustrated by Yukio Hirai. Serialized in Monthly Arms Magazine and published by Hobby Japan, the work is a satirical take on the magical girl genre, featuring characters modeled after various branches of the United States Armed Forces and the Japan Self-Defense Forces (JSDF).

The series gained notoriety for its juxtaposition of moe aesthetics with graphic military profanity. Presented as an English-language learning tool for Japanese speakers, the work is a parody of military culture and international relations.

== Premise and setting ==
The story is set in the "Magic Kingdom of Parris Island," a nation protected by a powerful Marine Corps and a security treaty with the United States. The kingdom's culture is a direct parody of United States Marine Corps lore, with national mottos and religious views derived from drill instructor dialogue popularized in films such as Full Metal Jacket.

== Characters ==
Maritan (まりたん)
Voiced by: Ai Tokunaga
The protagonist and crown princess of Parris Island. A 12-year-old sergeant in the U.S. Marine Corps, she wields a magical anchor called the "Pixel Anchor" and uses an M14 rifle. Her dialogue consists of aggressive English profanity, the literal meaning of which she often does not fully comprehend.
Army-san (あーみーさん)
Voiced by: Tomoko Kaneda
A 13-year-old private in the United States Army. Characterized as a "green card soldier," she serves in the military to obtain U.S. citizenship for her family. She is often depicted as impoverished and hungry, possessing dog-like ears and a tail.
Navy-san (ねいびーさん)
Voiced by: Ayako Kawasumi
A 16-year-old lieutenant commander in the United States Navy. A graduate of the United States Naval Academy, she is portrayed as the most disciplined and rational member of the group.
Jiei-tan (じえいたん)
Voiced by: Mai Kadowaki
An 11-year-old representing the Japan Ground Self-Defense Force. Her design features a heavy chain on her back attached to a book labeled Kenpō (The Constitution), symbolizing the legal restrictions placed on the JSDF. She has the magical ability to transform into sea and air variants.
Tinkle Alice (てぃんくる☆ありす)
Voiced by: Ai Nonaka
A 12-year-old Marine from San Diego. She is a rival to Maritan, though Maritan frequently mocks her name by associating it with urination slang rather than "twinkle."

== Publication history ==
Following its initial serialization, Hobby Japan released several "Intensive Drill" (Shūchū Doriru) books. These volumes combined manga chapters with instructional English listening CDs.

- Maritan Intensive Drill: 1st Year (September 2005)
- Maritan Intensive Drill: 2nd Year (June 2006)
- Maritan English Drill: F*CK Edition (July 2010)

A light novel adaptation written by L.B. Johnson was published under the HJ Bunko imprint in July 2007.

== Cultural analysis and legacy ==
Sociologist Sabine Frühstück identified the series as a significant example of the "moe-fication" of modern militarism. Frühstück argues that the series exemplifies a broader cultural trend in Japan where imagery of childhood innocence is appropriated to "humanize" and "naturalize" military force and international security alliances.

The series' artist, Yukio Hirai, and Hobby Japan were later commissioned by the United States Forces Japan (USFJ) to produce Our Alliance – A Lasting Partnership, an official 2010 propaganda manga celebrating the 50th anniversary of the Treaty of Mutual Cooperation and Security between the United States and Japan. Academic analysis suggests that the "innocent" aesthetic of the Maritan characters was used in these official materials to refashion complex military alliances into a "cuddly, depoliticized" friendship.

During a meeting with Mikhail Kalashnikov, the designer of the AK-47, the author presented him with the series. Kalashnikov reportedly commented, "You shouldn't let children have guns!" before signing a page featuring the character Raidobi-san.

== Merchandising ==
Good Smile Company produced an extensive line of Nendoroid figures for the series, including multiple variants of Pixel Maritan and Jiei-tan, as well as Army-san and Desert Army-san, alongside a set of 1/35th scale character decals.

== See also ==
- Militarism in Japan
