= Tatsuo Ikeda =

Japanese avant-garde artist (1928–2020)

- 池田龍雄
- Born: August 15, 1928
- Died: November 30, 2020 (aged 92)
- Known for: Drawing series
- Notable work: Anti-atomic Bomb
- Style: Avant-garde, Reportage

Tatsuo Ikeda (池田 龍雄, Ikeda Tatsuo; August 15, 1928 – 30 November 2020) was a Japanese avant-garde artist. An active figure in the Japanese postwar art scene, Ikeda’s works adopted a surrealist sensibility deeply grounded in social and political critique. Using strategies of distortion, grotesque figures, biomorphic forms, and a satirical tone, Ikeda sharply engaged with a range of contemporary issues including labor politics and class conflict, Japan-United States relations, nuclear disarmament, and legacies of militarism, especially through the proliferation and continued presence of American military bases on Japanese soil after the end of the Occupation era. A leading figure in the Reportage movement of the 1950s and early 60s, Ikeda, along with artists such as Hiroshi Nakamura, Kikuji Yamashita, and Shigeo Ishii, visited sites of protest across the country to document the realities of postwar social unrest through a expressive mode inflected with both surrealist and realist tenors.

He was involved in a number of prominent but short-lived artistic societies that emerged after the war, including Tarō Okamoto and Kiyoteru Hanada's Zen'ei Bijutsu-kai (Avant-garde Art Study Group, which had its roots in their earlier Yoru no Kai group), Seiki no Kai (Century Society), Seibiren (Youth Artists' Alliance) and the Seisakusha Kondankai (Producers' Workshop), which he co-founded with film critic Senpei Kasu.

Ikeda mostly worked in painting and drawing using earthy monochromatic tones, though later in his career he turned towards mixed-media and sculptural work as well. He is best known for his ink drawing works, which include Anti-Atomic Bomb, Chronicle of Birds and Beasts, and Genealogy of Monsters. His later works, particularly following the Anpo protests in 1960 and their failure to enact social upheaval, turned to more spiritual and cosmological concepts, as evidenced by the biomorphic, embryonic forms expressed in the BRAHMAN series (1973–88).

== Biography ==
=== Early life ===
Ikeda Tatsuo was born in Imari, Saga prefecture on August 15, 1928, as the eldest son of a stonemason. As a young witness to the escalation of imperial aggression and militarist ideology through the 1930s and early 40s, Ikeda's early education was heavily shaped by the nationalist sentiments that colored the atmosphere of the era. After enrolling in Imari Commercial High School in 1941, he was put in a military training course, where he recalled hearing the broadcast of the Imperial Japanese Navy's entrance into war in the Pacific following the bombing of Pearl Harbor.

In 1943, at the age of 15, Ikeda and his classmates were called upon to volunteer to serve in the armed forces. Told to commit on the spot without consulting their families, Ikeda was the first of his class to stand up and volunteer, prompted by a conviction that he would eventually have to serve regardless. He was subsequently drafted into the Imperial Japanese Navy to train as a kamikaze pilot in Kagoshima. Before he was dispatched on a suicide mission, the war came to an end, allowing him to escape the fate that befell his fellow pilots.

The end of the war left Ikeda with a sense of traumatic disillusionment, and he described his sentiments during this period as follows: "Young people had grown up being fed the lesson that sacrifice for the country and becoming a god enshrined at Yasukuni [i.e., dying in the war] was the road to eternal righteousness. We were all hurtling down that road with no time to think. When the road suddenly cut off, it led to great sorrow and confusion.”

After the dismissal of the pilots, Ikeda took a four-day journey from Kasumigaura to Imari. Upon passing through Hiroshima, he recalled seeing an "utterly empty landscape, which felt absolutely horrible. At the time, there was not yet a word for 'atomic bomb', so we had just seen flyers that read 'Enemy drops new type of bomb.'" Ikeda reached Saga in late August 1945, and enrolled in a teaching school later that year after learning that his middle school credentials would be accepted. "I didn't want to be a teacher," Ikeda recalled. "I just wanted to learn, and also not have to pay tuition."

However, after the GHQ prohibited former military personnel from taking teaching positions due to suspicions regarding the potential of lingering militarist sentiments to seep into postwar education practices, Ikeda was expelled from the teaching school in 1946. After working on a base in Sasebo, Nagasaki, a land reclamation project in Imari Bay, and briefly apprenticing at a Nabeshima ware pottery studio, Ikeda resolved to pursue the visual arts, and made his first oil painting, a self-portrait made in the style of Tsune Nakamura’s Portrait of Vasilii Yaroschenko (1920). Ikeda gained admission to the Tama Art and Design School (now Tama Art University) with the painting as part of his portfolio, and moved to Tokyo in 1948 to begin his studies.

=== Move to Tokyo and career beginnings ===
Though he had originally enrolled with the intention of studying oil painting, Ikeda quickly lost interest in academism and instead began to immerse himself in Tokyo's avant-garde circles. Ikeda's classmates at Tama included Hiroshi Katsuragawa and Masahiro Mori. At the invitation of a friend, he joined Tarō Okamoto and Kiyoteru Hanada's Avant-garde Art Study Group, which brought together artists and writers to discuss and debate the paths to developing artistic paradigms that broke free from the clutches of the old militarist order. Ikeda quickly grew disillusioned with the conservatism of the university and his instructors. After seeing a portrait of the imperial crown prince on a ski holiday by Ihara Usaburo, one of his professors, that confirmed his ambivalence about the academy, Ikeda dropped out in late 1948.

The study group was but one of the many collectives (many of which shared members and goals) formed during the early postwar years that sought to redefine creative production amidst a rapidly changing and unstable political milieu, reimagine the social role of creatives, encourage artistic experimentation, and provide publishing and exhibition platforms. As few formal exhibition spaces and sponsoring bodies supporting avant-garde art existed at the time, many artists in early postwar Japan took it upon themselves to organize their own shows. Members of the group included writers Kiichi Sasaki, Kōbō Abe, photographer Shōzō Kitadai, and artists Katsuhiro Yamaguchi and Hideko Fukushima.

Though these groups were short-lived, they provided a crucial intellectual foundation, marked by Marxist and Surrealist influences, that influenced a generation of post-war artists and movements. Younger artists broke off from the groups to form collections such as Jikken Kōbō. Ikeda, who also affiliated with groups such as Seiki no Kai, NON, and Seibiren, participated in a number of organizations independently organized by the groups. Seibiren

His works from the early 1950s, which feature fragmentary geometries and constellated symbols demarcated by strong, dark outlines reveal the influences of Cubism and Surrealism on the young artist’s nascent practice. At the encouragement of Okamoto Taro, Ikeda submitted his work to the second annual Yomiuri Indépendant Exhibition in 1950.

=== Social critique and Reportage ===
The onset of the Korean War in 1950 spurred political fervor among Ikeda and his colleagues, and prompted Ikeda to begin engaging more closely with issues of labor, U.S.-Japan relations, and nuclear terror.

In 1953, Ikeda visited a coal mine near his home in Saga. His observational sketches became the basis for Arm (Ude) (1953), a bold image of a muscular, nude torso, whose ash-covered hand holds a shovel. The figure, whose face is obscured, emerges from a pile of glowing coals, producing an evocative yet unnerving image of the bodily politics of labor. Ikeda went on to visit American military bases in Tachikawa and Uchinada, recording his observations with a critical gaze towards the social, environmental, and political anxieties that plagued residents in occupied areas. Major protests led by citizens, ranging in form from sit-ins to riots (the most visible and violent of these movements being the Sunagawa Struggle) emerged on bases across the country. His 1953 work American Soldier, Child, Barracks depicts a young Japanese woman in the arms of an American GI, looking out the window of a wooden barrack while children play in the adjacent alley, in the path of an oncoming car. Cast with an ominous tenor, the duo embody a common predicament faced by many young women in the postwar, who, after losing male family members to the war, turned to Occupation soldiers for financial support.

Ikeda also explored the conditions and ramifications of postwar urban development through work such as Big Street (Odori) (1954), where he used expressive, child-like hand to draw houses, arrows and stick figures in haphazard array, alluding to the mass development and land reclamation practices that left many at the margins in impoverished living conditions, even a decade after the war.

This insistence on moving out of the studio space and engaging directly with the sociopolitical issues of the postwar milieu would form the core of the methodology driving the Reportage movement. Alongside fellow left-wing artists such as Hiroshi Nakamura, Kikuji Yamashita, and Shigeo Ishii, Ikeda began producing a rich series of protest work that sharply critiqued the conservative cabinet that rose to power following the occupation and the ongoing violence incurred by the perpetuation of American military presence, endemic corruption, and the escalation of the nuclear arms race. Combining elements of both realism and surrealism, the works often mobilize satire, allegorical imagery, and the aesthetics of the grotesque to express in vivid form the perils and anxiety of the postwar social condition.

=== Seisakusha Kondankai (Producers' Workshop) ===
In 1955, Ikeda and film critic Sanpei Kasu formed the Seisakusha Kondankai (Producers' Workshop), which grew out of the dissolution of Seibiren. Seibiren had originally emerged in 1953 as a network of young artists across the country, and the Seisakusha Kondanka continued this tradition, building out a wide-reaching, interdisciplinary collective of young artists, critics, and filmmakers who experimented with the representational possibilities of realism. The artists organized themselves into sections based on the following media: painting, photography, film, and theatre. Ikeda headed the painting group, which included On Kawara, Shigeo Ishii, Kiyoshi Shimamura, and Madokoro Akutagawa Saori. The group held six exhibitions in Kokura, Oita, Shibata, Iwaki, Osaka, and Toyama, citing a desire to bring avant-garde art exhibition and production out of the center and to the periphery. The collaborative work led to Ikeda producing set designs and posters during this period.

=== Anti-Atomic Bomb (Han-genbaku) series ===
In 1954, crew members of the Lucky Dragon #5 tuna trawler were exposed to nuclear fallout from a thermonuclear bomb test conducted by American forces at Bikini Atoll. The ensuing nuclear fallout and radiation poisoning suffered by the fisherman instantly became a flashpoint for anti-nuclear activism across Japan, and inspired Ikeda to begin his Anti-nuclear (Han-genbaku) series the same year. Ikeda's ink drawing 10,000 Count (1954), whose title refers to a Geiger counter reading, depicts the irradiated catch that was recalled at Tsukiji market. Dead, bulging, and contorted, the irradiated fish and humans in the Anti-Nuclear series capture the grim and cruel horrors of nuclear contamination.

In the weeks following news of the events, Ikeda wrote, “I see vividly now the fear the victims on the Lucky Dragon felt towards the hydrogen bombs. It makes the nerves rattle. Invisible needles, riding the wind, mixing with the tide, drifting in and out, killing and decomposing organisms at unexpected times and in unexpected places. These are the ghosts of the 20th century. No, this will end worse than ghosts.”

=== Bakemono no keifu (Genealogy of Monsters), Kinjuu-ki bangai: Masuku dori (Chronicle of Birds and Beasts) series (1955-60) ===
Following the succession of thermonuclear tests in the Pacific and the ongoing rapid industrialization taking place across the country, Ikeda became further disillusioned and unnerved by the pervasive indices of toxicity in the atmosphere and throughout social life. In response, he began working on drawings that explored the grotesque, monstrous dimensions of biological and urban life, organizing his pieces in a typological fashion as if to depict the haunting realities of the observed world through an observational gaze. During this period, Ikeda also began engaging with manga artists from the Dokuritsu Manga-ha group (Independent Manga), and the satirical undertones that appear in his socially critical works from this time reflect the influences of these collaborations.

The works in Genealogy of Monsters and Chronicle of Birds and Beasts shift towards more biomorphic, embryonic forms and phantasmagorical settings from the more symbolic and contextually grounded Han-Genbaku series, presaging his further abstracted and metaphysical representations that would appear in his work from the 1970s through the end of his career.

=== Post-Anpo turn and Brahman series (1973-88) ===
After the failure of the 1970 Anpo protests and the gradual decline of avant-garde and alternative exhibition opportunities in the 1960s (most notably the sudden cancellation of the Yomiuri Indépendant Exhibition in 1964, an annual show in which Ikeda had previously participated), Ikeda began to shift away from overtly political and social themes and turned towards more cosmological, philosophical themes in his work. In 1973, he began to explore ideas surrounding the origins of life and space-time relations through his Brahman series, using an airbrush technique to render his forms with a soft, atmospheric quality.

=== Death ===
Ikeda died from aspiration pneumonia on 30 November 2020 at the age of 92.

== Select exhibitions ==
=== Solo exhibitions ===
- Asobi, tatakau atisto Ikeda Tatsuo [Ikeda Tatsuo, The Artist Who Plays and Fights], Saga Prefectural Museum, 2023
- Tatsuo Ikeda: BRAHMAN, Fergus McCaffrey Gallery, New York, 2022
- Sengo bijutsu no genzaikei: Ikeda Tatsuo-ten—daen gensō [Ikeda Tatsuo: An Elliptical Visionary—The Present Tense of Postwar Art], Nerima Art Museum, 2018
- Ikeda Tatsuo avangyarudo no kiseki [Ikeda Tatsuo: The Trajectory of Postwar Japanese Art] Yamanashi Prefectural Museum, 2010–11
- Ikeda Tatsuo no sekai [The World of Ikeda Tatsuo], Ikeda Museum of 20th Century Art, Itō, 1985

=== Group exhibitions ===
- The Milk of Dreams, 59th Venice Biennale, 2022
- Michael E. Smith & Tatsuo Ikeda, Nonaka Hill Gallery, Los Angeles, 2022
- Surrealism Beyond Borders, Metropolitan Museum of Art, New York, 2021–22
- Tokyo 1955–1970: A New Avant-Garde, Museum of Modern Art, New York, 2012–13
- Avant-Garde Arts of Japan 1910-1970, Centre Pompidou, Paris, 1987
- 1950-nen jidai — sono ankoku to shōbō [The 1950s — Gloom and Shaft of Light], Tokyo Metropolitan Art Museum, 1981
