= Osamu Shimomura (economist) =

Japanese economist

Doctor Osamu Shimomura
- 下村 治
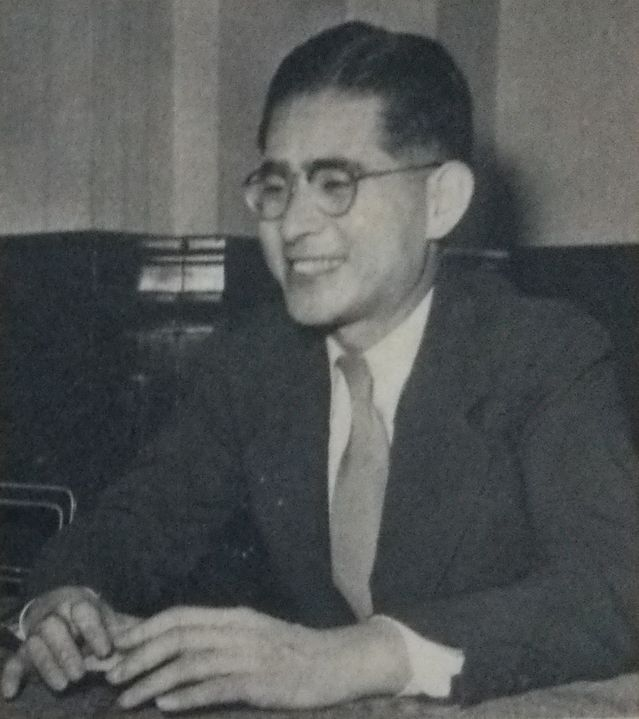
- Shimomura in 1953
- Born: 1910; Kitagawa Village, Saga Prefecture
- Died: November 27, 1989 (aged 78–79)

Academic background
- Education: University of Tokyo; Tohoku University
- Influences: John Maynard Keynes

Academic work
- Discipline: Macroeconomics
- School or tradition: Keynesian economics
- Notable ideas: Shimomurian macroeconomics
- Awards: Second Class Order of the Rising Sun

Osamu Shimomura (下村 治 Shimomura Osamu, 1910 – November 27, 1989), born in Saga Prefecture, Kitagawa Village, was a Japanese economist considered to be the "father of the Japanese economic miracle".

== Biography ==
Upon graduation from the Economics Faculty of Tokyo Imperial University in 1934, he joined the Economic Stabilization Board of Japan until his retirement in 1959. In 1956, he received his Ph.D. in economics from Tohoku University with the doctoral thesis "Multiplier analysis of economic fluctuations." A key advisor to Prime Minister Hayato Ikeda, Shimomura was the primary architect of Ikeda's famous Income Doubling Plan of 1960, and played a central role in economic planning during Ikeda's time in office, helping lay the foundation for Japan's high-speed economic growth during the 1960s. From 1960 to 1966, he served as Director of the National Kimono Fund Corporation, Japan Development Bank Director, and Chairman of the Japanese Economic Research Institute. In 1981, he received the Second Class Order of the Rising Sun. Dr. Shimomura died in 1989.

== Publications ==
- 1952 Economic Fluctuation and Multiplier Analysis (Keizai Hendo no Jyosu Bunseki)
- 1958 Achieving Economic Growth (Keizai Seicho Jitsugen no Tame ni)
- 1961 Basic Problems of Growth Policy (Seicho Seisaku No Kihon Mondai)
- 1962 A Theory of Japanese Economic Growth (Nippon Keizai Seichoron)
- 1963 The Japanese Economy Will Grow (Nippon Keizai wa Seicho suru)
- 1971 Japan's Choices as a Major Economic Power (Keizaitaikoku Nippon no Sentaku) OCLC 551321441
- 1976 Conditions for Escaping from Zero Growth (Zero Seicho Dasshutsu no Jyoken)
- 1981 Discipline and the Japanese Economy (Nippon Keizai no Setsudo)
- 1987 Japan Is Not at Fault (Nippon wa Warukunai)
