= Michiko Kanba =

Japanese communist and Zengakuren activist (1937–1960)

- 樺 美智子
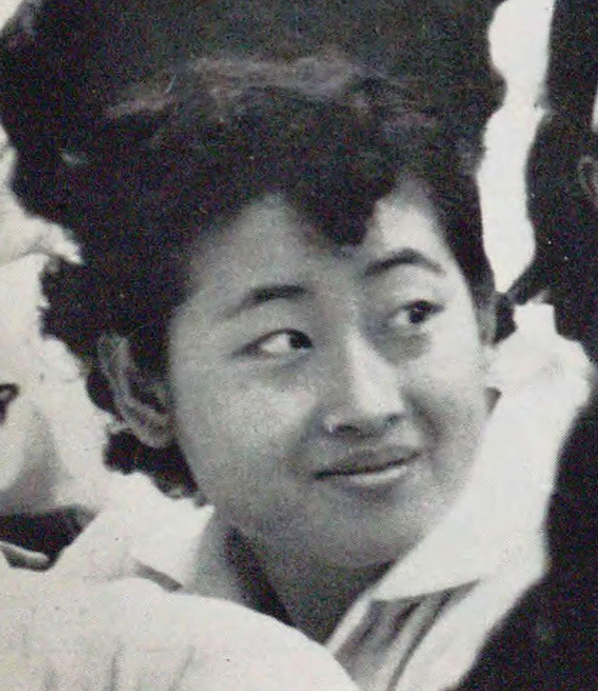
- Born: November 8, 1937; Tokyo, Empire of Japan
- Died: June 15, 1960 (aged 22); National Diet Building, Chiyoda, Tokyo, Japan
- Cause of death: Police brutality or trampling (disputed)
- Known for: The Smile Nobody Knows

Michiko Kanba (Japanese: 樺 美智子; November 8, 1937 – June 15, 1960) was a Japanese communist, University of Tokyo undergraduate and Zengakuren activist. She died in clashes between demonstrators and police at the South Gate of the National Diet Building in central Tokyo at the height of the 1960 Anpo Protests against the US–Japan Security Treaty.

== Activism and writing ==
Michiko Kanba was born in Tokyo. Her father was Toshio Kanba, a sociologist and professor at Chuo University. Kanba was raised in a middle-class Christian household and entered the University of Tokyo in 1957, joining the Japan Communist Party in November of that year. After that, she became a leader in the New Left organization "The Bund" and participated in the massive Anpo protests against the revisions of the Treaty of Mutual Cooperation and Security between the United States and Japan.

Kanba was one of the 76 student activists who were arrested at a January 26, 1960 sit-in at Haneda Airport. She also participated in protests around the Diet Building. She was killed just inside the South Gate of the National Diet Building after a group of students broke into the gate and clashed with riot police. An autopsy later determined that she died from chest compression and intracranial bleeding. Police claim that she was knocked down and trampled to death, while students blamed her death on physical assaults by police officers.

After her death, Kanba's personal writings and political essays were collected and published under the title "The Smile Nobody Knows" [人しれず微笑まん]. In her writings, she discusses her life and activism.

== Legacy ==
Kanba's death was widely covered at the time, and is seen as a symbol of the 1960 mass protests against the revised Treaty of Mutual Cooperation and Security Between the United States and Japan. A political cartoon that ran in the popular journal Sekai a month after Kanba's death depicted a yakuza lighting a cigarette for a policeman as they both stand over her dead body in front of the National Diet Building.

Historian Nick Kapur argues that nationwide shock at Kanba's death helped force the resignation of Prime Minister Nobusuke Kishi and the cancellation of a planned visit to Japan by US President Dwight D. Eisenhower. Kapur says Kanba's death was viewed as a "triple tragedy," first because she was so young, second because she was a student at Japan's most elite university, and third, because she was a woman, at a time when it was still novel for women to participate on the front lines of street protests. Eiji Oguma has contended that Kanba's death evoked recent memories of the many young people who lost their lives in the Second World War. Hiroko Hirakawa framed Kanba's posthumous status as a "maiden martyr" as reflecting contemporary expectations about middle-class femininity and motherhood. Chelsea Szendi Schieder argues that the global 1960s began in Japan with Kanba's death.

Photographer Hiroshi Hamaya captured the events of the night Kanba was killed.

Akiko Esashi wrote a biography in Japanese on Kanba in 2010, under the title Michiko Kanba: Legend of a Sacred Girl [樺美智子ー聖少女伝説].
