= Our Alliance – A Lasting Partnership =

Manga series

- Our Alliance - A Lasting Partnership

永続的パートナーシップ (Eizokuteki Pātonāshippu)

Our Alliance – A Lasting Partnership is a manga series. A collaboration between the United States armed forces in Japan and the creators of Magical Marine Pixel Maritan with artist Yukio Hirai, it commemorates the fiftieth anniversary of the Treaty of Mutual Cooperation and Security between the United States and Japan.

The main characters are a Japanese girl called Anzu Arai and an American boy named Usa-kun, who visits Anzu Arai's family. The children's names are puns on the Japanese pronunciation of "alliance" and the term "USA". The aim of the manga is to educate Japanese people about the alliance, and about why there is a US military base in Japan. CNN notes that despite controversies around the base, the manga presents relations between the two countries extremely positively. The reception of the first issue was "largely positive".
