= Tiger Tateishi =

Japanese artist (1941–1998)

Tiger Tateishi (タイガー立石) (December 20, 1941 - April 17, 1998), pen name of Kōichi Tateishi (Tateishi Kōichi (立石紘一) was a Japanese painter, mangaka, picture book artist, and ceramic artist.

== Biography & personal profile ==
Tateishi was born in the town of Ida in Chikuho (now Tagawa City, Fukuoka Prefecture). He spent his boyhood during the period of postwar reconstruction and rapid economic growth, surrounded by movies and Showa-era songs. He began his artistic activities when he entered Musashino Art University and moved to Tokyo. At first, he worked under his real name and made his debut at the Yomiuri Indépendant Exhibition in 1963.

He formed the Sightseeing Art Research Institute (Kanko Geijutsu Kyokai (観光芸術協会) " with painter Hiroshi Nakamura, and although the group disbanded after only two years, he and Nakamura created an era with their avant-garde style and activities (such as street walking exhibitions in which they held up their own works amidst the crowds). Tateishi in this period is regarded as a pioneer of Japanese pop art.

In 1965, he began writing manga under the pen name Tiger Tateishi and began to write a series of nonsense manga. He left many gag-style works influenced by Fujio Akatsuka, with whom he had a close relationship in both public and private life. His pen name "Tiger" comes from the fact that he was born in the Year of the Tiger, and many of his works of art during his lifetime were based on the tiger motif.

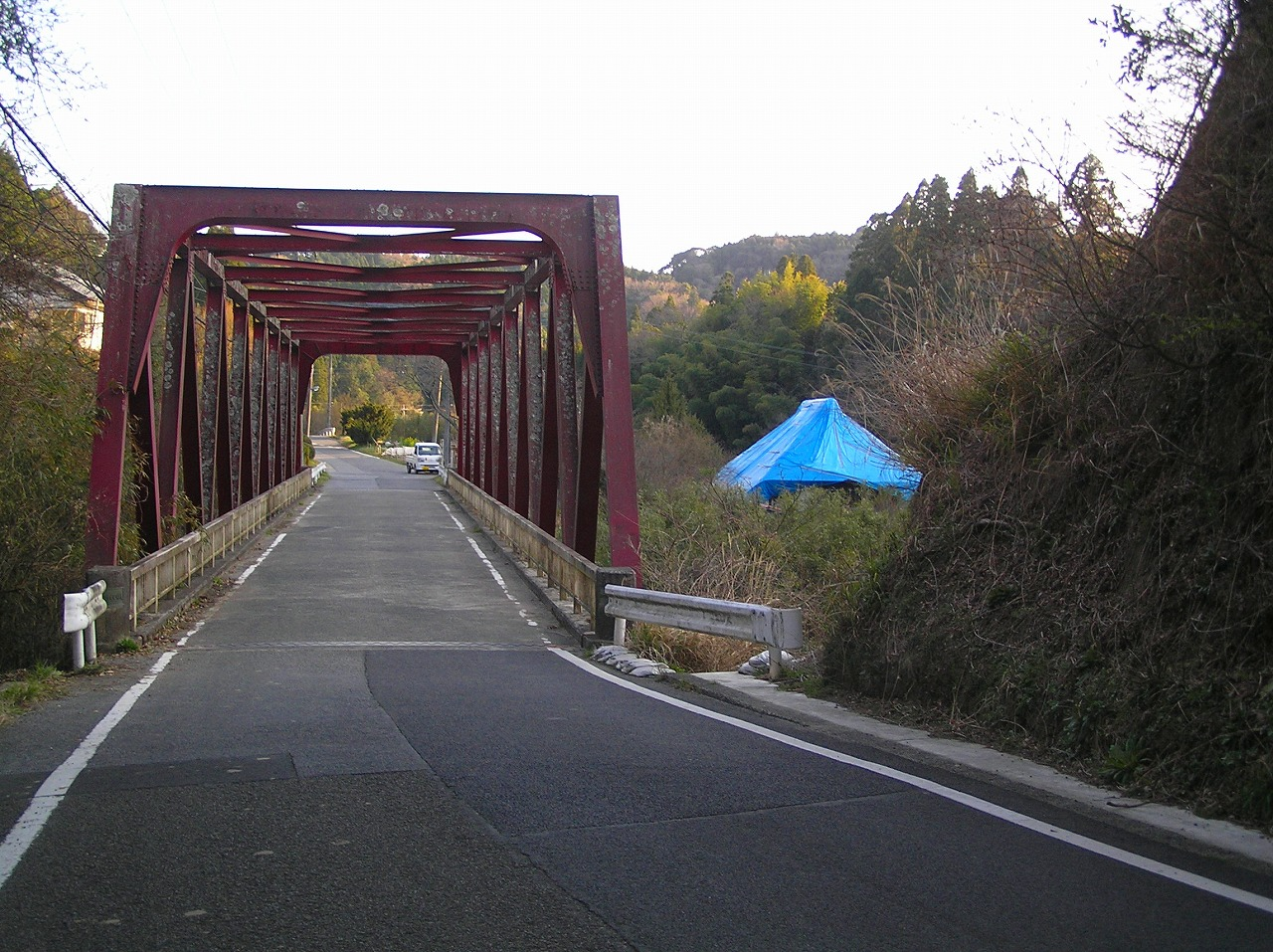
A studio and residence in Yoro Gorge where he moved in 1995 - previously opened as "Meiji Shiryokan" (Meiji Museum of History) by a favorite artist; Yoshiharu Tsuge visited the museum in 1988 and wrote about it in "Poverty Travelogue" (published in 1991).

In March 1969, he and his wife moved to Milan, Italy. Tateishi declared: "A change of environment is what stimulates my creativity." Tateishi's stance, "I refuse to settle down in one place and be satisfied with the status quo," remained his motto until the end of his life. Tateishi lived and worked in Europe for a total of 13 years, including time spent outside of Italy. During this time in Italy, Tateishi presented his panel-split paintings (in which he brought not only the panel layout of manga but also the storyline), and he also gained experience in architecture, design, and illustration, both fine art and commercial. In 1971, he was enrolled at the design institute of Ettore Sottsass under Olivetti.

He returned to Japan in 1982. In 1985, he resumed his activities based in Ichihara, Chiba Prefecture, and published paintings and ceramics under the name Tateishi Taigaa (立石大河亞) and manga and picture books under the name Tiger Tateishi In the 1990s, he started ceramic sculpture and in 1995 moved his studio and residence to Yoro Gorge

In April 1998, he died of lung cancer at the age of 56.
