= Income Doubling Plan =

1960 Japanese economic plan

The Income Doubling Plan (Japanese: 所得倍増計画, Hepburn: Shotoku Baizō Keikaku) was a long-term economic development plan initiated by Japanese prime minister Hayato Ikeda in the fall of 1960. The plan called for doubling the size of Japan's economy in ten years through a combination of tax breaks, targeted investment, an expanded social safety net, and incentives to increase exports and industrial development. To achieve the goal of doubling of the economy in ten years, the plan called for an average annual economic growth rate of 7.2%. In fact, Japan's annual growth averaged more than 10% over the course of the plan, and the economy doubled in size in less than seven years.

== History ==
Ikeda introduced the Income Doubling Plan in response to the massive Anpo protests in 1960 against the US-Japan Security Treaty, as part of an effort to shift Japan's national dialogue away from contentious political struggles toward building a consensus around pursuit of rapid economic growth. However, Ikeda and his brain trust, which most notably included the economist Osamu Shimomura, had been developing the plan since mid-1959.

The Income Doubling Plan focused on public investment such as water, education, transportation, and many other social utilities that were very underfunded, as prior to that focus was on investment in private business. International trade was a part of the plan, and exporter companies were strengthened, and it was made easier for smaller businesses to trade in the international market. The focus on technological innovation was increased which is what led to high quality products being exported all over the world. Farming and agriculture were made more efficient and strategies to account for the influx of people migrating from rural to urban environments were worked on. Social safety nets were created and urban planning to utilize space efficiently were improved.

== Effects ==
The Income Doubling Plan was widely viewed as a success in achieving both its political and economic objectives. According to historian Nick Kapur, the plan "enshrined 'economic growthism' as a sort of secular religion of both the Japanese people and their government, bringing about a circumstance in which both the effectiveness of the government and the worth of the populace came to be measured above all by the annual percentage change in GDP." Various aspects of the plan have been studied by other nations, especially in Asia, hoping to copy Japan's model of export-led rapid economic growth. For example, China in recent years explicitly looked to 1960s Japanese economic policies as a model.
