= Hiroshi Nakamura (artist) =

Japanese artist (1932–2026)

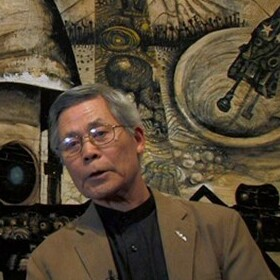
Nakamura appearing in 2011 movie ANPO: Art X War

Sunagawa No.5, oil on plywood, 1955

Hiroshi Nakamura (中村 宏, Nakamura Hiroshi; 20 September 1932 – 8 January 2026) was a Japanese artist who worked in 'reportage' and surrealist styles. Nakamura attended Nihon University and was involved in many artist groups and social movements such as the Zen'ei Bijutsu-kai (Avant-garde Art Society) and the Seinen Bijutsuka Rengō. He is often associated with Reportage Painting, the movement that sought to report on the social issues that arose out of the postwar context by engaging first-hand with the local peoples and their struggles. His Suganaga No. 4 of 1955 exemplifies the concern and style of Reportage that is considered significant. As postwar reconstruction of Japan progressed, Nakamura's interest in Reportage evolved into an interrogation of the artist's role in "viewing" the fundamentals of the political and social realms. Into the 1960s, in collaboration with Kōichi Tateishi, Nakamura devised the concept of Kankō geijutsu (sightseeing art) and, as an extension, he individually developed a painting style centering around trains and female students in uniform situated in an eerie surrealistic dream-like world. Among other influences, he was inspired by Sergei Eisenstein's montage theory and Akira Kurosawa's films which contributed to his signature distortion of perspective that he developed through his career.

== Early life ==
Nakamura began painting in 1953. At the age of nineteen, he left his hometown of Hamamatsu, Shizuoka prefecture and moved to Tabata, Tokyo, where he enrolled in the Asagaya School of Art and Design. After a few months, Nakamura transferred schools to Nihon University to study in the Art Department where he was introduced to the history of the Russian Revolution and the thinking of Karl Marx by fellow students. He subsequently joined the Zengakuren (the All-Japan Federation of Students' Self-Governing Associations) and attended with protests with other activists. As part of his activism, Nakamura also organized a student art group which recruited members from various university art departments. In a similar gesture toward collectivization in art, he also became involved in a painting "circle" of workers at the National Railways facility in Shinagawa. Going once a week to teach basic painting skills, in return he witnessed the lives of the workers and saw parts of the railway facilities that were not open to the public. These experiences fed into his first works within what is called the Reportage movement.

== Reportage and activism ==
Developed in the wake of the war and American reconstruction in Japan during this time, a foundational aspect of what has been called Reportage painting was going to a site to research and observe the social struggles occurring there in order to depict them. Socialist and anti-imperialist in spirit, many of Nakamura's early works of Reportage art, like "Sunagawa No.5" (1955) "Coal Storage" (1955) critiqued the U.S. military presence in Japan. Nakamura had attended the Diego Rivera exhibition at the Tokyo National Museum in 1955, whose influence may be seen in the depiction of workers in these earlier works.

"Sunagawa No.5", perhaps Nakamura's most famous painting, portrays a protest during the Sunagawa Struggle in response to the planned expansion of Tachikawa Airfield. The painting is a two-point perspective scene showing the clashing between Japanese authorities and a coalition of workers, women, buddhist monks, and other protestors. The Japanese authorities, imposing and emotionless, stream rightward from the left-most vanishing point where they confront the protesters at the center of the composition. Streaming leftward from the right-most vanishing point, the protesters are rendered in contrast to the authorities as expressive and determined. Nakamura witnessed this struggle first-hand as a protestor and twenty three-year-old student of Nihon University. The title refers to the site of the protest during the Sunagawa Struggle that Nakamura experienced, with No. 5 being short for 5-chome (the fifth block) of Sunagawa. Conscious of reportage painting's time-sensitivity in its endeavor to mobilize and educate members of the Japanese public, Nakamura completed the painting a few months after returning from the protest. The painting has become known as an exemplary work of Reportage art despite Nakamura's shift in painting style shortly after completing this work.

According to Namiko Kunimoto, Nakamura's 1957 response to the Girard incident marks the last of his socialist realist works. In this same year Nakamura painted "The Base" and "Gunned Down," both of which depict the killing of 46 year old Naka Sakai by a U.S. soldier guarding a military base in Gunma Prefecture. The incident was dubbed the Girard Incident after the name of the soldier and sparked domestic outrage and friction between Japan and America over how to try the America soldier. While these two paintings retain a link to Nakamura's reportage Practice through their depiction of a specific incident of social injustice, they also mark a shift in Nakamura's painting away from reportage style and methods. According to Kunimoto, "Gunned Down" makes a transition from "representing a freight ring political incident to representing the psychological exploration of individual terror, focusing increasingly on montage over veristic figuration." This may be attributed in part to Nakamura's shifting political identity in response to developments in Japan.

== Beyond Reportage ==
In the second half of the 1950s Nakamura's work turned away from the Reportage painting toward what Doryun Chong describes as the "metaphorical and allegorical." This shift in Nakamura's work might also be described as a turn toward montage. This enabled Nakamura to explore a more individual response to social and political phenomena than the public representation of politics seen in his Reportage works.

Many social shifts were occurring in Japan at this time that contributed the new political attitude that Nakamura assumed in his paintings. These include the failure of the anti-Anpo protests in 1960, Japan's economic boom of the 1960s and 70s, and the completion of the Shinkansen coincidental to the 1964 Tokyo Olympics.

This may be demonstrated in Nakamura's trilogy, Period of War (Sensōki), Period of Peace (Heiwaki), and Upheaval (Nairanki), all painted in 1958. In the 1960s, his work took a more surrealist turn, with common motifs being cyclops-like high school girls and technologies of locomotion such as planes and trains. Works like Circular Train A (Telescope Train) (Enka ressha A [Boenkyo ressha]), 1968, showcase the exaggerated perspective of his paintings, with this well-known effect in Nakamura's painting being dubbed the "lens effect."

In addition to his painting practice, Nakamura also made many designs and illustrations for the literary works of his friends. Similarly collaborative, he also made set designs for Butoh creator Tatsumi Hijikata. Nakamura also wrote criticism which was published in the journals Hihyō undō (Criticism movement) and Bijutsu undō (Art movement).

In 1964 Nakamura established the Kankoo Geijutsu Kenkyūjo (Sightseeing Art Research Institute) with Kōichi Tateishi. Together they defined painting as "seeing light," the literal translation of the word "kankō" (観光), meaning "sightseeing" in Japanese. This they saw as the essence of painting, as differentiated from seeing reality and actual objects. The group attempted to insert painting and performances into pedestrian, public settings. A 1964 photograph taken by Minoru Hirata, for example, shows the two in front of a shinkansen, stopped on the elevated tracks of Tokyo Station, holding up two paintings amid the bustle of pedestrian traffic. This was their Promenading-On-The-Street exhibition (Rojō hokō-ten). The group disbanded in 1966.

In 1966 Nakamura was a defense witness for the Model 1,000-Yen-Note-Incident surrounding artist Genpei Akasegawa. During the late 1960s, Nakamura developed his own theory of painting as well, understanding paintings as "tableau machines." As Justin Jesty writes, the "tableau machine" was "a concept that foregrounds the way the painted surface manufactures visual interest and instigates a process of attraction that pulls the viewer in." While this was an outgrowth of capitalism and nationalism's effects on vision, more elementally the tableau machine functioned through eroticism.

== Bigakkō ==
Nakamura was one of the founding teachers at Bigakkō with Natsuyuki Nakanishi. This school was developed with the publisher Gendai Shicho-sha in 1969. Nakamura taught the painting workshop. As Nakamura described, the school was conceived after the stagnation of radical politics in Japan after the failure of 1968 as a means to reimagine political and social practice through art. Within Nakamura's class, the students learned Western painting techniques as antithetical to the Modernism that pervaded Japanese art schools at the time. According to Nakamura, Japan's exposure to Western art in the late 19th century meant that its relation to Western art had been bound up with modernism beginning with Impressionism. This meant that Japanese modern art had not foundation of realism. One of the exercises Nakamura employed to achieve this was a copying of the Mona Lisa in graphite using a pencil with 10 cm-long lead and beginning from her right eye. In another exercise, Nakamura had his students create memory books, a kind of scrap-booking and writing process in which they reflected upon their own experiences. As Yoshiko Shimada notes, "For Nakamura, a painting should come out of the conflict between outside, the political or objective, and inside, the personal and subjective, and establish itself as an autonomous entity independent of even the artist himself."

== Death ==
Nakamura died from pancreatic cancer in Tokyo, on 8 January 2026, at the age of 93.

== Sources ==
- Shimada Yoshiko. "Gendaishichō-sha Bigakkō, 1969–1975," in Anti-academy, by Alice Maude-Roxby, edited by Joan Giroux. Southampton: John Hansard Gallery, 2014.
