= Development Bank of Japan =

Japanese bank

Development Bank of Japan Inc.

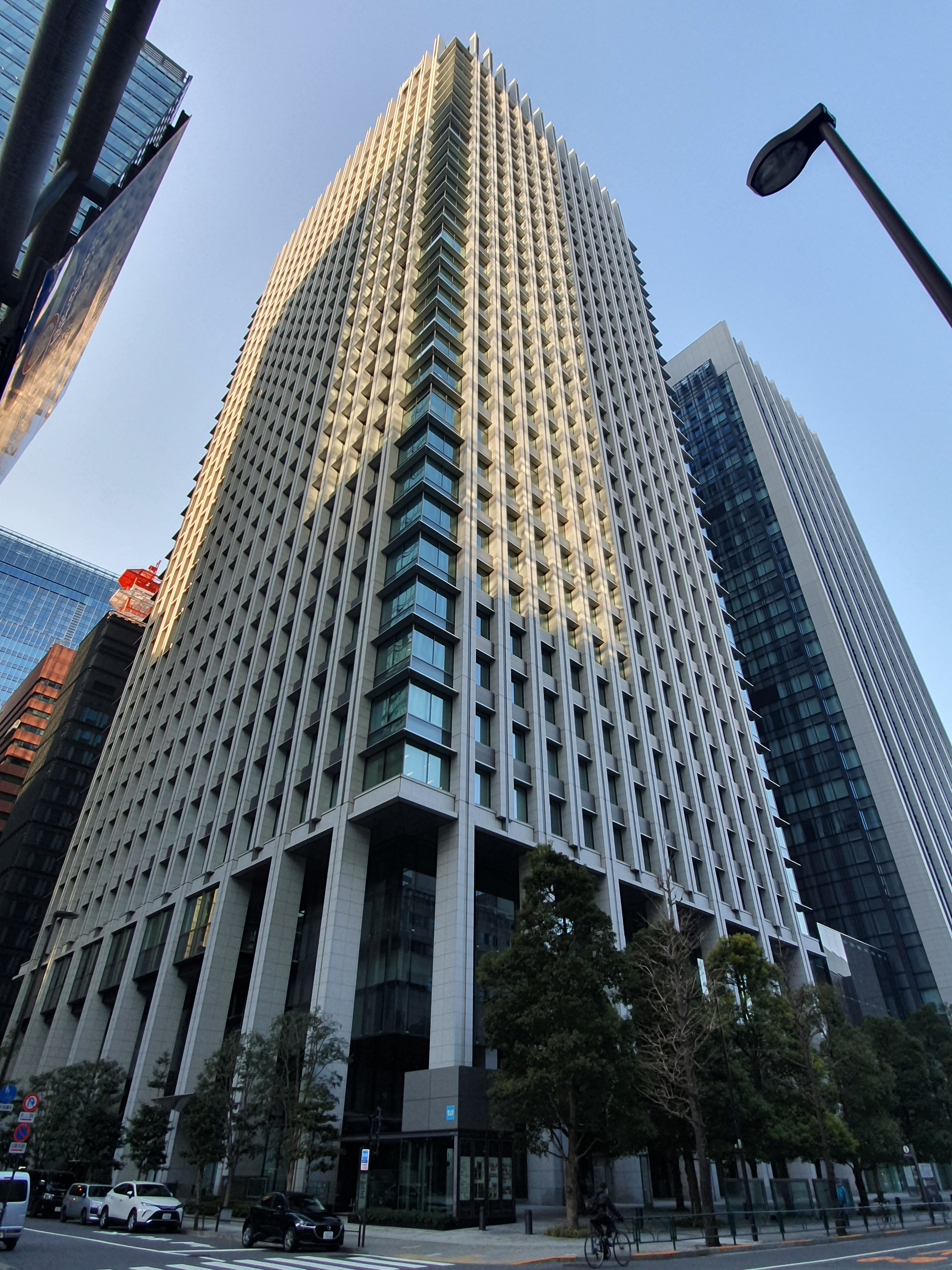
- Otemachi Financial City South Tower
- Native name: 株式会社日本政策投資銀行
- Company type: State-owned (Kabushiki gaisha)
- Industry: Finance
- Predecessor: Development Bank of Japan (est. 1951)
- Founded: 1 October 2008 as Development Bank of Japan Inc.
- Headquarters: Otemachi Financial City South Tower, 9-6, Otemachi 1-chome, Chiyoda-ku, Tokyo, Japan
- Number of locations: 10 Branches; 8 General Offices; 2 Overseas Representative Offices; 1 Overseas Subsidiary
- Key people: Mitsuru Ota (Chairman); Seiji Jige (President)
- Products: Financing Products; Investment Products; Consulting and Advisory Services
- Owner: Japanese Ministry of Finance
- Number of employees: 1,270 (as of 31 March 2023)
- Website: www.dbj.jp/en/index.html

Development Bank of Japan Inc. ("DBJ") (株式会社 日本政策投資銀行, Kabushiki-gaisha Nippon-seisaku-tōshi-ginkō) is a Japanese development bank incorporated on 1 October 2008 under the Development Bank of Japan Inc. Law (Law No. 85 of 2007). Current ownership structure of DBJ is solely owned by the Government of Japan through the Ministry of Finance.

== Overview ==
The Bank provides integrated investment and loan services to domestic and international clients. A large number of the clients are Japanese companies requiring basic investments. DBJ provides most of them at low and flexible interest rates, and so the default rate is very low.

== History ==
- 1947 January: Establishment of Rehabilitation Finance Corporation
- 1951 April: Development Bank of Law established. Consequently, Development Bank of Japan was formed
- 1956 June: Hokkaidō-Tōhoku Development Finance Public Corporation was formed under establishment of Hokkaidō-Tōhoku Development Finance Public Corporation Law (HTDFC Law)
- 1957 June: After amendment of HTDFC Law, Hokkaidō-Tōhoku Development Finance Public Corporation was merged into Development Bank of Japan
- 1999 June: Amended Development Bank of Japan Law established
- 1999 October: Transfer of approval of all rights and responsibilities of Japan Development Bank and Hokkaido-Tohoku Development Finance Public Corporation to the Development Bank of Japan
- 2008 October: Dissolution of the existing Development Bank of Japan and establishment of a new corporation, the Development Bank of Japan Inc.
- 2017: Partnership announced with M&A advisory firm BDA Partners.

== Financial information (at the end of 2008) ==
Total Assets: 14.0174 trillion yen (or US$153.88 billion)
Lending Balance: 12.0266 trillion yen (or US$132.03 billion)
Capital Ratio (BIS): 18.69%
[Exchange Rate: US$1 vs 91.09 yen (on 18 September 2008)]

== See also ==
- List of national development banks
