= Sunagawa Struggle =

Japanese protest movement

Coordinates: 35.72325°N 139.406431°E

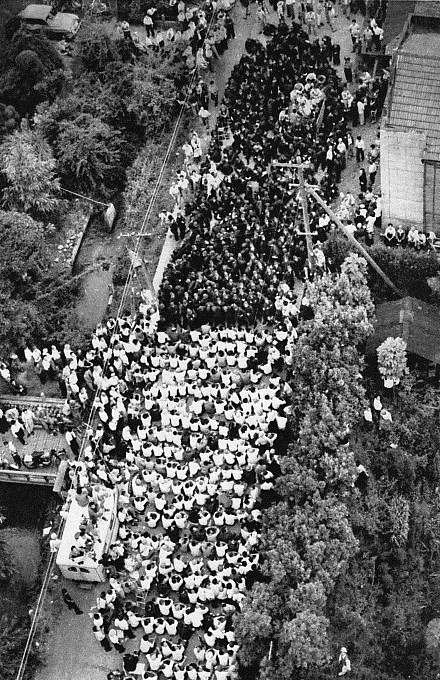
Police (above) being blocked by protestors (below), September 1955

The Sunagawa Struggle (Japanese: 砂川闘争, Hepburn: Sunagawa Tōsō; also written as "Sunakawa") was a protest movement in Japan, starting in 1955 and continuing until 1957, against the expansion of the U.S. Air Force's Tachikawa Air Base into the nearby village of Sunagawa. Taking place at the peak of a growing anti-base movement, "Bloody Sunagawa" is remembered as the most intense and violent of many protests against U.S. military bases in Japan.

== Origins ==
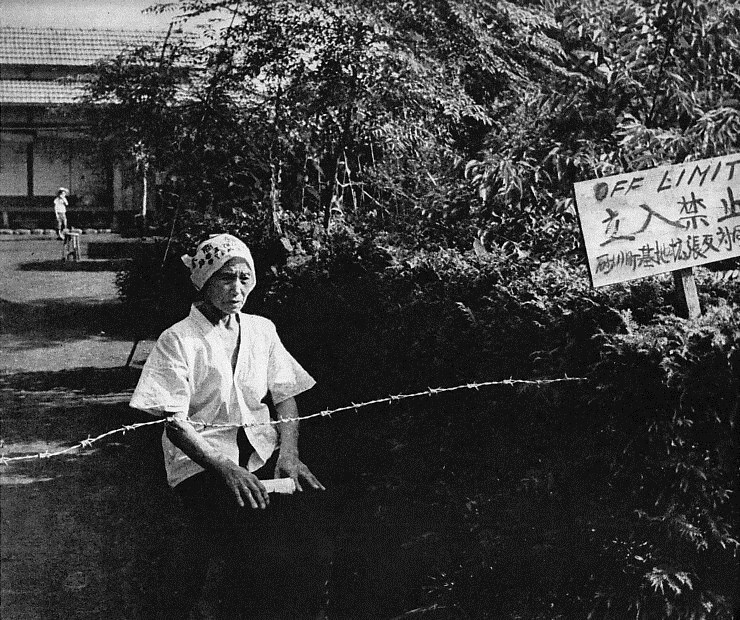
An old woman sitting on her land behind barbed wire, with a sign reading "Off Limits", September 1955

On May 4, 1955, an official from the Tachikawa branch of the Tokyo Procurement Office (調達庁東京, Chōtatsu-chō Tōkyō) approached the mayor of Sunagawa to inform him of plans to expand the runway of the Tachikawa airfield. The U.S. Air Force had deemed the expansion necessary in order for the runway to accommodate larger, jet-powered bombers. The result of an order from officials of the American-occupied base, the expansion plans would have involved the confiscation of farmland and the eviction of 140 families.

Local families formed the Sunagawa Anti-Base Expansion Alliance (砂川基地拡張反対同盟, Sunagawa Kichi Kakuchō Hantai Dōmei) and barricaded their lands against government surveyors and their vehicles. Their struggle attracted the attention of the nationwide anti-base movement, and soon came to include regional and national labor unions affiliated with the left-leaning Sōhyō labor federation, radical student activists from the Zengakuren league of student associations, and Socialist Party members of the Diet.

== Escalation ==
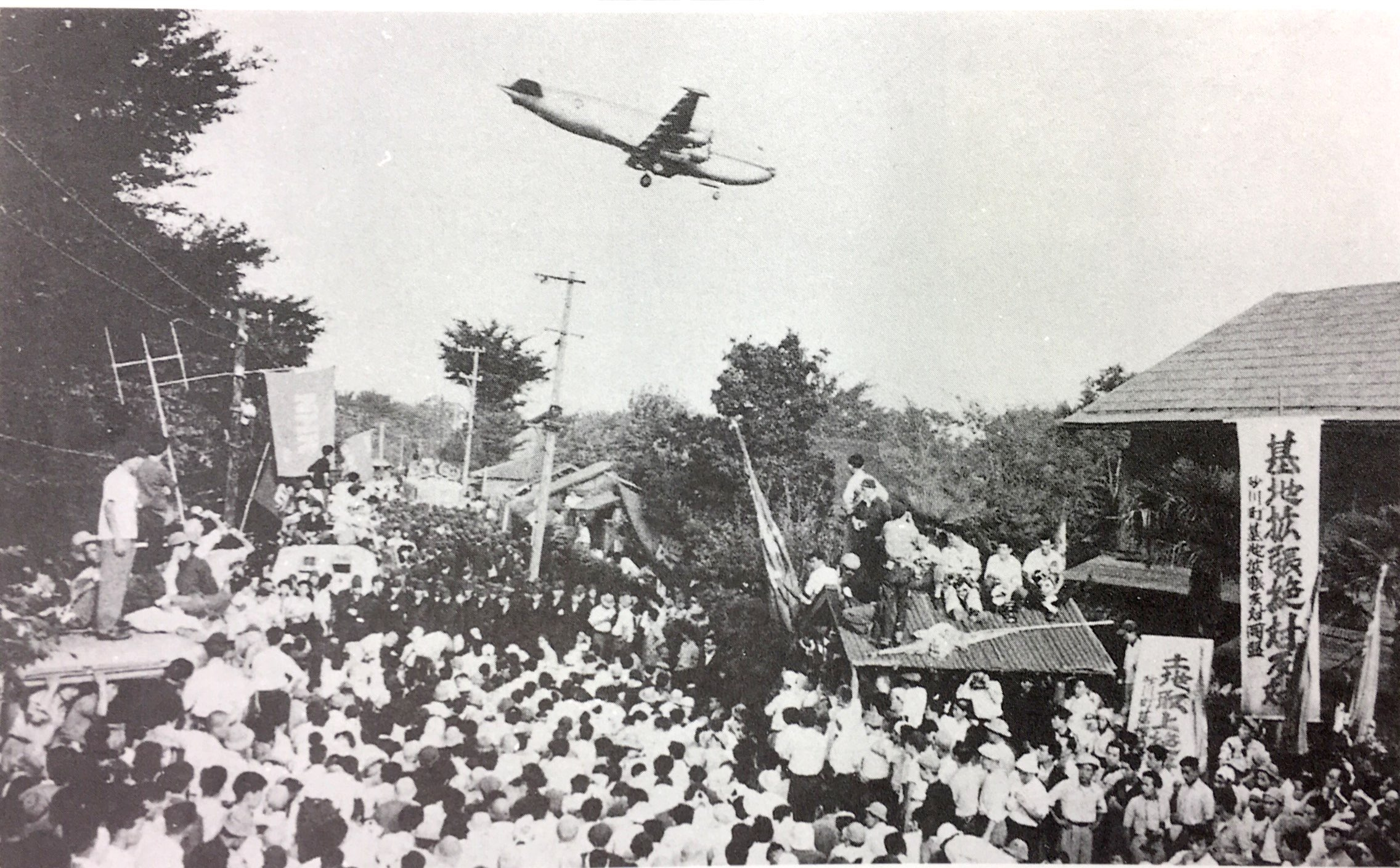
Multitudes of protestors mobilized, with a plane from the nearby airfield visible in the background, October 1956

The struggle escalated dramatically when police were sent in to remove the barricades. Since Sunagawa was very close to Tokyo, Zengakuren began busing in large numbers of students from Tokyo-area universities to bolster the manpower of the farmers. The protests began to take on larger, nationwide implications, rhetorically portrayed as a decisive battle to protect Japan's "Peace Constitution" and resist American imperialism. Soon the struggle became a media spectacle.

Realizing they were in front of television cameras and being covered by daily news, the students of Zengakuren pioneered a new type of protest tactic. Unlike earlier student protesters, who had often armed themselves in clashes with police, the Sunagawa protesters made a point of sitting in unarmed. Wearing white shirts and white headbands to make the blood more visible, they deliberately allowed the police to beat them without resisting. The one-sided violence at Sunagawa proved successful in attracting sympathy to the protesters, leading to more favorable media coverage and further growth of the movement, and earning the struggle the sobriquet "Bloody Sunagawa" (流血の砂川, Ryūketsu no Sunagawa).

== Climax and resolution ==
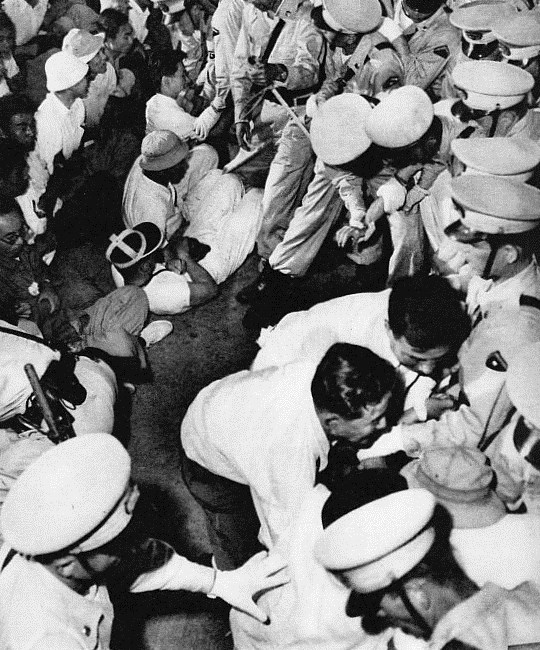
Police attacking protestors, September 1955

The climax of the protests came in October 1956, when two thousand police officers, trying to evict the farmers, attacked six thousand protesters, resulting in a thousand people injured. Despite the violence, however, the police were not able to dislodge the protesters. Due to popular disapproval, the police never mounted such a violent attack again. With the surveyors unable to conduct their work to prepare for the runway expansion, the expansion plans were "indefinitely shelved" in late 1957, after which time the protests died away. For a time, the U.S. military still hoped that the runway expansion might be restarted after some time had passed, forcing the farmers to maintain some of their barricades indefinitely. However, in 1968, the U.S. Air Force officially gave notification to the Japanese government that it had cancelled its expansion plans. In 1977, following the conclusion of the Vietnam War, the US transferred the base to the Japanese Self Defense Forces.

== Impact ==
The Sunagawa case not only resulted the shelving of the runway expansion plans, but also helped convey to both Japanese and American leaders the magnitude of popular antipathy in Japan against US-occupied military bases. In part owing to the bloody spectacle at Sunagawa, the Eisenhower administration in 1957 announced a massive 40 percent drawdown of U.S. troops in Japan, including all ground troops.

Historian Jennifer M. Miller has argued that the Sunagawa protests also convinced the United States to renegotiate the U.S.–Japan Security Treaty on new terms more favorable to Japan. The tactics of unarmed protest pioneered by the Zengakuren students at Sunagawa were used again in the 1960 Anpo Protests against the new, revised Treaty.

=== Dennis Banks ===
Dennis Banks (Ojibwe), an American activist and co-founder of the American Indian Movement, was in the Air Force and stationed at Sunagawa. He later recounted being ordered to "shoot to kill" protesters during the disruption. He cited this experience as a key influence in his decision to organize a number of protest actions against the US government and for American Indian rights in the 1960s and 1970s.

== Sunagawa Case ==
Amidst the protests, on July 8, 1957, in an event known as the Sunagawa Incident (砂川事件, Sunagawa Jiken), some protestors infiltrated the air base. Seven were arrested and charged with trespassing. Their case became a cause célèbre as it found its way through the courts. In the 1959 Sunagawa Case (Sakata v. Japan), the Tokyo District Court initially found the U.S. bases, as well as the entire U.S.–Japan Security Treaty, unconstitutional and fully exonerated the protestors. However, this decision was rapidly overturned by the Japanese Supreme Court.

== See also ==
- Sanrizuka Struggle
- Eminent domain
