= Anpo protests =

Japanese protests against the US-Japan Security Treaty

Anpo protests 安保闘争
- Part of Cold War
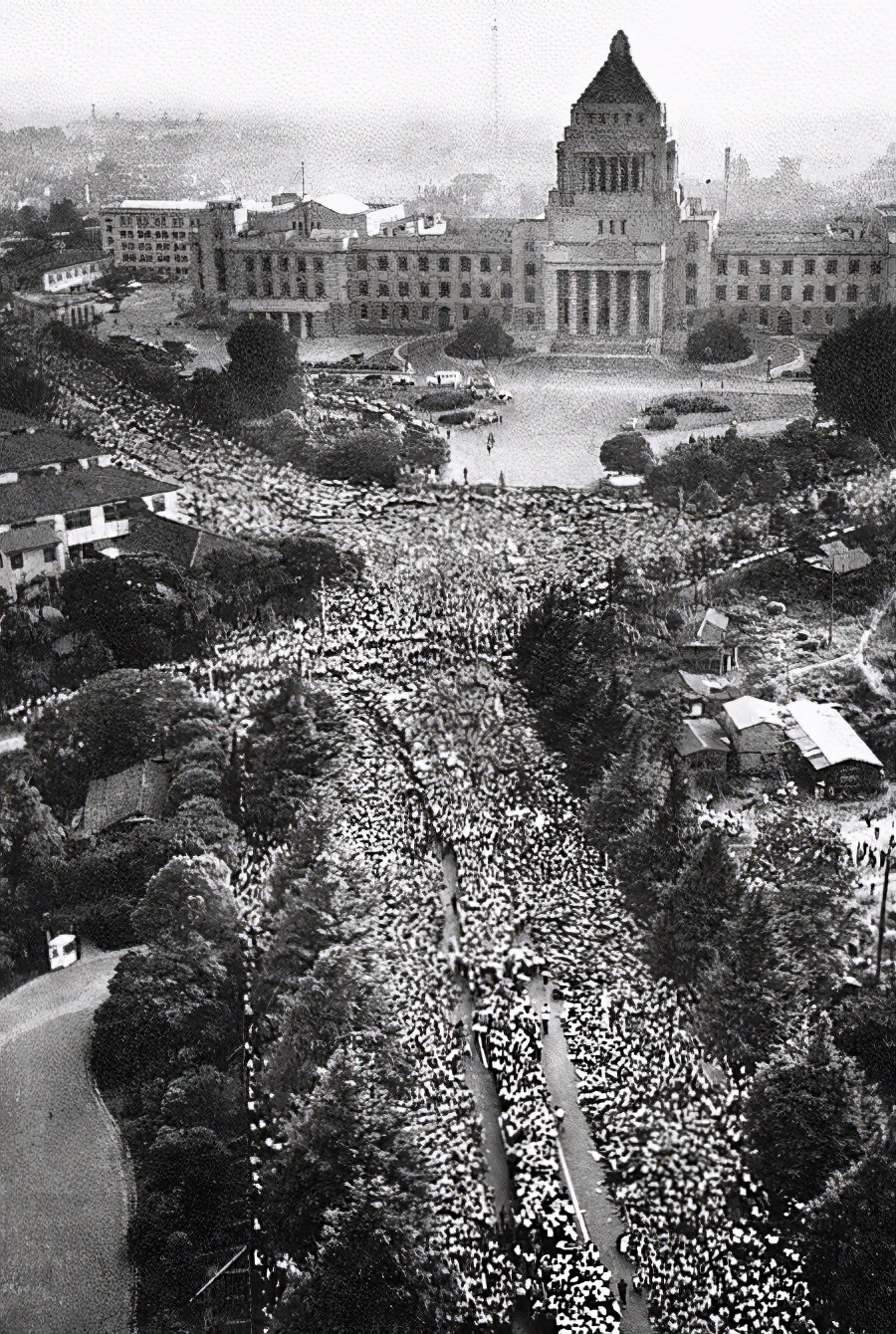
- Masses of protestors flood the streets around Japan's National Diet building, June 18, 1960
- Date: 1959–1960; 1970
- Location: Japan
- Caused by: Opposition to the Treaty of Mutual Cooperation and Security between the United States and Japan and American bases in the country
- Goals: 1959–1960: Prevent ratification of the Treaty of Mutual Cooperation and Security between the United States and Japan; Resignation of Prime Minister Nobusuke Kishi; Cancellation of visit to Japan by US President Dwight D. Eisenhower; 1970: Abrogation of the Treaty of Mutual Cooperation and Security between the United States and Japan
- Concessions: Resignation of Prime Minister Kishi (1960); Cancellation of visit to Japan by Eisenhower (1960); Reversion of Okinawa to Japan (1972)

Parties
(Japan) Anti-treaty protestors; Government of Japan (Anti-treaty factions)	Government of Japan (Pro-treaty factions); Government of the United States; (Japan) Pro-treaty counter-protesters

The Anpo protests, also known as the Anpo struggle (安保闘争, Anpo tōsō) in Japanese, were a series of massive protests throughout Japan from 1959 to 1960, and again in 1970, against the United States–Japan Security Treaty, which allows the United States to maintain military bases on Japanese soil. The name of the protests comes from the Japanese term for "Security Treaty", which is Anzen Hoshō Jōyaku (安全保障条約), or just Anpo (安保) for short.

The protests in 1959 and 1960 were staged in opposition to a 1960 revision of the original 1952 Security Treaty, and eventually grew to become the largest popular protests in Japan's modern era. At the climax of the protests in June 1960, hundreds of thousands of protestors surrounded Japan's National Diet building in Tokyo on nearly a daily basis, and large protests took place in other cities and towns all across Japan.

On June 15, protestors smashed their way into the Diet compound itself, leading to a violent clash with police. During the confrontation, a female Tokyo University student, Michiko Kanba, was killed. In the aftermath of this incident, a planned visit to Japan by United States president Dwight D. Eisenhower was cancelled, and conservative prime minister Nobusuke Kishi was forced to resign.

A second round of protests occurred in 1970 at the time of the 1960 Anpo treaty's automatic renewal. Although shorter in duration, these later protests also achieved significant size.

== Background ==
The original US-Japan Security Treaty had been forced on Japan by the United States as a condition for ending the US military occupation of Japan following the end of World War II. It was signed on September 8, 1951, along with the signing of the San Francisco Peace Treaty, formally ending World War II in Asia. The Security Treaty went into effect on April 28, 1952, in tandem with the end of the occupation of Japan. The original Security Treaty had no specified end date or means of abrogation, allowed US forces stationed in Japan to be used for any purpose without prior consultation with the Japanese government, had a clause specifically authorizing US troops to put down domestic protests in Japan, and did not commit the United States to defend Japan if Japan were attacked by a third party.

The Japanese government began pushing for a revision to the treaty as early as 1952. The Eisenhower administration, however, resisted calls for revision until a growing anti-US military base movement in Japan culminated in the Sunagawa Struggle of 1955–1957, whereby a US Air Force base expanded into a nearby village.

Popular outrage in Japan escalated even further in the aftermath of the Girard Incident of 1957, in which US Army soldier William S. Girard, for his own amusement, fired an empty grenade shell at a housewife salvaging scrap near the military base where he was stationed, and killed her. Girard was convicted of manslaughter along with being subsequently demoted, and the US Supreme Court case Wilson v. Girard. This made animosity towards the status quo even more apparent.

The United States agreed to a revision, negotiations began in 1958, and the new treaty was signed by Eisenhower and Kishi at a ceremony in Washington, DC, on January 19, 1960.

From a Japanese perspective, the new treaty was a significant improvement over the original treaty, committing the United States to defend Japan in an attack, requiring prior consultation with the Japanese government before dispatching US forces based in Japan overseas, removing the clause preauthorizing suppression of domestic disturbances, and specifying an initial 10-year term, after which the treaty could be abrogated by either party with one year's notice.

Because the new treaty was better than the old one, Kishi expected it to be ratified in relatively short order. Accordingly, he invited Eisenhower to visit Japan beginning on June 19, 1960, in part to celebrate the newly ratified treaty. If Eisenhower's visit had proceeded as planned, he would have become the first sitting US president to visit Japan.

== Origins ==
Many on the Japanese left, and some on the right, were united in hoping to chart a more neutral course in the Cold War, and thus hoped to get rid of the treaty and the U.S.–Japan Alliance entirely. Therefore, even though the revised treaty was manifestly superior to the original treaty, these groups decided to oppose ratification of the revised treaty.

Kishi anticipated that such protests might arise, and in the fall of 1958 attempted to pass a "Police Duties Bill" which would have given police in Japan new powers of warrantless search and seizure in order to target protesters ahead of treaty ratification. However, this proved to be a miscalculation, as the law reminded many in Japan of pre-World War II authoritarianism and provoked widespread popular outrage. A nationwide coalition of political and civic organizations coalesced to oppose the Police Bill, and Kishi was forced to withdraw it.

This victory emboldened the protestors, and rather than disbanding, the anti-Police Bill coalition remained active and recruited new member organizations to oppose the revised Security Treaty, which was in the final stages of negotiation. Rebranding itself the People's Council for Preventing Revision of the Security Treaty (Anpo Jōyaku Kaitei Soshi Kokumin Kaigi) in the spring of 1959, the coalition coordinated a series of "united actions" in which thousands of local "joint struggle councils" around the nation would take part in coordinated protest activity on specified days.

== Growth ==
Over the rest of 1959 and into 1960, the protest movement continued to gradually grow larger, especially as heightening Cold War tensions inspired fear that the new treaty would lock Japan into one side of a dangerous global conflict. The April 1960 revolution in Korea that forced US-backed strongman Syngman Rhee from power proved an inspiration to Japanese protesters, as it showed that autocratic governments could be defeated by popular protests, even if they had the backing of the United States.

Then on May 1, the U-2 Incident shattered the amiable "Spirit of Camp David" that had prevailed between the United States and the Soviet Union since Soviet leader Nikita Khrushchev's visit to the United States the previous September. In the aftermath of the incident, the Soviet Union disinvited Eisenhower from his planned visit to the USSR the coming summer and the brief thaw in the Cold War came to an end. It also came to light that some of the U-2 spy planes that were used to surveil the Soviet Union were based at US bases in Japan, further fueling fears that in the case of a nuclear war, Japan might become a target.

== May 19th Incident ==
Meanwhile, in the National Diet the revised treaty faced an arduous path to ratification. Although the opposition Japan Socialist Party (JSP) controlled only about a third of the seats in the Diet, and thus lacked the votes to prevent ratification, the Socialists used a variety of parliamentary tactics to drag out debate, in hopes of preventing ratification before Eisenhower's planned arrival on June 19, and giving the extra-parliamentary protests more time to grow.

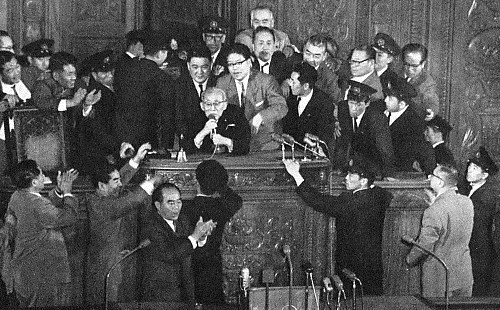
A scrum at the rostrum of the National Diet, as Japan Socialist Party Diet members attempt to prevent Speaker of the Lower House Ichirō Kiyose from calling for a vote on extending the Diet Session, while being restrained by police officers, May 19, 1960

With Eisenhower's visit approaching, Kishi became increasingly anxious to ratify the treaty in time. Moreover, the Diet session was scheduled to end almost a month earlier, on May 26. Late in the evening on May 19, Kishi took the desperate measure of suddenly and unexpectedly calling for a 50-day extension of the Diet session, in defiance of longstanding parliamentary norms and over the opposition of many members of his own ruling Liberal Democratic Party (LDP). When Socialist Diet members staged a sit-in in the halls of the Diet, Kishi took the unprecedented step of calling 500 police officers into the Diet chambers and having opposition lawmakers physically removed from the premises. Thereafter, with only members of his own party present, he passed the extension of the Diet Session. A final shock came after midnight, just after the extension was approved, when Kishi then called for immediate ratification of the treaty. With only members of Kishi's own party present, the revised Security Treaty was approved by the Lower House of the Diet with no debate and only a voice vote. According to Japanese law, if the Upper House failed to vote on the treaty, which seemed highly likely given the political chaos, the treaty would automatically take effect 30 days later on June 19, just in time for Eisenhower's arrival.

Kishi's "anti-democratic" actions during this May 19th Incident (五・一九事件, Go-ichi-kyū jiken) stunned the nation and even much of his own party. Kishi received criticism from across the political spectrum, with even conservative newspapers calling for his resignation. In late May and into June, the anti-Treaty protests greatly increased in size, as many ordinary citizens took to the streets to express their outrage, and the aims of the protests expanded from protesting the Security Treaty to ousting Kishi and "protecting democracy."

Large protests around the National Diet, the US Embassy, and the Prime Minister's Official Residence in Tokyo occurred on a near daily basis, and large-scale protests were staged in city centers all over Japan. In June, the Sōhyō labor federation carried out a series of nationwide general strikes. The June 15 strike involved 6.4 million workers across the country, making it the largest strike in Japan's history.

== Hagerty Incident ==
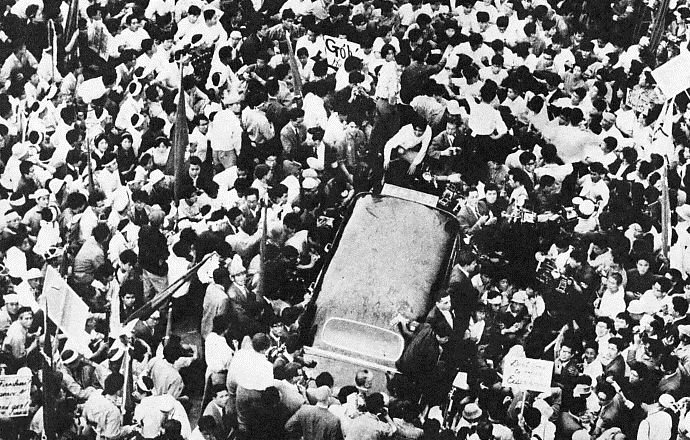
Hagerty's car is mobbed by protestors, June 10, 1960

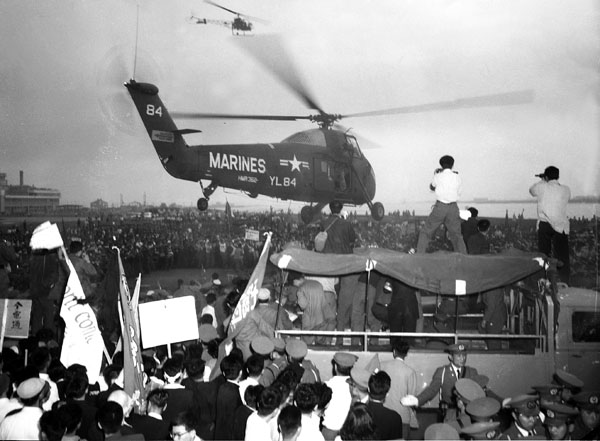
A U.S. Marines helicopter comes to Hagerty's rescue, June 10, 1960

On June 10, Eisenhower's Press Secretary James Hagerty arrived at Tokyo's Haneda Airport to make advance preparations for Eisenhower's impending arrival. Hagerty was picked up in a black car by US Ambassador to Japan Douglas MacArthur II (the nephew of the famous general), who deliberately provoked an international incident by ordering that the car be driven into a large crowd of protesters. The protesters surrounded the car, cracking its windows, smashing its tail lights, and rocking it back and forth for more than an hour while standing on its roof, chanting anti-American slogans and singing protest songs. Ultimately, MacArthur and Hagerty had to be rescued by a US Marines military helicopter, creating indelible imagery of the so-called Hagerty Incident (ハガチー事件, Hagachii jiken) that was transmitted by newswires around the world.

MacArthur had hoped that the image of the car surrounded by protesters would incentivize the Japanese government to crack down harder on the protests. However, his actions backfired by suggesting instead that Eisenhower's safety would be at risk if he continued with his plans to visit Japan.

== June 15th Incident ==
On June 15, as part of the anti-Treaty coalition's 24th united action, hundreds of thousands of protestors marched on the National Diet in Tokyo. In the late afternoon, the protestors were attacked by right-wing ultranationalist counter-protestors, who rammed them with trucks and attacked them with wooden staves spiked with nails, causing dozens of injuries from moderate to severe, including several hospitalizations.

Just a few minutes later, radical left-wing activists from the nationwide student federation Zengakuren smashed their way into the Diet compound itself, precipitating a long battle with police, who beat the unarmed students bloody with their batons in front of mass media reporters and television cameras. The police finally succeeded in clearing the Diet compound after 1 a.m., but in the struggle, a young female Tokyo University student and Zengakuren member named Michiko Kanba was killed.

After this violent June 15th Incident (六・一五事件, Roku-ichi-go jiken), pressure mounted on Kishi to cancel Eisenhower's visit. Kishi hoped to secure the streets for Eisenhower's visit by calling out the Japan Self Defense Forces and tens of thousands of right-wing thugs that would be provided by his friend, the yakuza-affiliated right-wing "fixer" Yoshio Kodama. However, he was talked out of these extreme measures by his cabinet, and thereafter had no choice but to cancel Eisenhower's visit and take responsibility for the chaos by announcing his own resignation on June 16.

On June 17, newspapers across the nation, which had previously supported the protestors in their struggle to oust Kishi, issued a joint editorial condemning violence on both sides and calling for an end to the protest movement. Nevertheless, the largest single day of protests in the entire movement took place on June 18, the day before the treaty would automatically take effect. Hundreds of thousands of protesters surrounded the National Diet, hoping to somehow stop the treaty at the last moment. The protestors remained in place until after midnight, when the treaty automatically took effect.

With the treaty in force and Kishi's resignation becoming official on July 15, the protest movement lost momentum. Although the anti-Treaty coalition held a few more "united actions", turnout was low, and the movement died away.

== Aftermath and consequences ==
The 1960 Anpo protests had ultimately failed to stop the revised US-Japan Security Treaty from taking effect, but they did force the resignation of the Kishi Cabinet and the cancellation of Eisenhower's planned visit. Kishi was succeeded as prime minister by Hayato Ikeda, who took a much more conciliatory stance toward the political opposition, indefinitely shelved Kishi's plans to revise the Japanese Constitution, and announced the Income Doubling Plan to redirect the nation's energies away from contentious political struggles and toward a nationwide drive for rapid economic growth.

The anti-American aspect of the protests and the humiliating cancellation of Eisenhower's visit brought US-Japan relations to their lowest ebb since the end of World War II. However, the incoming administration of President John F. Kennedy responded by taking a more gentle approach to US-Japan relations. Kennedy appointed sympathetic Japan expert and Harvard University professor Edwin O. Reischauer as ambassador to Japan, rather than a career diplomat. He also invited Ikeda to be the first foreign leader to visit the United States in his term in office, and at their 1961 summit, promised Ikeda he would henceforth treat Japan more like a close ally such as Great Britain.

In Japan, the protests spurred a new wave of right-wing activism and violence, including the assassination of Socialist Party chairman Inejirō Asanuma during a televised election debate in the fall of 1960. Asanuma's assassination weakened the JSP, which was further riven by conflicts over the conduct of the anti-Treaty protests, leading to the splitting off of the breakaway Democratic Socialist Party.

The Anpo protests also influenced a series of transformations in Japanese art and literature, as disillusionment with the failure of the protests to stop the treaty led more artists and writers to experiment with new types of artistic and literary forms.

Japanese students who were in college or graduate school between 1960 and 1970 and protested against the Security Treaty are often remembered as the Anpo Generation (安保世代, Anpo sedai), suggesting the defining role the anti-Treaty protests had in their lives. However, the protests had a splintering effect on the student movement, as heated disagreements over who was to blame for the failure to stop the treaty led to infighting. In the immediate aftermath of the protests, the previously unified nationwide Zengakuren student federation disintegrated into numerous warring factions, paving the way for the rise of the radical New Left sects that would play a leading role in the 1968-69 Japanese university protests.

== 1970 Anpo protests ==
Throughout the 1960s, left-wing activists looked forward to the end of the revised treaty's initial 10-year term in 1970 as an opportunity to try to persuade the Japanese government to abrogate the treaty. In 1970, in the wake of the 1968–69 Japanese university protests in Japan, a number of student groups, civic groups, and the anti-Vietnam War organization Beheiren held a series of protest marches against the Security Treaty. However, prime minister Eisaku Satō (who was Kishi's younger brother) opted to ignore the protests completely and allow the treaty to automatically renew.
