= 1945 Katsuyama killing incident =

Killing of three American soldiers by Okinawans

- Part of Rape during the occupation of Japan
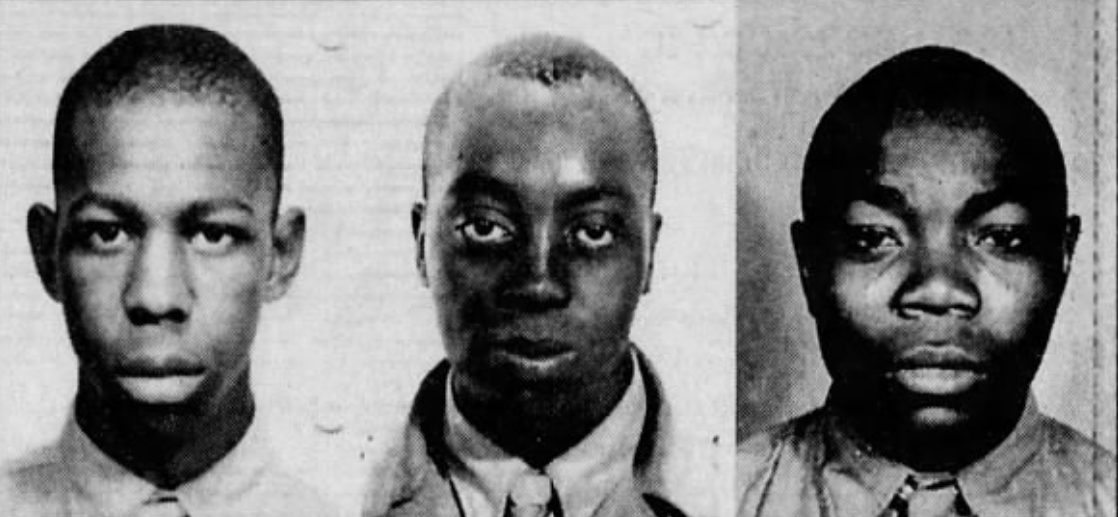
- The Marines killed in the incident, left to right: John M. Smith, Isaac Stokes, and James D. Robinson
- Location: 26.5917°N 127.9775°E; Nago, Okinawa Prefecture, Japan
- Date: 14 July 1945
- Attack type: Vigilantism
- Victims: James D. Robinson, 20; John M. Smith, 19; Isaac Stokes, 19
- Perpetrators: Okinawan civilians and Japanese soldiers
- Motive: To stop rapes

The location of the city of Nago (red) on Okinawa Island into which the village of Katsuyama has since been merged.

On 14 July 1945, three African-American United States Marines were killed by the residents of Katsuyama, Okinawa, Japan. The villagers reportedly killed the three Marines after identifying them as the same Marines who had committed a series of rapes against village women following the Battle of Okinawa and hid their bodies in a nearby cave out of fear for retaliation.

The killings were kept secret by the village until 1997, when a Japanese employee of a nearby U.S. Air Force base was informed about the killings by an anonymous resident. No one was charged as all those involved in the incident had died and the statute of limitations had run out.

== Background ==
In June 1945, Allied victory against Imperial Japan at the major Battle of Okinawa led to the occupation of the highly-strategic Okinawa Islands shortly before the end of the Pacific War.

Shortly after the battle, three U.S. Marines "on an exploratory foray" entered Katsuyama, northwest of the city of Nago, and raped a girl in the village. Villagers described the Marines as "Black Americans" and that one was "as large as a Sumo wrestler". From then on, the Marines returned every Saturday, forcing male villagers to take them to the women, after which the Marines would take them into the nearby hills and rape them. The Marines sometimes entered the village without their weapons, convinced that the residents would not fight back.

== Incident ==
In July 1945, a group of male refugees hiding in the village decided to kill the Marines. With the help of the village men and two armed Imperial Japanese Army soldiers, who were hiding in the nearby jungle, the group planned an ambush outside of Katsuyama. The New York Times interviewed elderly residents of Katsuyama, who described that the Marines were first shot in the narrow and dark part of a mountain pass, then beaten to death by "several dozen" villagers wielding sticks and stones.

Shinsei Higa, who was sixteen at the time, remembers that "I didn't see the actual killing because I was hiding in the mountains above, but I heard five or six gunshots and then a lot of footsteps and commotion. By late afternoon, we came down from the mountains and then everyone knew what had happened."

Afterwards, the male villagers dragged the bodies of the Marines up a steep mountain slope and the jungle, while the women cleaned blood off the rocks. On the mountain, the bodies were hidden in a cave with a 50-foot (15-m) drop-off close to its entrance, which was then sealed with rocks. According to Hiromitsu Yasumura, who was born after the incident and learnt about it from village elders, residents of Katsuyama called the cave "Kuronbō Gama" (黒ん坊がま). In the Okinawan language, Gama refers to a cave. Kuronbō (黒ん坊) is a derogatory and highly offensive word for Black people in Japanese. English sources translate the name as the "Cave of the Negroes" or "black men's cave".

The Marines, who had officially been out on a routine detail, were reported missing on 14 July 1945, though this was later also dated as 14 August. In the summer of 1945, the three Marines were listed as possible deserters, with a reward of $50 (equivalent to $894 in 2025) for their return. A ten-month investigation was undertaken, during which relatives wrote letters to refute the possibility of desertion in December 1945. The Marines were ultimately declared missing in action in June 1946 and considered dead the following month. They were all posthumously awarded with Purple Hearts.

Knowledge of the killings became a village secret for the next 50 years, throughout the duration of the United States Military Government and the United States Civil Administration, continuing after the Ryukyu Islands were returned to Japanese governance. However, the incident was mentioned in the official historical record of Katsuyama, published in 1978 by a local historical society:

Three black American soldiers came into village each Saturday, and it is said they raped the village women. They became reckless. Seeing their chance, a number of refugee men in the village captured the soldiers, killed them, and threw them into a cave. It was a tragic incident.

By 2000, all participants or eyewitnesses in the killings had died, but the story was remembered through oral tradition.

== Discovery ==
In 1997, Setsuko Inafuku (稲福節子), a tour guide for Kadena United States Air Base involved in the search of deceased U.S. servicemen, was informed by a male resident of Katsuyama. The resident, who was too young to remember the incident and remained unnamed in reports, stated that he had a guilty conscience after hearing stories from older villagers talking about the killing of three Marines and the disposal of their bodies. In June 1997, the resident and Inafuku began to search for the cave around Katsuyama, eventually rediscovering the cave in August after a typhoon uprooted a tree that had blocked the entrance.

In September, the two informed local police, who did not report the killings to higher authorities and left the remains in their place for several months to ensure that the male villager remained anonymous. It was thus presented that Inafuku had discovered the cave and the human remains inside by herself in February 1998 while hiking and that she had asked the Katsuyama resident for help. The Katsuyama resident told The Pacific Stars and Stripes of "an incident involving the American marines" in relation to the discovery, but he did not implicate his village in the deaths. After recovery through Okinawa prefectural police, the bodies were handed to U.S. military in April 1998.

=== Identification ===
In April 1999, the three Marines were identified using dental records and the deceased's dog tags. They had all enlisted in 1943 in the United States Marine Corps Reserve, serving as ammunition technicians with the 7th Service Regiment in the segregated 37th Marine Depot Company, who were on Okinawa between 1 April and late September 1945. They were aged 19 to 20.

- Private First Class John M. Smith, born 28 July 1925 in Hayti, Missouri, last residing in Cincinnati.
- Private Isaac Stokes, born 1 October 1925 in Cook County, Illinois, last residing in Chicago.
- Private First Class James D. Robinson, born 9 January 1925 in Savannah, Georgia.

The cause of death could not be determined, but the second-hand statements from villagers indicated that the Marines were killed by stoning. No connection to Katsuyama had been made yet and U.S. authorities, who announced the discovery of only two of the bodies, were investigating their deaths as homicides by either "Japanese agents or anti-American Okinawa nationals".

The bodies of Robinson and Smith were returned to their hometowns, while the body of Stokes, who had no closer surviving family, remained at the Defense POW/MIA Accounting Agency identification laboratory on Joint Base Pearl Harbor–Hickam in Hawaii. Robinson was buried in Lincoln Memorial Cemetery in Savannah on 26 February 2000 while Smith was buried in Oak Hill Cemetery in Springdale, Ohio, on 25 March 2000; both received funerals with full military honors. All three were reburied in the same plot of Arlington National Cemetery on 6 October 2000.

The incident came to wider public attention after the Yomiuri Shimbun published an article on 26 April 2000, connecting the residents of Katsuyama to the discovery of the dead Marines after matching the long-standing local rumours to them. Following this, three additional villagers, who also requested anonymity, corroborated the claims to the press upon inquiry. As a result, officials in Nago were concerned that the story would "mar attention" during the 26th G8 summit summit held in the city in July.

== Aftermath ==
The New York Times wrote that it was not definitively proven whether the three Marines killed by villagers were the same ones responsible for the rapes. The families of the deceased Marines voiced doubt that their relatives were capable of committing rape. The New York Times reached out to contact surviving members of the 37th Marine Depot, but the Montford Point Marine Association stated that none were willing to be interviewed.

Although a probe into the deaths had been announced in April 2000 by the NCIS, officials stated that since the bodies were discovered outside of U.S. jurisdiction, any further investigations were under the jurisdiction of Okinawa law enforcement. Regarding this, prefectural police said that there were no plans for investigation since the 15-year statute of limitation for murder had run out in 1960. A spokesman for the Marine Corps, Joseph Plenzler, clarified that the NCIS had "opened the investigation only to assist in the recovery and identification" and considered the matter closed in May 2000.

The Katsuyama incident renewed discussion about sexual violence by American troops in Okinawa, where thousands of rape cases are suspected, but few reported due to "shame and disgrace". After the reasoning behind the deaths of the Marines was revealed, John G. Castellaw, deputy commander of the Marines in Okinawa, stated that during his 30 year tenure, no accusations of widespread sexual violence had been made.

Though the U.S. military kept no records of wartime rapes, historian Mark Weber has described rape as "one of the most widely ignored crimes of the war... [yet so common that] most Okinawans over age 65 [in 2000] either know or have heard of a woman who was raped in the aftermath of the war". While sex crimes were perpetrated by U.S. servicemen from all ethnic and social backgrounds, author Alastair MacLauchlan wrote that "African American soldiers (probably from a troubled social background) appear to have gained the worst reputation".

The incident has been seen by opponents of U.S. military presence in Okinawa as one of many examples of misconduct by American personnel against Okinawans since the islands were first occupied after the Battle of Okinawa in 1945. Steve Rabson, Professor of East Asian Studies at Brown University, estimated that as many as 10,000 such instances of rape occurred after the war. Women's rights activist Takazato Suzuyu compiled several instances of rapes committed by American servicemen post-war, but the U.S. military were unwilling to acknowledge the accounts, as most were from indirect sources, with surviving victims having never pressed charges, while also remaining unwilling to testify about the rapes in court.

Under the U.S.-Japan Security Treaty, the United States Forces Japan has maintained a large military presence in Okinawa: 27,000 personnel, including 15,000 Marines, contingents from the Army, United States Navy, United States Air Force, and their 22,000 family members.

== See also ==
- 1955 Yumiko-chan incident
- 1995 Okinawa rape incident
- 2002 Okinawa Michael Brown assault incident
- Murder of Yoshie Sato
- 2008 Yokosuka homicide
- Rape during the occupation of Japan
- Sexual assault in the U.S. military
- Hercules (serial killer)
