= Yumiko-chan incident =

Rape and murder of five-year-old Japanese girl by U.S. soldier

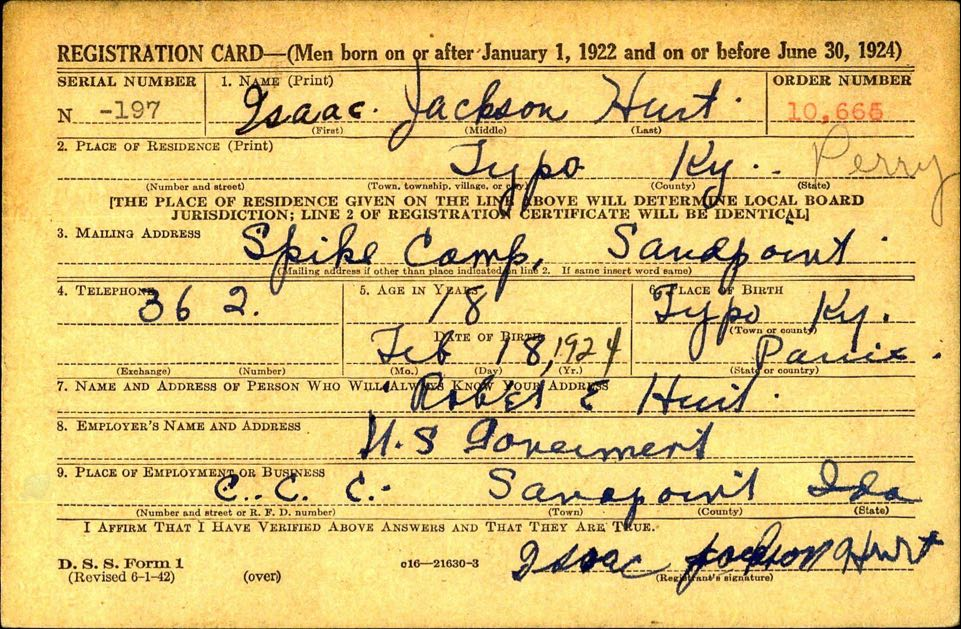
The World War II draft card of Isaac J. Hurt, the U.S. soldier found guilty for the rape and murder of 5-year old Yumiko Nagayama on Okinawa, 1955.

The Yumiko-chan incident (Japanese: 由美子ちゃん事件) was the rape and murder of five-year-old Japanese girl Yumiko Nagayama, sometimes reported as Yumiko Arakaki, by U.S. soldier ‌Sergeant Isaac J. Hurt in Kadena, Okinawa, on 4 September 1955. Nagayama's body was found near Kadena Air Base during the U.S. occupation of Okinawa. An investigation led to the conviction of 31-year-old Sergeant Hurt on charges of murder, rape, and kidnapping. The Yumiko-chan incident caused anti-American outrage in Okinawa and contributed to the first major Okinawan protests against the U.S. occupation and military presence.

== Background ==
Hurt, who was born in Lothair, Kentucky, had previously served 11 months in jail for assault and attempted rape in Michigan.

Isaac Jackson Hurt
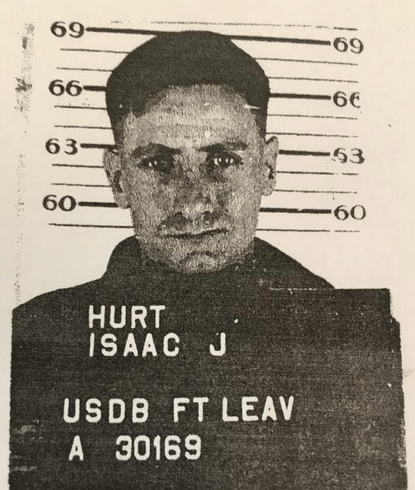
- Born: 18 February 1924; Lothair, Kentucky, U.S.
- Died: 6 August 1984 (aged 60); Cincinnati, Ohio, U.S.
- Spouse: Lura Bea McKinney (married 1981)
- Status: Deceased
- Convictions: Military; Felony murder Rape; Michigan; Attempted rape Assault
- Penalty: Military; Death; commuted to 45 years imprisonment without parole; further commuted to permit parole eligibility Michigan; 11 months imprisonment

Details
- Victims: Yumiko Nagayama, 5
- Date: 4 September 1955
- Country: Japan
- State: Okinawa
- Weapon: Knife

== Incident ==
On 4 September 1955, the mutilated body of a young girl was discovered in a landfill belonging to the Kadena Air Base, an installation of the Far East Command in Kadena, Okinawa, at the time governed by the United States Civil Administration of the Ryukyu Islands. The girl was found to have been raped and her body was described as if it had been cut up with a sharp knife from the abdominal region to the bowel.

The girl was identified as Yumiko Nagayama, sometimes reported as Yumiko Arakaki, a five-year-old kindergarten student from Ishikawa, now part of the city of Uruma. She had been reported missing at about 8 p.m when she did not come home from playing outdoors. When a brown hair was discovered on Nagayama's body, investigators suspected that the perpetrator was foreign, prompting a joint investigation by the U.S. military and the Ryukyu Police, the civilian police agency in Okinawa at the time.

The investigation suggested that Nagayama was abducted at an Eisa performance where eyewitnesses claimed to have seen her leave with a White man, indicating that the perpetrator was a U.S. serviceman. An indictment was submitted against Sergeant Isaac J. Hurt, sometimes incorrectly reported as Isaac J. Hart, of B Battalion, 32nd Artillery Division, on charges of murder, rape and kidnapping.

== Reaction ==
News of Nagayama's violent rape and murder by a U.S. serviceman provoked outrage among Okinawans, who were further angered by the fact that due to extraterritoriality laws, Hurt's murder would not be tried by an Okinawan court, but rather an American military court. A Rally for Protection of Children was held in Okinawa and the Association for Protection of Children was formed with this incident, and many Okinawans rallied in support of the cause.

Okinawans demanded that the U.S. military "Punish offenders of this kind of case with the death penalty without leniency regardless of nationality or ethnicity." Okinawans demanded for the U.S. to have Hurt tried in a civilian court and that the trial be publicly broadcast, but these requests were declined.

== Trial ==
Hurt was court-martialed on charges of rape and felony murder by an American military court in Okinawa. He was tried just 15 days after U.S. Marine Raymond Elton Parker was sentenced to life in prison for raping a 7-year-old Okinawan girl. Hurt insisted on his innocence. His court martial lasted 13 days and he was convicted after a deliberation of less than an hour, and sentenced to death. While it was standard procedure, Hurt was returned to the U.S. without the Okinawan public being informed. After sentencing, people from his hometown and a number of politicians jumped to his defense.

The defense presented letters and petitions from Hurt's hometown of Lothair, which described him as "honest" and "law abiding". Military prosecutors rejected this, citing Hurt's prior convictions.

Representative Carl D. Perkins discussed concerns from his district where Hurt "comes from" that "something could be done about" the death sentence. Senator Thruston Ballard Morton urged a commutation, saying "The conviction rests upon circumstantial evidence and there exists some doubt concerning the guilt or innocence of the accused." Senator John Sherman Cooper pleaded for the case to be reviewed more carefully. Then Senate Majority Leader Lyndon B. Johnson and Senator Ralph Yarborough asked a law firm to help with Hurt's appeals.

In May 1959, U.S. Army Secretary Wilber M. Brucker recommended that Hurt's death sentence be carried out. "I have studied this case carefully," he said. "And I am convinced of the guilt of the accused." Among the factors which led Brucker to conclude that Hurt was guilty were his prior convictions for assault and attempted rape and the falsification of his enlistment papers in 1942 when he concealed his criminal record. However, in response to increasing pressure, Hurt's sentence was reduced to 45 years in prison without the possibility of parole by President Dwight D. Eisenhower in 1960.

=== Release from prison ===
Following the commutation of his death sentence, Hurt was transferred to United States Penitentiary in Leavenworth, Kansas, where he suffered a stroke in 1969. He wrote letters to Senators and members of the U.S. government requesting to be granted parole or his case to be dismissed. In one letter, he alleged, "I was sacrificed to appease the dissident political elements who were demanding an end to American mil. [military] Occupation."

In January 1977, President Gerald Ford modified the sentences of six former military death row inmates, including Hurt, to make them eligible for parole. Hurt was released from prison later that year. Following his release, he found work as a night watchman and married Lura Bea McKinney in 1981. On 6 August 1984, Hurt died at a Department of Veterans Affairs hospital in Ohio State. His grave in Reading Cemetery, Hamilton County, Ohio State, is marked with a headstone, provided by the Department of Veterans' Affairs, noting his service in World War II.

== Aftermath ==
The Yumiko-chan incident caused an increase in Okinawan opposition against the United States Civil Administration of the Ryukyu Islands and ten years of U.S. military occupation in Okinawa, and led to further debate over the continued presence of U.S. forces in Japan. It was the springboard for the first serious, coordinated anti-U.S. military protests in Okinawa following the beginning of the occupation in 1945.

On 23 September 2021, Okinawa Times reported about the release of Hurt and the Department of Veterans' Affairs' provision of his grave marker, despite his conviction for rape and murder of a minor. Okinawan peace activists, including Suzuyo Takazato, expressed anger at the release and the U.S. government's decision to supply such a headstone.

== See also ==
- Rape during the occupation of Japan
- 1945 Katsuyama killing incident
- 1995 Okinawa rape incident
- 2002 Okinawa Michael Brown incident
- 2006 Yokosuka homicide
- 2008 Yokosuka homicide

General:

- Sexual assault in the U.S. military
