= Michael Brown Okinawa assault incident =

2002 attempted indecent assault by a U.S. Marine

- Date: November 2, 2002
- Location: Okinawa, Japan
- Type: Attempted indecent assault
- Arrests: 1 (Michael Brown)
- Suspects: 1 (Michael Brown)
- Charges: Attempted rape, destruction of private property
- Convictions: Attempted indecent assault, destruction of private property

On November 2, 2002, U.S. Marine Corps Major Michael Brown attempted an indecent assault on a Filipina bartender in Okinawa, Japan. The bartender accused Brown of attempting to rape her and of throwing her cell phone into a nearby river; Brown denied the rape charges. The victim later recanted and attempted to withdraw the accusation, though prosecutors presented evidence that she had received a cash payment just before doing so.

The case received extensive attention in the Japanese media, especially in Okinawa, and the crime sparked a public debate over the U.S. military presence in Japan, the privileges of extraterritoriality, as well as the fair-trial practices of Japanese legal system and the Japanese police. The case involved the Treaty of Mutual Cooperation and Security Between the United States and Japan and the U.S.–Japan Status of Forces Agreement (SOFA).

On July 8, 2004, after a 19-month trial, Brown was convicted by a Japanese court of attempted indecent assault and destruction of private property and received a one-year suspended prison sentence. As a result of this incident and others involving crimes committed by U.S. military personnel in Japan, both countries entered into negotiations aimed at modifying the SOFA in July 2003. Ultimately, no changes were made to the agreement. In 2005, Brown was arrested and charged with a separate kidnapping in the United States. He was demoted and involuntarily retired from the military in 2006 and at his trial in 2009 entered an Alford plea, receiving probation on the felony conviction.

== Crime and arrest ==
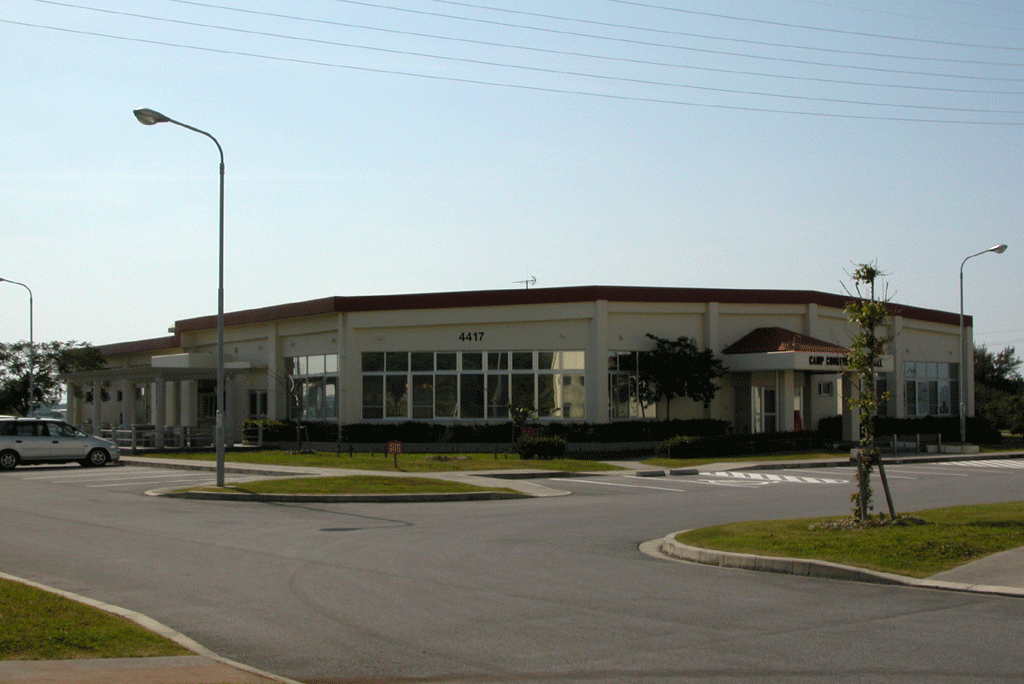
Camp Courtney Mess Hall

Early in the morning of November 2, 2002, a female employee of the Camp Courtney officers' club on Okinawa drove up to the Courtney main gate and reported to base security personnel that a Marine Corps major had just attempted to sexually assault her in her car on a deserted road near the back gate of the base. She identified the Marine as Major Michael Brown and stated that during the assault the major threw her mobile phone into the nearby Tengan River.

The woman, later identified as Victoria Nakamine, was 40 years old, and originally from the Philippines. She had lived in Okinawa for 17 years, and was married to a Japanese citizen of Okinawan descent. She reported that she had picked up Brown in her car about 1:30 a.m. after the officers' club closed and that he directed her to the deserted road behind the base and after parking, Brown tried to rape her and then threw her mobile phone into the river when she tried to call the police. The Camp Courtney security personnel called the Japanese National Police Agency (NPA). Japanese officers came and took Nakamine's report.

Michael Brown was at the time 39 years old, was married, had two small children, and was a 19-year Marine veteran assigned to the command element of the III Marine Expeditionary Force at Camp Courtney on his second tour on Okinawa. Brown voluntarily underwent several hours of questioning at the JNP station in Gushikawa. He told Japanese police investigators that Nakamine had propositioned him for sex and that, when he refused, a physical altercation ensued.

During the altercation, Brown said, Nakamine took his wallet and Brown grabbed her mobile phone, which he, "out of frustration", proceeded to toss into the nearby river. Brown stated that Nakamine drove away but returned a few minutes later and gave his wallet back to him. Both Brown's and Nakamine's accounts agreed that Nakamine had originally picked up Brown in her car after meeting him for the first time at the base officers' club that evening. Both stated that Nakamine had agreed to give Brown, who was intoxicated, a ride home.

On December 3, 2002, the JNP issued a warrant for Brown's arrest. The Japanese government asked that Brown be turned over to Japanese authorities immediately. Although the U.S.–Japan Status of Forces Agreement stated that service members would only be turned over to Japanese law enforcement if formally indicted, the U.S. had agreed to give "sympathetic consideration" for serious crimes in response to the 1995 Okinawan rape incident, in which a U.S. Navy sailor and two Marines raped a 12-year-old Okinawan girl.

The United States, in this case, decided not to turn Brown over to the Japanese authorities before he was formally indicted and restricted Brown to base on Camp Courtney. On December 9, the JNP filed formal charges against Brown and, on December 19, he was formally indicted on charges of attempted rape and destruction of private property. The next day, Brown, escorted by U.S. Marine Corps military police, was turned over to the custody of Japanese police at the Naha detention center. When asked why they had waited ten days after the formal charges to indict Brown, Japanese Deputy Chief Prosecutor Junichi Okumura stated that they wanted to give Brown a chance to apologize (called jidan in Japanese) to the victim. Since that apparently did not occur and Nakamine still expressed a desire to press charges, the Japanese authorities went ahead with the indictment.

On December 25, Naha District Court judge Yayoi Ikeda (池田 弥生, Ikeda Yayoi) denied bail for Brown because, "there was concern that he [Brown] might try to destroy evidence or intimidate witnesses if he was set free." Ikeda also said that she was concerned over the seriousness of the charges and the large discrepancy between the statements of Brown and Nakamine. Brown was represented at the hearing by a local Japanese defense attorney, Masayuki Akamine (赤嶺 允之, Akamine Masayuki). Akamine reported that Brown's family in the United States had begun jidan negotiations with the victim. At this time, Brown's brother also launched a website to protest Brown's detention and to complain about what he perceived to be unfair treatment of Brown by the Japanese courts. Brown later reported that Japanese prison officials "admonished" him over the launching of the protest website by his family.

On January 9, 2003, bail was denied for Brown by the same judge for a second time. Brown then appealed the bail decision to a three-judge panel of the Naha court who upheld the denial of bail on January 16. The Naha court scheduled Brown's trial to begin on March 13, but later changed the date to May 26 because of delays incurred by legal motions filed by Brown's attorneys. The trial was expected to last for some time because, under the procedures of the Japanese justice system, trial hearings are usually only conducted for one or two days a month.

== Pre-trial ==
On January 24, Brown hired two new defense attorneys, Michael Griffith and Toshimitsu Takaesu. Griffith was a New York City attorney who had previously represented Marines in Okinawa. Takaesu was a former Okinawa chief prosecutor. Both were described as "outspoken critics of Japan's legal system". The first week of March, another attorney hired by Brown filed a habeas corpus petition with the United States District Court for the District of Columbia claiming that the legality of Brown's incarceration was open to question due to what Brown claimed was the inherent unfairness of the Japanese judicial system. The U.S. court dismissed the motion on March 12, citing jurisdictional issues.

Throughout the trial, Brown wrote numerous public missives about what he felt was the unfairness and corruption of the Japanese justice system and accusing the local Okinawan government of pursuing a political agenda in the prosecution of his case. Brown's letters were posted on his family's website and informally distributed throughout Okinawa's U.S. military population. Brown and his family also wrote many letters to U.S. politicians and government officials complaining of Brown's treatment by Japanese authorities and actively encouraged other U.S. military members and U.S. citizens to do the same.

On March 13, an Okinawan newspaper reported that the JNP had matched DNA taken from saliva on the victim's upper body with DNA in a blood sample obtained from Brown during the investigation. Brown was again denied bail on March 17. Takaesu blamed the anonymous report about the DNA evidence in the newspaper as the reason for the bail denial and criticized the Naha District Prosecutor's Office for not including the DNA evidence in the evidence list submitted before the trial was scheduled to begin. In reply, Junichi Okumura, a Naha District deputy chief prosecutor stated, "Here in Japan, unlike the United States, there is no problem if evidence is submitted later". Brown was granted a ¥10 million bail (approximately US$100,000, c.2003) by the Naha court on May 13 but he was restricted to Camp Courtney for the duration of the trial.

Brown's family hired Gene Warfield, an American ex-special forces soldier who had lived in Okinawa for 17 years, as a consultant to assist them in "looking into the allegations levied against Michael [Brown]". On the evening of May 7, as Warfield, his Japanese wife, and daughter arrived at a restaurant on Okinawa, a man attacked Warfield with a knife, injuring him slightly. Warfield described the man's attack as "professional". The JNP investigated, but no arrests were made.

== Trial ==
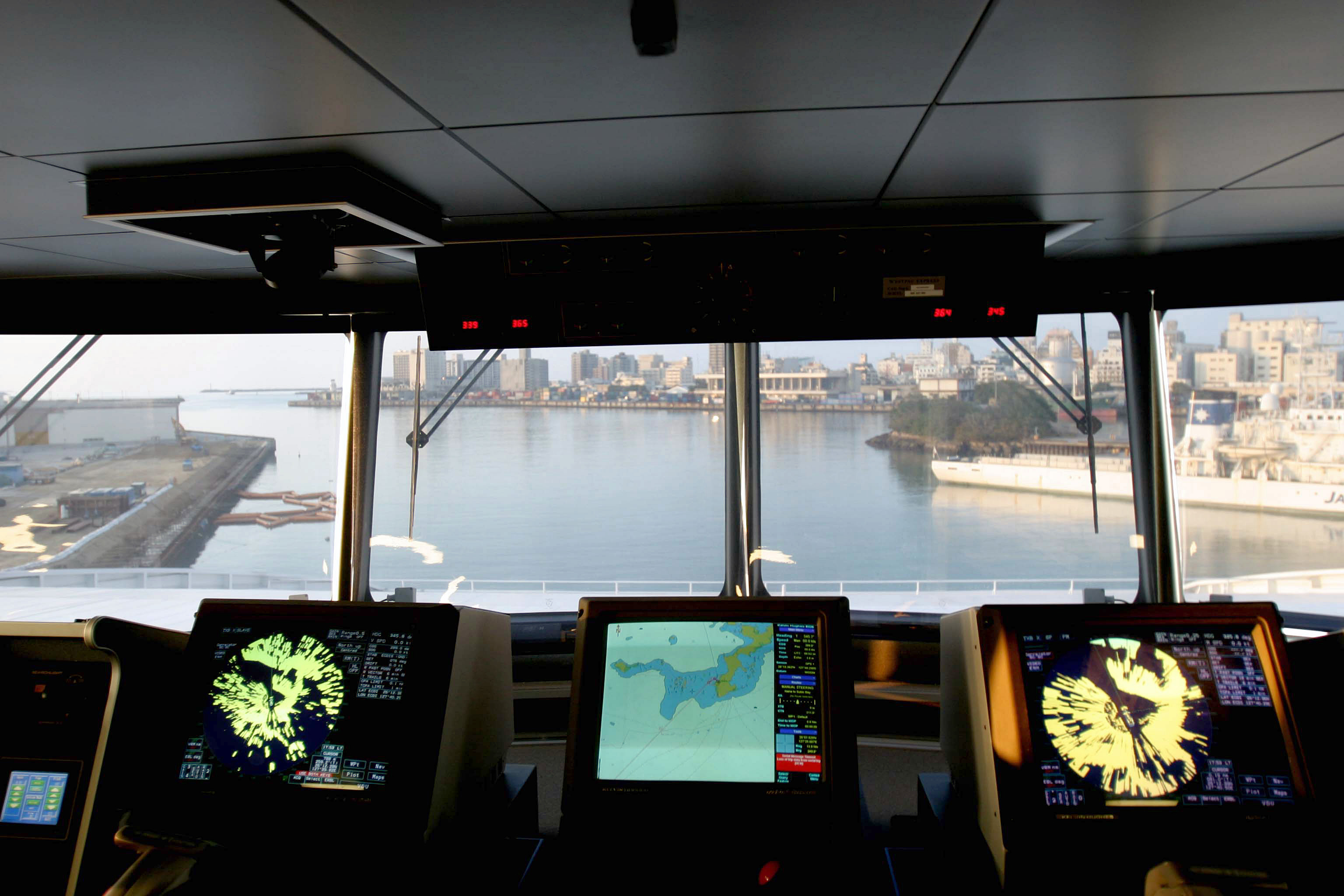
A view of Naha, Okinawa from the bridge of a Military Sealift Command cargo ship

Brown's trial began in Naha on May 26 with testimony from Nakamine. Over the next three days of testimony, Nakamine repeatedly stated that Brown was innocent and that she wanted to withdraw her complaint. She said that any contact between her and Brown on the night in question was consensual and that she allowed Brown to fondle and kiss her breasts. At that point, Nakamine said, she began to resist and Brown became angry. Nakamine testified that when she threatened to call police, Brown threw her cell phone into the [Tengan] river.

Angry at the loss of her cell phone, Nakamine stated that she then embellished the story when she told it to the guards at the Courtney main gate. Nakamine further claimed that she had been coerced by police, prosecutors and her employer, a local agency that provides temporary workers for USMC bases on Okinawa, to file the charges. She said that once the charges were filed, Japanese prosecutors told her she could only withdraw the charges in court. One of the Naha judges then asked Nakamine why she was not angry at Brown to which Nakamine replied, "Because he didn't attempt to rape me. Before, I was angry at him for throwing away my cell phone. But not now."

The next trial hearing took place on June 4. At the hearing, Takaesu stated that Brown had arranged with the Camp Courtney officers' club manager to have sex with Nakamine, but that Nakamine resisted Brown's advances after driving him to the secluded road off base. The Naha prosecutor said during the hearing that Nakamine had insisted on pressing charges.

The next court session was on July 1. At this session, Satoshi Kawamitsu, an attorney for the employment agency that Nakamine worked for, testified that he had tried to arrange a jidan settlement between Brown and Nakamine in December 2002, but Nakamine had insisted on pressing charges. He stated that he informed her that once the charges were filed, she would not be able to withdraw them until the trial began.

At the next court session on July 15, prosecutors submitted evidence that Nakamine had received 13,500US$ from an unknown source just before she recanted the charges during the May court session. The prosecution submitted the evidence in an attempt to show that Nakamine's original statements and desire to press the charges were valid, and later attempts to recant were in bad faith. Brown then took the stand but refused to answer questions as to why his initial statements to Japanese police were different from what Takaesu later stated in court had actually happened on the night in question. The prosecutor asked Brown, "Your original statement that she made sexual advances was false?" Brown replied, "I am not going to answer that." When asked why he would not answer, Brown replied, "Because I want the opportunity for this court to see publicly the type of corruption and distortion of evidence by the police and the prosecutor." Takaesu later said that another reason for Brown's refusal to answer most of the questions was because his answers could be used by the USMC in separate military justice actions against Brown.

During a later court session on September 9, Takaesu attempted to submit medical evidence that Brown had suffered a back injury in 1999 and had a steel collar and bolts inserted around his spine. According to Brown, these injuries made it impossible to for him to assault Nakamine as described in the police report. The Naha court panel of three judges agreed to issue a decision as to whether the evidence was submissible at a later date.

During another trial session later in September, the Naha court decided to accept Nakamine's pre-trial statements and accusations of Brown along with her later attempts to recant. Brown appealed this decision to the Fukuoka High Court's Naha branch, which dismissed the appeal. Japan's supreme court upheld the Fukuoka court's dismissal of the appeal in late November 2003. In October 2003, Brown requested that the three Naha court judges assigned to the trial disqualify themselves, stating that they were "prejudiced against him". The Naha court judges declined to do so, and the trial was set to resume in January 2004.

The trial resumed on January 16, 2004, when the Naha court accepted the evidence of Brown's spinal and neck injuries. Takaesu testified that it would have been physically impossible for Brown to commit a violent sexual assault on Nakamine. When Takaesu called for the clothing Nakamine wore the night of the alleged assault to be entered as evidence, the prosecutor, Tsuyoshi Satake, refused to present it. During a hearing in March, Brown admitted that he had lied to Japanese police about what had happened on the night in question. Brown stated that he and Nakamine had engaged in some "heavy petting" in her car and that she objected when he began to take it "too far". After Brown said that he insulted her, she threatened to call the police and he grabbed her cell phone and threw it in the river.

On April 24, Takeshi Oda, representing the prosecution, made his closing arguments, describing the alleged crime as "vicious and atrocious", and calling for a three-year prison sentence for Brown. Oda added that the alleged crime had affected the local community, stating, "There's a feeling of anxiety among the residents because of this incident." During the same hearing, Takaesu submitted as evidence a letter Brown wrote to Nakamine apologizing for using bad language with her and giving her ¥8,000 (about 75 US$, c.2004) to replace her cell phone.

Following a 19-month trial, on July 8, 2004, Brown was convicted by the Naha District Court of "attempting an indecent act" and "destruction of property" but was acquitted of the rape charge. The court gave Brown a one-year prison sentence, suspended for three years, and fined him 1,400 US$. Chief Judge Nobuyuki Yokota said Brown was given a light sentence because the 21-year Marine veteran had no prior criminal record. Citing the victim's stated unwillingness to punish Brown, the prosecution declined to appeal the verdict. Brown appealed the verdict to Japan's supreme court, which dismissed the appeal in July 2004. Brown was permanently transferred by the U.S. military to Marine Corps Base Quantico, Virginia in August 2004.

== SOFA controversy ==
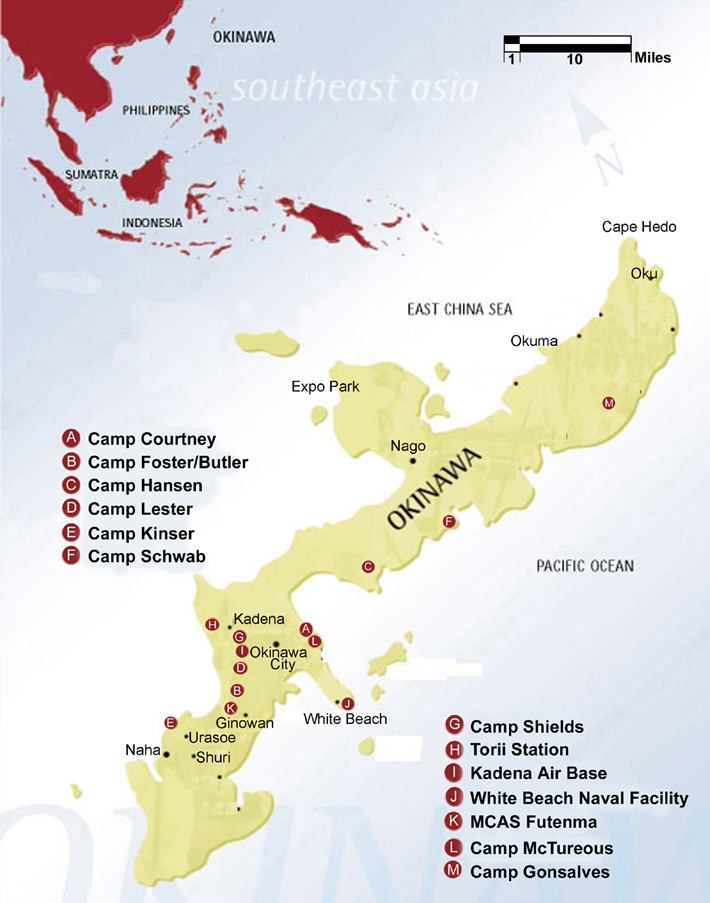
A map of Okinawa showing the locations of U.S. military installations

The issue of violent crime, especially rape and murder, committed by U.S. servicemembers on Japanese citizens in Okinawa has often strained relations between the U.S., Japan, and the local Okinawan government. The U.S. has argued that "extraterritoriality" or "extrality" (meaning the right of a foreigner charged with a crime to be turned over for trial to his own diplomatic representatives in accordance with his national law) granted its military members under the SOFA is necessary to afford them the same rights that exist under the U.S. criminal justice system.

Since the U.S.-Japan SOFA also exempts most U.S. military members from Japanese visa and passport laws, past incidents occurred in which U.S. military members charged with crimes by Japanese authorities on Okinawa were transferred back to the U.S. without facing prosecution in Japanese courts. In cases where the charged servicemember remained in Japan, Japanese authorities often did not have access to question or interrogate the U.S. servicemember, making it difficult for Japanese prosecutors to prepare a case for indictment.

The issue became central to the demand by many Okinawans and other Japanese citizens for the significant reduction and eventual elimination of U.S. military forces stationed in Okinawa. In the opinion of many Japanese citizens living in Okinawa, the U.S. used the SOFA to shield U.S. servicemembers who committed crimes against Japanese citizens from the Japanese criminal justice system. The September 4, 1995, widely reported rape of an Okinawan schoolgirl by three U.S. servicemen caused the U.S. and Japan to revise the SOFA, stating that in the future, the U.S. would give "sympathetic consideration" to the hand-over of U.S. servicemembers accused of violent crimes such as rape or murder to Japanese authorities before indictment.

To many in Okinawa, the incident involving Brown appeared to fall under this new provision in the SOFA. After the initial allegations involving Brown were publicized and before charges had even been filed, Okinawa Governor Keiichi Inamine publicly stated, "This is a heinous crime trampling on female human rights. Moreover, this is a crime committed by a marine corps major, a person who should be in a leadership position."

Japan had requested that the U.S. hand over suspects before indictment in three previous cases to which the U.S. had complied. On December 3, 2002, Japan's national government asked that Brown be transferred to Japanese police officials for confinement, but in this case the United States declined to do until an indictment was handed down. The U.S. embassy stated, "The government of the United States has concluded that the circumstances of this case as presented by the government of Japan do not warrant departure from the standard practice as agreed between the United States and Japan."

On December 10, 2002, the Okinawa Prefectural Assembly unanimously adopted a resolution calling on the United States to immediately transfer Brown to Japanese authorities and called on the Japanese national government to again demand Brown's immediate hand-over. The resolution condemned the United States' refusal to hand over Brown, calling it, "in defiance of our country's judicial setup and in disregard of its sovereignty" and "intolerable". Keiichi Inamine added, "I have come to fully realize anew that a thorough review of the Japan–U.S. Status of Forces Agreement is necessary."

Because of this and subsequent incidents by U.S. servicemembers on Okinawa, including another rape of a local woman by a U.S. Marine, the governors of fourteen Japanese prefectures in which U.S. military forces were stationed urged the ruling Liberal Democratic Party "to secure a true Japan–U.S. partnership through a revised Status of Forces Agreement". On July 2, 2003, Japan and the United States opened negotiations into modifying the SOFA, but the negotiations failed to produce any change to the current agreement.

== Subsequent arrest and conviction ==
In October 2005, Brown was arrested and charged with kidnapping an 18-year-old Chinese-American high school student from a flea market in Milton, West Virginia, on October 2, 2005. According to the police, Brown had purchased collectable coins from the flea market and returned upon finding that they were worthless. Impersonating a police officer, Brown handcuffed the girl and drove her to Kanawha County claiming to be taking her in for questioning. After realizing he was not an officer, the girl escaped from Brown's car.

After the arrest, the USMC demoted Brown to Captain and involuntarily retired him at that rank in February 2006. On August 14, 2009, Brown entered an Alford plea, not admitting to guilt but not contesting that prosecutors had evidence to prove him guilty, and was convicted on a felony charge of attempting to commit kidnapping and a misdemeanor petty larceny charge in Cabell County, West Virginia Circuit Court. Brown was sentenced to three years probation, two years of which were to be spent in home confinement.

== See also ==
- Rape during the occupation of Japan
- 1945 Katsuyama killing incident
- 1955 Yumiko-chan incident
- 1995 Okinawa rape incident
- 2006 Yokosuka homicide
- 2008 Yokosuka homicide

General:

- Sexual assault in the U.S. military
