= Political positions of Miriam Defensor Santiago =

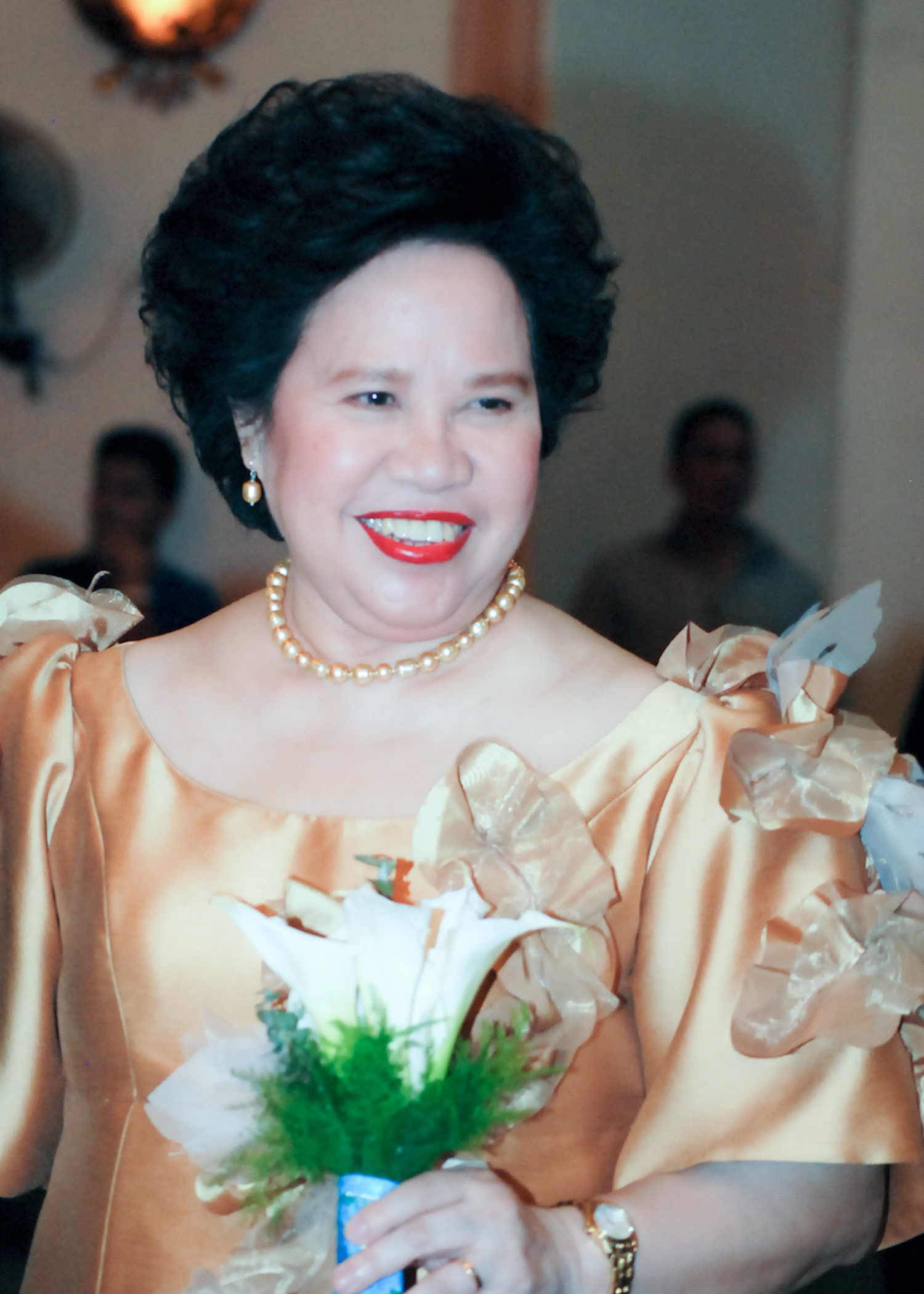
Defensor Santiago in 2015

Miriam Defensor Santiago is a three-term Senate of the Philippines with three presidential candidacies. She was described by the Ramon Magsaysay Award Foundation as an opposition to the corrupt. An interview by the Haribon Foundation showed that Defensor Santiago was the "greenest" of all the candidates in the 2016 Philippine presidential election. During her terms, she has had numerous political positions. She opposes federalism and mining and supports divorce, government transparency, and LGBTQ.

== Domestic policy ==
Defensor Santiago opposes federalism, stating in one interview that if the country would turn Federalist, "[That] the masses and the entire electorate will not [be able to] choose who the president will be. We leave that choice to a group of politicians, and we know how those politicians act. Mostly, their actions are always attended by corruption." Defensor Santiago was in favor of amending the Constitution of the Philippines to enhance foreign investments in the country and to mandate that all high posts in government (senator, representative, president, vice president, governor, mayor, vice mayor, secretaries, undersecretaries, etc.) should have additional qualifications which are 'a college graduate' and must pass a duly-accredited government examination. Numerous politicians in the country are only high school or elementary graduates, and most college graduate officials have never passed the Civil Service Examination for Professionals (CSE-P). She argues that positions in government like administrative assistant must pass the CSE-P as a qualification, 'why not higher posts too?'. Defensor Santiago was the principal author of the Anti-Dynasty Bill in the Senate and had been pushing for its immediate passage in Congress for more than a decade.

She stressed during a live debate that the West Philippine Sea is a sovereign territory of the Philippines and that the country should have a better military and police force and assets and should prioritize enhancing ties with allied nations, especially in the Association of Southeast Asian Nations (ASEAN). She was one of the international law experts who criticized China and aided in the Philippine case against China. The case was won by the Philippines in 2016. Despite this, China still does not recognize the ruling. Defensor Santiago was against the Bangsamoro Basic Law, saying it is unconstitutional because it specifies that Bangsamoro will become a 'sub-state' of the republic which is illegal under the law. She prefers a more constitutional form of the Bangsamoro Basic Law which does not create a 'sub-state' government. Defensor Santiago was in favor of appointing a third-party to conduct under international law "inquiry and fact-finding" to resolve the North Borneo dispute, where the third-party is approved by both the national governments of Malaysia and the Philippines. She cited the 1907 Hague Convention for the Pacific Settlement of Disputes as motivator of her legal position. She said that this can end the dispute as it did in the 1981 involvement of mercenaries in an invasion of the Seychelles, the 1987 use of chemical weapons in the Gulf War between Iran and Iraq, and the 1988 destruction of Korean Air Lines Boeing 747. She said that since no transfer of sovereignty was involved in the 1878 Deed, no transfer of sovereignty has ever passed to Malaysia. She added that the Philippines has never abandoned its claim over eastern Sabah.

Defensor Santiago described herself as a "strong supporter, perhaps to the furthest extreme" of the Freedom of Information Bill but stated it could raise issues in the Supreme Court. In the bill, she wanted officials to disclose their statement of assets, liabilities, and net worth.

== Social policy ==
Defensor Santiago publicly advocated for the passage of a divorce law in the Philippines, saying, "Why would you force [couples] to be together if they want to kill each other by mere sight?" With respect to her position on divorce, she clarified that it should be restricted on two grounds: "an attempt on the life of the spouse by the other" and "when one spouse is already living with another person, that is adultery or concubinage." In the 2016 Presidential campaign, despite being unable to attend the second debate citing health concerns, she reiterated on Twitter her position on divorce, leaving her as the only presidential candidate to favor its legislation. Defensor-Santiago took a critical perspective of abortion and supports maintaining laws against it: "No to abortion, never. I am a very avid supporter of RH [Reproductive Health] Law, but I will definitely fight to the death against abortion as a lawyer, not necessarily as a religious person. I equate it properly with the crime of murder." On contraception, she stressed the importance of its distribution, especially in poverty-stricken areas. She was a strong proponent of the Philippines' Reproductive Health Law, which guarantees universal access to methods on contraception, maternal health and sex education. According to her, the bill was shelved for more than 13 years, citing the Catholic Church's opposition. Defensor Santiago expressed dismay when the RH Law had suffered a one-billion peso budget cut before the Congress in early 2016. She said if she will be elected, she will work for a full and conscientious implementation of the law.

Defensor Santiago magnified the issues concerning the LGBT community before the Senate. In the wake of the Orlando nightclub shooting, she said in a Twitter post, "The mass shooting at a club in Orlando is appalling and heartbreaking" and "I long for the day when the LGBT community no longer has to live in fear of discrimination and hate crimes". Defensor Santiago was one of the senators who advocated the immediate investigation of the Jennifer Laude case, wherein the American marine, Joseph Scott Pemberton, killed Laude, a Filipina transgender woman, in Subic, Zambales. She also supported the passage of the anti-discrimination bill (SOGIE Equality Bill) which protects the rights of people of different sexual orientation, gender identity, and expression. She was the first senator in Philippine history to push for the bill's legislation, filing it repeatedly since 2000. Defensor Santiago favored the death penalty but limited it to heinous crimes, while maintaining that the justice system should be improved.

== Environmental policy ==
Defensor Santiago vehemently opposed mining. She believes mining is one of the greatest reasons why local communities are impoverished as most of the profit coming from mining are siphoned by mining companies away from the local economy. In addition, mining has made numerous destructive advances in Philippine society and ecosystems, destroying watersheds and agricultural lands, as well as rivers and seas. According to an interview conducted by Haribon Foundation during the 2016 Presidential Campaign, the organization voted her as the "greenest" in all of the candidates. She was the main author of the Climate Change Law and the Renewable Energies Law in the Senate.

== Economic policy ==
Defensor Santiago advocated the establishment of the Department of Information which is mandated to speed-up internet connectivity in the Philippines which she described "the worst internet speed in Asia". She also advocated for the passage of the Magna Carta for Philippine Internet Freedom which protects the rights and freedoms of Filipinos in cyberspace, while defining and penalizing cybercrimes. Defensor Santiago advocated the establishment of a completely new railway system from Manila to Sorsogon and a new high-speed transit system connecting Metro Manila to Pampanga, Bulacan. Rizal, Batangas, Laguna, and Cavite. She also advocated the establishment of a new modernized airport and the establishment of new projects in every province in the entire country.
