= Wilson v. Girard =

- Supreme Court of the United States

Argued July 8, 1957 Decided July 11, 1957
- Full case name: Charles E. Wilson, Secretary of Defense, et al., v. William S. Girard, United States Army Specialist 3/C.
- Citations: 354 U.S. 524 (more) 77 S. Ct. 1409; 1 L. Ed. 2d 1544
- Argument: Oral argument

Case history
- Prior: Girard v. Wilson, 152 F. Supp. 21 (D.D.C. 1957) (denying writ of habeas corpus, but granting injunction to petitioner)

Court membership
- Chief Justice Earl Warren Associate Justices Hugo Black · Felix Frankfurter; William O. Douglas · Harold H. Burton; Tom C. Clark · John M. Harlan II; William J. Brennan Jr. · Charles E. Whittaker

Case opinion
- Per curiam
- Douglas took no part in the consideration or decision of the case.

Laws applied
- U.S.–Japan Status of Forces Agreement

Wilson v. Girard, 354 U.S. 524 (1957), was a United States Supreme Court case in which the Court refused to stop the executive branch from handing United States Army soldier William S. Girard over to Japanese authorities for trial. Girard was accused of killing a Japanese woman while assigned to the U.S. Army in Japan, precipitating a major international incident remembered as the "Girard incident".

== Facts ==
On 30 January 1957, Naka Sakai, a 46-year-old Japanese housewife and mother of six, entered Sōmagahara Air Base in Soma, Gunma Prefecture, for the purpose of collecting spent shell casings to sell as scrap metal. U.S. Army Specialist Third Class William S. Girard, a 21-year-old enlisted man from Ottawa, Illinois, used a grenade launcher mounted on an M1 Garand rifle to fire a spent grenade cartridge at Sakai, which hit her in the back and killed her. Girard then was arrested and held by U.S. authorities, but Japanese authorities indicted him for criminal homicide. Under the terms of the U.S.–Japan Status of Forces Agreement (SOFA) then in force, both the United States and Japan could claim jurisdiction over his prosecution. However, the United States' claim had precedence if Girard was "on duty" when the suspected crime occurred. The United States argued that Girard was in fact "on duty", and that he should therefore be tried by US court martial. The Japanese government, however, held that Girard's actions had taken place during a period of rest, making him subject to Japanese law. After much discussion, the Dwight D. Eisenhower administration decided that as a matter of political expediency, they would hand Girard over, given that the case was causing great controversy in Japan and threatened to harm the U.S.–Japan Alliance.

Girard sued to stop his surrender to the Japanese. He petitioned for habeas corpus, claiming he was held unlawfully by the Army. This was denied by the district court, but the district court did enjoin the Army from handing him over to the Japanese. Both sides appealed to the Supreme Court.

== Decision ==
The court first noted the principle that a sovereign nation always has exclusive jurisdiction to prosecute crimes in its territory unless it consents to prosecution by some other authority. The court then cited the U.S.–Japan SOFA for the conditions of Japan's consent to U.S. jurisdiction in this case. One of those conditions was that the U.S. could waive its jurisdiction, which it did in this case. The court then stated that it saw no constitutional problems with such a diplomatic agreement and that the "wisdom" of such agreements are therefore completely within the realm of the political branches. The court upheld the district court's denial of habeas corpus and reversed the injunction. That cleared the way for the executive branch to hand Girard over to the Japanese.
