= Killing of Michael Ovsjannikov =

2023 murder in Wittlich, Germany

- Location: Wittlich, Rhineland-Palatinate, Germany
- Date: 19 August 2023; 2:40 (CEST)
- Attack type: Stabbing
- Weapon: Benchmade folding knife
- Victim: Michael Ovsjannikov
- Accused: Grant Harrison; Robert Cain II
- Charges: Unpremeditated murder; Aggravated assault with a dangerous weapon; Obstruction of justice
- Verdict: Acquitted (Harrison); None (Cain; received immunity)
- Judge: Jennifer Powell

On 19 August 2023, 28-year-old Michael Ovsjannikov was killed in Wittlich, Rhineland-Palatinate, Germany, during the Säubrennerkirmes Volksfest. A few hours later, 26-year-old Grant Harrison and 25-year-old Robert Cain II, U.S. airmen stationed at nearby Spangdahlem Air Base, were arrested. Harrison confessed to fatally stabbing Ovsjannikov.

The arrest, interrogation, and investigation were undertaken by the German Rhineland-Palatinate Police and the American Air Force Office of Special Investigation (OSI), but per the NATO Status of Forces Agreement, Harrison was tried by a U.S. military court, which dismissed the confession as inadmissible evidence. During the court-martial the following year, Harrison's defense argued that Cain had killed Ovsjannikov. The subsequent acquittal of Harrison, immunity from prosecution for Cain, and the accusation by the court that German investigators had obtained the confession under pressure caused protests across the state.

== Background ==
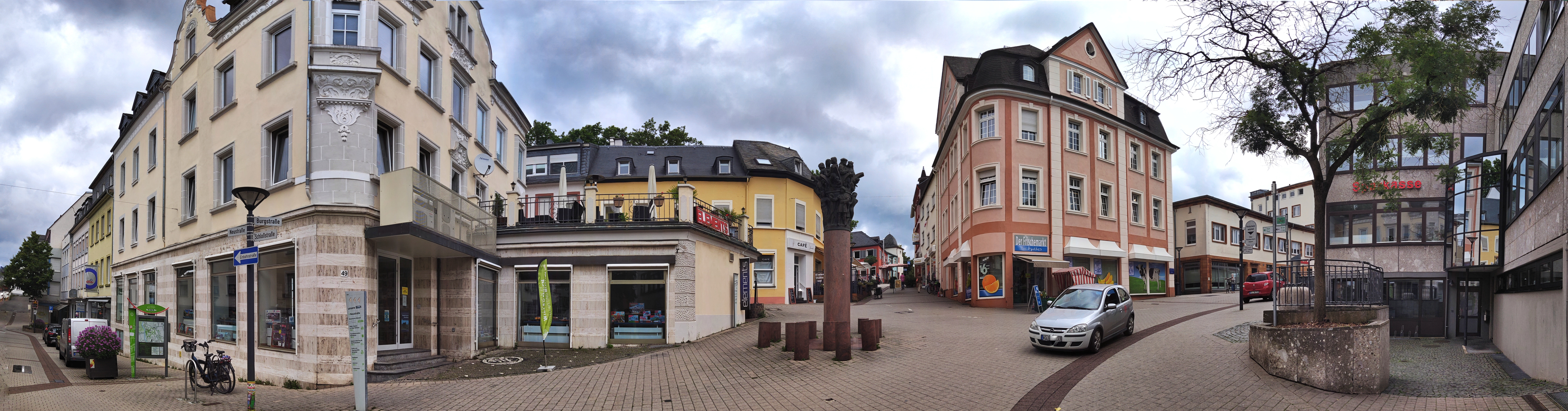
Wittlich inner city, where the attack took place

Since the end of World War II, the United States maintained a strong military presence in Germany, with around 18,000 U.S. soldiers stationed at 10 military bases in Rhineland-Palatinate (compared to 14,000 Bundeswehr soldiers at 18 military bases) as of 2024. Wittlich has a population of under 20,000 and is one of the closest towns to Spangdahlem Air Base, which houses 5,000 active duty personnel and 7,000 military dependents. The Säubrennerkirmes, called "Pig Fest" by the American residents, hosts around 100,000 visitors from all over the state each year.

=== Victim ===
Michael "Micha" Ovsjannikov was born on 13 July 1995 in Wittlich. He won several local and state youth-level judo championships as a child as a member of Polizei SV Wengerohr and JC Vulkaneifel. Ovsjannikov became part of Germany's national youth judo team in his teens. Ovsjannikov was active as an MMA athlete in the lightweight class, starting in the amateur league in 2012, then as a professional fighter since 2015. Ovsjannikov retired from the sport in 2021. Since 2015, he co-managed a private security company, regularly contracted with SV Eintracht Trier 05, and in 2022, he opened a judo school, where he acted as a fighting instructor.

=== Accused ===
Grant D. Harrison was born in the United States. He has the rank of airman first class and was a transient aircraft journeyman as part of the 726th Air Mobility Squadron. Harrison had been in Germany since 2021 and lived off-base in Wittlich.

Robert Cain II was born in the United States. He has the rank of staff sergeant and served in the same squadron as Harrison. Harrison had described Cain as his "former best friend".

== Murder ==
On the night of 19 August 2023, at 2:40 a.m., Ovsjannikov was hanging out with two friends on Trierer Strasse, a block away from his apartment, when he encountered a group of four, consisting of Harrison, Cain, Cain's then-fiancée, and the wife of another airman. The group had attended the carnival in the town square since around 1:00 a.m. and were heading home as the event was nearing its end. All involved were under the influence of alcohol. A confrontation ensued between the men, which ended with Ovsjannikov being fatally stabbed and bleeding to death on the street. Ovsjannikov's last words were reported as "It's going to be fine" ("Alles wird gut"). A passerby recalled seeing the American group quickly walking from the scene, visibly shocked with one of the men bleeding around the face. After the act, the weapon was dropped into the Lieser river and found the following day by a police officer under the Wittlicher Römerbrücke, near Harrison's home.

Ovsjannikov was identified on scene by witnesses. Despite security concerns, the Säubrennerkirmes continued under increased police presence, and after a talk between Wittlich mayor Joachim Rodenkirch and Ovsjannikov's father, it ran as planned in the following days.

== Investigation ==
Ovsjannikov was stabbed four times, three times in the back and once in the side of the stomach. There were no other defensive wounds such as bruises, bloody nose, or busted lip.

A few hours later, an airman called police and told them about Harrison's involvement in the stabbing. Harrison had allegedly confessed to him shortly after fleeing the scene, but the airman was unable to remember the details. At approximately 13:00, Harrison was taken into custody alongside Cain, the two women in their company the previous night, and another male American national. Both Harrison and Cain were found to have Ovsjannikov's blood on their clothes, shoes, and jewelry. Before the questioning, the arrestees were read their rights by officers for German law, and Harrison was also told his rights under the Uniform Code of Military Justice by a special agent and a special investigator of the Air Force Office of Special Investigation. Cain and the others were questioned during the midday hours while Harrison's interrogation took place at about 18:00, spending the hours before waiting at the Wittlich criminal inspectorate. He was allowed to retain his mobile phone after promising to not call anyone, using it to watch anime during the wait. Harrison was interrogated by state police officers of the Trier Police Headquarters, assisted by one of the Air Force investigators acting as an interpreter, for around 2^{1}/_{2} hours, including a 30 minute meal and bathroom break. Harrison's questioning by the Air Force OSI took around two hours.

Cain claimed that he was hit in the head and sat on by the victim, blacked out, and regained consciousness to see Harrison standing over Ovsjannikov's prone body with a knife. Cain also stated that Harrison had written him text messages stating "I stabbed [Ovsjannikov] twice" after returning home. Harrison corroborated Cain's statements, admitted to carrying the knife in his pocket, stabbing Ovsjannikov "once, maybe twice" and disposing of it in the river, reasoning that he "freaked out" and wanted to protect Cain. Harrison stated that he did not remember the events of the night as he was drunk and taking a new prescription medication, claiming he had depression and attempted suicide in the past over his desire to leave the air force. Cain and Harrison claimed that the altercation lasted less than a minute. Cain's later wife, a German national, initially stated that neither her husband or Harrison had carried a knife during the night, but would later testify in court that she had seen the knife in Harrison's apartment the same night as the killing occurred. She attributed the incorrect statement to memory loss.

Cain and his wife claimed the fight occurred after Ovsjannikov spat at one of the women and attacked the group when she returned the gesture, stating they did not know each other. Harrison had stated that the fight began after Cain and Ovsjannikov had got into an argument with each other, making no mention of any incident with Cain's fiancée. Eyewitnesses or surveillance footage also did not corroborate the claim, which was further contested during the trial. Harrison's lawyer asserted that the fight was initiated by Cain and due to a pre-existing personal dispute, citing the owner and patrons of a shisha bar, who claimed that they saw the three men, along with a woman and another airman, engaged in a verbal argument at the establishment a day before the killing.

Cain's version of events was initially believed by the state prosecutor's office and he was released, receiving a minor disciplinary infraction by the air force for his involvement. Harrison stayed in jail and had a hearing at the Trier Higher Regional Court, where he repeated his confession. On 24 August, he was handed to U.S. military authorities, in accordance with the NATO SOFA, thus terminating the legal case against Harrison by the Rhineland-Palatinate's prosecutor's office. The handover is not mandatory, however, and not preferred by both German authorities and American arrestees due to harsher punishment in the United States, including capital punishment for murder convictions, which, under regular circumstances, is punishable by a life sentence with the possibility of parole in 15 years by German courts. Germany may also choose to have the defendant returned when the case concerns "interests of the German judiciary", which includes homicide cases, but this can only occur if U.S. authorities believe that the case may be mishandled by their courts. Harrison was held at United States Army Corrections Facility-Europe in Sembach until court proceedings.

The transfer of the suspect to American authorities led to concerns that a guilty verdict would lead to minimal punishment. A specific comparison was drawn to the 1998 Cavalese cable car crash, in which a low-flying U.S. Marine aircraft severed the cables of an aerial lift at a ski resort, killing 20 people. The two military personnel responsible were found not guilty of manslaughter by an American court and were only dishonorably discharged after a second trial for obstruction of justice, as the pilot had destroyed video evidence of the flight.

== Trial ==
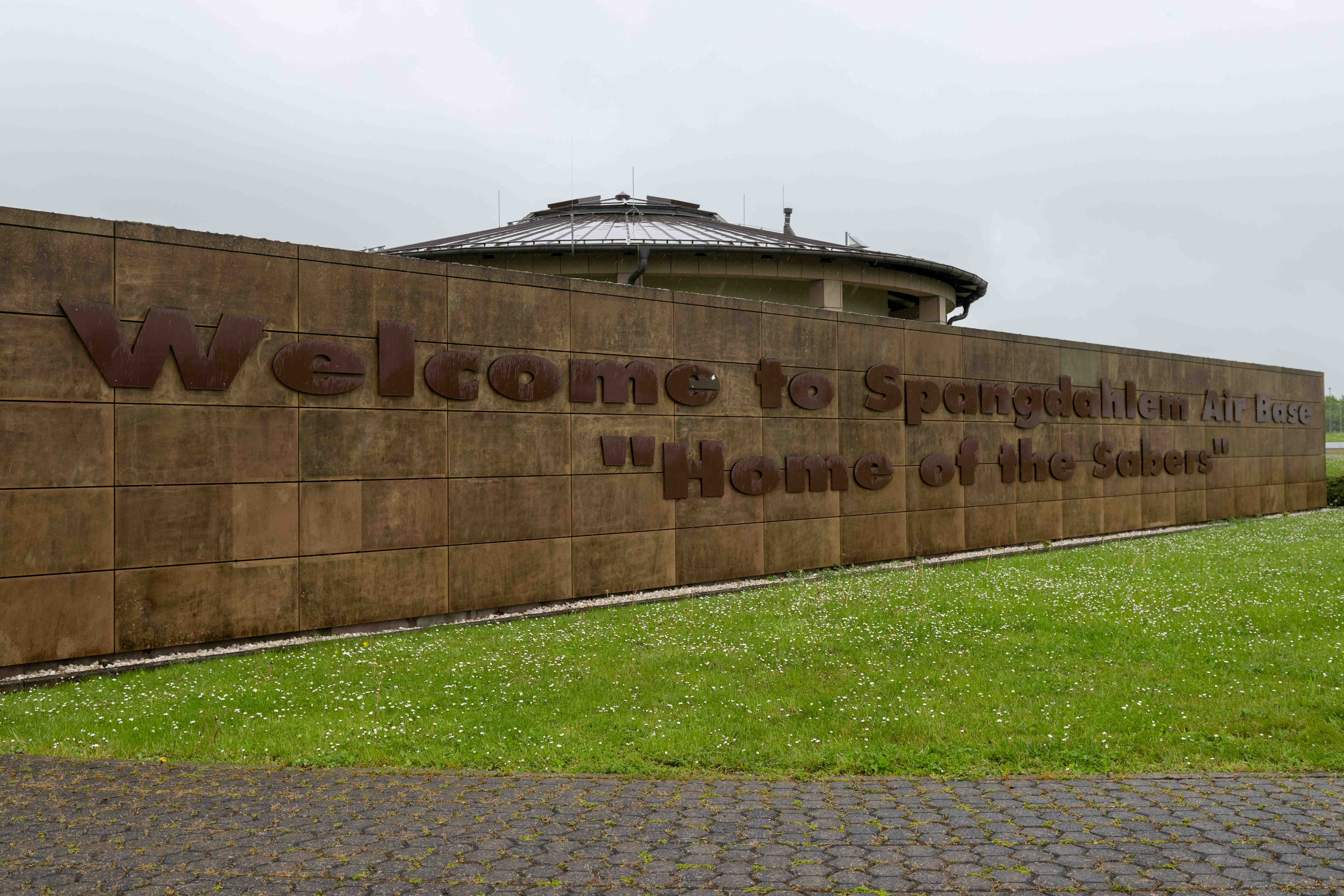
Entrance to Spangdahlem Air Base

Harrison's court-martial began on 28 May 2024, while the murder trial started on 30 September of the same year. Harrison was represented by three attorneys and entered a not guilty plea, asserting that evidence implicated Robert Cain in the murder. If convicted, Harrison faced life imprisonment and a dishonorable discharge. Unlike in German judicial proceedings, co-plaintiffs were not accepted in the trial. Ovsjannikov's family still attended, but had problems following the trial as there was no translation. An interpreter, Denise W., was provided only after relatives complained in a local SWR interview; W. was one of the special agents that handled Harrison's interrogation. The tribunal was headed by Colonel Jennifer Powell, who previously served as a military judge at Kadena Air Base.

Judge Powell refused to enter the confession made in German custody, following an appeal by Harrison's lawyer, Grover Baxley. Baxley's appeal alleged that Harrison had signed a document asking for his agreement to interrogation by marking the "no" box, but told a variation of "if you don't want to speak to us, you'll be going to jail tonight" by an investigator, which Harrison, according to Baxley, interpreted as a threat to change his decision. The prosecution argued that Harrison had signed the "no" box by accident and was asked verbally five times if he really agreed to interrogation.

Judge Powell was in agreement with Baxley that the confession had been obtained "involuntarily", citing Baxley's claims that Harrison was "confused" about his rights, not informed that a homicide had occurred, and that he was threatened with an overnight jail stay if he did not confess. It was also alleged by Powell that Harrison had not been informed of his right to remain silent under U.S. law. Powell rejected the claim that Harrison was denied his right to counsel at the beginning of his interrogation, as there was no record of Harrison making such a request. Although the unsealing of trial records in 2025 showed that Powell's decision was based on Baxley's appeal, said document only cited the protocol of the interrogation by the OSI agents, which no longer involved German police.

The investigators in charge and the state prosecutor's office cited the available protocol of the state officers to show that Harrison had been read his rights and denied using coercion or force, but did state that in accordance with article 112 of the German Code of Criminal Procedure (StPo), remand is a valid and typical option in homicide investigations. It was clarified by the court that Harrison was not actively threatened, but that he still "felt pressured" and believed there would be punishment in case of non-cooperation.

The confession had been separately recorded in two ways, in audio and on video. The initial transcript was created using an dictation machine, and contained a translation of the entire confession, but the remainder of the interrogation was only partial and also in German. The English translations of the officers' questions through OSI investigator Denise W., as well as the original wording of Harrison's responses were thus not recorded. In the video confession, made just after the initial statement, the lead investigator told Harrison "So he [the other officer] will repeat the advisement as subject. And the allegation is, allegation of homicide." and "Last night, at the event, a person passed away during the incident, and we are going to ask some questions about this", both of which were answered with "yes" by Harrison. Harrison's lawyer claimed that the contents of either the transcript or video were irrelevant and insisted that his client had been misinformed about his rights at the very beginning of his interrogation. The video did reveal that despite earlier mention of homicide, one of the American investigators, Angelo M., had mistakenly read Harrison the rights for aggravated assault with intent to do grievous bodily harm during this second time. Similarly, in the notice of suspect rights signed by Harrison, there were instances were the English language fields had been left blank, such as the "criminal provisions/charges" field, which read "Verdacht Tötungsdelikt" ("suspicion of homicide") in the German line, but lacked a written English translation.

Following the unsealing of trial records in 2025, it was revealed that the OSI agents had produced a three-page protocol of their exchange with Harrison, including a repetition of his confession. The records also showed that judge Powell believed that the OSI had made the "strategic decision" to leave out written translations and advise Harrison on his rights in an assault case rather than murder or manslaughter, so that Harrison would speak more freely, which Powell described as a "ploy". While the prosecution had argued that Harrison was already aware of the investigation being about homicide from his exchange with German police, Powell saw no evidence that the OSI agent involved in both interrogations, Denise W., had provided correct translations.

The trial featured the testimony of the involved Americans and their spouses, as well as that of two eyewitnesses. Dmytro Mynka, a friend of Ovsjannikov, claimed that he was close-up during the stabbing and gave a description consistent with Cain's clothing. However, he was dismissed by prosecutor Christie Jones as "hysteric". Adelheid Steffen, a local woman, stated that she saw two men in a physical struggle for several minutes before both fell to the ground. She did not see the start of the altercation, but corroborated that Ovsjannikov had sat on his opponent. Only one of the men got back up and ran off. According to Steffen, the scene was watched by "two Ukrainians and one American [man]". The OSI agents were not called to the witness stand and Ovsjannikov's family was not told that their interpreter had handled Harrison's interrogation.

On 11 October 2024, Harrison was found not guilty by a jury, which consisted of an eight-person panel of enlisted U.S. military personnel from Spangdahlem Air Base. Contrary to German court proceedings, no reason was provided for the verdict. Cain was given criminal immunity for cooperating with authorities and acting as a witness during the trial and would only be liable in case of lying under oath.

== Aftermath ==
A makeshift memorial was set up on Trierer Strasse. On 28 August 2023, Ovsjannikov's funeral service was held at St. Peter Church in Wengerohr and attended by 1,000 visitors, including mayor Joachim Rodenkirch and Spangdahlem Air Base Commander Kevin Crofton.

The Säubrennerkirmes retained increased police patrols as a security measure in the years after Ovsjannikov's death. In 2025, on the second anniversary of Ovsjannikov's death, a 100 balloon release memorial was organised by Wittlich residents on the street where the killing occurred.

Prosecutor of Trier Higher Regional Court Peter Fritzen denied the allegations levied by Harrison's defense. Contradicting the appeal that led to the suppression of the confession, Harrison's attorney Grover Baxley claimed that only "German Polizei" had handled the interrogation of Harrison, that officers told him that he was held for aggravated assault rather than homicide, and that the confession was coerced. Fritzen stated that American investigators were present and talked with the suspects, that police disclosed the homicide investigation to Harrison and that no force was used by police. The prosecutor's office saw no merit in the accusations based on limited documentations provided by U.S. military authorities. The parents of Ovsjannikov accused Harrison's attorney of establishing the defense on a false basis. Rhineland-Palatinate Minister of Justice Herbert Mertin has ordered a re-examination of the validity of handover of Harrison and Cain to NATO custody. Although Mertin died in office only three months after the order in February 2025, the process of reevaluating the NATO SOFA by the state ministry of justice is ongoing as of January 2026.

During the 202nd plenary session of the Bundestag on 4 December 2024, North Rhine-Westphalia MP Sevim Dağdelen asked Minister of State Anna Lührmann whether the federal government had plans to review the NATO SOFA and the NATO SOFA Supplementary Agreement in light of the recent acquittal in Ovsjannikov's killing. Lührmann maintained that a review and prosecution of U.S. troops in general would be a matter to be overseen by the individual states.

Ovjannikov's family is seeking to abolish the status of forces agreement in Germany through state and federal courts, as well as the European Court of Justice. In January 2026, Ovsjnannikov's parents filed a lawsuit against the Trier Public Prosecutor's Office. The thirty-page suit alleges that the prosecutor's office had failed to invoke Article 19 § 3 of the NATO SOFA Supplementary Agreement, according to which Germany can regain judiciary from NATO i.e. the United States in cases of "essential concerns of the German administration of justice", which include homicide offences. The Koblenz Prosecutor's Office argues that the Ovsjannikov family lacks standing for legal action in relation to the case, as the NATO Status of Force Agreement covered arrangement between nations and their militaries, and does not consider private persons, including individual victims' rights. Approval of the lawsuit is pending with Koblenz Higher Regional Court. On 22 January 2025, Rhineland-Palatinate Minister of Justice Philipp Fernis announced that while the NATO agreement itself could only be modified by the federal government, the state was planning to make it easier to invoke a return of judiciary over cases that fall under the agreement's purview and that victims of crimes and their dependents were allowed to file civil cases. Filing of such a return would no longer have to go through the state ministry of justice and be handled under direct authority of the public prosecutor's offices. The state ministry also recommended to police that should make exclusive use of sworn interpreters in severe criminal cases involving U.S. military personnel.

For over a month, there were regular protests outside the Spangdahlem Air Base and the Landtag of Rhineland-Palatinate by hundreds of locals who criticized the verdict. Harrison was still working at the air base as of November 2024, but the U.S. Air Force were in the process of discharging him.

In summer 2025, the killing gained renewed interest in Japan, where cases of serious crimes committed by U.S. military personnel stationed on their territory is commonly reported on, often with criticism in regards to lenient or a complete lack of punishment through judicial authorities.

== See also ==
- Girard incident, killing of a Japanese civilian by a U.S. Army soldier
- Murder of Yoshie Sato, killing of a Japanese civilian by a U.S. Navy airman
- Murder of Yun Geum-i, murder of a South Korean civilian by a U.S. serviceman in Korea
- Killing of Jennifer Laude, death of a Filipina civilian by a U.S. Marine
