= Omoiyari Yosan =

Popular term for cost sharing by Japan

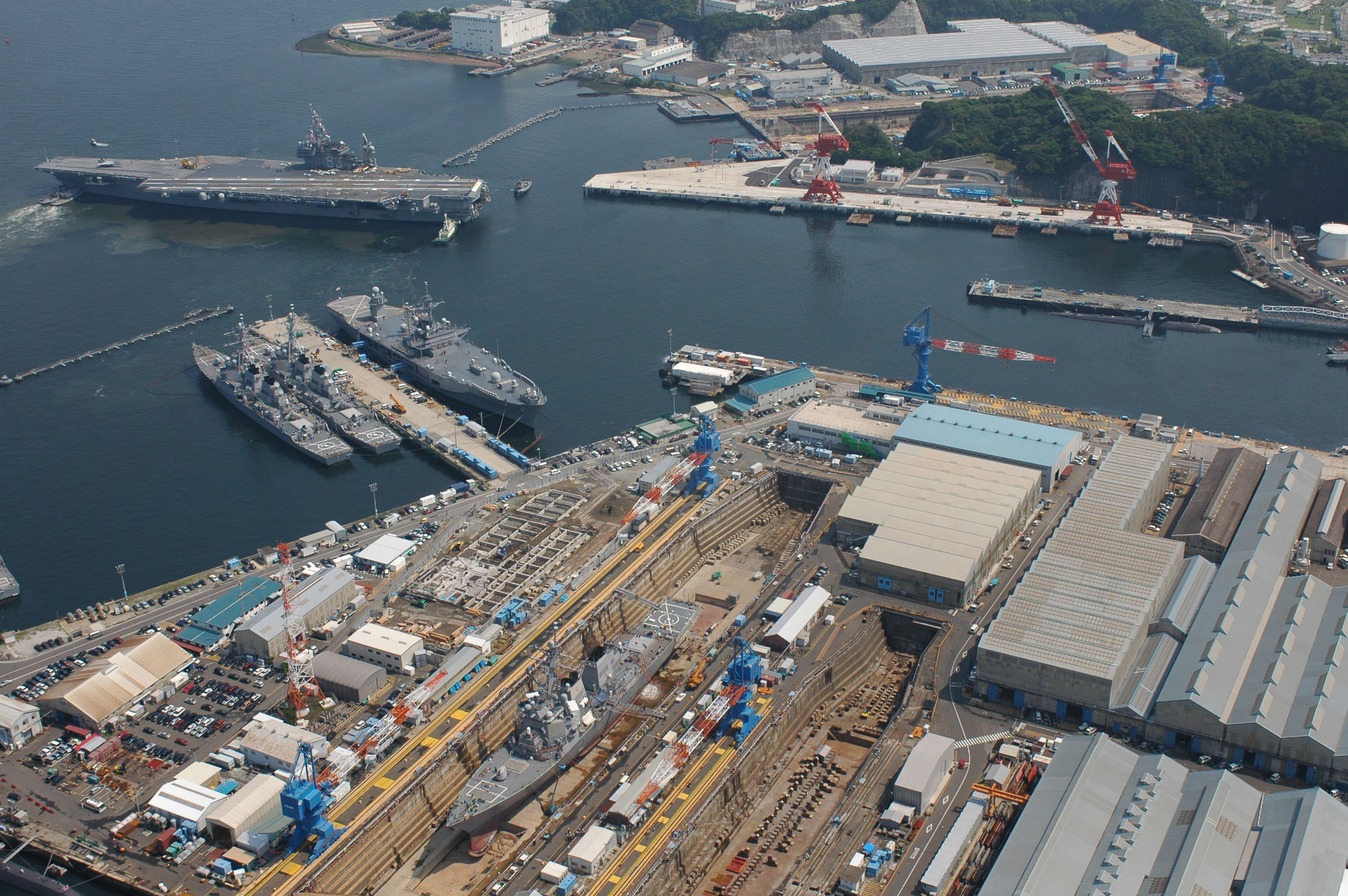
USS Kitty Hawk (CV-63) docks at the U.S. Navy base in Yokosuka, Japan.

Omoiyari Yosan (思いやり予算; lit. sympathy budget), is a popular term for funds provided by Japan as host nation support for the U.S. forces stationed in Japan. The official term is Cost Sharing for the US Forces Stationed in Japan (在日米軍駐留経費負担, Zainichi Beigun Churyu Keihi Futan). Although the term technically only covers the portion of financial support not mandated under the 1960 U.S.-Japan Status of Forces Agreement (SOFA), it is popularly used to refer to Japanese support as a whole. The specific terms for cost-sharing are codified under the "Special Measures Agreement," the most recent of which was signed in 2016.

The term originates from comments made in 1978 by the then Director-General of the Japan Defense Agency, Shin Kanemaru, in defense of the Japanese government's decision to share financial responsibilities for the American bases in Japan. When questioned about the expenditure, Kanemaru replied that they were provided out of "sympathy".

== Background ==
Under the 1960 SOFA agreement, the support Japan was required to provide for US Forces Japan (USFJ) was limited to the provision of "facilities and areas" for use:

ARTICLE XXIV

1. It is agreed that the United States will bear for the duration of this Agreement without cost to Japan all expenditures incident to the maintenance of the United States armed forces in Japan except those to be borne by Japan as provided in paragraph 2.

2. It is agreed that Japan will furnish for the duration of this Agreement without cost to the United States and make compensation where appropriate to the owners and suppliers therof all facilities and areas and rights of way, including facilities and areas jointly used such as those at airfields and ports, as provided in Articles II and III.

However, with the rising of the yen against the dollar increasing the cost of maintaining forces in Japan and Japan's rapid economic growth increasing the ability of the Japanese to contribute, the United States began to pressure Japan in the mid-1970s to increase its financial support.

== Origins of the term ==
The Japanese government first agreed to provide additional support in 1978 by assuming responsibility for the welfare payments of Japanese nationals employed by the USFJ. When questioned in the Diet about the new appropriation in June, Kanemaru made a series of statements in which he repeatedly used the word "omoiyari," which means sympathy or consideration:

- On June 6, he asked "given how indispensable the US-Japan relationship is and the situation with the strengthening of the yen versus the dollar, isn't it alright to have sympathy if we do this not because America is requesting it, but rather to increase the sense of trust between us?"
- On June 8, "It's because I think that some sympathetic consideration here can improve the US-Japan relationship... I sincerely believe that the US-Japan Security Treaty is essential to maintaining Japan's independence and security today. As such, isn't it necessary to address the issue of burden sharing with an approach based on the importance of having deep sympathy?"
- On June 29, "Now, about the issue of host nation expenditures. When I explained to Secretary Brown that although we may not be able to promise anything specific in terms of numbers yet, our agency will, from a sympathetic position, put effort into presenting a more detailed view on the issue within the scope of SOFA prior to his visit to Japan. He was very pleased and no further request was made from the American side."

Because of the continual use of the term, both by Kanemaru and those questioning him, these additional expenditures became known as the "sympathy budget."

The circumstances that led to the initial establishment of the budget have since ceased, but the budget itself has continued. The current Japanese government explains the rationale for the sympathy budget in this way: "As a measure to ensure the smooth operation of US forces stationed in Japan, and taking due consideration of the financial situation, our nation voluntarily bears part of the operating costs for those troops."

== Expansion of the budget and current status ==
The additional support provided by the Japanese government has rapidly expanded since 1978. Although initially handled on an ad hoc basis, since 1987 the US and Japanese governments have signed a series of Special Measures Agreements (SMA) formally establishing the Japanese commitment of support. The most recent SMA, covering the five-year period from 2011–2015, was signed in January 2011. The agreements cover the categories of expenses that will be paid for by the Japanese government rather than specify specific monetary amounts.

The most significant expansions in Japanese support have been:

- partial assumption of welfare costs for Japanese employed by USFJ (since 1978)
- establishment of the Facilities Improvement Program (FIP) which provides funds for the maintenance and upgrade of facilities and areas provided to USFJ (since 1979)
- partial assumption of labor costs for Japanese employed by USFJ (since 1987)
- partial assumption of utility costs for USFJ (since 1991)
- assumption of USFJ training relocation costs (since 1996)

These expanded costs have become Japan's most significant contribution to the US-Japan security alliance. In 2002 Japan's contributions represented more than 60% of all allied financial contributions to the US and covered 75% of USFJ's operating costs.

The appropriation amount steadily increased from 1978 to 2001, but has since declined due to pressures placed on the Japanese government (see Opposition below). The 2012 Japanese defense budget allocated ¥186.7 billion for cost sharing (¥144.4 billion of which are SMA-related payments.) This represents a 0.5% increase from the previous year and a 10.4% decrease from 5 years earlier.

=== International comparison of the cost of host nation support ===
Percentage and amount of total host nation support borne by major U.S. allies (2002):

Country	Percentage borne	Amount (million USD)
Japan	74.5%	4,411.34
Saudi Arabia	64.8%	53.38
Qatar	61.2%	81.26
Luxembourg	60.3%	19.25
Kuwait	58.0%	252.98
Italy	41.0%	366.55
South Korea	40.0%	843.11
Germany	32.6%	1,563.92

== Opposition ==
With the downturn in Japan's economic fortunes and the ending of the Cold War, criticism by opposition parties and the public have increased. In 1998 former Prime Minister Morihiro Hosokawa proposed ending the budget in 2000 when the then-current SMA expired due to Japan's "severe financial crisis."

When the 2008 SMA came to a vote in the Japanese Diet, it was opposed by the opposition Communists, Democrats (DPJ), and Social Democrats, leading to its failure to pass the House of Councillors. Although the House of Representatives later overrode the decision, the opposition managed to create a one-month gap between the prior Agreement's expiration and the new one's passage, the first gap since the support was established in 1978. In explaining their opposition, the Democrats stated that the Japanese government needed to "negotiate from the viewpoint of the Japanese people," while criticizing the government for destabilizing the lives of the bases' Japanese workforce.

Shortly after becoming prime minister of the first non-LDP government since 1996, Yukio Hatoyama promised a "comprehensive review" of the sympathy budget. The 2011 SMA was presented with few changes by his DPJ successor, however, and passed with LDP support.

== See also ==
- U.S.–Japan Status of Forces Agreement
- Japan–United States relations
