= 1995 Okinawa rape incident =

Rape of a Japanese girl by US servicemen

- Location: Kin, Okinawa Prefecture, Japan
- Date: 4 September 1995; 31 years ago
- Attack type: Child rape, child abduction, torture
- Weapon: Duct tape
- Victims: 12-year-old Okinawan girl
- Perpetrators: Marcus Dion Gill; Rodrico Harp; Kendrick Maurice Ledet
- Verdict: Pleaded guilty
- Convictions: Gill, Harp: Rape resulting in injury Ledet: Conspiracy
- Sentence: Gill, Harp: 7 years in prison Ledet: 6 1/2 years in prison

The 1995 Okinawa rape incident (Japanese: 沖縄米兵少女暴行事件) occurred on September 4, 1995, when three American U.S. servicemen, 22-year-old U.S. Navy Seaman Marcus Dion Gill, 21-year-old U.S. Marine Rodrico Harp, and 20-year-old Kendrick Ledet, all serving at Camp Hansen in Okinawa Island, rented a van and kidnapped a 12-year-old Okinawan girl. Gill beat her, after the other two duct-taped her eyes and mouth shut, and bound her hands. Gill and Harp then raped her, while Ledet—who was described in news reports at the time as being small framed in school—claimed he only pretended to do so due to fear of Gill.

The offenders were tried and convicted in Japanese court by Japanese law, in accordance with the U.S.–Japan Status of Forces Agreement. The incident led to further debate over the continued presence of U.S. forces in Japan among Okinawans. As a result of this case, governments on both sides would seek ways to reduce Okinawa's base burden, and in the decades following, various measures would be enacted to prevent sexual crimes from happening, along with Japan increasing prison lengths for rape and making it so prosecutors can bring offenders to justice even if charges are not brought by the victim.

== Kidnapping and rape ==
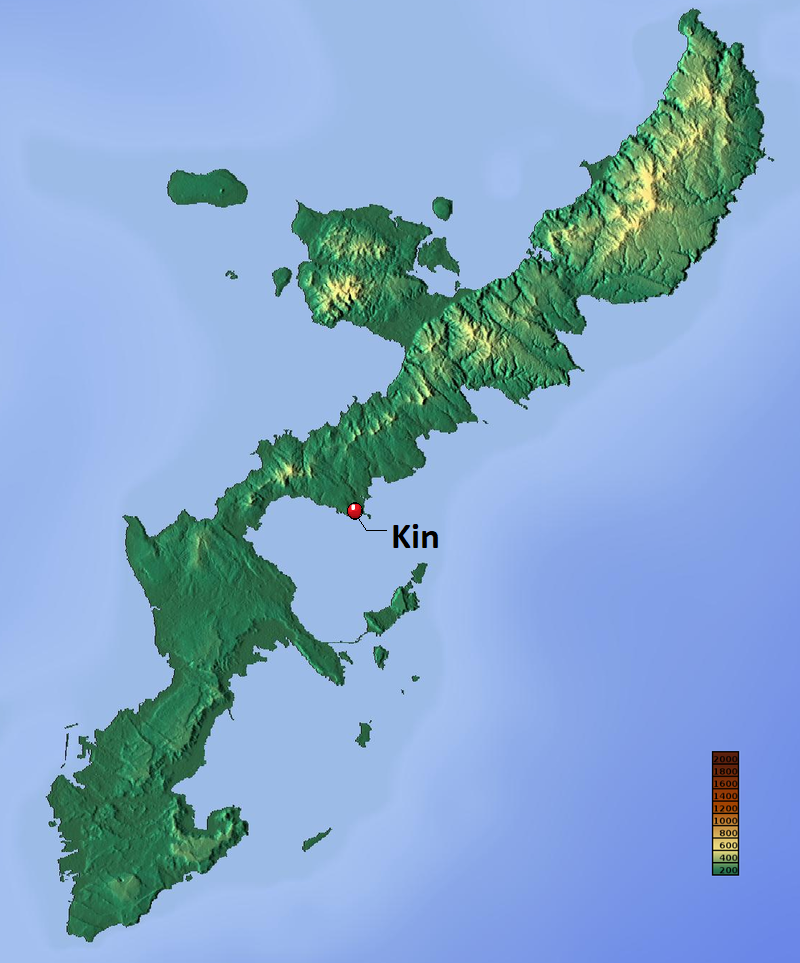
Location of Kin in Okinawa

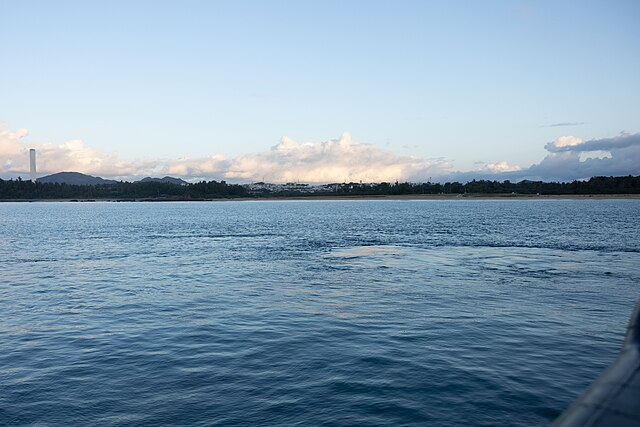
Blue Beach Training Area, where the rape took place

Between 7:00 and 8:00 p.m., the victim left her home with ¥150 after telling her mother she needed a notebook for school, which had begun three days prior. Earlier, at about 4:00 p.m., while the three perpetrators and a fourth unnamed US Marine were driving around after clubbing off base, Gill allegedly asked them if they had ever "thought of doing something crazy", which soon after prompted a conversation among them about how they would theoretically commit a rape, with one of them asking who had the hardest punch to make the target unconscious. Gill eventually suggested doing it for real, prompting them to head to a store at Kadena Airbase where Harp and Ledet purchased condoms and electrical tape. The three spent the next four hours searching for a target, with the specific intent to abduct a school-aged victim, and at one point attempting to abduct a woman in an alleyway before she ran into a building after being accosted by Harp.

At roughly 8:00 p.m., the three saw the victim enter a general store where she had walked a short distance from her home to buy a notebook. After she exited, Harp approached her and asked for directions, and as this happened, Ledet punched her and grabbed her by the neck to pull her into the car while Harp assisted. She attempted to shout for help but was punched again twice. While in the car, Harp taped her mouth, hands, and ankles at Gill's direction before Ledet put tape over her eyes. They drove to Blue Beach Training area, where, according to prosecutors, Gill punched her in the face and abdomen, and shoved her back into the car where he continued to beat her until she was barely conscious before he raped her. Harp claimed in testimony to the court that he was told by Ledet not to rape her, and to just get in the car after Gill to "Keep Gill from jumping on her." When interviewed by John Junkerman in 2012, he claimed that he walked away to urinate while Gill was in the car.

Afterward, according to Gill's testimony in court, he and Ledet made jokes about the crime before Ledet went back into the van and stripped down to his underwear, but was unable or unwilling to rape the victim. Harp then entered the van and raped her. After they drove off, the victim walked until she found a house where she called her mother and explained what happened. Her mother filed a complaint with the police, who were able to quickly identify the men based on the victim's description of them, including the exact number on the license plate of the rental van. The victim told police that she was determined to report the crime as soon as possible, saying she "did not want any other girls to experience the same".

== Reaction ==
When Japanese police arrived to take custody of the three, the U.S. military police denied the request, invoking Article 17, Paragraph 5C of the 1960 Status of Forces Agreement, which covers the rights and obligations of U.S. forces in Japan. The U.S. is obliged to hand over criminal suspects only after they have been indicted. In this case, the U.S. compromised by permitting the police to take the suspects each day for questioning, but insisted that they stay overnight in the brig at Camp Hansen.

Photographs of the suspects' faces were for a time virtually absent from Japan's media. News executives were concerned that public anger over the rape would be further inflamed and take on racist overtones if the race of the suspects were widely publicized. A U.S. military public-affairs officer, speaking from the US military's Japan headquarters at Yokota, said he could not disclose the suspects' races out of respect for their privacy.

After the incident became known, public outrage began, especially over the U.S.–Japan Status of Forces Agreement, which gives the U.S. service members a certain measure of extraterritoriality (exemption from jurisdiction of local law) only as it relates to the place the suspects were detained. While the crime was committed away from a U.S. military base, the U.S. initially took the men into custody, on September 6. Although false rumors spread that the suspects were free to roam the base and had been seen eating hamburgers, the suspects were held in a military brig until the Japanese officials charged them with the crime. The families of the defendants initially claimed that Japanese officials had racially discriminated against the men because they were all African American and coerced confessions from them, but later retracted the claims.

Despite an immediate request by Japanese law enforcement for custody and eventual trial, the men were only transferred on September 29, after the Japanese had formally indicted them. This delay was in conformity with the Status of Forces agreement (SOFA), which states, "The custody of an accused member of the United States armed forces or the civilian component over whom Japan is to exercise jurisdiction shall, if he is in the hands of the United States, remain with the United States until he is charged." Although the military drove the suspects to police headquarters in Naha for daily interrogations, the SOFA provision and the delay in transferring the suspects increased the outrage due to the attack, causing a surge of Anti-American sentiment among Okinawans and Japanese in general.

The Okinawa Prefectural Assembly passed a resolution to protest against the actions of the U.S. military. On October 21 the anti-base movement reached its apex, a rally was held in Ginowan City to protest the incident and the U.S. military bases. About 85,000 residents participated in the rally, including the Governor of Okinawa Masahide Ota. This was the largest protest in Okinawa since the treaty was signed in 1960. The then governor of Okinawa Masahide Ota even refused to sign the documents required by the U.S. military base.

As a consequence of the protests regarding jurisdiction, the U.S. made concessions and agreed to consider transferring suspects to the Japanese before an indictment if the severity of the alleged crime warranted it. This agreement was decided at an emergency meeting between U.S. president Bill Clinton and Japanese prime minister Ryutaro Hashimoto. The people of Okinawa also placed a full-page advertisement in The New York Times decrying the rape and other aspects of the U.S. bases in Okinawa.

== Trial ==
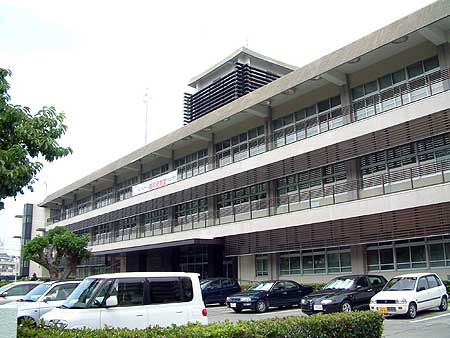
Naha District Court

In a trash can on Camp Kinser, U.S. military investigators had retrieved the three assailant's discarded pairs of underwear, each stained in the victim's blood, as well as a notebook, and a roll of electrical tape—all of which were in the same plastic bag the victim obtained from the general store.

Having been encouraged by his lawyer, who told him that Japanese courts are generally more lenient to those who confess their crimes and express remorse, Gill pleaded guilty to the rape, though he continuously claimed in letters and phone calls to his parents that he and the other two were being manipulated by police into making statements in accordance with a false story, claiming that he would be killed if he did not acquiesce, and that police were presenting them with evidence such as photographs of his own blood stained underwear, which he said did not make sense, given that he would never throw away a pair of underwear with his name sewed on it. Despite this, Gill bragged in court while addressing the victim and her family that he had taken responsibility for the rape by admitting he had done it. Previously, the victim asked the judges to imprison the three for life in a letter read by prosecutors, with the victim's parents begging the court in separate letters asking the judges to give them the death penalty. Gill further claimed that he was unaware of the victim's young age due to a lack of light. In one letter, Gill asked his parents to look after his family for him, and further went on to claim that he believed his circumstances were a divine punishment for faltering in his faith as a Jehovah's Witness. The other two men insisted throughout the trial that they had not committed rape, but pleaded guilty to conspiracy. The trial concluded on March 7, 1996. Gill had explained to the judges that he had been under a lot of work-related stress in the weeks preceding the crime which was exacerbated by his orders for a transfer back to the U.S. being canceled after he had failed his Physical Readiness Test for excess weight. His attorney claimed that this also caused him to have homicidal ideation.

On the trial session on December 11 of the same year, Harp's statement detailing his alleged role in the kidnapping and rape was read aloud in court. When prompted by his attorney, Harp said that he had tried to correct investigators, that he had never raped the victim, and that he had signed the statement confessing to his crimes under duress from American police. He also said no when his lawyer asked if he had read the statement clearly before signing. He further went on to apologize for claiming he was not the one who bound the victim's hands during an earlier session.

The trial itself suffered from complications as a result of the language barrier with interpreters sometimes failing to translate the defendant's fast speech in its entirety. Gill would claim that his willingness to confess to the rape itself, at times speaking so graphically that the court translator had to force back tears, demonstrated that his contrition and account of events was the most trustworthy, boasting throughout the trial for having testified about the rape in detail. When interviewed thirty years later Hatsumi Kinjo, the court interpreter, said that she was appalled by the sheer lack of respect towards the victim, further stating that he tried to defend himself by saying he "didn't think she was that young." Gill bragged to the panel of judges at one point, saying "How many of you could do what I have done today?" regarding his testimony. Veering into statements "that sounded more like a lecture to the court" according to one observer and at several points making clear his belief that his admission of the rape had earned him salvation in the afterlife.

During the final hearing in January 1996, judges had detailed the strife that the victim and her family had been put through by the attack, including a written statement from them imploring the court to give them life sentences, as well as explaining that the victim was now depressed. Judges were described as becoming "visibly impatient during the rambling statements by Gill and Ledet—who were best friends before the rape—in which they sought to incriminate one another" Prosecutors had recommended a ten-year sentence for each man. The judge sentenced Ledet to six and a half years, after determining that he was unable or unwilling to rape once in the car, and sentenced Gill and Harp to seven years' imprisonment and hard labor which, at the time of the trial, was considered an average punishment by Japanese standards. In the decades following, average Japanese sentence lengths for all sex crimes would increase substantially. Their families also paid monetary reparation to the family of the victim despite the father rejecting it upon learning it would be used to mitigate sentence length. Harp and Ledet expressed their intention to appeal their sentence, but were convinced not to by their attorneys. Gill made no effort towards making an appeal, despite his lawyer claiming during the trial that Gill had planned to if the sentence exceeded five years.

== Aftermath ==
The three men served prison terms in Japanese prisons and were released during 2003 and then given Other Than Honorable discharge from the military. After release, Rodrico Harp decried prison conditions in Japan and said that the electronics assembly prison labor he was forced to do amounted to slave labor. Ledet, whom the panel of Japanese judges concluded did not commit rape in 1995, died in 2006 in an apparent murder–suicide in the United States. He was found in the third-floor apartment of Lauren Cooper, a junior Kennesaw State University student and acquaintance whom he had apparently raped and murdered by strangulation. He then ended his own life by using a knife to slice open his veins at the elbows. In 2008, a movie named The First Breath of Tengan Rei based on the Okinawa incident was released.

In December 2011, then-Defense Minister Yasuo Ichikawa was the subject of a censure motion from the opposition Liberal Democratic Party for failing to know the details of the rape. This followed his subordinate Satoshi Tanaka speaking with reporters in a tavern and using euphemisms for rape to discuss relocating the U.S. Marine Corps Air Station Futenma. Satoshi Tanaka was terminated as director of the Okinawa Defense Bureau, and in the cabinet reshuffle of January 13, 2012, Ichikawa was replaced by Naoki Tanaka.

John Junkerman, director of Hellfire: A Journey from Hiroshima, expressed interest in interviewing both of the surviving perpetrators for his film about Okinawa's contentious history with its U.S. military presence. However, in attempting to get into contact with Gill and his wife Feliciå L. Gill in Humble, Texas, where Gill works as a trucker despite being a victim of an unprovoked assault that left him paralyzed, Junkerman was only able to speak with Gill's mother, who told him that her son refused and had no interest in "Talking about where he was or what he was doing". Junkerman also pursued a response from Harp, who eventually expressed interest after several months. Junkerman interviewed him in Harp's home in Griffin, Georgia, in 2012, where Harp spoke openly for two and a half hours about the rape incident and the surrounding events, and about how much he wished he could take it all back.

On September 9, 2025, the Okinawa Times reported that Ledet's criminal history prior to joining the Marine Corps was more abundant than had been realized by the investigators and legal teams at the time with the robbery and aggravated assault of his ex-girlfriend.

== See also ==
- 1945 Katsuyama killing incident
- 1955 Yumiko-chan incident, took place exactly 40 years prior
- 2002 Okinawa Michael Brown incident
- 2006 Yokosuka homicide
- 2008 Yokosuka homicide
- Rape during the occupation of Japan
- Sexual assault in the U.S. military
