= United States Navy Physical Readiness Test =

U.S. Navy fitness test

A Physical Readiness Test, also known as a Physical Fitness Assessment, or PFA, is conducted by the United States Navy to determine the physical fitness of their sailors.

== Standard testing ==
The Physical Fitness Assessment consists of a Body Composition Assessment (BCA) and a Physical Readiness Test (PRT), which includes a timed cardio event consisting of 1.5-mile (2.4 km) run/treadmill or a 500 yd (460 m) swim (or an alternate cardio consisting of 12-minutes on a stationary bike), timed curl-ups, and timed sit-ups.

PFA scores from lowest to highest are fail, probationary, satisfactory, good, excellent, outstanding, and maximum, with prefixes of low, medium, and high providing further granularity per NAVADMIN 061/16.

Scores for the cardio (time or calories), the curl-ups (number completed in two minutes), and the sit-ups (number completed in two minutes) are determined by age, sex, and time (for run and swim) or calories (for stationary bike).

Other branches of the DoD have similar standards.

== 2020 planned changes ==
In 2020, sit-ups were voted to be replaced with, then optional, plank exercise, which was to be fully implemented by 2021. Additionally, a rowing machine option was added to the aerobics test.

== Elite units ==
Most branches of the US military use modified, enhanced tests of the regular tests of physical stamina and performance as minimum requirements for applicants to special or elite programs. Some of these programs are SEAL, SWCC, Navy Diver, EOD, and other Special Operations Forces. These tests usually include extra components so that running, swimming, and pullups are all assessed in addition to situps, pushups, and the cardiovascular portion. In some cases pushups techniques and swim strokes may be particular to a certain group, including "diver (triceps) pushups", "combat sidestroke" swim strokes done in full uniform with boots by SEAL and SWCC applicants, and strictly monitored pull-up technique. Within these communities enhanced tests may be given in place of the regular tests, deriving and reporting the data needed for the minimum requirements of the service and maintaining additional data such as swim and pullup data to meet the requirements of their special program.

== Deaths ==
In 2019, an 18-year-old and a 20-year-old woman died due to the physical exertions of the physical tests.

== See also ==
- United States Marine Corps Physical Fitness Test - while the USN and USMC are in the Department of the Navy, their PFTs are different
