= U.S.–Japan Status of Forces Agreement =

1960 agreement between Japan and the United States

U.S.-Japan Status of Forces Agreement
Agreement Between Japan and the United States of America concerning New Special Measures Relating To article XXIV of the Agreement under Article VI of the Treaty of Mutual Cooperation and Security between Japan and the United States of America, Regarding Facilities and Areas and the Status of United States Armed Forces in Japan
- United States military bases in Japan (2010)
- Signed: 19 January 1960
- Location: Washington D.C.
- Effective: 23 June 1960
- Parties: United States; Japan
- Citations: 11 U.S.T. 1652; T.I.A.S. No. 4510
- Language: English

U.S.–Japan Status of Forces Agreement (formally, the "Agreement under Article VI of the Treaty of Mutual Cooperation and Security between Japan and the United States of America, Regarding Facilities and Areas and the Status of United States Armed Forces in Japan") is an agreement between Japan and the United States signed on 19 January 1960 in Washington, the same day as the revised U.S.-Japan Security Treaty. It is a status of forces agreement (SOFA) as stipulated in article VI of that treaty, which referred to "a separate agreement" governing the "use of [...] facilities and areas [granted to the U.S.] as well as the status of United States armed forces in Japan". It replaced the earlier "U.S.-Japan Administrative Agreement" that governed such issues under the original 1951 security treaty.

The privileges of USFJ are effectively kept with the "Agreed Minutes To The Agreement Under Article VI Of The Treaty Of Mutual Cooperation And Security Between Japan And The United States Of America, Regarding Facilities And Areas And The Status Of United States Armed Forces In Japan" and other arrangements.

== Issues ==
The SOFA has become a major political issue following instances of violent crimes allegedly committed by servicemembers. Although the Japanese court system has jurisdiction for most crimes committed by American servicemembers in Japan, there are exceptions if the American was "acting in official duty," or if the victim was another American. In those cases the American system has jurisdiction, unless it is voluntarily waived.

Additionally, some idiosyncrasies of the agreement create areas of perceived privilege for American servicemembers. For instance, because the SOFA exempts most U.S. military members from Japanese visa and passport laws, past incidents occurred in which U.S. military members were transferred back to the U.S. before facing charges in Japanese courts. Furthermore, the agreement requires that if a U.S. servicemember is suspected of a crime but is not captured outside of a base by the Japanese authorities, the U.S. authorities are to retain custody until the servicemember is formally indicted by the Japanese. Although the agreement also requires U.S. cooperation with Japanese authorities with investigations, the Japanese authorities often object that they still do not have regular access to question or interrogate U.S. servicemembers, making it difficult for Japanese prosecutors to prepare cases for indictment. This is exacerbated by the unique nature of Japanese pre-indictment interrogations, which are focused on eliciting a confession as a prerequisite for indictment, are often conducted without a lawyer, and can last as long as 23 days. Given the difference between this interrogation system and the system in the U.S., the U.S. has argued that the extraterritoriality granted its military members under the SOFA is necessary to afford them the same rights that exist under the U.S. criminal justice system.

Since the 1995 Okinawan rape incident, the U.S. has agreed to favorably consider handing over suspects in serious cases such as rape and murder before they have been charged. On 16 January 2017, Japan and the U.S. "signed a supplementary agreement to limit and clarify the definition of the civilian component protected under the Status of Forces Agreement." This agreement came after the 2016 rape and murder of an Okinawa woman, allegedly by a civilian contract worker employed at the U.S. Kadena Air Base in Okinawa Prefecture.

== Joint Committee ==
The Joint Committee is a body for consultation on all matters of this agreement, but information on them is little known because their official minutes, including their agreements, will not be published without mutual agreement.

== See also ==
- Omoiyari Yosan
- Girard Incident
- 1995 Okinawan rape incident
- Michael Brown Okinawa assault incident
- Extraterritoriality
- Japan–United States relations
- Aviation accidents in Japan involving U.S. military and government aircraft post-World War II

== Full text ==
- "Full text of the agreement" (PDF) (in English and Japanese).
- "Special measures in effect 2001–2006". Ministry of Foreign Affairs of Japan.
