= Suzuyo Takazato =

Japanese politician, feminist, and peace activist (born 1940)

Suzuyo Takazato (高里鈴代 Takazato Suzuyo, born 1940) is a Japanese politician, feminist, and peace activist. She works with female victims of sexual violence.

== Career ==
From 1989 to 2004, she was a member of the Naha city council.

Takazato founded the organization Okinawa Women Act Against Military Violence in 1995, two months after the high-profile rape incident by three US servicemen which inspired it. She contributed to the establishment of a rape crisis center in Okinawa for victims of sexual assault. She has criticized the concept of militarized security and peace forced by military intervention and analyzed the link between violence against women and military violence. She campaigns against American military bases in Okinawa. Her activism contributed to large-scale protests by Okinawa people against American military presence in 1995.

“Prostitution and rape are the military system’s outlets for pent up aggression and methods of maintaining control and discipline–the target being local community women.”

In 2005, Takazato was named on the list of 1000 PeaceWomen collectively nominated for the Nobel Peace Prize.

== Awards and recognition ==
- Takako Doi Human Rights Award, 1997
- Okinawa Times Award (2011)
