= Killing of Jennifer Laude =

Homicide of a Filipina trans woman by a US Marine

- Location: 14°49′48.1″N 120°16′51.3″E; Celzone Lodge, Olongapo, Philippines
- Date: October 11, 2014
- Attack type: Homicide, asphyxiation by drowning, hate crime
- Victim: Jennifer Laude
- Perpetrator: Joseph Scott Pemberton
- Motive: Trans panic
- Charges: Murder
- Verdict: Guilty on the lesser offense of homicide
- Sentence: 6–10 years in prison (Reduced from 6–12 years in prison); Pardoned in September 2020 by President Rodrigo Duterte

Jennifer Laude
- Facebook photo of Jennifer Laude
- Born: November 4, 1987; Philippines
- Died: October 11, 2014 (aged 26); Olongapo, Philippines
- Cause of death: Homicide by drowning

On October 11, 2014, Jennifer Laude (Tagalog pronunciation: [ˈlaʊdɛ]), a Filipina trans woman, was killed by Joseph Scott Pemberton, a Lance Corporal in the United States Marine Corps in Olongapo, Philippines. Pemberton admitted assaulting Laude and deployed a trans panic defense in his 2015 trial. His charge was downgraded from murder to homicide by a judge in 2015, and he was convicted on December 1, 2015. Philippines President Rodrigo Duterte granted an absolute pardon to Pemberton in September 2020.

This was the second reported criminal case involving a United States Marine in the Philippines under the Philippines–United States Visiting Forces Agreement (VFA) and the first since the Enhanced Defense Cooperation Agreement (EDCA). The killing spawned protests in the Philippines by transgender rights groups and other activists.

== Killing ==
Jennifer Laude, a Filipina trans woman, met Joseph Scott Pemberton, a United States Marine Corps lance corporal from New Bedford, Massachusetts at the Ambyanz disco bar in Olongapo on the evening of October 11, 2014. According to police and witnesses, they subsequently went to Celzone Lodge, a nearby motel. Thirty minutes after checking in, Pemberton left the motel, leaving the door to the room ajar. Staff found Laude's naked body, partially covered from the waist down, with her neck blackened with strangulation marks and her head in a toilet bowl. Condoms recovered from the bathroom were subjected to DNA testing to determine if the semen it contained matched that of Pemberton. Forensic experts from the U.S. Army Criminal Investigation Laboratory determined that one of the three condoms and a condom wrapper recovered from the motel room had Pemberton's fingerprints. The DNA within the condoms also did not match Laude's DNA. The cause of death was reported as "asphyxiation by drowning". Pemberton was reported to have later admitted that he choked Laude after he found out she was transgender.

Pemberton was in the Philippines to take part in regular military exercises. His ship was docked at Subic Bay Freeport, former home of the Subic Bay Naval Base, once the largest US Navy base outside the United States.

== Victim ==
Jennifer Laude was born on November 4, 1987. At the time of her death at the age of 26, she was engaged to a German national. While having a drink with her friend Barbie Gelviro at the Ambyanz Disco in Olongapo, on October 11, 2014, she met an American military foreigner and agreed to go with him to a "short time" hotel called the Celzone Lodge. Gelviro went also with her own companion, and the couples went to different rooms. Later that night Laude was found dead.

== Arrest and trial ==
Following the death of Laude, Pemberton was detained by the U.S. Navy, first on board his ship and then inside Camp Aguinaldo, the headquarters of the Armed Forces of the Philippines, located in Quezon City, Metro Manila.

On December 15, 2014, the Olongapo City Prosecutor's Office of the Philippine Department of Justice found probable cause to charge Pemberton with murder and that day he was charged with murder in front of the Olongapo City Regional Trial Court Branch 74. The prosecutor decided to pursue murder charges because of the "presence of treachery, cruelty, and abuse of superior strength". Pemberton appealed the prosecutor's decision to the Secretary of Justice, but that appeal was denied. On February 23, 2015, Pemberton was brought to court in Olongapo and the court entered a not-guilty plea on his behalf. The pre-trial hearings began February 27, 2015. The murder trial began on March 16. Under the VFA, the local courts have one year to complete any legal proceedings.

Pemberton was represented by Rowena Flores, and the trial was heard by Judge Roline Ginez-Jabalde.

Reporters were banned from the courtroom and relied upon second-hand reports from the Laude family's lawyers for their news articles.

Laude's relatives said they had been offered 21 million Philippine pesos (US$468,000) if they agreed to lower the charge from murder to homicide. Julita Cabillan, Laude's mother, said they had rejected the offer, since "No amount of money could pay for the years I spent raising my child". One of Pemberton's lawyers, Benjamin Tolosa, insisted that Pemberton's legal team had not offered any money, saying "It has been insinuated the demand came from us and that's absolutely false. It's contrary to what happened".

Lawyers for the Laude family claimed that prosecutor Emilie Fe de los Santos had taken a statement by Laude's mother that she would not drop the case even if offered a million dollars as a sign that the family was open to a plea bargain, insisting the prosecutor had promoted that idea with defense attorneys.

One of the Laude family's attorneys, Harry Roque, told the press that he had been barred by Prosecutor de los Santos from the trial. Laude's family submitted a letter to Department of Justice Secretary Leila De Lima requesting that a new prosecutor be assigned, citing the refusal of de los Santos to work with the family's private lawyers. The prosecution rested on June 30, 2015.

Pemberton admitted in court to fighting with Laude, but not to killing her. He claimed he acted in "self-defense" after he discovered Laude was transgender.

=== Court decision ===
On December 1, 2015, the Olongapo Regional Trial Court found Pemberton guilty of homicide, citing mitigating circumstances including Laude not revealing her biological sex, and sentenced him to 6 to 12 years in jail. The court said, "The killing of Laude amounted only to homicide" and did not meet the standards for murder. Pemberton, in the court's view, acted out of "passion and obfuscation". The court ruled Pemberton that "in the heat of passion, he arm-locked the deceased, and dunked her head in the toilet." Harry Roque, the family's attorney, disagreed, saying "It is not right that these mitigating circumstances showed his bigotry towards a transgender woman and that the bigotry itself was the reason he killed her." Laude's mother, Julita Laude, also was not happy, saying she believed Pemberton was guilty of murder. Still, she added, "But the important thing is he will be jailed. My daughter's life is not wasted."

Pemberton remained at Camp Aguinaldo and under the Bureau of Corrections control until the appeals were heard. Pemberton was ordered to pay fines to the Laude family totaling over 4.5 million Philippine pesos: 50,000 pesos for civil indemnities, 4,320,000 pesos for loss of earning capacity, 155,250 pesos for funeral and burial expenses, 50,000 pesos for moral damages, and 30,000 pesos for exemplary damages.

In a ruling issued by the Olongapo RTC Branch 74 on March 30, 2016, the court affirmed the conviction of Pemberton, while reducing the maximum sentence to 10 years from the original 12 years and also denying him bail.

=== Early release and absolute pardon ===
On September 2, 2020, Branch 74 of the Olongapo City Regional Trial Court granted Pemberton's partial motion of reconsideration, thereby releasing him from prison. Judge Roline Ginez-Abalde said that Pemberton, then confined at the Armed Forces of the Philippines Custodial Center in Camp Aguinaldo, Quezon City, had already served a jail sentence of ten years, one month, and ten days on account of his accumulated Good Conduct Time Allowance (GCTA). The Laude camp opposed the decision, saying, "Pemberton, who lives comfortably and only his liberty is restricted—cannot reasonably and justifiably claim good conduct”.

On September 7, 2020, President Rodrigo Duterte granted an absolute pardon to Pemberton, which was justified by his spokesman Harry Roque, who was once a legal counsel for the Laude family. Prior to this, Duterte had promised to the Laude family that he will not release Pemberton during his presidency. Roque believed Duterte's decision to pardon Pemberton was to allow the Philippines to gain access to Western-made COVID-19 vaccines. The pardon, which was condemned by the Laude family, sparked outrage in the LGBT community, as well as high-profile personalities from senators to celebrities. The hashtag #JusticeForJenniferLaude landed on the top trending spot in social media, where majority of the posts were critical of Duterte.

The absolute pardon given by Duterte has been called "a grave injustice to the Filipino people", "a travesty of Philippine sovereignty and democracy", "a mockery of [the] judiciary and legal system", and "a shameless sell-out". The pardon has also been analyzed as an act that "plac[es] the interests of the US government above the Filipino people's demands for justice and accountability". The lawyer of Pemberton later claimed that her client "always wanted to apologize" to Laude's family. The claims were afterwards debunked by the lawyer of the Laude family, who stated that since 2014, Pemberton never initiated any form of an apology. Pemberton's lawyer has stated that her client's reaction to the pardon was "very happy", and that she advised Pemberton to apologize through a letter, instead of speaking personally with the Laude family. On September 13, 2020, Pemberton was deported to the United States, after he had allegedly apologized to the victim's family and thanked Duterte for the pardon. He is expected to enroll in a college in the United States.

On September 14, 2020, during the daily COVID-19 press briefing, Philippine presidential spokesman Harry Roque claimed that according to US authorities and the American Marine Corps, Pemberton would be facing a 'court martial' upon his return in the United States. The court martial would determine additional punishment for Pemberton and whether he is qualified to remain in service.

== Reactions ==
The case has the potential to damage Philippines–United States relations. The VFA, complemented by the EDCA and by annual military exercises known as Balikatan, were put under greater scrutiny as several protests were organized in the Philippines and the United States calling for the Philippines to cancel both agreements.

This is the second reported criminal case involving a United States Marine in the Philippines under the VFA. In 2005, four Marines were tried in the Philippines for rape in what became known as the Subic rape case. Three were acquitted at trial and the fourth was convicted at trial but later acquitted on appeal after victim "Nicole" recanted her testimony by saying the rape never happened and immediately emigrated to the United States.

Transgender rights activists and the left-wing Bagong Alyansang Makabayan have protested what they see as the "special treatment" of U.S. troops, such as Pemberton, in the Philippines, compared to the second-class citizen treatment of Filipinos, such as Laude, in their own land, which they characterize as neo-colonialism. The Communist Party of the Philippines condemned the United States' refusal to turn over full custody of Pemberton to Philippine authorities and called for the abolition of the VFA, which the party views as lopsided to US military interests and as violative of Philippine sovereignty. The communist group also views that the Philippine government refuses to fully assert full jurisdiction on the case. The Philippines was a territory of the United States from 1898 to 1946.

The case has also prompted a discussion on transgender rights. A columnist for The Philippine Star wrote that the case provides for an "opportunity to further gender sensitivity, promote LGBT rights, and encourage tolerance and acceptance."

In 2018, director PJ Raval released the documentary Call Her Ganda, following the three women intimately invested in the case: an activist attorney, a transgender journalist and Laude's mother.

On October 11, 2024, the 10th anniversary of Laude's murder, the UP Cinema, activists and League of Filipino Students held a candlelight vigil at the UP Oblation after the film screening of PJ Raval's documentary Call Her Ganda.

== See also ==
- Subic rape case
- United States bases in the Philippines
- LGBT culture in the Philippines
- Killing of Michael Ovsjannikov, death of a German civilian by a U.S. airman stationed in Germany
- Girard incident, killing of a Japanese civilian by a U.S. Army soldier
- Murder of Yoshie Sato, death of a Japanese civilian by a U.S. Navy airman stationed in Japan
- Murder of Yun Geum-i, murder of a South Korean civilian by a U.S. serviceman in Korea
