= Murder of Yoshie Sato =

Murder of a 57-year-old woman by a U.S. sailor in Yokosuka, Japan

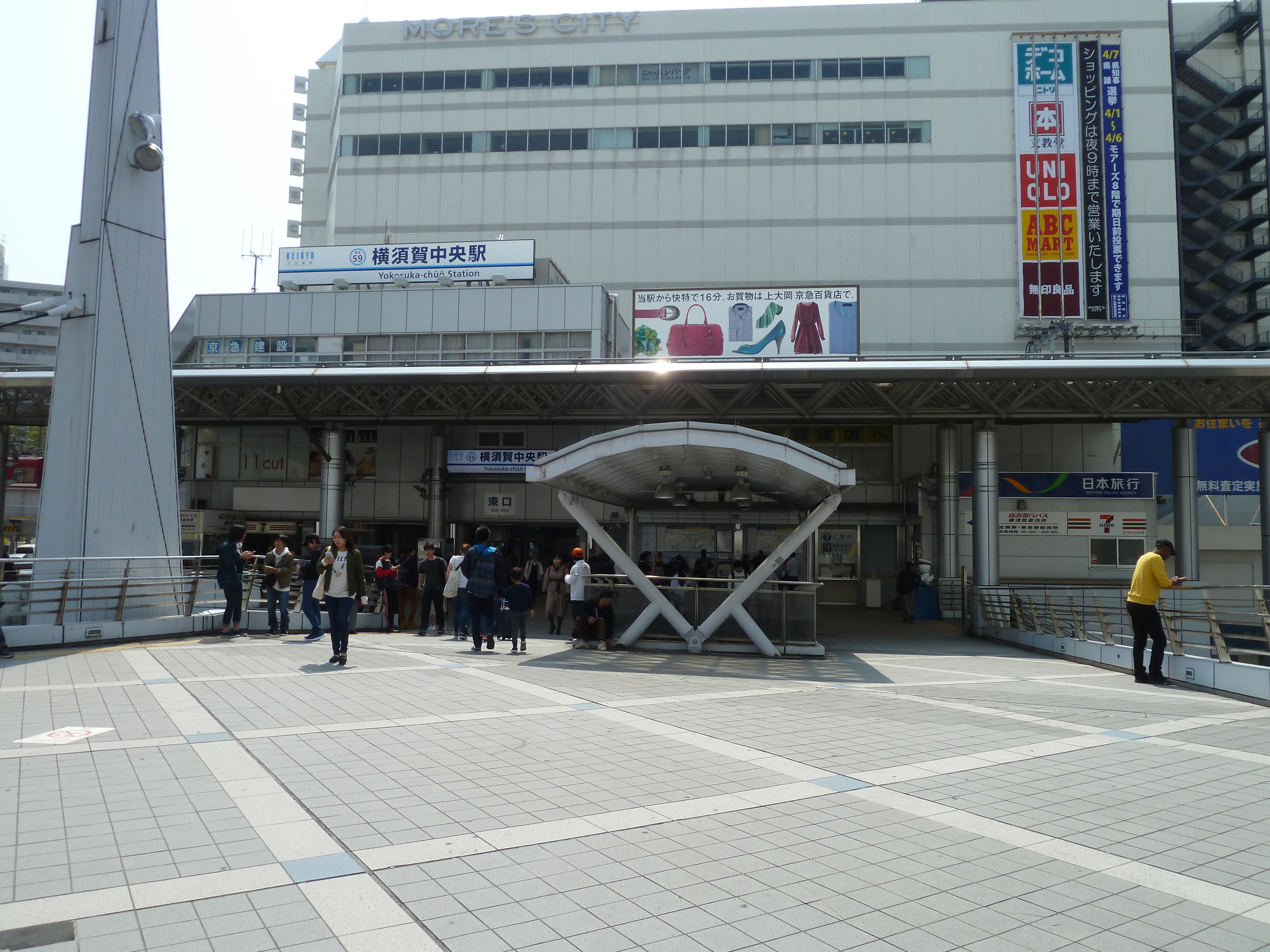
- Yokosuka-Chuo station, near to where the incident took place
- Location: Yokosuka, Kanagawa, Japan
- Date: 3 January 2006; 20 years ago c. 6:00 a.m. (JST)
- Attack type: Beating, robbery
- Victim: Yoshie Sato
- Perpetrator: William Oliver Reese
- Convictions: Murder

On 3 January 2006, 56-year-old Yoshie Sato was murdered by 21-year-old William Oliver Reese in Yokosuka, Japan. Reese was a United States Navy sailor stationed on the USS Kitty Hawk (CV-63) at the time and confessed to the crime. Reese is currently serving life in prison in Japan. The killing led to public calls for a revision of the U.S.–Japan Status of Forces Agreement, which had previously occurred following other incidents of killing and rape by U.S. military personnel.

== Background ==
Yoshie Sato (Japanese: 佐藤好恵; née Sanada, 真田) was born in Yokosuka on 28 February 1949, as the eldest of three children. Following her second divorce and the death of her parents, she entered a common-law relationship and bought an apartment together with her fiancé. She had three children and six grandchildren. Sato was employed as a bus cleaner and despite the three-day holiday season for Japanese New Year, Sato had been on her way to work at the time of her death.

William Oliver Reese was born in Pittsgrove, New Jersey, United States, to an African-American family. He held the rank of seaman and had been stationed in Japan since 2004 on his first assignment.

== Murder ==
On 3 January 2006, William Oliver Reese was near the Yokosuka-Chūō train station when he accosted 56-year-old Yoshie Sato, demanding money. Reese was intoxicated at the time. At first, he asked her for directions to the nearby naval base, and after she pointed it out to him, he attempted to take her purse. When Sato began yelling for help, Reese dragged her to a nearby stairwell and beat her for 11 minutes. Sato later died of a ruptured kidney. The initial robbery attempt was recorded on surveillance footage.

He then removed 15,000 yen (equivalent to $131) from her purse and left the scene. Some accounts claim that Reese was apprehended by US Navy sentries at the main gate to Yokosuka Naval Base, who became suspicious when they noticed Reese's bloodstained clothes. Other accounts state that he was caught aboard the Kitty Hawk as he attempted to return to work. Reese claimed that he had no idea why he killed her.

== International repercussions ==
Reese was indicted and made a full confession. He pled guilty, but claimed that he had not intended to kill Sato. Reese was convicted on 3 June 2006 and sentenced to life imprisonment. While judges called the murder "shocking" and "dreadful," they cited Reese's confession, among other factors, as their justification for sparing him from a possible death sentence.

A U.S. Navy official issued an apology on behalf of the United States during Sato's funeral. Sato's brother Shuichi Sanada stated that they wished that the military educated its troops more to prevent "a serious social problem". Sato's youngest son Katsuki said that he was hoping for the death penalty for Reese, but otherwise held no ill will against the navy.

On 6 January 2006, restrictions were enacted by the U.S. Navy upon its sailors stationed in Yokosuka. The CNFJ, which blamed the attack on unregulared alcohol abuse, issued a four-day "period of reflection" for American military personnel in Japan, which included a curfew and ban for personnel regarding city entry for personnel of Yokosuka Naval Base and Naval Air Facility Atsugi, as well as detailed "liberty plans," written statements of a sailor's exact whereabouts throughout the day.

Sato's murder was considered the most severe of a number of highly publicised violent crimes committed by U.S. servicemen, which included a hit-and-run that injured three elementary school students in Hachioji by another USS Kitty Hawk sailor, as well as an assault on a taxi driver in Yokohama by a drunk U.S. Navy petty officer.

In October 2006, the Sato family filed a civil lawsuit against the Japanese government, the U.S. Navy and William Reese for 200 million yen (equivalent to $1,700,000), citing a NATO status of forces provision for victim compensation. In 2013, the Supreme Court of Japan ruled that Reese would pay the demanded sum, as only he could be held liable for the crime. Sato's husband, Masanori Yamazaki, criticised U.S. officials for framing the murder as "a chance to make the Japan-U.S. alliance even stronger". As Reese was unable to pay the compensation, the American government offered to pay 40% of the originally agreed sum to Yamazaki, which he refused on account of the settlement including a clause absolving the United States and Reese of further liability. In 2017, Yamazaki agreed to sign the document if the demand for immunity was dropped. As of 2020, no updates had been made regarding the settlement.

== See also ==
- 1995 Okinawa rape incident, gang rape of a 12-year-old Okinawan girl by three U.S. servicemen
- Girard incident, killing of a Japanese civilian by a U.S. Army soldier
- Killing of Michael Ovsjannikov, death of German civilian by a U.S. airman
- Murder of Yun Geum-i, murder of a South Korean civilian by a U.S. serviceman in Korea
- Killing of Jennifer Laude, death of a Filipina civilian by a U.S. Marine
