= Girard incident =

1957 killing of a Japanese civilian by an American soldier

- Native name: ジラード事件; Jirādo jiken
- Date: January 30, 1957
- Location: Sōmagahara Air Base, Soma, Gunma Prefecture, Japan
- Type: Shooting of a Japanese civilian
- Participants: William S. Girard, United States Army Specialist 3/C
- Outcome: Large scale protests in Japan; Diplomatic incident between the U.S. and Japan; Reduction of U.S. troops based in Japan
- Charges: Murder
- Convictions: Manslaughter
- Sentence: 3-year suspended sentence for Girard
- Litigation: Wilson v. Girard

The Girard incident (ジラード事件, Jirādo jiken) was the killing of Japanese civilian Naka Sakai by United States Army soldier William S. Girard in Soma, Gunma Prefecture, on January 30, 1957. Sakai, a housewife who was collecting spent shell casings at a military base to sell for scrap, was killed when Girard shot an empty grenade cartridge at her, apparently for his own amusement. Sakai's death caused outrage from the Japanese public and the incident led to disputes between Japan and the U.S. Army over jurisdiction, resulting in the U.S. Supreme Court case Wilson v. Girard. Girard was demoted by the U.S. Army and received a three-year suspended sentence from Japanese authorities.

== Incident ==
On January 30, 1957, Naka Sakai, a 46-year-old Japanese housewife and mother of six, entered Sōmagahara Air Base in Soma, Gunma Prefecture, for the purpose of collecting spent shell casings to sell as scrap metal. At the time, Sōmagahara was used by the U.S. Forces Japan for live-fire exercises, and local residents would collect metal from spent ammunition to earn a living. Specialist Third Class William S. Girard, a 21-year-old enlisted man from Ottawa, Illinois, used a grenade launcher mounted on an M1 Garand rifle to fire an empty grenade cartridge at Sakai, which hit her in the back and killed her.

== Extradition controversy ==
The strong Japanese outcry over the killing precipitated a major diplomatic crisis between the United States and Japan and led to a jurisdictional dispute between the Japanese authorities and the U.S. Army over who had the right to put Girard on trial for Sakai's killing. The U.S. Army maintained that Girard had acted while on "active duty" and was thus under the jurisdiction of U.S. military courts in accordance with the terms of the U.S.-Japan Security Treaty. The Japanese government, however, held that Girard's actions had taken place during a period of rest, making him subject to Japanese law. Girard had been assigned to guard a machine gun at the firing range in between sessions of target practice; the Japanese contention was that since Girard had not fired a weapon during exercises, he could not be considered as on active duty. Eventually, Secretary of State John Foster Dulles and Secretary of Defense Charles E. Wilson, fearing that trampling on Japanese feelings would jeopardize the status of crucial U.S. military bases in Japan, ruled that Girard's specific action "was not authorized", and he was turned over to the Japanese authorities for trial. Girard appealed this decision to the U.S. Supreme Court, but the court declined to intervene, in the case Wilson v. Girard.

American domestic response to Girard's extradition was largely negative, sparking an intense political and media backlash against the Eisenhower administration. Relatives and supporters in his Illinois hometown drummed up 182 feet of signatures for a petition decrying the decision, the American Legion protested vociferously, the Veterans of Foreign Wars said that Girard had been "sold down the river", Senator John Bricker of Ohio called the decision a matter of "sacrificing an American soldier to appease Japanese public opinion", and the New York Daily News summed up its feelings in a headline: "To the Wolves, Soldier". In the midst of the uproar, The New York Times, fearing that American reaction was eroding the good will earned in Asia by the initial decision to extradite, published an article lauding the positive interactions between most U.S. soldiers and Japanese civilians, including photographs of soldiers celebrating Christmas with a Japanese family while clothed in traditional Japanese attire.

== Trial ==
At the trial, a Japanese witness for the prosecution asserted that Girard had yelled a warning to Sakai before firing, but Girard himself denied ever having done so, a statement which shocked and mystified observers. According to testimony from Victor Nickel, a soldier of the same rank who had accompanied him, Girard had lured Sakai and other scavengers toward his position by tossing empty casings out onto the range, then fired at Sakai "for a joke". Girard claimed that the death had been an accident. The presiding judge, Yuzo Kawachi, went so far as to visit the scene of the incident himself, and pronounced himself "baffled" by the discrepancies in Girard's account of events. However, he stated that he could find "no evidence of deliberate murder", and Girard was handed only a three-year suspended sentence. He was also demoted to private status by the U.S. Army as a result of his actions; had he been found guilty of murder, he would have been dishonorably discharged.

== Aftermath and legacy ==
The massive popular outcry in Japan over the Girard incident led directly to the Eisenhower administration announcing a 40 percent draw down in the number of U.S. troops stationed on Japanese soil, significantly easing tensions between the two nations and reducing local conflicts over military bases. It also helped persuade the Eisenhower administration to agree to a renegotiation of the U.S.–Japan Security Treaty along lines of greater mutuality with Japan, thus solidifying the U.S.–Japan Alliance.

Girard himself, who was recorded as having an IQ of 90, was held in little regard by his fellow soldiers, widely viewed as a "bumpkin clown" who drank to excess and ran up debts at various Japanese establishments. After his trial, he went home to North America with his Taiwanese-born Japanese bride, Haru "Candy" Sueyama, and was booed by fellow servicemen during his return trip. He died in 1999.

Sakai's widowed husband, Akikichi, and his six children were compensated with a mere US$1,748.32 ($20,041 in 2025) for their loss, but this monetary offer was perceived as an attempt to buy off justice by many Japanese, and Akikichi stated to U.S. authorities that "I do not thank you for it."

== See also ==
- Murder of Yoshie Sato, murder of a Japanese civilian by a U.S. navy airman in Japan
- Murder of Yun Geum-i, murder of a South Korean civilian by a U.S. serviceman in Korea
- Killing of Jennifer Laude, death of a Filipina civilian by a U.S. Marine
