= U.S.–Japan alliance =

International military alliance

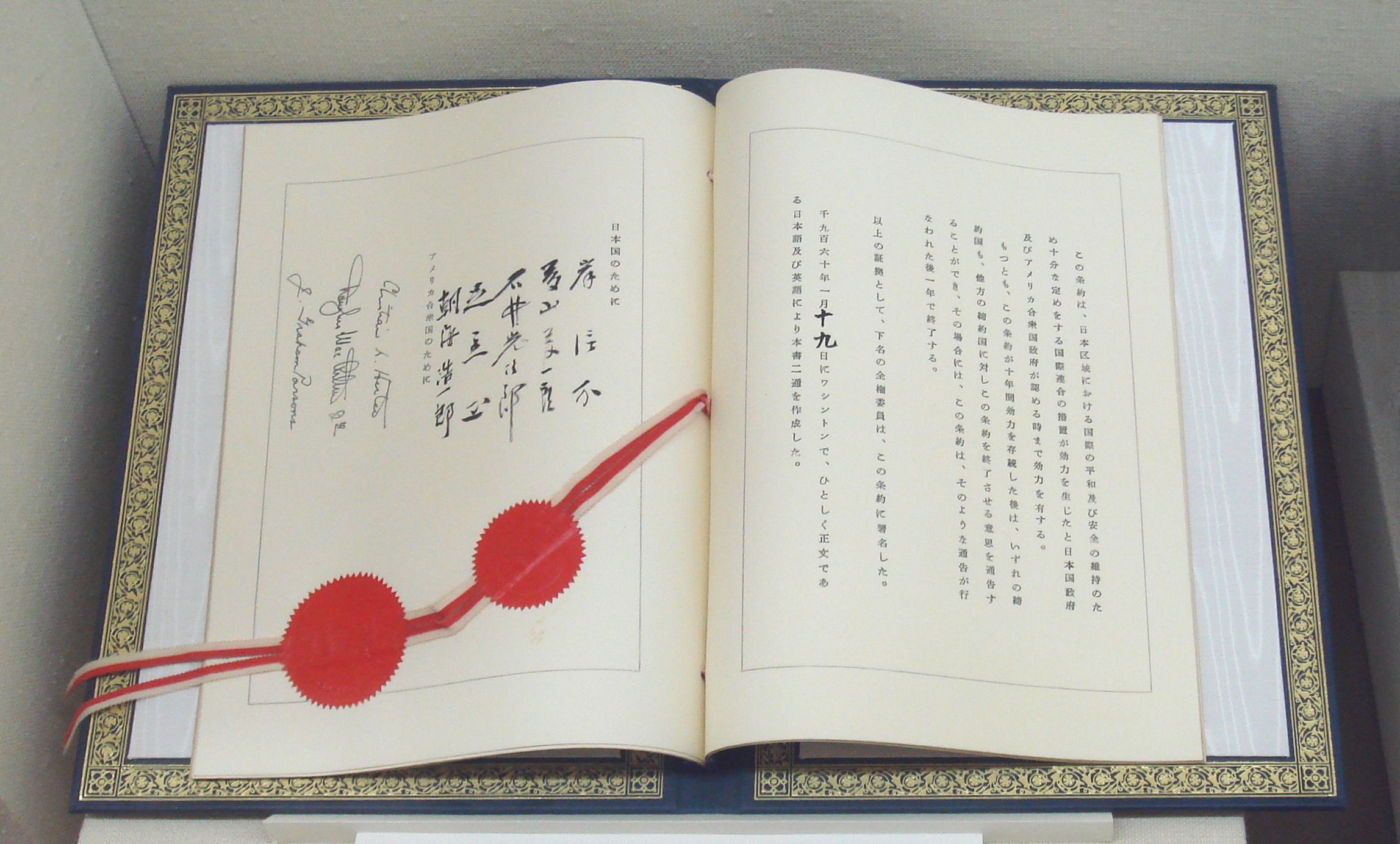
Signature page of the Treaty of Mutual Cooperation and Security between the United States and Japan (Japanese-language copy)

The U.S.–Japan alliance (日米同盟, Nichi-Bei Dōmei) is a military alliance between Japan and the United States, as codified in the Treaty of Mutual Cooperation and Security between the United States and Japan, which was first signed in 1951, took effect in 1952, and was amended in 1960. The alliance has been further codified in a series of "administrative" agreements, "status of forces" agreements, and secret pacts (Japanese: 密約, romanized: mitsuyaku) that have not been subject to legislative review in either country.

Under the terms of the alliance, the United States undertakes to defend Japan in case of attack by a third power. In return, Japan allows American troops to be stationed on Japanese soil, and makes sizable "sympathy payments" to underwrite the cost of the U.S. bases it hosts. Excluding the U.S. itself, Japan is home to more American troops than any other country. In practice, the commitment to defend Japan from attack includes extending the United States's "nuclear umbrella" to encompass the Japanese archipelago.

The two nations also share defense technology on a limited basis, work to ensure interoperability of their respective military forces, and frequently participate in joint military exercises.

Although Article 9 of Japan's Constitution forbids Japan from maintaining offensive military capabilities, Japan has supported large-scale U.S. military operations such as the Gulf War, the war in Afghanistan, and the Iraq War with monetary contributions and dispatch of noncombat ground forces.

== U.S.-Japan Relations in Early 20th Century (1900-1920) ==
During the early 20th century, the United States and Japan had constant rising and falling tensions as well as agreements and disagreements. While the U.S. recognized Japanese rule over Korea and Taiwan and Japan recognized the Philippines to be under the U.S., America worried about Japanese expansion and increasing control over China. Meanwhile, Japan was frustrated over American treatment of and discrimination against Japanese immigrants. Japan's problem with America was solved in 1908 with an agreement to no longer segregate Japanese students in America if Japan restricted immigration to the United States. The two countries recognized each other's territorial possessions, but the continued bad treatment of Japanese nationals in America increased tensions. To prevent further conflict over Japan attempting to increase control over China, the two sides formed another agreement in 1917 where America recognized Japan's control over Manchuria and Japan would not block U.S. opportunities in China; however, this was short-lived. The League of Nations negotiations also yielded no agreement. In the end, Japan and America could not come to terms on racial equality and expansion in China. Relations continued to deteriorate in the 1930s with Japan's invasion of China, Pearl Harbor, and World War II; Japan's defeat eventually leading to the modern-day U.S.-Japan alliance.

== Formation ==
The U.S.-Japan alliance was forced on Japan as a condition of ending the U.S.-led military occupation of Japan (1945–1952). The original U.S.-Japan Security Treaty was signed on September 8, 1951, in tandem with the signing of the San Francisco Peace Treaty ending World War II in Asia, and took effect in conjunction with the official end of the occupation on April 28, 1952.

The original Security Treaty had no specified end date or means of abrogation, allowed US forces stationed in Japan to be used for any purpose without prior consultation with the Japanese government, had a clause specifically authorizing US troops to put down domestic protests in Japan, and did not commit the United States to defend Japan if Japan were to be attacked by a third party.

Because the original treaty was so one-sided, it was the target of protests in Japan throughout the 1950s, most notably the "Bloody May Day" protests of May 1, 1952, and Japanese leaders constantly entreated U.S. leaders to revise it.

=== The Yoshida Doctrine ===
The Yoshida Doctrine was a strategy adopted by Japan under Prime Minister Shigeru Yoshida, who served from 1948 to 1954. He concentrated upon reconstructing Japan's domestic economy while relying heavily on the security alliance with the United States. The Yoshida Doctrine emerged in 1951 and it shaped Japanese foreign policy into the 21st century. First, Japan is firmly allied with the United States in the Cold War against Communism. Second, Japan relies on American military strength and limits its own defense forces to a minimum. Third, Japan emphasizes economic diplomacy in its world affairs. The Yoshida doctrine was accepted by the United States; the actual term was coined in 1977. Its economic dimension was fostered by Hayato Ikeda who served as finance minister and later as prime minister. Most historians argue the policy was wise and successful, but a minority criticize it as naïve and inappropriate.

== 1950s anti-base protests in Japan ==
Even after the occupation ended in 1952, the United States maintained large numbers of military troops on Japanese soil. In the mid-1950s there were still 260,000 troops in Japan, utilizing 2,824 facilities throughout the nation (excluding U.S.-occupied Okinawa), and occupying land totaling 1,352 square kilometres (522 sq mi).

The large number of bases and U.S. military personnel produced frictions with the local population and led to a series of contentious anti-base protests, including the Uchinada protests of 1952–1953, the Sunagawa Struggle of 1955–1957, and the Girard incident of 1957.

The growing size and scope of these disturbances helped convince the administration of U.S. President Dwight D. Eisenhower to significantly reduce the number of U.S. troops stationed in mainland Japan (while retaining large numbers of troops in Okinawa) and to finally renegotiate the terms of the U.S.-Japan alliance.

== 1960 treaty revision crisis ==
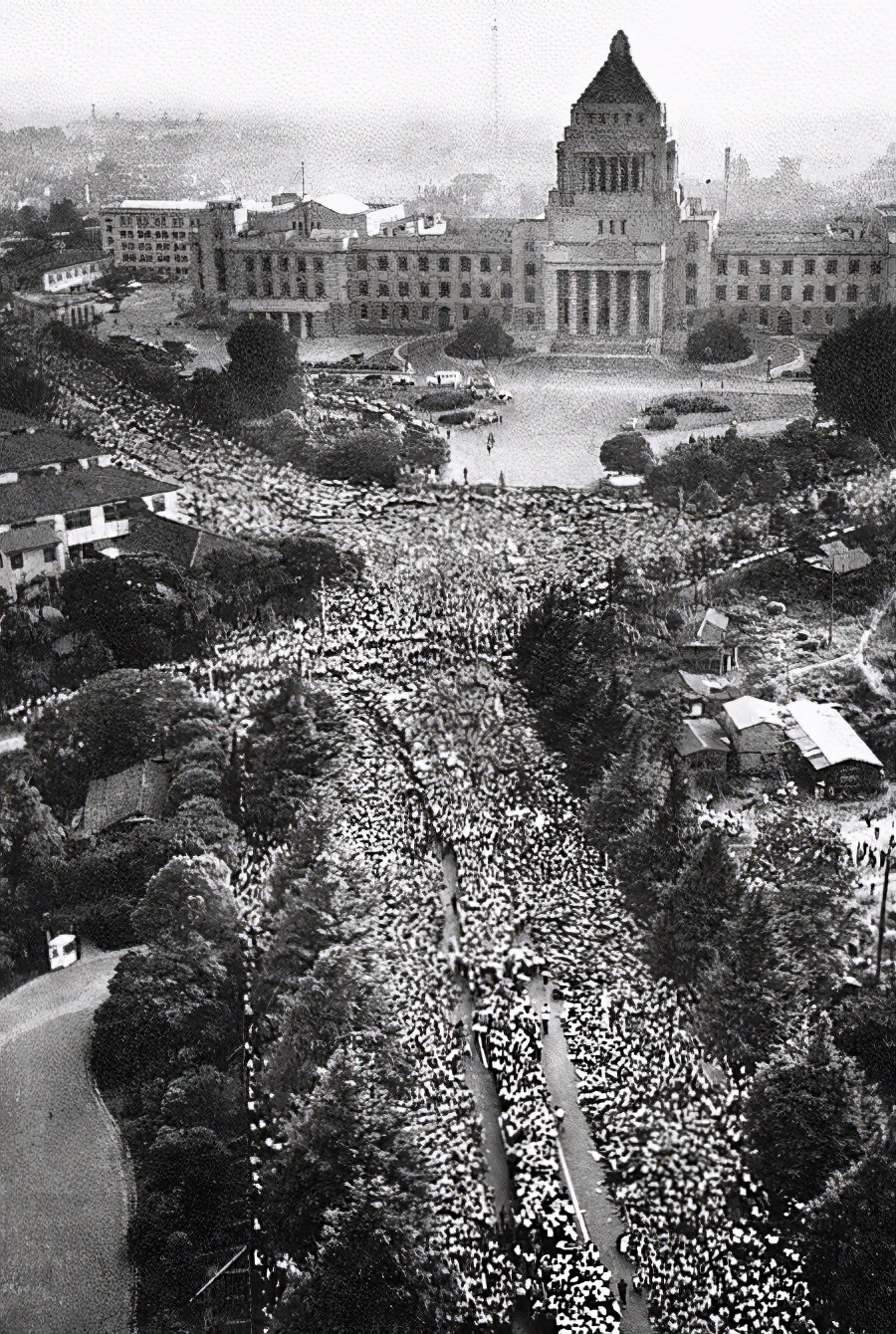
Mass protests against revision of the U.S.-Japan Security Treaty, June 18, 1960

In 1960, the government of Japanese prime minister Nobusuke Kishi attempted to pass the revised Security Treaty through the Japanese Diet but was met with mass protests.

The revised treaty was a significant change in comparison to the original treaty, committing the United States to defend Japan in an attack, requiring prior consultation with the Japanese government before dispatching U.S. forces based in Japan overseas, removing the clause preauthorizing suppression of domestic disturbances, and specifying an initial 10-year term, after which the treaty could be abrogated by either party with one year's notice.

However, many Japanese people, especially on the left, but also even some on the center and the right of the political spectrum, preferred to chart a more neutral course in the Cold War, and thus decided to oppose treaty revision as means of expressing their opposition to the U.S.-Japan alliance as a whole.

When Kishi rammed the treaty through the Diet despite popular opposition, the protests escalated dramatically in size, forcing Kishi to resign as well as to cancel a planned visit by Eisenhower to Japan to celebrate the new treaty, leading to a low point in U.S.-Japan relations.

Kishi and Eisenhower were succeeded by Hayato Ikeda and John F. Kennedy, respectively, who worked to repair the damage to the U.S.-Japan alliance. Kennedy and his new ambassador to Japan, Edwin O. Reischauer, pushed a new rhetoric of "equal partnership" and sought to place the alliance on a more equal footing. Ikeda and Kennedy also held a summit meeting in Washington D.C. in June 1961, at which Ikeda promised greater Japanese support for U.S. Cold War policies, and Kennedy promised to treat Japan more like a close trusted ally, similar to how the United States treated Great Britain.

== Secret pacts in the 1960s–1970s ==
In an effort to prevent the type of crisis that attended the revision of the Security Treaty in 1960 from happening again, both Japanese and American leaders found it more convenient going forward to alter the terms of the U.S.–Japan alliance by resort to secret pacts rather than formal revisions that would need legislative approval.

In the early 1960s, Ambassador Reischauer negotiated secret agreements whereby the Japanese government allowed U.S. naval vessels to carry nuclear weapons even when transiting Japanese bases, and also to release limited amounts of radioactive wastewater into Japanese harbors.

Similarly, as part of the negotiations over the reversion of Okinawa to Japan in the late 1960s, Japanese prime minister Eisaku Satō and U.S. president Richard Nixon made a secret agreement that even after Okinawa reverted to Japanese control, the U.S. could still introduce nuclear weapons to U.S. bases in Okinawa in times of emergency, which was a contravention of Satō's publicly stated "Three Non-Nuclear Principles".

== Japanese participation in the U.S. wars in the Middle East ==
In 1990, the United States called on Japan for assistance in the Gulf War. However, Japan's interpretation of its constitution at the time forbade the overseas deployment of military troops. Consequently, Japan contributed $9 billion in monetary support instead, which was criticized by the US as "checkbook diplomacy". This occurred during a critical crossroads in US–Japan relations; the end of the Cold War had eliminated the primary justification for their wartime military partnership, while peaking trade competition and massive U.S. deficits with Japan triggered intense political rhetoric and protectionist pressure in Washington D.C. during the late 1980s and early 1990s.

In between the Gulf War and the start of the Iraq War in 2003, the Japanese government revised its interpretation of the Constitution, and thus during the Iraq War, Japan was able to dispatch noncombat ground forces in a logistical support role in support of U.S. operations in Iraq. For reconstruction effort and humanitarian aid purposes, 600 Ground Self-Defense troops were deployed to Samawah, Iraq, and 200 Air Self-Defense troops to an air base in Kuwait.

Additionally, Japan extended logistical support to the U.S. during its war on Afghanistan, deploying its Maritime Self-Defense Forces to the Indian Ocean to provide fuel for coalition forces, including helicopters, in addition to resupplying water. Volunteers and specialists were sent by Japan for reconstruction efforts. They also facilitated talks between Afghanistan and other nations.

For both Iraq and Afghanistan, Japan was a major contributor in terms of humanitarian and reconstruction efforts.

== Current views of the U.S.–Japan alliance in Japan ==
Although views of the U.S.–Japan alliance were negative in Japan when it was first formed in the 1950s, acceptance of the alliance has grown over time. According to a 2007 poll, 73.4% of Japanese citizens appreciated the U.S.–Japan alliance and welcomed the presence of U.S. forces in Japan.

However, one area where antipathy toward the alliance remains high is Okinawa, which has a much higher concentration of U.S. bases than other parts of Japan, and where protest activity against the alliance remains strong. Okinawa, a relatively small island, is home to 32 separate U.S. military bases comprising 74.7% of bases in Japan, with nearly 20% of Okinawan land taken up by the bases. A recent 2022 poll shows that around 70% of Okinawa residents dislike that U.S. bases are so heavily concentrated in Okinawa, expressing concerns that their island would be targeted in case of an attack. While some residents believe the U.S. military will be able to defend them, others feel that protecting Okinawa is not a priority for the U.S. Okinawan residents have also often been victim to sexual crimes by U.S. stationed troops throughout the U.S.-Japan Alliance, most infamously in 1995 when an elementary-aged girl was raped by American soldiers, prompting mass protest. 350 crimes were committed against Okinawan women by U.S. soldiers in a 65 year span, with incidents and protests continuing to pop up. 2025 was a 20-year record high in crimes by U.S. personnel in Okinawa.

After the end of the Cold War, Japan is the country with the largest number of U.S. troops outside the United States, approximately 55,000 in 2021. U.S. forces in Japan are under the command of United States Forces Japan.

Japanese and U.S. defense chiefs and diplomats met in Tokyo on 28 July 2024 to enhance military cooperation and missile production amid rising threats from China. They reaffirmed their alliance and addressed regional security concerns involving China and North Korea. In January 2025, Japan's Shigeru Ishiba, the Philippines' Bongbong Marcos, and the United States' Joe Biden pledged to deepen their trilateral arrangements due to rising tensions in Asia's waters. They agreed to enhance economic and technological cooperation. At the White House, the three leaders discussed China's "dangerous and unlawful behavior in the South China Sea". In January 2026, Japan and the U.S. agreed to expand joint military training across the first island chain.

== See also ==
- Japan–United States relations
- Anglo-Japanese Alliance
- Occupation of Japan
- Postwar Japan
- Security Treaty between the United States and Japan (1952–1960)
- Treaty of Mutual Cooperation and Security between the United States and Japan (1960–present)
- United States Forces Japan
- Nuclear umbrella
- Sunagawa Struggle
- Girard incident
- Anpo protests
- Omoiyari Yosan
