= Bloody May =

Bloody May or Bloody May Day may refer to:

== Historical events ==
- Blutmai, a 1929 riot between the Communist Party of Germany and the Berlin Police
- Black May (1992), a popular name for the 17–20 May 1992 protest in Bangkok, Thailand
- Bloody May Day (1952), a 1952 riot between Japanese protesters and the Tokyo Police
- Bloody May Day (1977), a 1977 massacre in Istanbul, Turkey
