= Security Treaty between the United States and Japan =

1952 treaty for US military presence in Japan

U.S.-Japan Security Treaty
Security Treaty between the United States and Japan
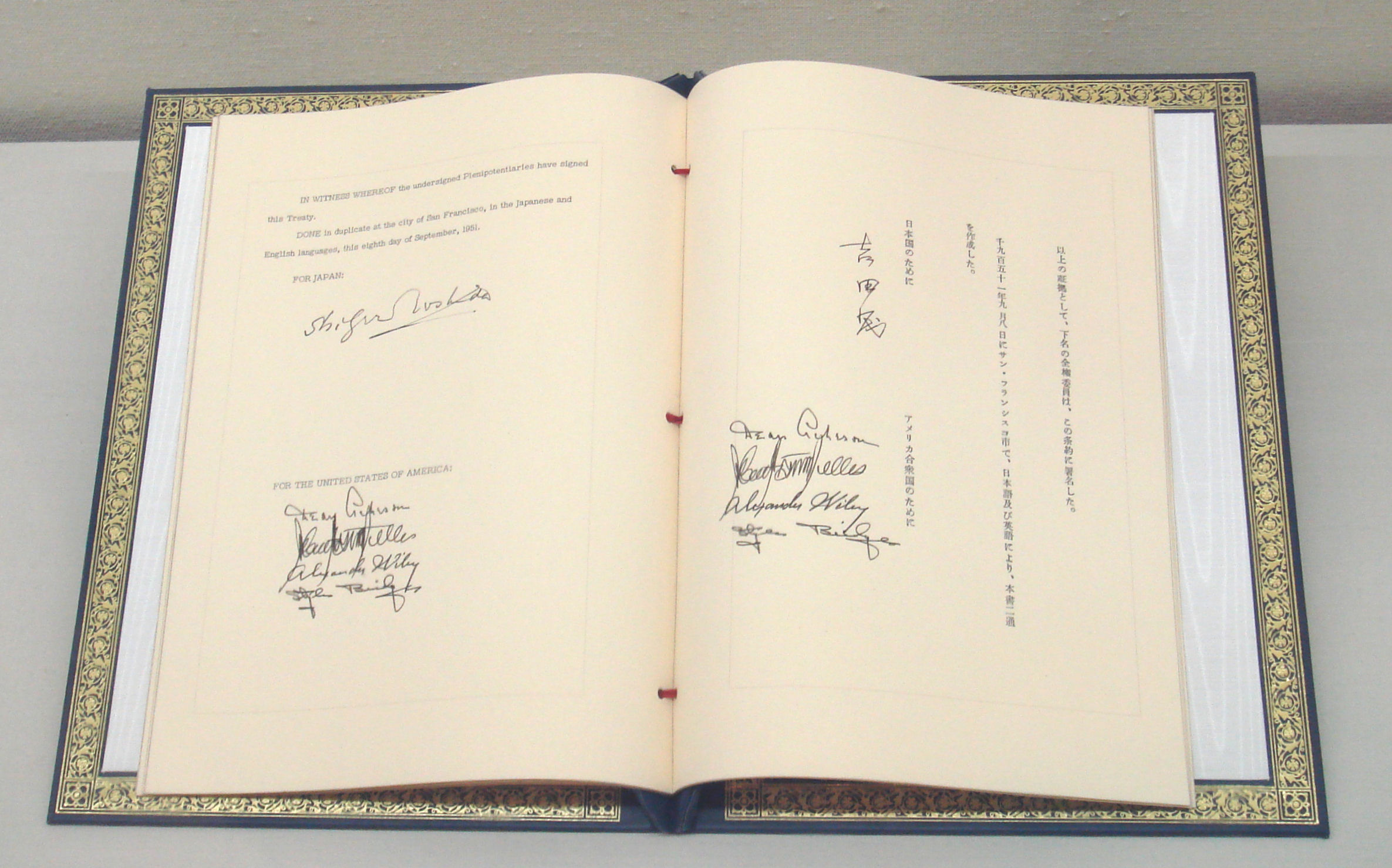
- Type: Military alliance
- Signed: September 8, 1951
- Location: San Francisco, United States
- Effective: April 28, 1952
- Expiration: June 23, 1960 (revised and replaced)
- Parties: United States; Japan

The Security Treaty between the United States and Japan (日本国とアメリカ合衆国との間の安全保障条約, Nippon-koku to Amerika Gasshūkoku to no aida no anzen hoshō jōyaku) was a treaty signed on September 8, 1951 in San Francisco, California, by representatives of the United States and Japan, in conjunction with the Treaty of San Francisco that ended World War II in Asia. The treaty was imposed on Japan by the United States as a condition for ending the occupation of Japan and restoring Japan's sovereignty as a nation. It established a long-lasting military alliance between the United States and Japan.

The agreement contained five articles which dictated that Japan allow the United States to continue maintaining military bases on Japanese soil even after the end of the Occupation. The accord prohibited Japan from providing foreign powers any bases or military-related rights without the consent of the United States. Moreover, the accord allowed the United States to use military forces stationed in Japan without prior consultation with the Japanese government and did not mention any requirement for U.S. forces to defend Japan if Japan were to be attacked. Troublingly for many Japanese, the treaty had no set expiration date, nor did it specify any precise mechanism of abrogation.

The accord was ratified by the U.S. Senate on March 20, 1952 and was signed into U.S. law by U.S. president Harry Truman on April 15, 1952. The treaty went into effect on April 28, 1952, in conjunction with the effectuation of the Treaty of San Francisco that ended the Occupation. At the time, the United States maintained 260,000 troops on Japanese soil, making use of 2,824 facilities throughout the nation (not counting additional soldiers and bases in Okinawa, which remained under direct American control at the time).

In addition to the treaty itself, an "Administrative Agreement" of 29 articles spelling out exact details of the basing agreement was negotiated in secret between the Japanese and United States governments and made public without a vote by either government's legislature on February 28, 1952.

The treaty was highly controversial among the Japanese public, which led to widespread protests throughout the country. As a result, negotiations between leaders Nobusuke Kishi and Dwight D. Eisenhower followed, and the treaty was eventually superseded and replaced by the revised Treaty of Mutual Cooperation and Security between the United States and Japan on June 19, 1960.

== Opposition ==
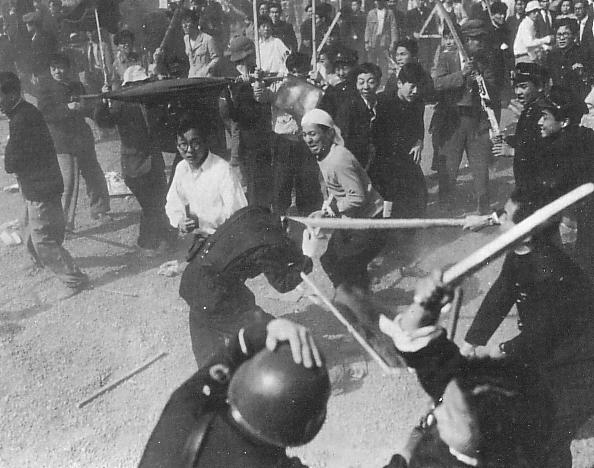
"Bloody May Day": Protesters battle with police in Tokyo on May 1, 1952, in opposition to the continuation of U.S. military bases under the new Security Treaty.

The perceived unequal nature of the treaty provoked vigorous opposition in Japan, most notably, the May 1, 1952 "Bloody May Day" incident. Calls arose from both the left and the right in Japan to revise the humiliating treaty. Although the United States initially resisted pressures to revise the treaty, over the course of the 1950s, a massive anti-base movement arose in Japan, including major incidents such as the Sunagawa Struggle from 1955 to 1957 and the Girard incident in 1957. As a result, the U.S. government was forced into the recognition that U.S. bases in Japan could be rendered unusable by popular opposition, and finally agreed to negotiate a revised treaty in 1957.

== Revision ==
High-level negotiations on a revised version of the treaty began in 1957 and concluded in late 1959. The new Treaty of Mutual Cooperation and Security between the United States and Japan was signed in Washington D.C. by U.S. President Dwight D. Eisenhower and Japanese Prime Minister Nobusuke Kishi on January 19, 1960. From a Japanese perspective, the new treaty was a significant improvement over the original treaty, committing the United States to defend Japan in an attack, requiring prior consultation with the Japanese government before dispatching US forces based in Japan overseas, and specifying an initial 10-year term, after which the treaty could be abrogated by either party with one year's notice. However, many Japanese hoped to chart a more neutral course in the Cold War, and thus hoped to get rid of the treaty and the U.S.-Japan Alliance entirely. This opposition resulted in the massive 1960 Anpo protests, which attempted to block ratification of the new treaty and became the largest protests in Japan's history. Nevertheless, the new treaty was forced through the Diet on May 19, 1960, and automatically took effect on June 19, 1960, replacing the 1951 treaty.

== Text ==
=== Introduction ===
Japan has this day signed a Treaty of Peace with the Allied Powers. On the coming into force of that Treaty, Japan will not have the effective means to exercise its inherent right of self-defense because it has been disarmed.

There is danger to Japan in this situation because irresponsible militarism has not yet been driven from the world. Therefore, Japan desires a Security Treaty with the United States of America to come into force simultaneously with the Treaty of Peace between the United States of America and Japan.

The Treaty of Peace recognizes that Japan as a sovereign nation has the right to enter into collective security arrangements, and further, the Charter of the United Nations recognizes that all nations possess an inherent right of individual and collective self-defense.

In exercise of these rights, Japan desires, as a provisional arrangement for its defense, that the United States of America should maintain armed forces of its own in and about Japan so as to deter armed attack upon Japan.

The United States of America, in the interest of peace and security, is presently willing to maintain certain of its armed forces in and about Japan, in the expectation, however, that Japan will itself increasingly assume responsibility for its own defense against direct and indirect aggression, always avoiding any armament which could be an offensive threat or serve other than to promote peace and security in accordance with the purposes and principles of the United Nations Charter.

Accordingly, the two countries have agreed as follows:

=== Article I ===
Japan grants, and the United States of America accepts, the right, upon the coming into force of the Treaty of Peace and of this Treaty, to dispose United States land, air and sea forces in and about Japan. Such forces may be utilized to contribute to the maintenance of international peace and security in the Far East and to the security of Japan against armed attack from without, including assistance given at the express request of the Japanese Government to put down largescale internal riots and disturbances in Japan, caused through instigation or intervention by an outside power or powers.

=== Article II ===
During the exercise of the right referred to in Article I, Japan will not grant, without the prior consent of the United States of America, any bases or any rights, powers or authority whatsoever, in or relating to bases or the right of garrison or of maneuver, or transit of ground, air or naval forces to any third power.

=== Article III ===
The conditions which shall govern the disposition of armed forces of the United States of America in and about Japan shall be determined by administrative agreements between the two Governments.

=== Article IV ===
This Treaty shall expire whenever in the opinion of the Governments of the United States of America and Japan there shall have come into force such United Nations arrangements or such alternative individual or collective security dispositions as will satisfactorily provide for the maintenance by the United Nations or otherwise of international peace and security in the Japan Area.

=== Article V ===
This Treaty shall be ratified by the United States of America and Japan and will come into force when instruments of ratification thereof have been exchanged by them at Washington.

=== Signatories ===
IN WITNESS WHEREOF the undersigned Plenipotentiaries have signed this Treaty.

DONE in duplicate at the city of San Francisco, in the English and Japanese languages, this eighth day of September, 1951.

FOR THE UNITED STATES OF AMERICA:

Dean Acheson
John Foster Dulles
Alexander Wiley
Styles Bridges

FOR JAPAN:

Shigeru Yoshida

== See also ==
- Treaty of Mutual Cooperation and Security between the United States and Japan (1960)
  The revised U.S.–Japan Alliance treaty, 1960 to present.
- Occupation of Japan
  Japan under Allied occupation, from 1945 until 1952.
