= Occupation of Japan =

Post-World War II occupation of Japan

- 1945–1952
- Left: Civil and naval ensign Right: State flag (de facto)

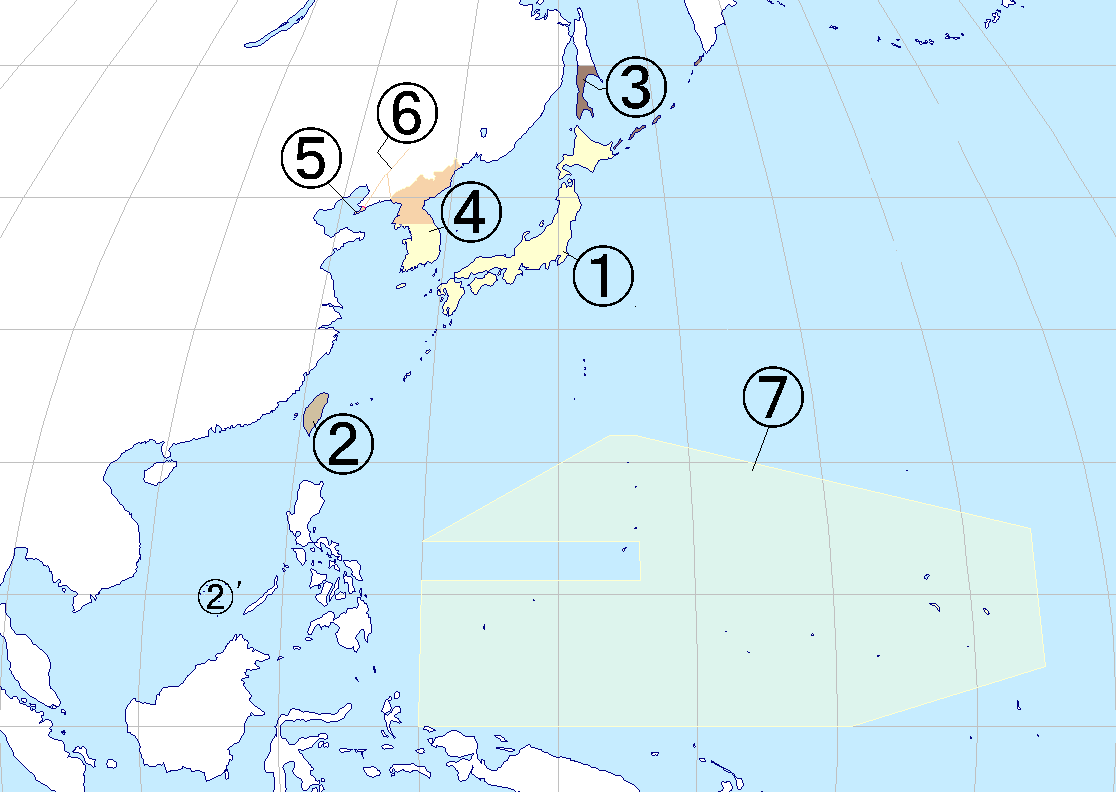
- De jure map of Japan under Allied occupation.: 1. The Japanese archipelago, placed under the authority of the Supreme Commander for the Allied Powers (de facto United States), effective 1945–1952. (Note: A portion of Japanese territory was put under United States administration after 1952 in accordance with Article 3 of San Francisco Peace Treaty: those being the Amami Islands (until 1953), the Nanpō Islands south of Lot's Wife (until 1968) and Okinawa Prefecture (until 1972); such arrangement was treaty based, and not part of the Allied occupation.); 2. Japanese Taiwan and its Spratly Islands, placed under the authority of the Republic of China.; 3. Karafuto Prefecture and the Kuril Islands, placed under the authority of the Soviet Union.; 4. Japanese Korea south of the 38th parallel north, placed under the authority of the United States Army Military Government in Korea, granted independence in 1948 as the Republic of Korea (South Korea).; 5. The Kwantung Leased Territory, a Japanese colony occupied by the Soviet Union 1945–1955, returned to the People's Republic of China in 1955.; 6. Japanese Korea north of the 38th parallel north, placed under the authority of the Soviet Civil Administration, granted independence in 1948 as the Democratic People's Republic of Korea (North Korea); 7. The South Seas Mandate, a Japanese colony in the name of the League of Nations, occupied by the United States 1945–1947, converted into the Trust Territory of the Pacific Islands of the United Nations under the US administration in 1947.
- Status: Military occupation
- History
  - Emperor Hirohito announces surrender of Japan: 15 August 1945
  - Occupation begins: 28 August 1945
  - Official surrender ceremony in Tokyo Bay: 2 September 1945
  - Transfer of the administration of Taiwan and Pescadores to the Republic of China: 25 October 1945
  - Constitutional amendment: 3 May 1947
  - North Korea: 10 July 1948
  - South Korea: 15 August 1948
  - Treaty of San Francisco: 28 April 1952
Preceded by	Succeeded by
Empire of Japan	Japan

Japan was occupied and administered by the Allies of World War II from the surrender of the Empire of Japan on September 2, 1945, at the war's end until the Treaty of San Francisco took effect on April 28, 1952. The occupation, led by the American military with support from the British Commonwealth and under the supervision of the Far Eastern Commission, involved a total of nearly one million Allied soldiers. The occupation was overseen by the US general Douglas MacArthur, who was appointed Supreme Commander for the Allied Powers (SCAP) by the US president Harry S. Truman; MacArthur was succeeded as supreme commander by General Matthew Ridgway in 1951. Unlike in the occupations of Germany and Austria, the Soviet Union had little to no influence in Japan, declining to participate because it did not want to place Soviet troops under MacArthur's direct command.

This foreign presence marks the only time in the history of Japan that it has been occupied by a foreign power. However, unlike in Germany, the Allies never assumed direct control over Japan's civil administration. In the immediate aftermath of Japan's military surrender, the country's government continued to formally operate under the provisions of the Meiji Constitution.

Furthermore, at General MacArthur's insistence, Emperor Hirohito remained on the imperial throne and was effectively granted full immunity from prosecution for war crimes after he agreed to replace the wartime cabinet with a ministry acceptable to the Allies and committed to implementing the terms of the Potsdam Declaration, which among other things called for the country to become a parliamentary democracy. Under MacArthur's guidance, the Japanese government introduced sweeping social reforms and implemented economic reforms that recalled American "New Deal" priorities of the 1930s under President Franklin D. Roosevelt. In 1947, a sweeping amendment to the Meiji Constitution was passed that effectively repealed it in its entirety and replaced it with a new constitution, and the Emperor's theoretically vast powers, which for many centuries had been constrained only by conventions that had evolved over time, became strictly limited by law as a constitutional monarchy.

While Article 9 of the constitution explicitly forbade Japan from maintaining a military or pursuing war as a means to settle international disputes, this policy soon became problematic especially as neighboring China fell under the control of the Chinese Communist Party and the Korean War broke out. As a result, the National Police Reserve (NPR) was founded in 1950. The NPR was reorganized into the Japan Self-Defense Forces (JSDF) in 1954, effectively completing the de facto remilitarization of Japan.

The occupation officially ended with the coming into force of the Treaty of San Francisco, signed on September 8, 1951 and effective from April 28, 1952, after which the US military ceased any direct involvement in the country's civil administration; this effectively restored full sovereignty to Japan, with the exception of the Ryukyu Islands (Okinawa Prefecture). The simultaneous implementation of the US-Japan Security Treaty (replaced by the revised treaty in 1960) allowed tens of thousands of American soldiers to remain based in Japan indefinitely, albeit at the invitation of the Japanese government and not as an occupation force.

The occupation of Japan can be usefully divided into three phases: the initial effort to punish and reform Japan; the so-called "Reverse Course" in which the focus shifted to suppressing dissent and reviving the Japanese economy to support the US in the Cold War as a country of the Western Bloc; and the final establishment of a formal peace treaty with the 48 Allies of the Second World War and an enduring military alliance with the United States.

== Background ==
=== Initial planning ===
American planning for a post-war occupation of Japan began as early as February 1942, when President Franklin D. Roosevelt established an Advisory Committee on Postwar Foreign Policy to advise him on the postwar reconstruction of Germany, Italy, and Japan (Axis powers). On matters related to Japan, this committee was later succeeded by the smaller Inter-Departmental Area Committee on the Far East (IDAFE), which met 234 times between the autumn of 1942 and the summer of 1945 and had frequent discussions with two US presidents, Roosevelt and Harry S. Truman.

During the war, the Allied Powers had planned to divide Japan amongst themselves for the purposes of occupation, as was done for the Allied-occupied Germany. Under the final plan, however, Supreme Commander for the Allied Powers (SCAP) was to be given direct control over the main islands of Japan (Honshu, Hokkaido, Shikoku, and Kyushu) and the immediately surrounding islands, while outlying possessions were divided between the Allied Powers as follows:

- Soviet Union: Northern Korea, South Sakhalin, and the Kuril Islands
- United States: Southern Korea, Okinawa Islands, the Amami Islands, the Ogasawara Islands and Japanese possessions in Micronesia
- China: Taiwan and Penghu

In early August 1945, with Japan's surrender seeming probable, the US Joint Chiefs of Staff recommended to President Harry S. Truman that Pacific Theatre Commander General Douglas MacArthur be named Supreme Commander for the Allied Powers to oversee the surrender and occupation of Japan. Truman agreed, and MacArthur asked his staff in Manila to begin making concrete preparations for the occupation of Japan.

As the Soviets moved in to occupy their allotted territories, some Japanese forces continued to resist even after the Japanese surrender. Such operations included final battles on the Kuril Islands and South Sakhalin well past the end of August in 1945. In the end, despite its initial hopes, the Soviet Union did not manage to occupy any part of the Japanese home islands, largely due to significant U.S. opposition that was backed by the leverage gained by its then newly realized status as the world's only nuclear-armed state.

In any case, Soviet leader Joseph Stalin was not inclined to press the Americans very far following Japan's surrender. He was not willing to place Soviet troops under MacArthur's direct command. Furthermore, in terms of both strategic interests and prestige the Soviets had achieved most of their war aims in the Far East. Moreover, whereas China, Korea and Japan were all a considerable distance from the USSR's European heartland, Stalin regarded establishing a powerful buffer against further military threats from the west to be vital to the Soviet Union's future existence. He therefore placed a far greater priority on establishing Soviet communist influence in Europe rather than in Asia.

=== Japanese surrender and initial landings ===
Following the dropping of atomic bombs and the entry of the Soviet Union into the war against Japan, on the night of 9–10 August 1945, Emperor Hirohito announced his decision that the Japanese government should accept the terms demanded by the Allies in the Potsdam Declaration to Prime Minister Kantarō Suzuki and his administration. On August 15, 1945, Emperor Hirohito announced Japan's surrender to the Japanese people in a nationwide radio broadcast. Two days after Japanese Emperor's first radio broadcast informing the surrender of Japan, Prince Naruhiko Higashikuni (a member of Japanese imperial family and father-in-law of Hirohito's eldest daughter, Shigeko Higashikuni) became first post-war Prime Minister on August 17, 1945.

Army personnel-produced Technicolor film of MacArthur's arrival in allied-occupied Tokyo and flag-raising ceremony, September 1945.

Japanese officials left for Manila on August 19 to meet MacArthur and to discuss surrender terms. On August 28, 1945, a week before the official surrender ceremony, 150 US personnel flew to Atsugi, Kanagawa Prefecture. They were followed by the USS Missouri, whose accompanying vessels landed the 4th Marine Regiment on the southern coast of Kanagawa. The 11th Airborne Division was airlifted from Okinawa to Atsugi Airdrome, 50 kilometres (30 mi) from Tokyo. Other Allied personnel followed.

MacArthur arrived in Tokyo on August 30 and immediately decreed several laws. No Allied personnel were to assault Japanese people or eat the scarce Japanese food. Flying the Hinomaru (sun disc), national flag of Japan was initially severely restricted (although individuals and prefectural offices could apply for permission to fly it); this restriction was partially lifted in 1948 and completely lifted the following year.

On September 2, 1945, Japan formally surrendered with the signing of the Japanese Instrument of Surrender. On September 6, U.S. President Truman approved a document titled "U.S. Initial Post-Surrender Policy for Japan". The document set two main objectives for the occupation: eliminating Japan's war potential and turning Japan into a democratic nation with pro-United Nations orientation.

=== Size and scope ===
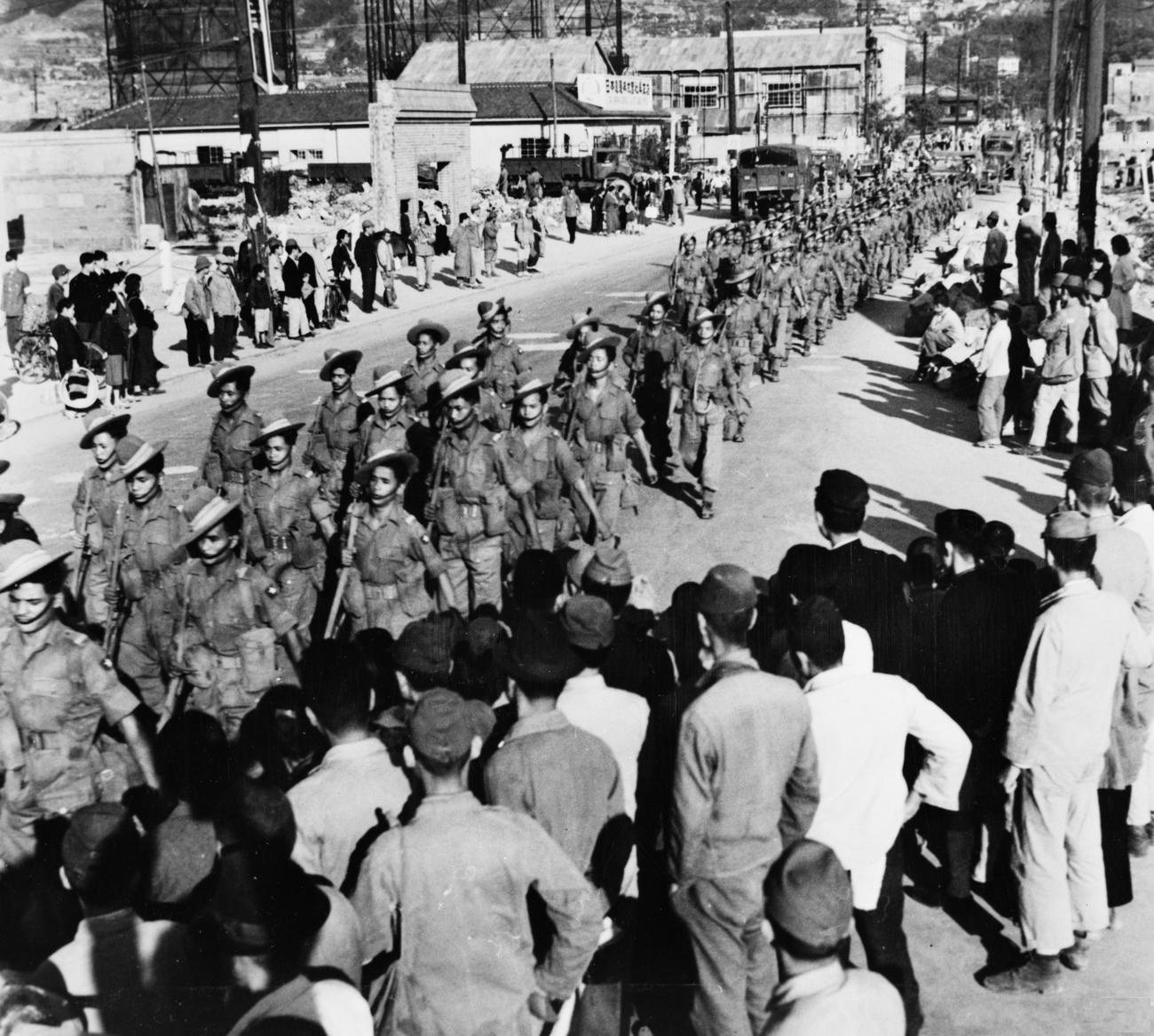
May 1946: The Indian Army 2nd Battalion 5th Royal Gurkha Rifles march through Kure, Hiroshima soon after their arrival in Japan.

By the end of 1945, around 430,000 American soldiers were stationed throughout Japan. Of the main Japanese islands, Kyushu was occupied by the 24th Infantry Division, with some responsibility for Shikoku. Honshu was occupied by the First Cavalry Division and Sixth Army. Hokkaido was occupied by the 77th Infantry and 11th Airborne Divisions. By the beginning of 1946, replacement troops began to arrive in the country in large numbers and were assigned to MacArthur's Eighth Army, headquartered in Tokyo's Dai-Ichi building. The US occupation forces also included air and naval contingents. In total, including rotations of replacement troops throughout the seven years, nearly 1 million American soldiers would serve in the occupation, in addition to thousands of civilian contractors and tens of thousands of dependents.

The American forces were supplemented by around 40,000 troops from the British Commonwealth. The official British Commonwealth Occupation Force (BCOF), composed of Australian, British, Indian and New Zealand personnel, did not begin deployment to Japan until February 21, 1946. While U.S. forces were responsible for the overall occupation, BCOF was responsible for supervising demilitarization and the disposal of Japan's war industries. BCOF was also responsible for occupation of several western prefectures and had its headquarters at Kure. At its peak, the force numbered about 40,000 personnel, which amounted to a quarter of the occupation forces. The primary ground units involved were the 34th Australian Infantry Brigade, 9th New Zealand Infantry Brigade, 5th British Infantry Brigade (later redesignated as the 25th Independent Infantry Brigade), and the 268th Indian Infantry Brigade. The air component, known as British Commonwealth Air Forces (BCAIR), consisted of squadrons from all participants. The naval component was provided primarily by the British Pacific Fleet, together with contingents of Commonwealth ships. During 1947, BCOF began to decrease its activities in Japan. By 1948, it was staffed solely by Australian personnel. It was effectively wound up in 1951 as control of Commonwealth forces in Japan was transferred to British Commonwealth Forces Korea.

China was originally an intended participant in the occupation. The National Revolutionary Army under Chiang Kai-shek was allotted Aichi Prefecture as its initial zone of responsibility, with the possibility of the Chinese occupation zone being altered by SCAP as needed. The National Revolutionary Army's 67th Division was selected as the unit to be deployed to Japan. The planned Chinese occupation ultimately never materialized.

The Far Eastern Commission and Allied Council for Japan were also established to supervise the occupation of Japan. The establishment of a multilateral Allied council for Japan was proposed by the Soviet government as early as September 1945, and was supported partially by the British, French and Chinese governments.

== Initial phase ==
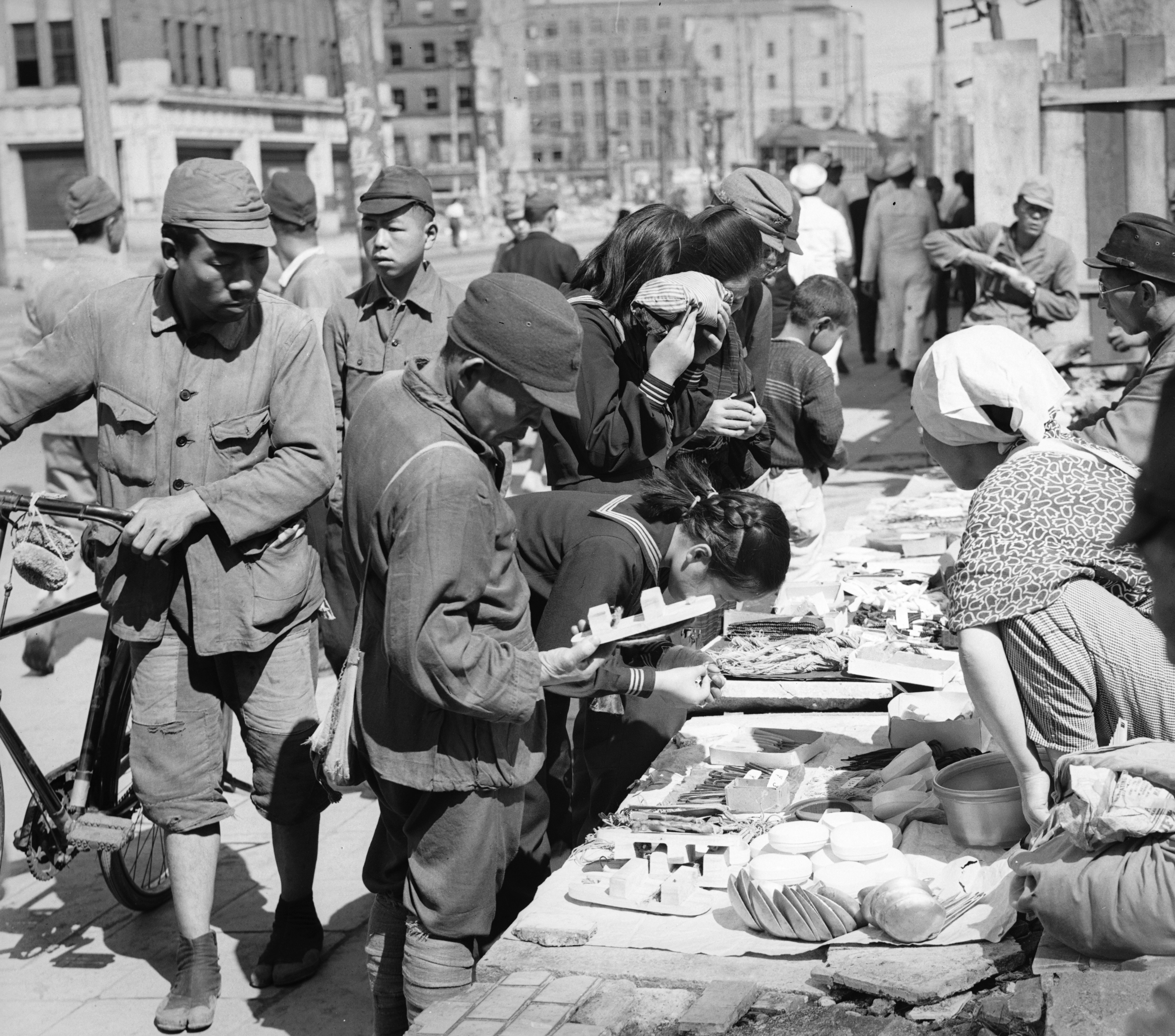
Street Stall, Tokyo, 21 November 1945

The initial phase of the Occupation focused on punishing Japan for having made war on the Allies, and undertook a thorough reformation of Japanese society to ensure that Japan would never again be a threat to world peace. Reforms targeted all major sectors of Japanese society, government, and economy. Historians have emphasized similarities to the American New Deal programs of the 1930s. Moore and Robinson note that, "New Deal liberalism seemed natural, even to conservative Republicans such as MacArthur and Whitney."

=== Feeding the starving populace ===
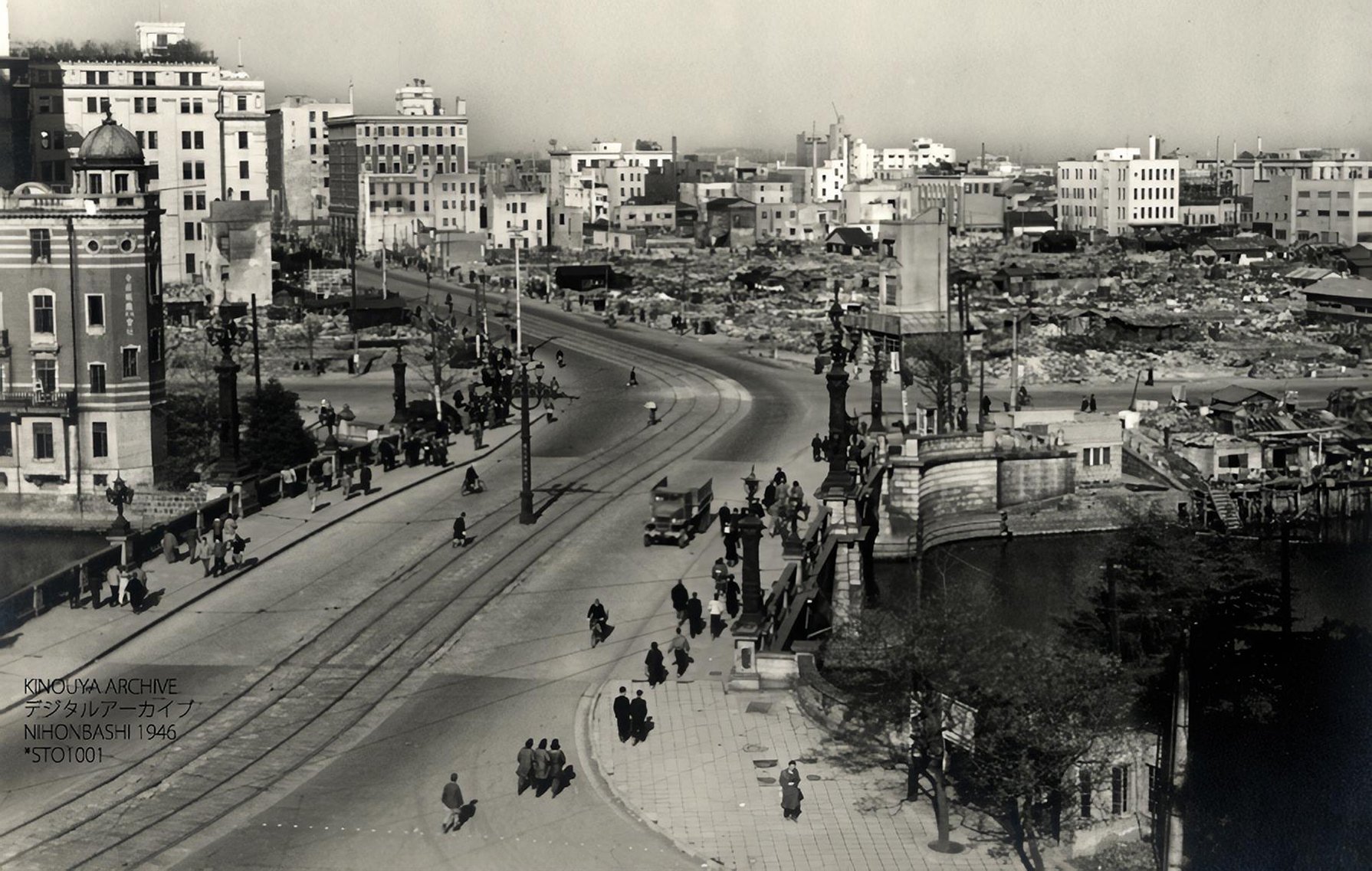
Nihonbashi, Tokyo, in 1946

Half-destroyed Tokyo as filmed by Gaetano Faillace

Before reforms could be undertaken, MacArthur's first priority was to set up a food distribution network. Following the collapse of the ruling government and the wholesale destruction of most major cities, virtually the entire Japanese populace was starving. The air raids on Japan's urban centers left millions displaced, and food shortages (created by bad harvests and the demands of the war) worsened when the seizure of foodstuffs from Korea, Taiwan, and China ceased. Repatriation of Japanese people living in other parts of Asia and hundreds of thousands of demobilized prisoners of war only aggravated the hunger problem in Japan, as these people put more strain on already scarce resources. Around 5.1 million Japanese returned to Japan in the fifteen months following October 1, 1945, and another million returned in 1947. As expressed by Kazuo Kawai, "Democracy cannot be taught to a starving people". Initially, the U.S. government provided emergency food relief through Government Aid and Relief in Occupied Areas (GARIOA) funds. In fiscal year 1946, this aid amounted to US$92 million in loans. From April 1946, under the guise of Licensed Agencies for Relief in Asia, private relief organizations were also permitted to provide relief. Even with these measures, millions of people were still on the brink of starvation for several years after the surrender.

=== Preserving the Emperor ===
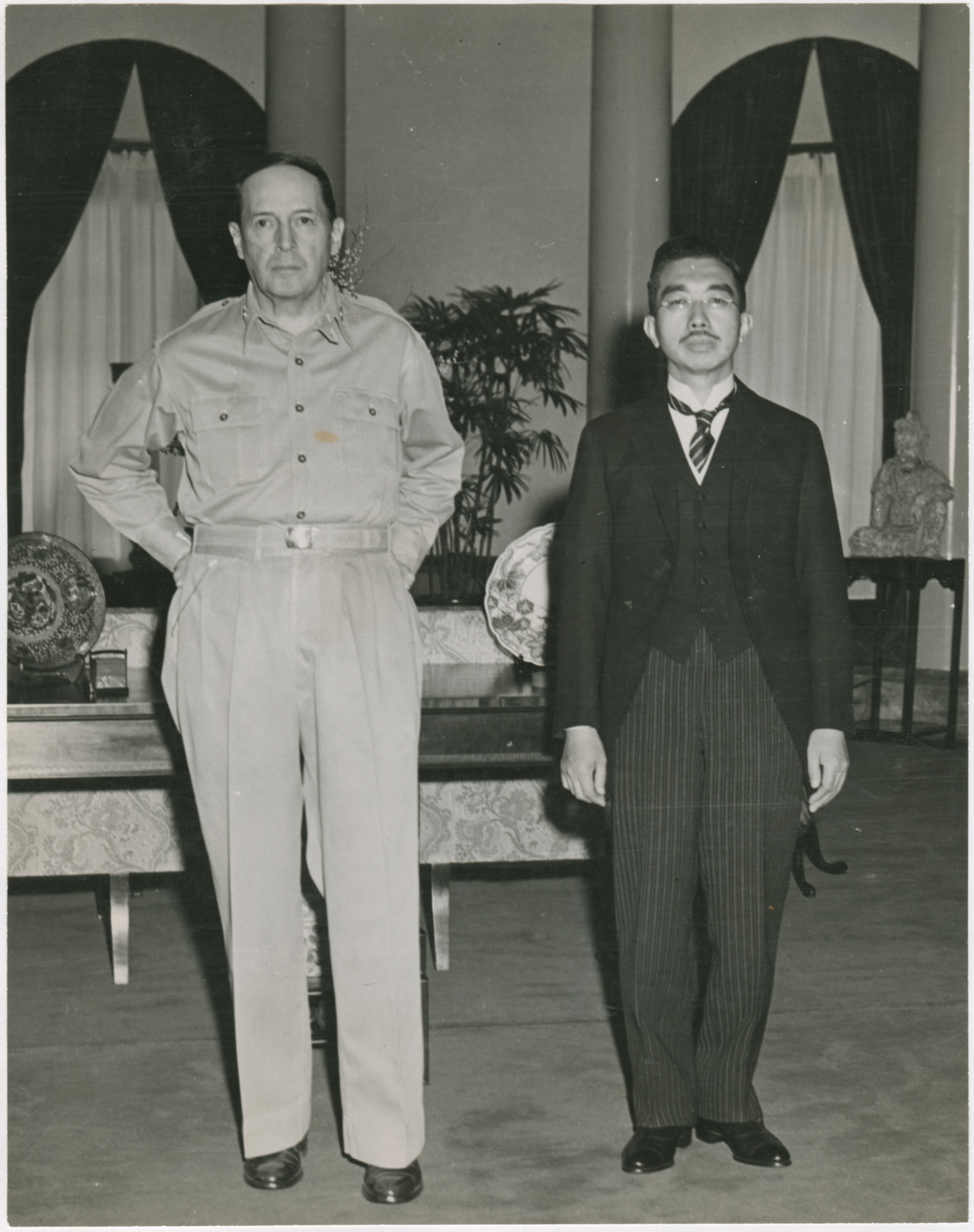
Gaetano Faillace's famous photo of Douglas MacArthur and Emperor Hirohito

Once the food network was in place, MacArthur set out to win the support of Hirohito. The two men met for the first time on September 27, 1945; the photograph of the two together is one of the most famous in Japanese history. Some were shocked that MacArthur wore his standard duty uniform with no tie, instead of his dress uniform, when meeting the Emperor Hirohito. The difference in height between the towering MacArthur and the diminutive Hirohito also impressed upon Japanese citizens who was in charge now. With the cooperation of Japan's reigning monarch, MacArthur had the political ammunition he needed to begin the real work of the occupation. While other Allied political and military leaders pushed for Hirohito to be tried as a war criminal, MacArthur resisted such calls, arguing that any such prosecution would be overwhelmingly unpopular with the Japanese people. He also rejected calls for abdication, promoted by some members of the imperial family such as Takahito, Prince Mikasa (younger brother of Hirohito) and former prime minister Prince Naruhiko Higashikuni (father-in-law of Hirohito's eldest daughter, Princess Shigeko) and demands of intellectuals like Tatsuji Miyoshi.

=== Disarmament and demobilization ===
1946 newsreel

Japanese soldiers were rapidly disarmed and demobilized en masse. On September 15, 1945, the Japanese Imperial Headquarters was dissolved. By December, all Japanese military forces in the Japanese home islands were fully disbanded. Occupation forces also exploded or dumped into the sea over 2 million tons of unused munitions and other war materiel.

=== Release of political prisoners ===
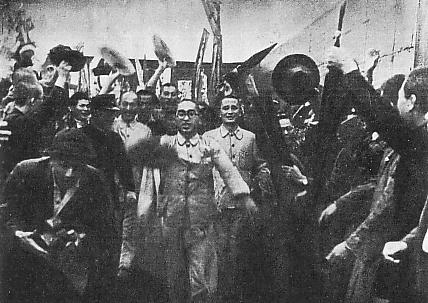
The Japanese government releases members of the Japanese Communist Party on October 10, 1945.

The issuing of the Removal of Restrictions on Political, Civil, and Religious Liberties directive by SCAP on October 4, 1945, led to the abolition of the Peace Preservation Law and the release of all political prisoners. Japanese communists were released from jail, and the Japan Communist Party was granted legal status.

=== Disestablishment of State Shinto ===
On December 15, 1945, the Shinto Directive was issued, abolishing Shinto as a state religion and prohibiting some of its teachings and rites that were deemed to be militaristic or ultra-nationalistic.

=== Trade Union Act ===
On December 22, 1945, at SCAP's direction, the Diet passed Japan's first ever trade union law protecting the rights of workers to form or join a union, to organize, and take industrial action. There had been pre-war attempts to do so, but none that were successfully passed until the Allied occupation. A new Trade Union Law was passed on June 1, 1949, which remains in place to the present day. According to Article 1 of the Act, the purpose of the act is to "elevate the status of workers by promoting their being on equal standing with the employer".

=== Purge of wartime public officials ===
In January 1946, SCAP issued directives calling for the purge of wartime officials from public offices. Individuals targeted in the purge included accused war criminals, military officers, leaders of ultranationalist societies, leaders in the Imperial Rule Assistance Association, business leaders involved in Japanese overseas economic expansion, governors of former Japanese colonies, and national leaders involved in the decisions leading Japan into war. Ultimately, SCAP screened a total of 717,415 possible purgees, and wound up excluding 201,815 of them from holding public office. However, as part of the "Reverse Course" in Occupation policy, most of the purgees would be de-purged and allowed to return to public life by 1951.

=== Enfranchisement of women ===
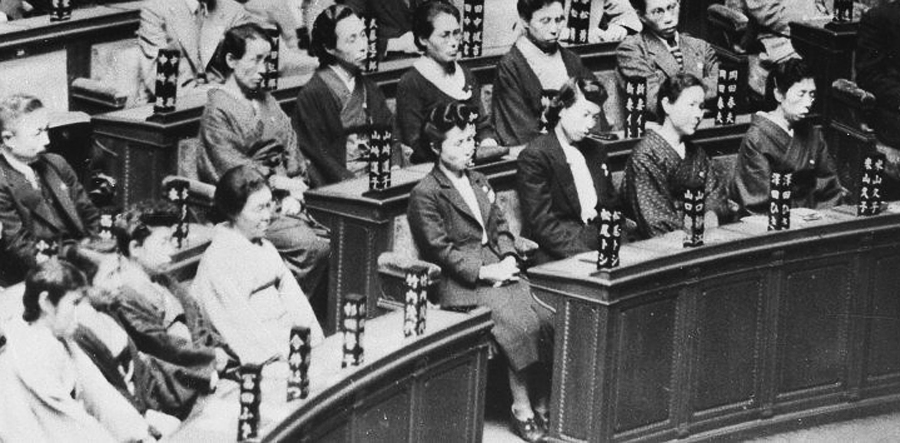
The first women in the Japanese Diet, 1946

After Japan's surrender, women's leaders in Japan began calling for women's enfranchisement. In August 1945, Ichikawa Fusae (a leader of the pre-war women's suffrage movement) organized the Women's Committee to Cope with Postwar Conditions, a group of 70 Japanese women whose top priorities included women's enfranchisement. Swayed by the urges of female leaders, Home Minister Horiuchi Zenjiro advocated for granting women enfranchisement in a meeting of the Japanese male leaders of the Shidehara Cabinet on October 9, 1945. Convinced, the cabinet voted unanimously to grant women the right to vote. Two days later, before any action was taken to enact the cabinet's decision, General MacArthur issued his five-point reform directive, one of the points being an order to liberate Japanese women through enfranchisement. After MacArthur issued his directive, the Japanese government officially lowered the voting age and extended the voting franchise to women in future elections. On April 10, 1946, first post-war Japanese general election with 78.52% voter turnout among men and 66.97% among women was held, giving Japan its first prime minister partially elected by men and women, Shigeru Yoshida succeeded Kijūrō Shidehara as prime minister, took office on May 22, 1946.

=== Hirohito renounces his divinity ===
At SCAP's insistence, as part of a New Year's Day message, Emperor Hirohito publicly renounced his own divinity, declaring:

The ties between Us and Our people have always stood upon mutual trust and affection. They do not depend upon mere legends and myths. They are not predicated on the false conception that the Emperor is divine, and that the Japanese people are superior to other races and fated to rule the world.

=== Constitutional amendment ===
In 1947, the Diet ratified a new Constitution of Japan through amendment of Meiji Constitution that followed closely a "model copy" drafted by American civilian officials within SCAP, and was promulgated to replace the old Prussian-style Meiji Constitution that had granted the Emperor theoretically unlimited powers. The new constitution drew inspiration from the U.S. Bill of Rights, New Deal social legislation, the liberal constitutions of several European states and even the Soviet Union, and transferred sovereignty from the Emperor to the people in an attempt to depoliticize the Throne and reduce it to the status of a state symbol. Included in the revised charter was the famous Article Nine, whereby Japan forever renounced war as an instrument of state policy and became forbidden to maintain a standing army. The 1947 Constitution also officially enfranchised women, guaranteed fundamental human rights, strengthened the powers of Parliament and the Cabinet, and decentralized the police and local government.

=== Zaibatsu dissolution ===
To further remove Japan as a potential future threat to the United States, the Far Eastern Commission decided that Japan was to be partly de-industrialized. In the end, SCAP adopted a program of de-industrialization and de-concentration in Japan that was implemented to a lesser degree than the similar U.S. "industrial disarmament" program in Germany. To this end, the prewar zaibatsu industrial conglomerates were pressured into undergoing "voluntary" dissolution into smaller independent companies. Although SCAP originally planned to break up 325 Japanese companies, as a result of changes in priorities in connection with the "Reverse Course," in the end only the 11 largest companies were dissolved.

=== Labor Standards Act ===
The Labor Standards Act was enacted on April 7, 1947, to govern working conditions in Japan. According to Article 1 of the Act, its goal was to ensure that "Working conditions shall be those which should meet the needs of workers who live lives worthy of human beings." Support stemming from the Allied occupation has introduced better working conditions and pay for numerous employees in Japanese business. This allowed for more sanitary and hygienic working environments along with welfare and government assistance for health insurance, pensions plans and work involving other trained specialists. While it was created while Japan was under occupation, the origins of the Act have nothing to do with the occupation forces. It appears to have been the brainchild of Kosaku Teramoto, a former member of the Thought Police, who had become the head of the Labor Standards section of the Welfare Ministry.

=== Education reform ===
Before and during the war, Japanese education was based on the German system, with "Gymnasien" (selective grammar schools) and universities to train students after primary school. During the occupation, Japan's secondary education system was changed to incorporate three-year junior high schools and senior high schools similar to those in the United States: Junior high school became compulsory, but senior high school remained optional. The Imperial Rescript on Education was repealed, and the Imperial University system reorganized. The longstanding issue of Japanese script reform, which had been planned for decades but continuously opposed by more conservative elements, was also resolved during this time. The Japanese writing system was drastically reorganized with the Tōyō kanji-list in 1946, predecessor of today's Jōyō kanji, and orthography was greatly altered to reflect spoken usage.

=== Land reform ===
A sweeping land reform was also conducted, led by Wolf Ladejinsky from SCAP. However, Ladejinsky would claim that the real architect of the reform was Hiroo Wada, former Japanese Minister of Agriculture and Forestry. Between 1947 and 1949, approximately 5,800,000 acres (23,000 km^{2}) of land (approximately 38% of Japan's cultivated land) were purchased from the landlords under the government's reform program and resold at extremely low prices (after inflation) to the farmers who worked them. MacArthur's land reform redistribution resulted in only 10% of the land being worked by non-owners. By 1950, three million peasants had acquired land, dismantling a power structure that the landlords had long dominated.

=== Punishing war criminals ===
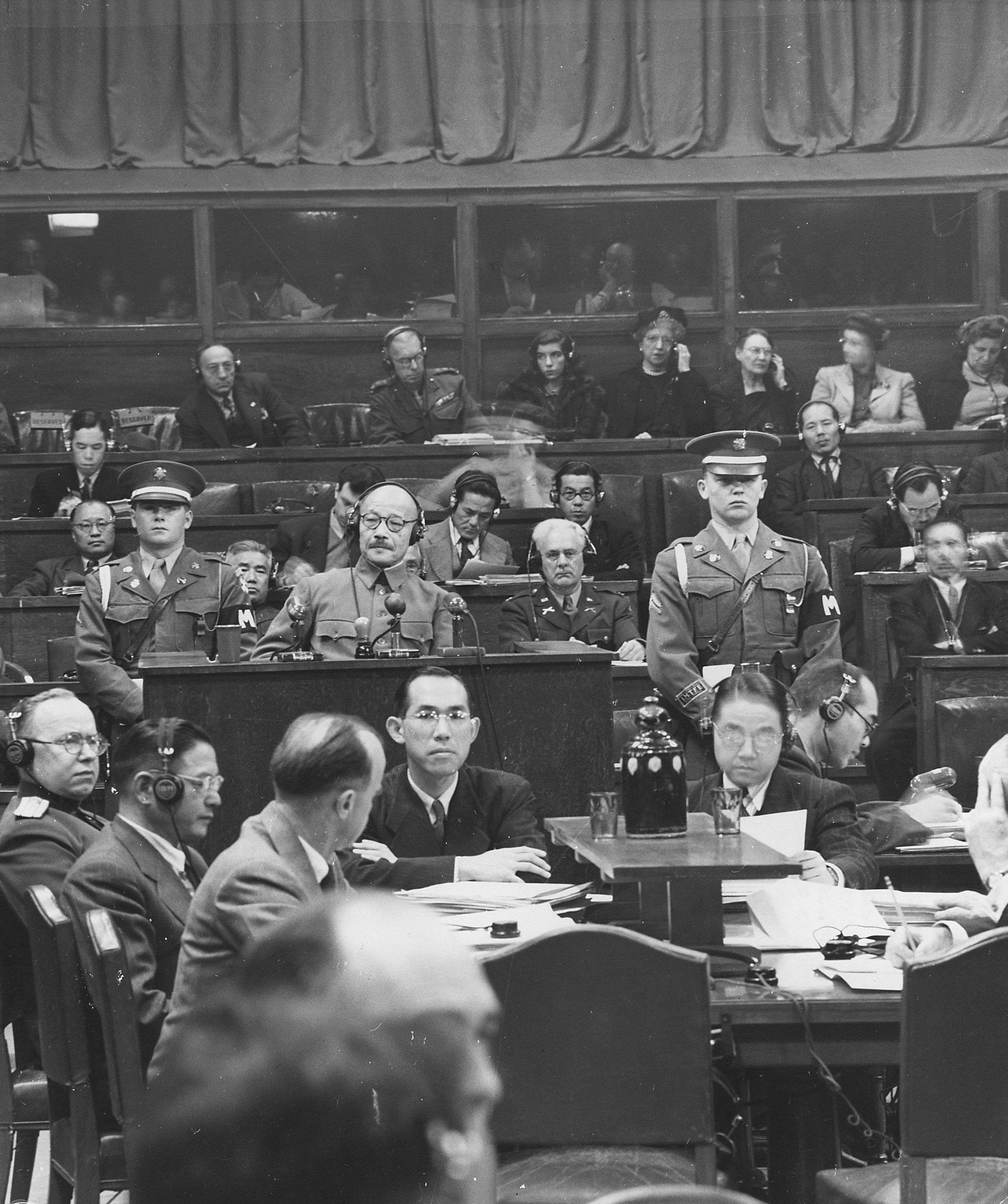
Hideki Tōjō (Prime Minister of Japan, took office from 1941 to 1944) takes the stand at the Tokyo war crimes tribunal.

While these other reforms were taking place, various military tribunals, most notably the International Military Tribunal for the Far East in Ichigaya, were trying Japan's war criminals and sentencing many to death and imprisonment. However, many suspects such as Masanobu Tsuji, Nobusuke Kishi, Yoshio Kodama and Ryōichi Sasakawa were never judged, while the Emperor Hirohito, all members of the imperial family implicated in the war such as Yasuhito, Prince Chichibu (younger brother of Hirohito), Prince Yasuhiko Asaka, Prince Fushimi Hiroyasu, former prime minister Prince Naruhiko Higashikuni (father-in-law of Princess Shigeko, Hirohito's eldest daughter) and Prince Tsuneyoshi Takeda, and all members of Unit 731—including its director Dr. Shirō Ishii—were granted immunity from criminal prosecution by General MacArthur.

Before the war crimes trials actually convened, the SCAP, its International Prosecution Section (IPS) and Shōwa officials worked behind the scenes not only to prevent the imperial family from being indicted, but also to slant the testimony of the defendants to ensure that no one implicated the Emperor. High officials in court circles and the Shōwa government collaborated with Allied GHQ in compiling lists of prospective war criminals, while the individuals arrested as Class A suspects and incarcerated in Sugamo prison solemnly vowed to protect their sovereign against any possible taint of war responsibility. Thus, months before the Tokyo tribunal commenced, MacArthur's highest subordinates were working to attribute ultimate responsibility for attack on Pearl Harbor to former prime minister Hideki Tojo by allowing "the major criminal suspects to coordinate their stories so that the Emperor would be spared from indictment." According to historian John W. Dower, "With the full support of MacArthur's headquarters, the prosecution functioned, in effect, as a defense team for the emperor."

In Dower's view,

Even Japanese peace activists who endorse the ideals of the Nuremberg and Tokyo charters, and who have labored to document and publicize Japanese atrocities, cannot defend the American decision to exonerate the emperor of war responsibility and then, in the chill of Cold War, release and soon afterwards openly embrace accused right-wing war criminals like the later prime minister Kishi Nobusuke.

== The "Reverse Course" ==
The Reverse Course (逆コース, gyaku kōsu) is the name commonly given to a major shift in the Occupation policies that began in 1947 in response to the emerging global Cold War. In particular, U.S. priorities shifted from punishing and reforming Japan to ensuring internal political stability, rebuilding the shattered economy, and remilitarizing Japan to the extent possible under Article 9, in support of U.S. Cold War objectives in East Asia. This involved relaxing and in some cases even partially undoing earlier reforms the Occupation had enacted in 1945 and 1946. As a U.S. Department of State official history puts it, "this 'Reverse Course'...focused on strengthening, not punishing, what would become a key Cold War ally."

An early sign of the shift in SCAP's thinking came in January 1947 when MacArthur announced that he would not permit a massive, nationwide general strike that labor unions had scheduled for February 1. Thereafter, the broader shift in Occupation policies became more and more apparent. Thousands of conservative and nationalist wartime leaders were de-purged and allowed to reenter politics and government ministries. In the industrial sector, plans for further anti-trust actions against the remains of the old zaibatsu industrial conglomerates were scrapped, and some earlier anti-trust policies were partially undone. The incomplete suppression of the zaibatsu allowed them to partially reform as "informal associations" known as keiretsu. SCAP also attempted to weaken the labor unions they had recently empowered, most notably issuing an edict stripping public-sector workers of their right to go on strike.

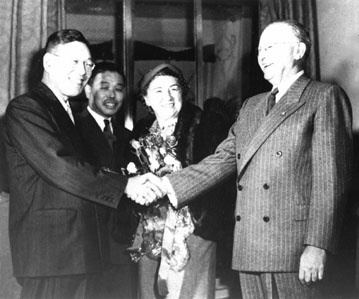
Joseph Dodge meets Finance Minister Hayato Ikeda in 1949.

In order to stabilize the Japanese economy as soon as possible, American banker Joseph Dodge was brought in as an economic consultant. Dodge implemented the "Dodge Line" in 1949, a set of draconian contractionary fiscal and monetary policies that caused much hardship for the Japanese populace but succeeded in getting rampant inflation under control. Dodge also fixed the exchange rate at 360 yen to the dollar, a favorable rate that would help boost Japanese exports in the years to come and power the Japanese economic miracle.

As part of the Reverse Course, the United States also began pressuring Japan to remilitarize. In 1950, SCAP established the National Police Reserve (NPR), which would later become the basis of the present-day Japan Self Defense Forces (JSDF), founded in 1954.

The climax of the Reverse course came in the so-called "Red Purge" (reddo pāji) of 1950. The "fall" of China to the communists in 1949 and the outbreak of the Korean War in 1950 had heightened conservative fears that communism was on the march in East Asia. Against this backdrop, the Japanese government and business leaders, with the connivance and encouragement of SCAP, purged tens of thousands of communists, alleged communists, and other leftists from government posts, private sector jobs, and teaching positions at schools and universities.

The Reverse Course significantly weakened left-wing forces and strengthened conservatives, laying the foundations for decades of conservative rule. At the same time, it did not completely destroy leftist forces that had been deliberately unleashed in the Occupation's early stages, setting the stage for extremely contentious political struggles and labor strife in the 1950s, culminating in the massive Anpo protests and Miike Coal Mine Strike, both in 1960.

== Ending the occupation ==
Prime Minister Shigeru Yoshida signs the Treaty of San Francisco, which brought an end to the Allied Occupation of Japan.

In 1949, MacArthur made a sweeping change in the SCAP power structure that greatly increased the power of Japan's native rulers, and the occupation began to draw to a close. The Treaty of San Francisco, which was to end the occupation, was signed on September 8, 1951. It came into effect on April 28, 1952, formally ending all occupation powers of the Allied forces and restoring full sovereignty to Japan, except for the island chains of Iwo Jima and Okinawa, which the United States continued to hold. The General Headquarters of SCAP was abolished on the same day, though the American military administration remained in Tokyo until July 1, 1957 when the Far East Command was officially dissolved. Iwo Jima was returned to Japan in 1968, and most of Okinawa was returned in 1972.

As a condition of securing the end of the Occupation and the restoration of Japanese sovereignty, Japan was compelled by the United States to agree to the U.S.-Japan Security Treaty, which has allowed US troops to remain based on Japanese soil on an indefinite basis. Even after the Occupation officially ended in 1952, a total of 260,000 American soldiers remained based on mainland Japan (exclusive of U.S.-controlled Okinawa, which based tens of thousands more). Even today, some 31,000 US military personnel remain based in Japan, including at major bases near Tokyo, Hiroshima, Nagasaki, Aomori, Sapporo, and Ishikari.

Popular anger at the continuing presence of these U.S. military bases in Japan even after the official end of the Occupation continued to grow over the course of the 1950s, leading to a nationwide anti-base movement and a number of spectacular protests, including Bloody May Day in 1952, the Sunagawa Struggle from 1955 to 1957, and the Girard Incident protests in 1957. Partially in response to these protests, the original 1951 Security Treaty was revised into a somewhat less one-sided pact in 1960, resulting in the current U.S.-Japan Security Treaty, which has had the effect of establishing a military alliance between the United States and Japan. However, even the revised treaty was opposed by many in Japan, leading to the massive 1960 Anpo protests, which were the largest protests in Japan's modern history.

Since the end of the Occupation, the United States has continuously pressured Japan to revise its American-imposed constitution to remove Article 9 and fully remilitarize. As a result, in 1954 the National Police Reserve was reorganized into the Japan Self-Defense Forces, a de facto military force, with U.S. assistance. However, thus far Japan has resisted U.S. pressures to fully rearm and remilitarize. Under the Yoshida Doctrine, Japan continued to prioritize economic growth over defense spending, relying on American military protection to ensure it could focus mainly on economic recovery. Through "guided capitalism," Japan was able to use its resources to economically recover from the war and revive industry, eventually sparking a lengthy period of unprecedented economic growth remembered as the Japanese economic miracle occurred from the 1960s to the Lost Decades of the 1990s.

== Impact ==
=== Prostitution ===
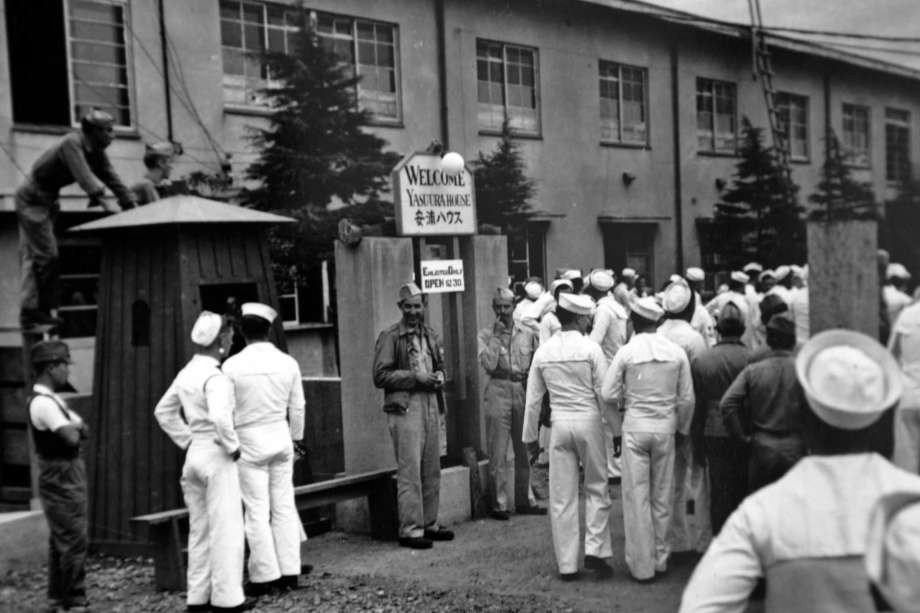
Allied servicemen visit the Special Comfort Facility Association (SCFA).

The day before Japan surrendered, the Japanese organized a brothel system named the Recreation and Amusement Association," or RAA for the benefit of the occupation troops. The Japanese police feared that the Allied occupation troops were likely to rape Japanese women. "The strategy was, through the special work of experienced women, to create a breakwater to protect regular women and girls." A large contributor to this system being hastily implemented was the experience of the prior comfort women system.

In December 1945, a senior officer with the Public Health and Welfare Division of the occupation's General Headquarters wrote regarding prostitutes: "The girl is impressed into contracting by the desperate financial straits of her parents and their urging, occasionally supplemented by her willingness to make such a sacrifice to help her family", he wrote. "It is the belief of our informants, however, that in urban districts the practice of enslaving girls, while much less prevalent than in the past, still exists."

MacArthur issued an order, SCAPIN 642, on January 21 ending licensed brothels for being "in contravention of the ideals of democracy". Although SCAPIN 642 ended the RAA's operations, it did not affect "voluntary prostitution" by individuals. Ultimately, SCAP responded by making all brothels and other facilities offering prostitution off-limits on March 25, 1946. By November, the Japanese government had introduced the new akasen (赤線, "red-line") system in which prostitution was permissible only in certain designated areas.

=== Rape ===
According to Toshiyuki Tanaka, 76 cases of rape or rape-murder were reported during the first five years of the American occupation of Okinawa. However, he asserts this is probably not the true figure, as most cases were unreported. Some historians have estimated that U.S. troops committed thousands of rapes among the population of the Ryukyu Islands during the Okinawa Campaign and the beginning of the American occupation in 1945. One Okinawan historian estimated as many as 10,000 Okinawan women may have been raped in total.

As described above, Japanese authorities had set up a large system of prostitution facilities in order to protect the population from sexual assault. According to John W. Dower, precisely as the Japanese government had hoped when it created the prostitution facilities, while the RAA was in place "the incidence of rape remained relatively low given the huge size of the occupation force." However, there was a resulting large rise in venereal disease among the soldiers, which led MacArthur to close down the prostitution in early 1946. The incidence of rape increased after the closure of the brothels, possibly eight-fold; Dower states that "According to one calculation the number of rapes and assaults on Japanese women amounted to around 40 daily while the RAA was in operation, and then rose to an average of 330 a day after it was terminated in early 1946." Brian Walsh disputes Dower's numbers and states that rape was uncommon throughout the Occupation, with the number of daily rapes being much lower. According to Walsh, the increase in rapes during the termination of the RAA was brief in duration, and the numbers quickly declined thereafter. Michael S. Molasky states that while rape and other violent crime were widespread in naval ports like Yokosuka and Yokohama during the first few weeks of occupation, according to Japanese police reports and journalistic studies, the number of incidents declined shortly after and they were not common on mainland Japan throughout the rest of occupation.

=== Censorship ===
After the surrender of Japan in 1945, SCAP abolished all forms of Japanese censorship and controls on freedom of speech, which would later be enshrined in Article 21 of the 1947 Constitution of Japan. However, two weeks into the Occupation, SCAP began censoring all media; on September 10, 1945, SCAP "issued press and pre-censorship codes outlawing the publication of all reports and statistics 'inimical to the objectives of the Occupation'." This included any mention of rape or other sensitive social issues.

According to David M. Rosenfeld:

Not only did Occupation censorship forbid criticism of the United States or other Allied nations, but the mention of censorship itself was forbidden. This means, as Donald Keene observes, that for some producers of texts "the Occupation censorship was even more exasperating than Japanese military censorship had been because it insisted that all traces of censorship be concealed. This meant that articles had to be rewritten in full, rather than merely submitting XXs for the offending phrases."

— Donald Keene, quoted in Dawn to the West

=== Japanese women ===
It has been argued that the granting of rights to women played an important role in the radical shift Japan underwent from a war nation to a democratized and demilitarized country. In the first postwar general election of 1946, for which Japanese women had suffrage for the first time, over a third of the votes were cast by women. This unexpectedly high female voter turnout led to the election of 39 female candidates, and the increasing presence of women in politics was perceived by Americans as evidence of an improvement of Japanese women's condition.

American feminists saw Japanese women as victims of feudalistic and chauvinistic traditions that had to be broken by the Occupation. American women assumed a central role in the reforms that affected the lives of Japanese women: they educated Japanese about Western ideals of democracy, and it was an American woman, Beate Sirota, who wrote the articles guaranteeing equality between men and women for the new constitution. General Douglas MacArthur did not mean for Japanese women to give up their central role in the home as wives and mothers, but rather that they could now assume other roles simultaneously, such as that of worker.

In 1953, journalist Ichirō Narumigi commented that Japan had received "liberation of sex" along with the "four presents" that it had been granted by the occupation (respect for human rights, gender equality, freedom of speech, and women's enfranchisement). Indeed, the occupation also had a great impact on relationships between men and women in Japan. The "modern girl" phenomenon of the 1920s and early 1930s had been characterized by greater sexual freedom, but, despite this, sex was usually not perceived as a source of pleasure (for women) in Japan. Westerners, as a result, were thought to be promiscuous and sexually deviant. The sexual liberation of European and North American women during World War II was unthinkable in Japan, especially during wartime where rejection of Western ways of life was encouraged.

The Japanese public was thus astounded by the sight of some 45,000 so-called panpan girls (prostitutes) fraternizing with American soldiers during the occupation. In 1946, the 200 wives of U.S. officers landing in Japan to visit their husbands also had a similar impact when many of these reunited couples were seen walking hand-in-hand and kissing in public. Both prostitution and marks of affection had been hidden from the public until then, and this "democratization of eroticism" was a source of surprise, curiosity, and even envy. The occupation set new models for relationships between Japanese men and women: The Western practice of dating spread, and activities such as dancing, movies and coffee were not limited to panpan girls and American troops anymore, and became popular among young Japanese couples.

== Politics ==
Unlike Allied-occupied Germany, the government of Japan continued to exist during the occupation. Although MacArthur's official staff history of the occupation referred to "the Eighth Army Military Government System", it explained that while "In Germany, with the collapse of the Nazi regime, all government agencies disintegrated, or had to be purged", the Japanese retained an "integrated, responsible government and it continued to function almost intact":

In effect, there was no "military government" in Japan in the literal sense of the word. It was simply a SCAP superstructure over already existing government machinery, designed to observe and assist the Japanese along the new democratic channels of administration.

Japanese police forces maintained law and order, unlike the US Army's United States Constabulary in Germany. General Horace Robertson of Australia, head of BCOF, wrote:

MacArthur at no time established in Japan what could be correctly described as Military government. He continued to use the Japanese government to control the country, but teams of military personnel, afterward replaced to quite a considerable extent by civilians, were placed throughout the Japanese prefectures as a check on the extent to which the prefectures were carrying out the directives issued by MacArthur's headquarters or the orders from the central government.
The really important duty of the so called Military government teams was, however, the supervision of the issue throughout Japan of the large quantities of food stuffs and medical stores being poured into the country from American sources. The teams also contained so-called experts on health, education, sanitation, agriculture and the like, to help the Japanese in adopting more up to date methods sponsored by SCAP's headquarters. The normal duties of a military government organisation, the most important of which are law and order and a legal system, were never needed in Japan since the Japanese government's normal legal system still functioned with regard to all Japanese nationals ... The so-called military government in Japan was therefore neither military nor government.

Legally, as had been case before the occupation, the cabinet posts were formally appointed by the Emperor and technically answerable directly to him, although in reality senior figures in the government such as the Prime Minister effectively served at the pleasure of the occupation authorities before the first post-war elections were held. Military posts, such as those of Army and Navy Minister, were left vacant and effectively abolished. The Japanese government's de facto authority was strictly limited especially in the initial months of the occupation.

Political parties had begun to revive almost immediately after the occupation began. Left-wing organizations, such as the Japan Socialist Party and the Japan Communist Party, quickly reestablished themselves, as did various conservative parties. The old Seiyukai and Rikken Minseito returned as, respectively, the Liberal Party (Nihon Jiyuto) and the Japan Progressive Party (Nihon Shimpoto). The first postwar elections were held in 1946 (women were given the franchise for the first time), and the Liberal Party's vice president, Shigeru Yoshida (1878–1967), became prime minister. For the 1947 elections, anti-Yoshida forces left the Liberal Party and joined forces with the Progressive Party to establish the new Japan Democratic Party (Minshuto). This divisiveness in conservative ranks gave a plurality to the Japan Socialist Party, which was allowed to form a cabinet, which lasted less than a year. Thereafter, the socialist party steadily declined in its electoral successes. After a short period of Democratic Party administration, Yoshida returned in late 1948 and continued to serve as prime minister until 1954.

== Japanese American contribution ==
Japan accepted the terms of the Potsdam Declaration on August 15, and officially surrendered on September 2, 1945. Over 5,000 Japanese Americans served in the occupation of Japan. Dozens of Japanese Americans served as translators, interpreters, and investigators in the International Military Tribunal for the Far East. Thomas Sakamoto served as press escort during the occupation of Japan. He escorted American correspondents to Hiroshima, and the USS Missouri in Tokyo Bay. Sakamoto was one of three Japanese Americans to be on board the USS Missouri when the Japanese formally surrendered. Arthur S. Komori served as personal interpreter for Brig. Gen. Elliot R. Thorpe. Kay Kitagawa served as personal interpreter of Fleet Admiral William Halsey Jr. Kan Tagami served as personal interpreter-aide for General Douglas MacArthur. Journalist Don Caswell was accompanied by a Japanese American interpreter to Fuchū Prison, where the Japanese government imprisoned communists Kyuichi Tokuda, Yoshio Shiga, and Shiro Mitamura.

== Criticism ==
On the day the occupation of Japan was over, the Asahi Shimbun published a very critical essay on the occupation, calling it "almost akin to colonialism" and claiming it turned the Japanese population "irresponsible, obsequious and listless... unable to perceive issues in a forthright manner, which led to distorted perspectives".

== See also ==
- 1945 in Japan
- 1971 Okinawa Reversion Agreement
- Beate Sirota Gordon
- Cold War
- Japanese economic miracle
- Our Job in Japan - American occupation military training film
- Postwar Japan
- Security Treaty Between the United States and Japan
- Shipping Control Authority for the Japanese Merchant Marine
- Valery Burati
