= Bloody May Day (1952) =

Riots in Japan on May 1, 1952

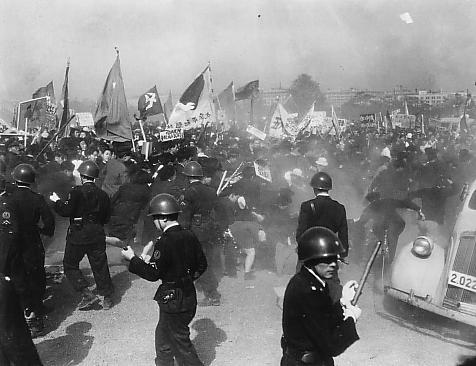
- Date: May 1, 1952
- Location: Kokyo Gaien National Garden, Tokyo, Japan
- Caused by: Opposition to the Security Treaty between the United States and Japan

Parties
Labor unionists organized by the Sōhyō labor federation Zengakuren student activists Zainichi Korean activists Communist Party members	Police officers of the Tokyo Metropolitan Police Department

Number
~5,000	~1,500

Casualties and losses
2 dead ~1,500 injured	~800 injured

Casualties
- Arrested: 1,232

Bloody May Day (血のメーデー事件, Chi no mēdē jiken) refers to a violent conflict that took place between protesters and police officers in the Kokyo Gaien National Garden in front of the Imperial Palace in Tokyo, Japan, on May 1, 1952. When a large crowd protesting the U.S.—Japan Security Treaty refused to disband, a bloody melee took place between protesters and police officers. Eventually the police officers opened fire on the crowd, killing 2 and injuring 22 with bullet wounds. Altogether, around 2,300 people (1,500 protesters and 800 police officers) were injured in the fighting.

== Background ==
After Japan was defeated in World War II, a United States-led military occupation ruled the country for seven years, from 1945 to 1952. As a condition of ending the occupation, Japan was forced to sign the U.S.—Japan Security Treaty which allowed the United States to maintain military forces on Japanese soil. This treaty came into force on April 28, 1952, in tandem with the Treaty of San Francisco, which officially ended World War II in Asia. The United States also refused to return Okinawa to Japan, maintaining it as a de facto U.S. colony.

Three days after the coming into force of these treaties, on May 1—a traditional date for annual "May Day" protests in socialist and leftist circles—the left leaning national labor federation Sōhyō made plans for a nationwide day of protest in cities and towns across Japan to convey widespread popular outrage at the one-sided peace and security treaties that would enshrine Japan's "subordinate independence" under U.S. hegemony, and the Japanese government's failure to secure the retrocession of Okinawa. Altogether more than a million people participated in 331 protest gatherings across the country.

Meanwhile in 1950, at the behest of Soviet premier Joseph Stalin, the Soviet-led Cominform had published a tract harshly criticizing the policies of the Japanese Communist Party (JCP) of peaceful protest and engagement with electoral politics, which led the JCP to completely change its policies and attempt to foment an immediate, violent revolution in Japan along Maoist lines. In May 1952, the JCP was still attempting to foment a violent communist revolution, and thus, supported by radical student activists from the nationwide Zengakuren student federation and Zainichi Korean activist groups, the JCP sought to infiltrate Sōhyō's peaceful May 1 protest movement and instigate the masses to engage in violent attacks on police and American military targets.

== Violence in Tokyo ==
Although most gatherings around the nation were peaceful, violence broke out in central Tokyo when protesters attempted to occupy the plaza in front of the Imperial Palace (present-day Kokyo Gaien park). This plaza was a traditional site for annual May Day protests but in 1952, fearing popular outrage in the aftermath of the protests, the Japanese government declared that the plaza would henceforth be closed to public gatherings. Sōhyō sought to follow the new regulations and had its members gather at Meiji Shrine instead. However, Zengakuren student activists, Zainichi activists, and other JCP-affiliated instigators led a large group of protesters on a march from Meiji Shrine to the Imperial Palace to "retake" the "people's plaza."

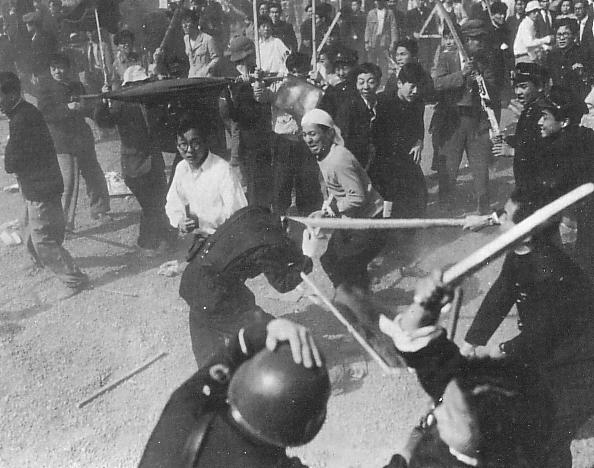
Protesters battle with police in the "people's plaza"

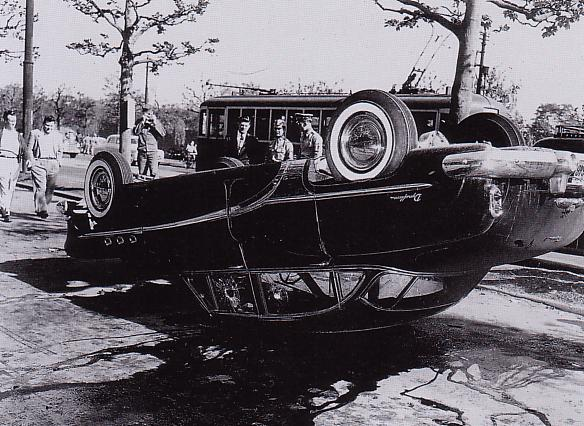
An American-owned vehicle overturned by angry protesters

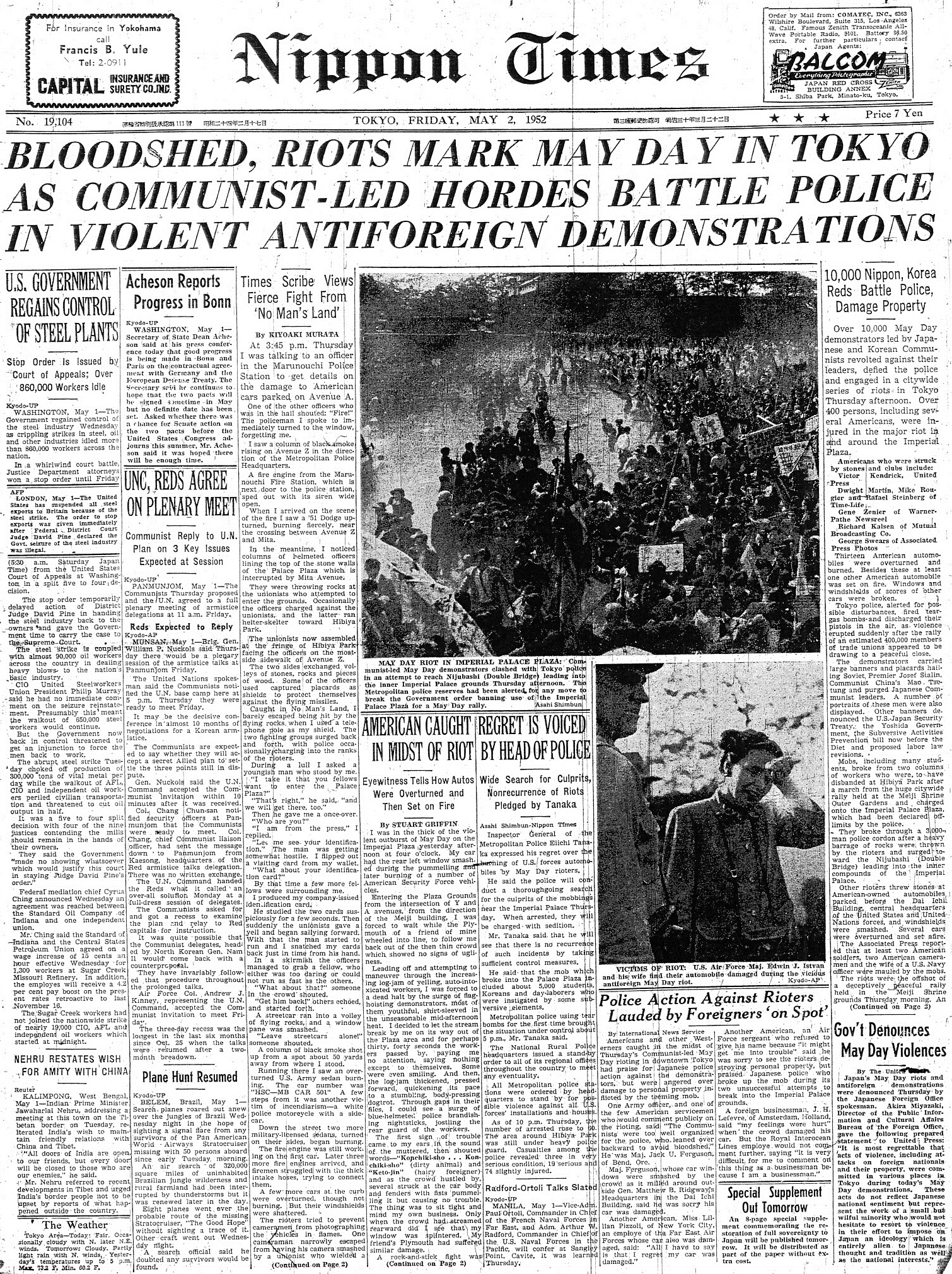
Front page of the Nippon Times on May 2, 1952

Initially, the protesters succeeded in occupying the plaza without incident, gathering together to wave flags, snake dance, and sing protest songs. However shortly thereafter a large contingent of police officers arrived on the scene and commanded the protesters to clear the plaza. The protesters refused to leave, and a bloody struggle commenced in which protesters armed with paving stones, baseball bats, wooden staves, pachinko balls, bamboo spears, and even some Molotov cocktails faced off against police armed with pistols, tear gas, and batons. Eventually, the police fired what they later claimed were "warning shots" with their service pistols, but some of these shots were aimed directly into the crowd, killing two protesters and wounding twenty-two others.

With the eruption of gunfire, many protesters panicked and attempted to flee the plaza, leading to further clashes with police. Retreating protesters overturned and set fire to dozens of American-owned military vehicles parked along the road. With chants of "Yankee go home!" (yankii go homu), they also attacked American bystanders, including reporters and American soldiers. Three American GIs were hurled into the palace moat and stoned before they were saved through the intercession of other Japanese.

== Aftermath ==
Altogether 1,232 protesters were arrested, of whom 261 were charged with sedition and put on trial. The trials associated with the Bloody May Day incident dragged out for decades due to lengthy appeals processes. It was not until November 21, 1972, that the Tokyo High Court acquitted the final 16 defendants as part of a prosecutorial appeal of their earlier acquittals in lower courts, and prosecutors declined to appeal to the Supreme Court of Japan.

In the immediate aftermath of the Bloody May Day incident, the National Diet passed the Subversive Activities Prevention Act, which prescribed stiffer legal penalties for persons convicted of engaging in specified "terroristic subversive activities," and granted the government the power to suppress or even dissolve organizations involved in carrying out these activities.

Sporadic violence continued across the country throughout the summer of 1952. For example, anti-American protesters clashed with police in Osaka in June, and hurled Molotov cocktails at police and American military vehicles in Nagoya in July. Later that year, popular outrage at the continuing presence of military bases in Japan even after the Occupation had ended would coalesce into a nationwide anti-base movement, beginning with large-scale anti-base protests at Uchinada in Ishikawa Prefecture from 1952 to 1953.

In the fall 1952 general election, Japanese voters punished the Communist Party for their violent policies, and the JCP lost every single one of its 35 seats in the lower house of the Diet. Thereafter the JCP began to retreat from militancy and return to its former peaceful line, but it would take the party decades to recover its old strength. The party would not fully recover until the 1972 general election, when it sent 38 members to the Diet.
