= Kokyo Gaien National Garden =

Park and garden in Tokyo, Japan

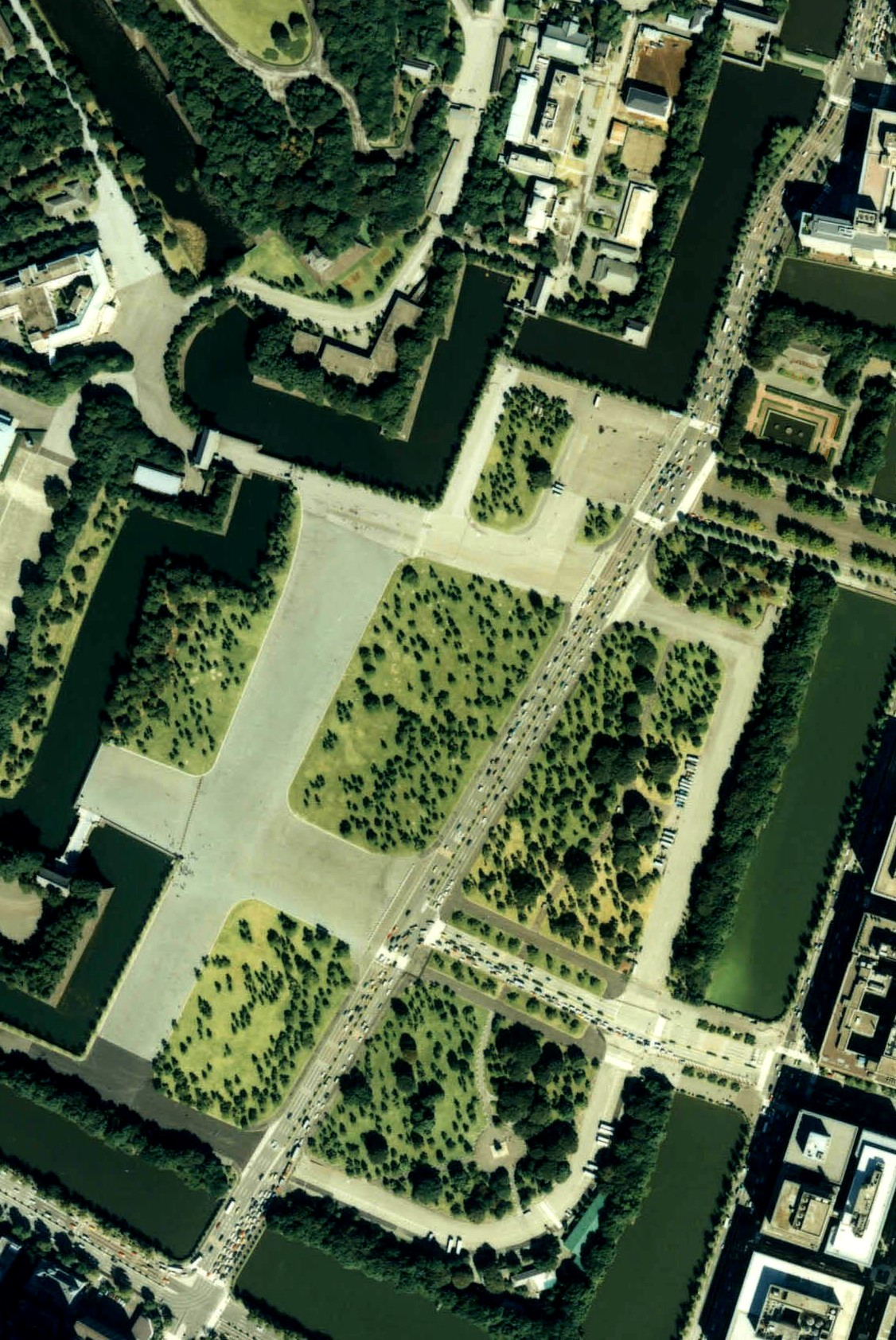
- Aerial view of the garden, 1989

- Location within Japan
- Type: Garden and park
- Location: Tokyo Imperial Palace
- Coordinates: 35.680°N 139.758°E
- Area: About 450,000 square metres (110 acres)
- Created: 1 June 1949
- Operator: Ministry of the Environment

Kokyo Gaien National Garden (or Kōkyogaien 皇居外苑, literally 'Imperial Palace Outer Garden') is located in Chiyoda, Tokyo, just south of the Tokyo Imperial Palace.

== Area ==
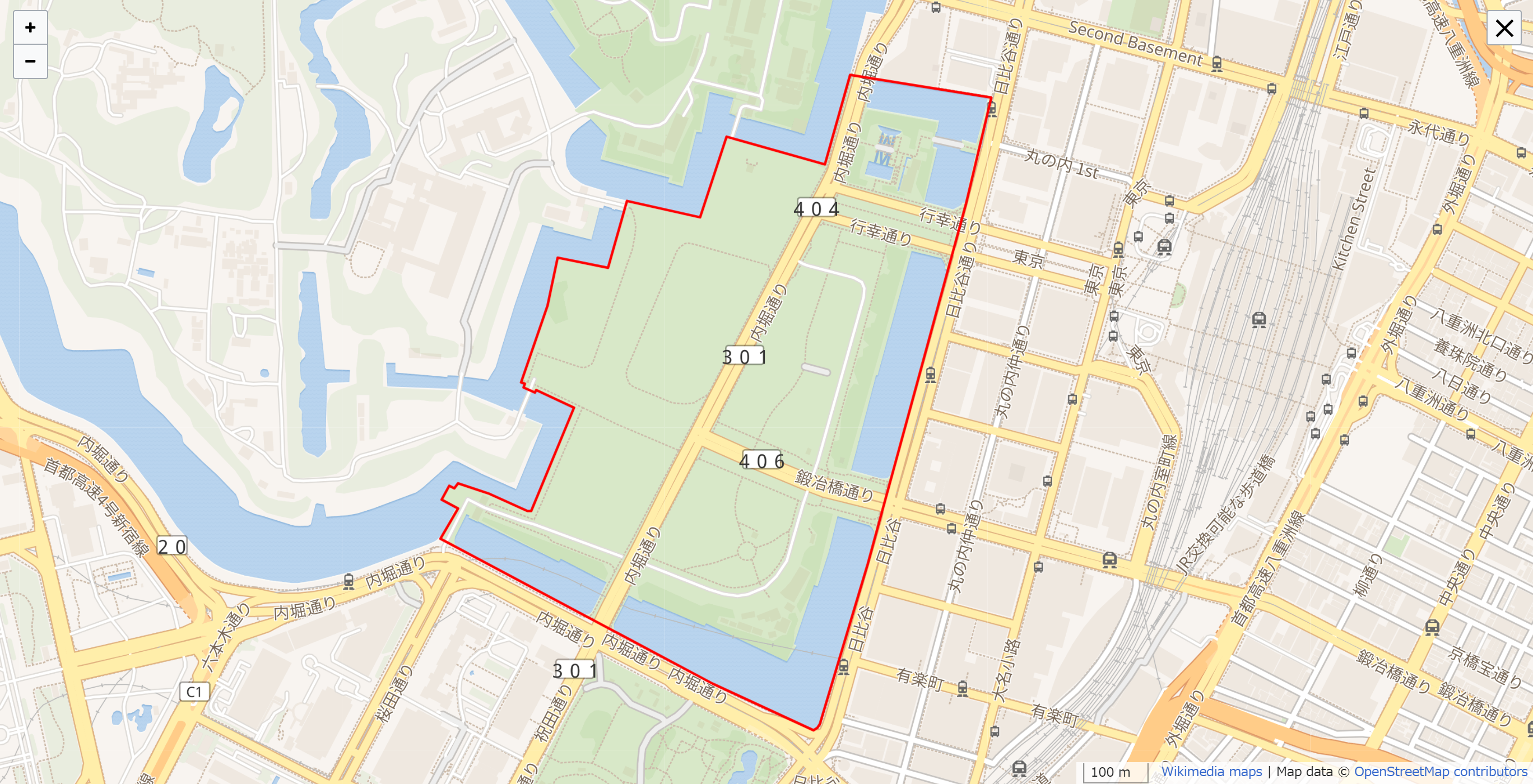
Map showing the area of the Garden

The Kokyo Gaien National Garden has an area of about 450,000 m^{2}.

== Overview ==
Though it has no playground equipment, it is often used as a place to relax and enjoy the history of Edo Castle and walk around the square. There is surveillance by the Imperial Palace Police and the Tokyo Metropolitan Police Department, as it is adjacent to the Imperial Palace.

== Facilities and attractions ==
- Square in front of the Imperial Palace – A very large open space despite being in the center of the city
- Seimon Tetsubashi – The bridge once had a two-tiered structure
- Sakurada Gate – It is designated as Important Cultural Property
- Sakashita Gate – Currently used as a gate for the Imperial Household Agency
- Kikyo Gate – The headquarters of the Imperial Police are located inside the gate
- Statue of Kusunoki Masashige
- Wadakura Fountain Park – It opened in 1961 to commemorate the marriage of Emperor Akihito
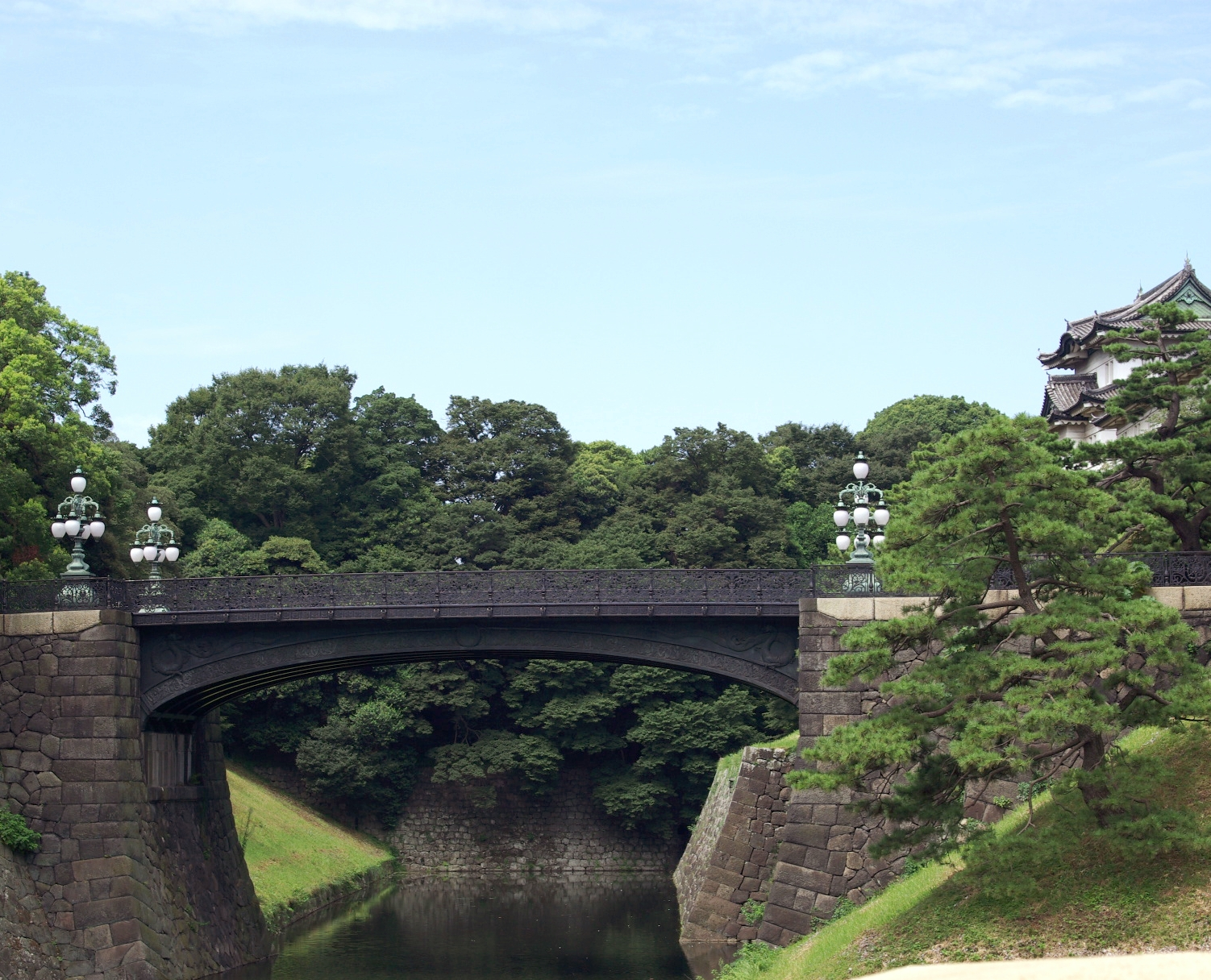
Seimon Tetsubashi

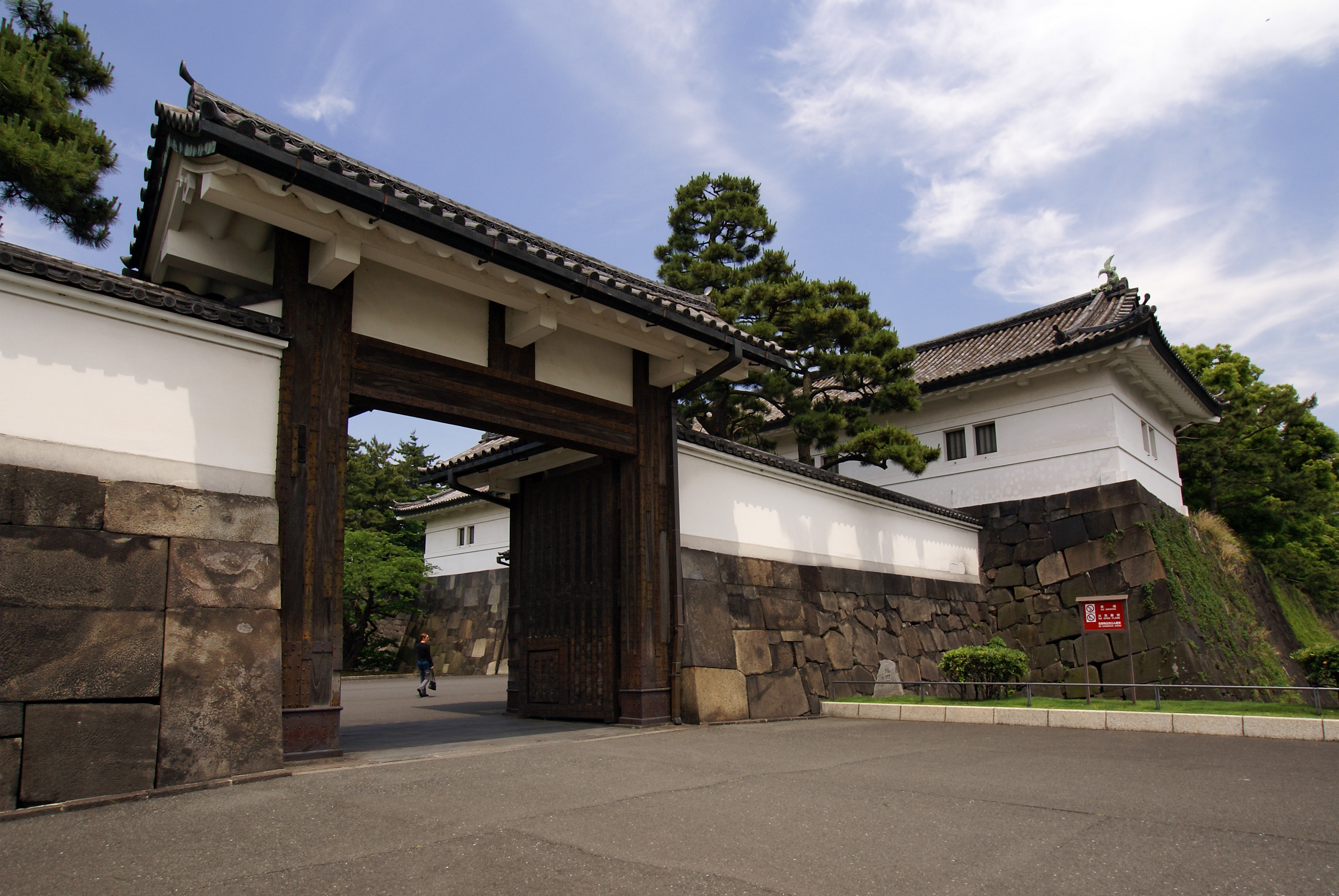
Sakurada Gate

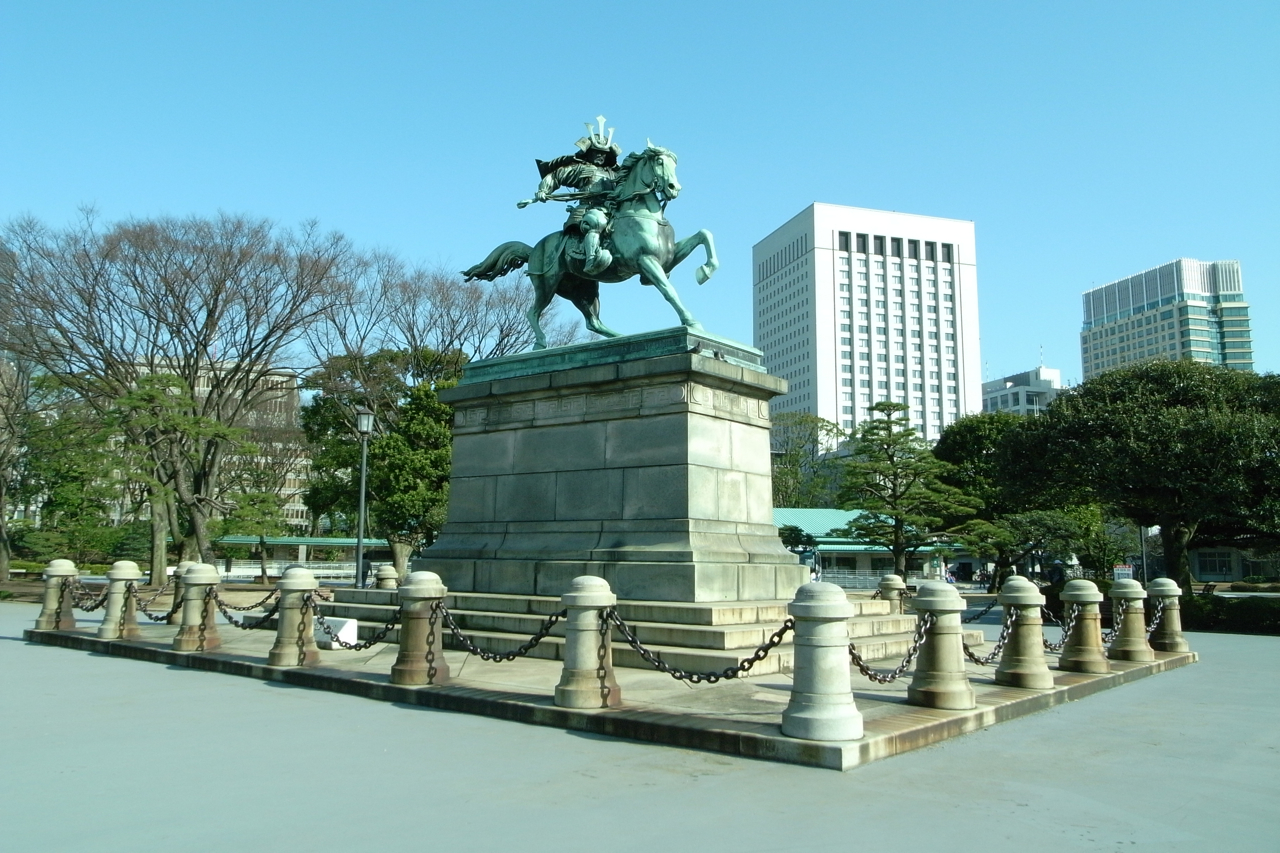
Statue of Kusunoki Masashige

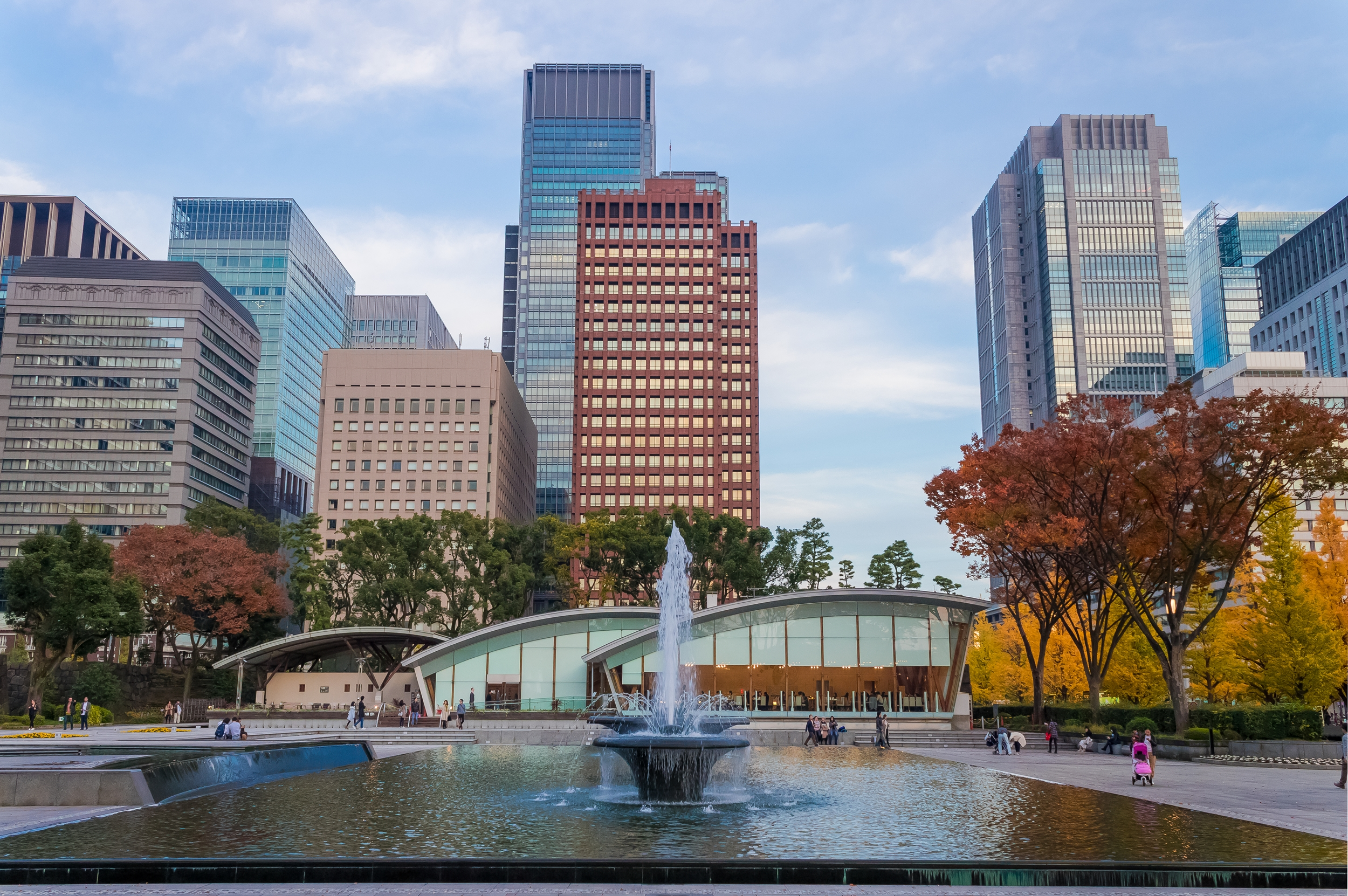
Wadakura Fountain Park

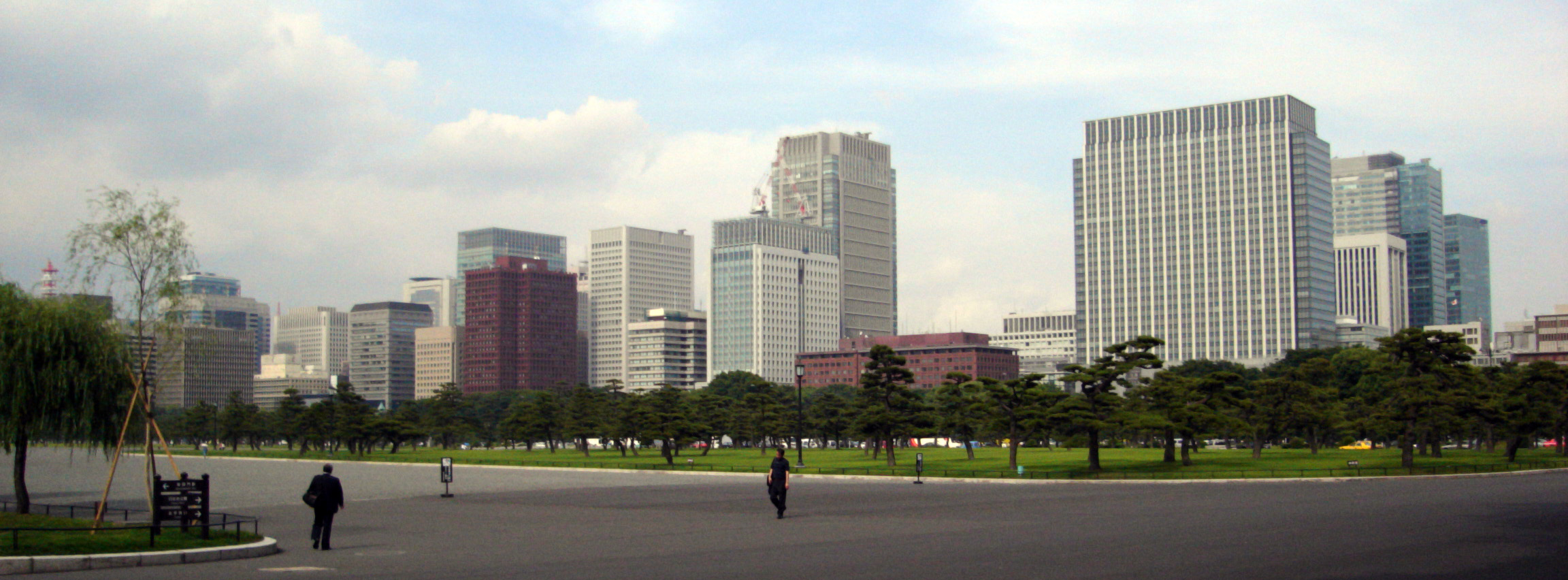
Marunouchi office district seen from Imperial Palace Square
