= 1968–1969 Japanese university protests =

Student protests in Japan

- Part of the protests of 1968 and the Cold War
- Students protesting at the University of Tokyo
- Location: Japan
- Caused by: Rise of the Japanese New Left
- Methods: Occupations of campus buildings

Parties
Students: Zenkyōtō; Zengakuren; Pro-Japanese Communist Party students (Minseidō); Chūkaku-ha; Kakumaru-ha; Shaseidō Kaihō-ha; Second Bund; Other groups within the Japanese New Left	(Japan) Government: Ministry of Education; National Police Agency; Individual university administrations; Conservative and right-wing student groups

Lead figures
Non-centralised leadership: Takaaki Yoshimoto; Kan'ichi Kuroda; Yoshitaka Yamamoto; Mitsuko Tokoro; Akehiro Akita	Eisaku Satō (Prime Minister of Japan); Hirokichi Nadao (Minister of Education before November 1968); Michita Sakata (Minister of Education after November 1968)

In 1968 and 1969, student protests at several Japanese universities ultimately forced the closure of campuses across Japan. Known as daigaku funsō (大学紛争, lit. 'university troubles') or daigaku tōsō (大学闘争, 'university struggles'), the protests were part of the worldwide protest cycle in 1968 and the late-1960s Japanese protest cycle, including the Anpo protests of 1970 and the struggle against the construction of Narita Airport. Students demonstrated initially against practical issues in universities and eventually formed the Zenkyōtō in mid-1968 to organize themselves. The Act on Temporary Measures concerning University Management allowed for the dispersal of protesters in 1969.

Initially, demonstrations were organized to protest against unpaid internships at the University of Tokyo Medical School. Building on years of student organization and protest, New Left student organizations began occupying buildings around campus. The other main campus where the protests originated was Nihon University. They began with student discontent over alleged corruption in the university board of directors. At Nihon, protests were driven less by ideology and more by pragmatism because of the university's traditional and conservative nature. The movement spread to other Japanese universities, escalating into violence both on campus and in the streets. In late 1968, at the zenith of the movement, thousands of students entered Tokyo's busiest railway station, Shinjuku, and rioted. Factional infighting (uchi-geba, 内ゲバ) was rampant among these students. In January 1969, the police besieged the University of Tokyo and ended the protests there, leading to renewed fervor from students at other universities, where protests continued. However, as public support for the students fell, and the police increased their efforts to stop the protests, the movement waned. The passage of the 1969 Act on Temporary Measures concerning University Management gave police the legal basis to apply more forceful measures, although splinter groups of the New Left groups, such as the United Red Army, continued their violence into the 1970s.

As part of an International Phenomenon in the 68s (see May 68, New Communist Movement), Japanese New Left activists drew ideological inspiration that heavily influenced by the Cultural Revolution taking place in China. Some other groups and factions also inspired by Leon Trotsky, French existentialist philosophers like Jean-Paul Sartre and Albert Camus, and the homegrown philosophy of the Japanese poet and critic Takaaki Yoshimoto. Yoshimoto's interpretation of "autonomy" (jiritsusei) and "subjectivity" (shutaisei) were based on his critique of the progressive liberal interpretations of these ideas by other Japanese intellectuals such as Masao Maruyama, whom he denounced as hypocritical. The students' devotion to shutaisei in particular would lead ultimately to the disintegration of their movement, as they focused increasingly on "self-negation" (jiko hitei) and "self-criticism" (hansei).

The university troubles helped in the emergence of Mitsu Tanaka's Women's Liberation (Ūman Ribu) movement. While most disputes had settled down by the 1970s and many of the students had reintegrated into Japanese society, the protests' ideas entered the cultural sphere, inspiring writers like Haruki Murakami and Ryū Murakami. The students' political demands made education reform a priority for the Japanese government, which it tried to address through organizations such as the Central Council for Education. The protests have been the subject of modern popular media, such as Kōji Wakamatsu's 2007 film United Red Army.

== Origins of student activism ==
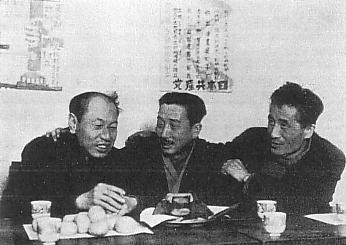
JCP leaders Kyuichi Tokuda, Sanzō Nosaka and Yoshio Shiga (from left to right) immediately following the end of the Second World War

The Allied Occupation of Japan from the end of the Second World War to 1952 brought significant changes to Japanese politics. The occupation authorities repealed the Peace Preservation Law, which had been enacted before the war to target left-wing groups specifically and arrest their members. Left-wing prisoners incarcerated under this law were released. The Japanese Communist Party (JCP) and the Japanese Socialist Party (JSP) were legalized and became influential within Japanese politics. The JCP focused on increasing their support among students, which led to the association of students with left-wing activism. The occupation authorities promulgated the post-war Constitution of Japan, which gave political organizations the right to exist and workers the right to organize. Left-wing groups supported the Constitution and students sought to protect it and defend themselves against actions by the Japanese state they viewed as unconstitutional.

Occupation authorities restructured the Japanese education system by repealing the Imperial Rescript on Education, decentralizing the administration of the education system, and introducing the American-based 6-3-3-4 school system (six years of primary school, three years of junior secondary school, three years of senior secondary school, and four years of tertiary education), making at least nine years of education mandatory. High school admission continued to be rare and competitive. The 1949 National School Establishment Law expanded the higher education system, leading to local higher education institutions being consolidated into national universities, ensuring the existence of state-supported universities in every prefecture. This standardization later resulted in an increasing number of students ready to go on to high school, which led to the creation of more private high schools by the Ministry of Education (MoE). The number of high school graduates grew to 90% of students by the 1960s, putting pressure on higher education institutions to expand, and for secondary education institutions to extend into tertiary education.

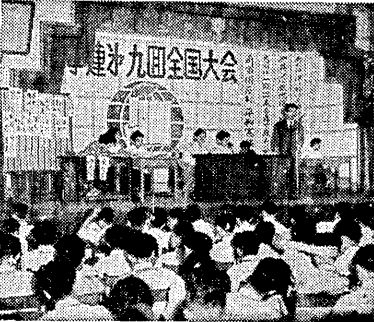
9th Central Committee Convention of Zengakuren (1956)

The rise of left-wing sympathies among students led to the creation of the Zengakuren, a socialist student organization formed in 1948. Zengakuren grew out of a 1947–48 protest against an increase in university fees led by student supporters of the JCP. With Zengakuren, the student movement had a banner to rally under. In the 1950s, New Left movements that had evolved from Zengakuren, which were unaffiliated with the JCP, sprang up within the student movement. Some of Zengakuren's student leaders, for example, split from the JCP to form the Communist League, a Leninist group known as the "Bund" which took their name from the German name of the Communist League of Karl Marx's time. Groups that followed the theory of Leon Trotsky came together to form the Japan Revolutionary Communist League (Kakukyōdō), and less radical Zengakuren leaders within the Bund led the Student Socialist League (Shakai Gakusei Dōmei, shortened to Shagakudō). These factions wrested control of Zengakuren from the JCP for the New Left.

In 1960, a broad coalition of left-wing groups including the JCP, the JSP, Zengakuren, and the Sōhyō trade federation representing Japanese trade unions carried out massive protests against renewal of the Treaty of Mutual Cooperation and Security Between the United States and Japan (known commonly as Anpo). For Zengakuren, Anpo marked a renewal and strengthening of their political program and the eclipsing of the Old Left by the New Left. During the Anpo protests of 1960, a split occurred between two leading left-wing intellectuals – Masao Maruyama and Takaaki Yoshimoto. Maruyama saw the protest as an example of the enacting of the concept of shutaisei (subjectivity), or the idea of the autonomy of society from the state and the self, and as a shining beacon of democratic ideals. Yoshimoto saw the protest as a reaction against capitalist alienation, not as an act of protecting democracy. Yoshimoto accused Maruyama and his supporters of being duplicitous, hypocritical, and going against shutaisei by deceiving themselves into believing they were against the war and the heralds of popular democracy. The New Left, especially the Bund, took up Yoshimoto's ideas and his critique of Maruyama and Japanese progressivism. Zengakuren attacked the JCP, the progressives, and anything else they deemed as the "Establishment" as organizations that threatened shutaisei by destroying the autonomy of the self and replacing it with a vanguard. This marked the turn of the Japanese New Left against mainstream progressivism and orthodox Stalinism.

By the late 1960s, the number of university students and universities reached an all-time high, with 52 universities in Tokyo providing a haven for New Left radicals. The lack of post-war publication censorship, the printing of affordable Marxist texts and the abundance of free time at university led to the radicalization of many more students. The generation born in the postwar baby boom had reached university and universities had accommodated this change by opening up thousands of additional spaces. Tensions had already risen, and the student movement had been mostly dormant since the Anpo protests. The situation in the universities had become increasingly unstable, leading to the 1968 protests.

== Initial skirmishes ==
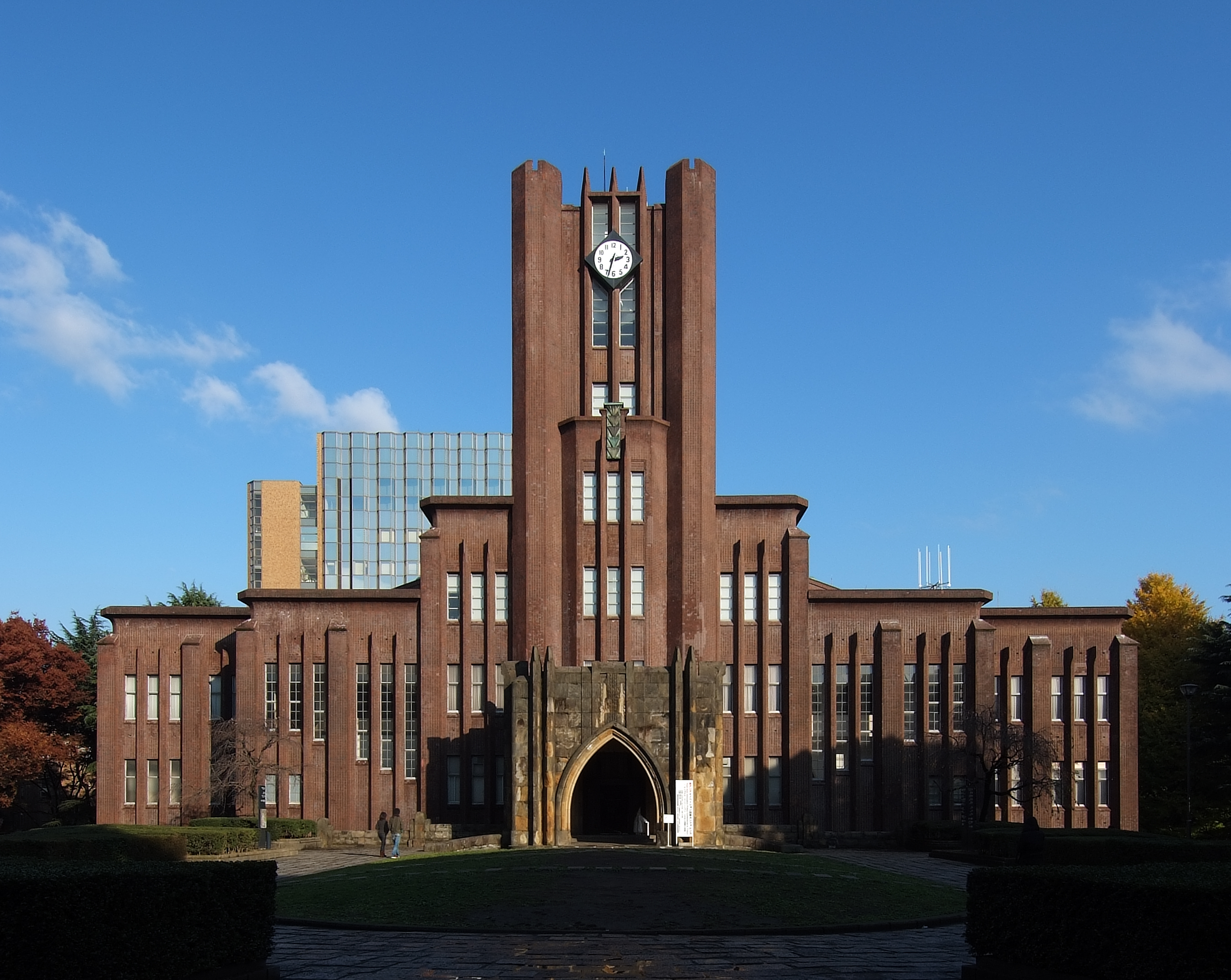
Yasuda Auditorium, one of the most iconic buildings of the University of Tokyo's Hongō campus

Student unrest reemerged with protests at Keio University in 1965 and Waseda University in 1966 being the first to use the name "All-Campus Joint Struggle Committees" (Zenkyōtō) to refer to the student organizations coordinating the protests. The Waseda disturbances lasted 150 days, ending when student activism calmed down nationwide. A controversial reform made by the University of Tokyo in late 1967 regarding medical internship, seen as six years of free labor by medical students, led to a student strike at the university in early 1968. A fight on February 19 between a tutor and students caused by the controversy over internship reform led to the punishment of 17 students and the expulsion of four. Medical students, who disrupted graduation ceremonies at the university in March, deemed some of the punishment as absurd, as one of the students was not in Tokyo at the day of the fight but in Kyushu. As riot police were called in to protect these ceremonies, the students moved to occupy Yasuda Hall in June. The University of Tokyo decided to take measures to take back Yasuda Hall from student occupation and clear its barricades. However, this led to outrage amongst the student population, which re-occupied the hall and called a general strike.

The protests by the University of Tokyo medical students spilled over to other universities. One of the first was Nihon University (known commonly as Nichidai), which saw 10,000 of its 86,000 students demonstrating in May 1968 over the suspicious use of two billion yen of funds by the university's board of directors. Students accused the board of "money-making" in a "mass-production university". Although the political ideologies of the universities were different, the University of Tokyo was an elite school whose students had left-wing sympathies, while Nihon University was more conservative and repressive. The protests used similar tactics, such as the occupation of important university buildings, whose use later allowed for the formation of Zenkyōtō groups in different universities.

== Zenkyōtō and spread of the movement ==
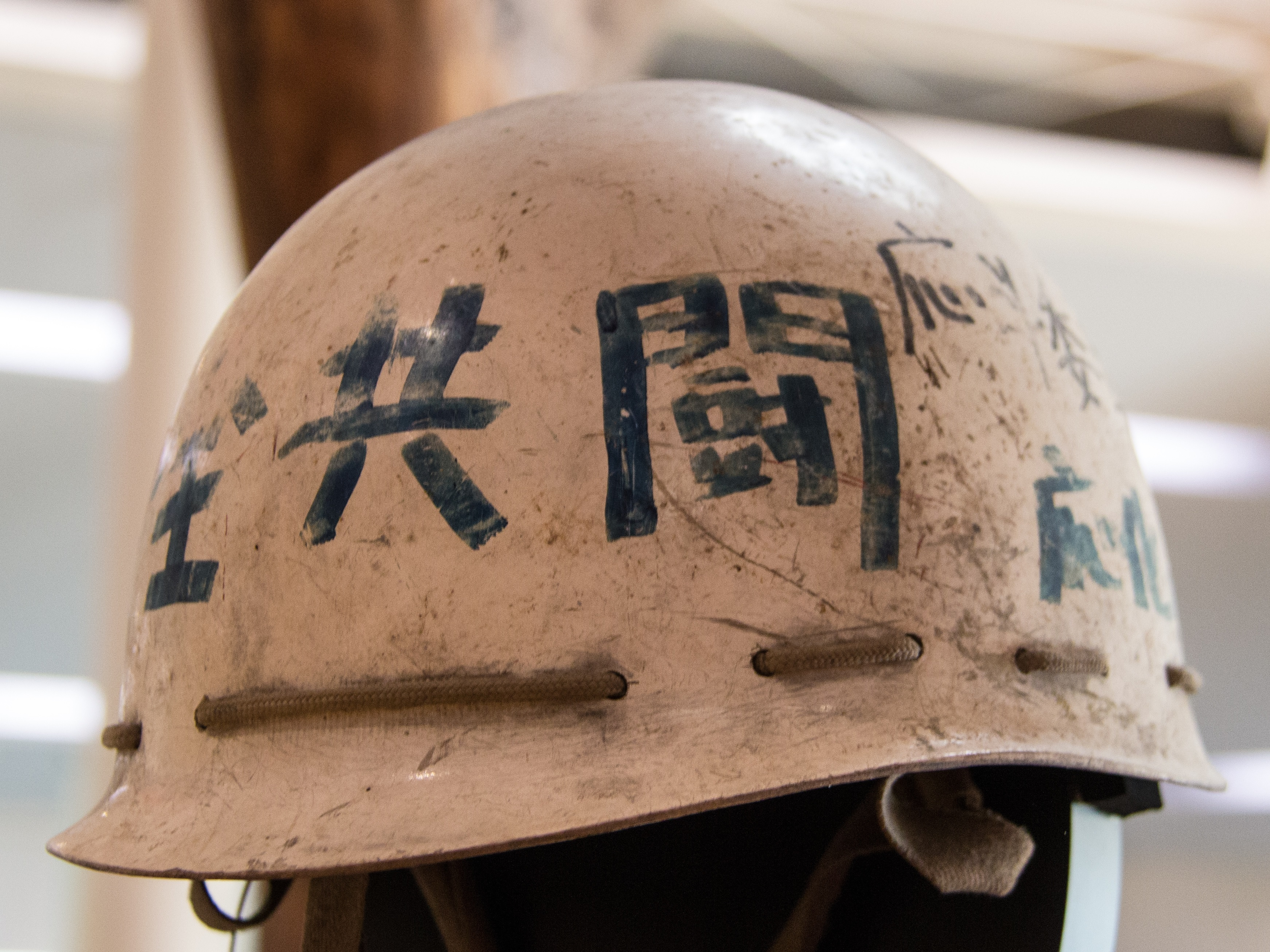
A helmet emblazoned with the word "Zenkyōtō"

In July 1968, the University of Tokyo Zenkyōtō, (Note: Zenkyōtō (Japanese: 全共闘) is short for Zengaku kyōtō kaigi (Japanese: 全学共闘会議).) or All-Campus Joint Struggle Committee was formed to coordinate protests at different universities across the country. Non-sectarian postgraduate student Yoshitaka Yamamoto was elected leader of this Zenkyōtō. Although it had previously existed, the University of Tokyo popularized the Zenkyōtō model. This served as the mainstream interpretation of the model after this point. The Zenkyōtō brought the actions of non-sectarian activists – (Note: These activists were referred to as nonpori, short for "non-political".) people who did not follow any set path to revolution and were unaffiliated with either Zengakuren or the JCP – to light. This contrasted with the pre-Zenkyōtō situation, where activists were split into 39 groups affiliated with Zengakuren and opposed to the JCP and one group that was pro-JCP. The Zenkyōtō helped to expand the scope of protestors. Whereas only undergraduate students protested against Anpo in 1960, the Zenkyōtō included graduate students and some members of staff. The Zenkyōtō at Nihon University helped students push back against conservative influence on the student movement.

In July 1968, the Zenkyōtō at the University of Tokyo demanded that all senior medical staff at the university resign. This led to the resignations of the director of the University of Tokyo Hospital and the dean of the Faculty of Medicine on August 10. In the same month, talks broke down, violence reemerged on campus, and the Zenkyōtō slowly lost control to different organizations. In November, members of the Kakumaru-ha, a breakaway organization of the Trotskyist Japan Revolutionary Communist League, took nine professors as hostages, including Literature Faculty Dean Kentarō Hayashi. Discussing the protests, Hayashi described how many professors like him were interrogated ruthlessly for days and verbally abused by students. The Shaseidō Kaihō-ha, another Zengakuren organization, and the Minsei Dōmei, a Zengakuren clique aligned with the JCP, became involved. These factions brought factionalist divisions onto campus, leading to fights where non-sectarian students intervened to either break them up or provide first aid. This three-way internal conflict took place mostly at the Komaba campus of the University of Tokyo. In December, a fight between the Shaseidō Kaihō-ha and the Kakumaru-ha at Waseda University that started over an accusation of the theft of papers spilled over to the University of Tokyo, where the factions occupied different buildings belonging to the university's Literature Department and built barricades. This dispute lasted three weeks, leading to the withdrawal of the Kakumaru-ha from the Zenkyōtō. Different Zengakuren factions controlled different buildings from then on.

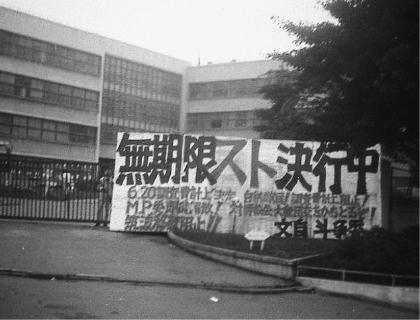
Gate of the Tokyo University of Education (present-day Tsukuba University) during the student strikes of 1968–69. The sign reads, "Indefinite Strike".

In the meantime, protests spread across many universities in Japan. Students at different universities protested different things. At Kansei Gakuin University and Tōhoku University, students protested rising tuition costs. They called for university democratization at Kanagawa University and Beppu University. At Doshisha University and Waseda University, the protest's primary focus was giving the students a role in electing the university rector, and students aimed to gain control of student association buildings at Nagasaki University and Hanazono University. Sophia University shut down its campus for six months. An American jet crashed into the computer center at Kyushu University, sparking anti-American protests aimed at shutting down Brady Air Base. By the end of 1968, students had seized control of 67 campuses, with hundreds of campuses subject to significant student unrest. Protests also occurred outside of university campuses. Thousands of students entered Shinjuku Station on October 21 (International Anti-War Day) and rioted, leading the police to invoke the Riotous Assembly Crime Act. The scale of the riot provoked public backlash that increased public support for the police, which led them to use more force when assaulting occupied campuses. The Sophia University occupation, for example, collapsed in December 1968 after a police siege of the campus.

Violence escalated in the autumn of 1968. Until then, police viewed students as part of the widespread anti-Liberal Democratic Party (LDP) movement that included opposition parties and labor unions. However, increasing violence, which resulted in less public support for the students, led the police to single out student radicals. The students fought with staves made of wood or bamboo known as Gewalt Staves, or gebaruto-bō in Japanese (abbreviated as geba-bō). The word Gewalt means "violence" or "force" in German, to students a valid means towards achieving political goals.

== Decline and fall ==
There is silence in the midst of battle,
Peace in the midst of war and
Order in the midst of struggle.

— Unknown author, translated poem found on the walls of Yasuda Hall

At the beginning of 1969, the students were hopeful they would hold out against the police. As violence continued, the government canceled the spring 1969 university entrance exams. The situation was hectic on the University of Tokyo campus. Minsei, the pro-JCP clique of Zengakuren, was winning, which pressured the University of Tokyo Zenkyōtō to call in student reinforcements from Nihon University and Chuo University. The students became disillusioned, resulting in many of them voting to stop the strikes at the University of Tokyo. The hardliners, however, holed up in buildings like Yasuda Hall, readied themselves for a siege.

On 18 January 1969, thousands of police moved onto the University of Tokyo campus. Nationalist writer Yukio Mishima was so alarmed by the siege that he contacted the police to tell them to be careful. Conflict continued among the disparate Zengakuren cliques and Zenkyōtō, although their power had been greatly reduced. Despite the conviction of the groups in Yasuda Hall that they would win the conflict, the weekend ended with police in control of the roof of Yasuda Hall, the final holdout of the University of Tokyo student movement. This fight was a low point for the student movement – the number of occupied university campuses had declined to 33. Following the siege, Mishima addressed the students, criticizing them for not believing strongly enough to die for their cause. The television broadcasts of the fighting in Yasuda Hall only increased the fervor of student activists elsewhere.

The explosion of student unrest following the Yasuda Hall siege led to the number of occupied campuses skyrocketing from 33 to 77 by March and 111 by April. However, the government paid close attention to the protests, and police strengthened their stance against them. In February, the barricades at Nihon University were dismantled, and the university reopened its classes. Its entrance exams were held under heavy police guard. Attention shifted to Kyoto University, where the Kyoto Zenkyōtō and the local Minsei chapter, supported by the Kyoto University authorities, had been fighting viciously. Following a fight that ended at Nihon University, Zenkyōtō students declared central Kyoto a "liberated area", and riot police were called in to deal with the students. Entrance exams were held in March in emergency centers in Kyoto under police protection, following which the protests at Kyoto University fizzled out. On Okinawa Day, students clashed with police in central Tokyo against the background of a much larger protest against the American occupation of Okinawa. Student activity spiked again in June, as they allied with other left-wing groups to protest against the Vietnam War.

In late 1968, Prime Minister Eisaku Sato appointed educationist Michita Sakata, who previously called for a special investigation into university deficiencies in 1968, as Minister of Education. Sakata, now tasked with trying to deal with calls for government intervention in the universities, did so by promulgating the Act on Temporary Measures concerning University Management in May 1969. The government rushed it through the National Diet and implemented it as law in August. The law called for the creation of the Extra Council on University Disputes and made it possible for university authorities to call in riot police to resolve disputes with students. This legislation served as a heavy blow for the already declining student groups and was one of the key factors in their demise.

By the end of 1969, the students had been broken. Many barricades had been dismantled, and violence slowly dissipated. The National Zenkyōtō, formed in 1969, whose activity peaked in September with a rally held in Hibiya Park, fractured from infighting. Movements became isolated. Despite the destruction of any unity between Zenkyōtō, students continued to riot in the streets, with more of their attention turned to concerns like the war in Vietnam and the upcoming renewal of the Anpo treaty. In 1970, the situation on campuses returned to normal.

== Factions ==
Infighting between Anti-Yoyogi (anti-JCP) (Note: The Anti-Yoyogi tendency was named so because the JCP was headquartered in Yoyogi.) groups, Minsei, and others plagued the university struggles. The Chūkaku-ha and Kakumaru-ha were the two main factions of the Trotskyist Kakukyōdō. The Chūkaku-ha agreed with the Bund and posited that the institution of the university had been brought under capitalism from its previously free status, and that the struggles represented the contradictions within capitalism. The Kakumaru-ha believed because of the imperialistic nature of the university, students could never influence society by entering its administration. (They were also anti-Zenkyōtō, having fought against them at Waseda University in late 1969). Both also disagreed politically – although they were both Marxist. Kakumaru-ha advocated for a focus on the creation of an anti-Stalinist party, while the Chūkaku-ha focused more on class war and the mobilization of the proletariat. The Chūkaku-ha criticized Kakumaru-ha as being petite bourgeois. The Shaseidō Kaihō-ha believed that the problem with the university was its educational ideology of preparing students to become "slaves" in industry. The Bund was much more hierarchical compared to other student groups. Ideologically, they focused on the defense of Japanese democracy from fascism instead of destroying the university. Minsei, as a more reformist faction aligned with the JCP, believed that compromise was possible with professors and that their ultimate opponent was the oppressive force of the Ministry of Education. Minsei was important in working against Zenkyōtō, opposing their occupations of campuses.

This chart shows the relationships between various factions within the Japanese New Left. However, it is an oversimplification of these relations, with many details not shown. (Note: This chart is based on Andrews's simplified chart. He notes that dozens of political groups are not shown, and that mergers and some connections have been omitted.) Factions colored yellow were the members of the Sanpa Zengakuren, an anti-JCP alliance. The two splinter factions of Kakukyōdō also had their own factions of Marugakudō, Kakukyōdō's Zengakuren student arm.

Kakukyōdō (Revolutionary Communist League)	Japanese Communist Party	Japan Socialist Party
Kakukyōdō (National Committee)	Minsei Dōmei	Kyosandō (Bund)	Shaseidō Kaihō-ha
Chūkaku-ha	Kakumaru-ha	Shagakudō
Fourth International Japan	Marx-Leninist-ha	Many others
Second Bund
Senki-ha	Many others
Kakumei Saha	Sekigun-ha (Red Army Faction)
Rengō Sekigun (United Red Army)	Yodogō Group	Nihon Sekigun (Japanese Red Army)

== Philosophy ==
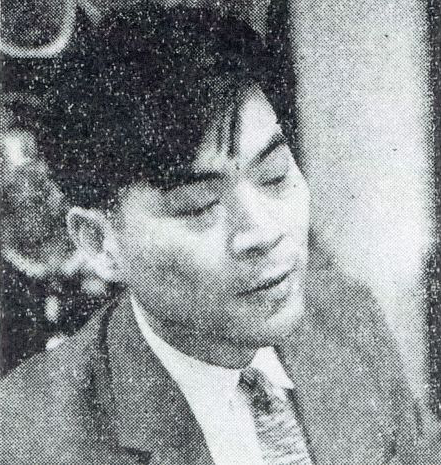
Takaaki Yoshimoto, the "prophet" of the New Left

Their interpretation of the idea of shutaisei greatly influenced the students. Once started, the protests became a way for students to oppose the progressives for abandoning shutaisei during the Anpo Protests of 1960. The students wished to have a sense of personal self-hood or agency and wanted to join with other people looking for shutaisei to affirm this through fighting. Some of the most popular books within the student population of Japan at the time were existentialist works such as Dostoevsky's The Brothers Karamazov and Camus's The Stranger.

Japanese New Left scholar William Andrews likens the students' interpretation of shutaisei to Jean-Paul Sartre's theory of good and bad faith – it was personal conviction and student agency that the students thought would bring about change, not following any party line. This led to an emphasis on self-criticism and self-negation (jikohihan) as a way of becoming more revolutionary.

When University of Tokyo students were asked what they were fighting for, most of them claimed they were fighting either for "asserting the self" or "self-transformation". The students rejected anything they deemed "reformism", such as concrete reform goals. Their goals overall were very vague; one Zenkyōtō member claimed to be fighting "for the battle itself" and some students simply wanted to join in on the fighting. The students, especially those within the Bund, interpreted shutaisei through Takaaki Yoshimoto's simplified interpretation. Their idea of shutaisei led to their demise – they wanted to have the agency to negate their own selves.

Critics of this interpretation like then-dean of the Literature Facility of the University of Tokyo, Kentaro Hayashi, who had been taken hostage by the students during the protests, denounced the students' ideas as "the hypocrisy of self-denigration" – despite all of their talk about denying "the University of Tokyo within us", the students were hypocritically keeping their privileges as University of Tokyo students. Yoshimoto himself, seen as a "prophet" by the students, was critical of them for being wrapped up in a "communal illusion".

== Legacy ==
The late-1960s protest cycle caused the Japanese left to lose public support – in the 1969 Japanese general election, the JSP lost 51 seats. The waning influence, power and public image of the left, as well as increased police scrutiny, led to the failure of the 1970 Anpo protests.

Within the psyche of the 1968 generation, the defeat of the protests generated an identity crisis. This lack of understanding towards the self was one of the main inspirations for writer Haruki Murakami – some of his books deal directly with the aftermath of the protests in the 1970s, like Hear the Wind Sing. Other famous books inspired by the protests include the 1977 Zenkyōtō novel Boku tte nani by Masahiro Mita (ja), and 69 by Ryū Murakami (further adapted into a 2004 film). The events at Yasuda Hall eventually led to the creation of a new genre of literature named Zenkyōtō bungaku (Zenkyōtō literature), which comprises books published in the 1970s and 1980s that are set during the protests. These works include intense imagery of strong emotions, disappointment, confusion, and failure. Philosopher and semiotician Roland Barthes even dedicated a section of his book Empire of Signs to the Zengakuren students.

The student protests did not spawn any reformist political movements, like the Green Party in Germany. Oguma identifies three reasons for this – the students' rejection of any concrete goals and their own moralistic goals, continuing economic growth in Japan leading to the employment of former activists within traditional Japanese society, and the rigid structure and Marxist nature of the sects. However, some militant students created their own new movements, such as the Rengo Sekigun (United Red Army) or the Nihon Sekigun (Japanese Red Army). For these students, the student protests were just a step in the right direction, and not the end of their military struggle. Sekigun and other remnant groups of the student groups that participated in the protests were responsible for such incidents as the Yodogō Hijacking Incident and the Asama-Sansō incident. The evolution of these groups from the protests is the subject of Kōji Wakamatsu's 2007 film United Red Army.

The aftermath of the protests also led to the rise of Japanese feminism. Women were constrained in their ability to protest during the movement, especially in Japanese society, where women's roles were more traditional. Importantly, female students were given an opportunity and agency for public action. The failure of female students to be treated equally during the protests led to a greater awareness among women of gender inequality on campus. This new awareness led feminist intellectual Mitsu Tanaka to write her 1970 work No More Toilets, a seminal work in the Ūman ribu movement. Tanaka criticized the infighting within the New Left groups as overly masculine and capitalistic.
