= Shinjuku riot =

Violent protest in Tokyo, 21 October 1968

- Part of the Protests of 1968
- Date: 21 October 1968
- Location: Shinjuku Station, Shinjuku, Tokyo, Japan
- Caused by: Anti-Vietnam War sentiment in Japan
- Methods: Occupation of Tokyo's busiest train station; hurling track ballast; arson

Parties
New Left sects: Chūkaku-ha; Kakumaru-ha; ML-ha; Fourth International; Kōkai-ha; Others; Non-sect student activists; Radical labor unionists; Ordinary workers	(Japan) Japanese Government; Tokyo Metropolitan Police; Riot police

Number
~20,000	~12,000

Casualties and losses
743 arrested	1,157 injured

The Shinjuku riot (Japanese: 新宿騒乱, Hepburn: Shinjuku sōran) was a violent clash between police and anti-Vietnam War protesters who occupied Shinjuku Station in Tokyo, Japan, on 21 October 1968. The incident took place in the context of mass demonstrations in observation of "International Anti-War Day". In total more than 800,000 Japanese left-wing activists, including the Beheiren anti-war coalition, labor unionists, and radical student groups also participating in the 1968–1969 Japanese university protests, carried out a variety of demonstrations and protest activities across Japan. By occupying Shinjuku Station and disrupting the normal transit of trains, a large group of protesters in Tokyo hoped to express their disapproval of the Japanese government's support for the United States-led war in Vietnam. The riot was mostly broken up by the morning of 22 October due to the invocation of the Anti-Riot Law by police, an act that was largely condoned by the press and led to greater police confidence.

== Background ==
On 8 August 1967, a freight train carrying jet fuel bound for the U.S. air bases at Tachikawa and Yokota collided with another freight train and caught fire at Shinjuku Station. This spectacular accident drew attention to the fact that Japanese trains were being used to ship war materiel to support the U.S. war in Vietnam, and made Shinjuku Station in particular a target for protests. During the summer of 1968, various groups "rehearsed" for the events in October. In June, members of Beheiren organized a sit-in of 11,000 people near Ginza. On 21 June, Zengakuren students entered Kanda, Tokyo, trying to occupy it. On 26 June, 4,000 Sanpa Zengakuren (Note: An anti-Japan Communist Party coalition within Zengakuren.) members demonstrated within Shinjuku Station. On 8 October, a group of 6–8 thousand activists occupied Shinjuku Station, trying to stop shipments of jet fuel passing through it. However, they were beaten back by police with water cannons and tear gas, something which the police used to dramatize restraint on their part to create a negative public opinion of the activists.

On 21 October ("International Anti-War Day"), the one-year anniversary of the March on the Pentagon, rallies were held across Japan by multiple groups despite rules against holding them on that day. The protesters wanted to show their disapproval of the Japanese government's support for the United States-led war in Vietnam. Fearing student violence, 66 universities suspended their activities for the day. In Tokyo, the day started with large peaceful rallies at Meiji Shrine and Hibiya Park, organized by Sōhyō, Beheiren, the Japan Socialist Party (JSP), and the Japan Communist Party (JCP), with an estimated 35–55 thousand participating throughout the city. The JCP-linked Minsei student group also organized a peaceful sit-in of 12,000 students. Of note were the protests outside the Defense Agency in Roppongi and the desecration of the grave of Prime Minister Shigeru Yoshida. Elsewhere around the nation, 6,000 students and 8,000 other activists rallied in 18 prefectures and 600 towns saw rallies from over 800,000 Sōhyō-affiliated labor unionists.

== Riot ==
In Tokyo, a large group of protesters, numbering among them 6–7 thousand members of Chūkaku-ha, ML-ha, Fourth International, Kōkai-ha, Kakumaru-ha, and other radical New Left student groups, joined by around 12–14 thousand ordinary students and local workers, tried to turn the area of Shinjuku surrounding Shinjuku Station into a "liberated quarter" controlled by the protestors. Starting at 5 p.m., the station itself was occupied and the west entrance was set on fire. Protesters occupied the train tracks, disrupting train travel, and hurled stones from the track ballast at police. A large crowd of 60,000 turned out to witness the fighting between police and the 20,000 protesters within the station itself. An initial detachment of 3,200 riot police dispatched to Shinjuku Station was completely overwhelmed. Some even reported having their sidearms stolen by rioters. Sociologist Eiji Oguma noted that most of the violence and destruction actually came from the actions of regular workers, while the radical student activists refrained from excessive violence. To break up the riot, the police invoked the Anti-Riot Law (Article 106 of the Japanese Criminal Code) against the rioters, the first time it had been used since 1952. Invoking the Anti-Riot Law allowed as many as 25,000 police officers to be mobilized throughout the city, of which half were deployed to the Shinjuku Station area, and the station was finally cleared in the early hours of 22 October.

== Aftermath ==
As a result of the riot, department stores around Shinjuku Station were forced to close, and 700 trains were cancelled, affecting 350,000 passengers and resulting in US$18 million in financial losses. 1,157 police were injured and 743 rioters were arrested, with more than a thousand others being arrested around Japan. The police's use of the Anti-Riot Law was largely condoned by the press—even Asahi Shimbun, known for its left-leaning sympathies, described the rioters as "a feckless mob". Although many locals and "ordinary citizens" publicly urged on the rioters on the day itself, public opinion quickly turned against the activists and in favor of the police. This reinforced the legitimacy of police using force to quell protests, increasing their confidence in using harsher measures against activists, including as mass arrests and assaults on occupied campuses, such as at Sophia University, which fell to the police in December 1968.

== See also ==
- 10.21 International Anti-War Day Struggle
