= New Left in Japan =

Diverse array of 1960s Japanese leftist movements

The New Left (新左翼, shin-sayoku) in Japan refers to a diverse array of 1960s Japanese leftist movements that, like their counterparts in the Western New Left, adopted a more radical political stance compared to the established "Old Left," which in the case of Japan was emblematized by the Japanese Communist Party and Japan Socialist Party. After emerging in the lead-up to the 1960 Anpo protests against the U.S.-Japan Security Treaty, the movement grew and diversified before climaxing with the Zenkyōtō movement which barricaded dozens of Japanese universities in 1968–1969. Much like its counterparts in the West, in the 1970s, the Japanese New Left became known for violent internal splits and terrorism, which caused the movement's influence to wane.

== Origins ==
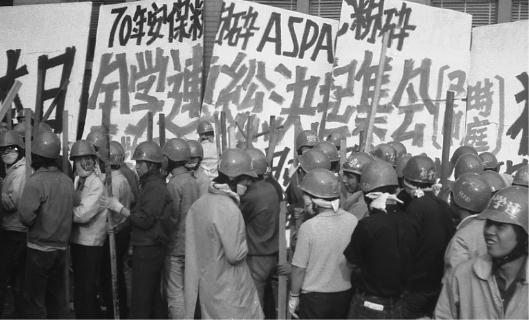
Zengakuren protestors in Tokyo, 1968

From 1948, Japan had a powerful, centralized, nationwide student movement thanks to the establishment of Zengakuren (the "All-Japan Federation of Student Self-Government Associations") that same year. However at least initially, Zengakuren remained firmly under the sway of the Japanese Communist Party (JCP), having been founded with JCP urging and assistance. However, in 1950, in response to criticism by Joseph Stalin, the JCP embarked on a course of immediate, violent communist revolution in Japan, ordering student activists into the mountains to form "mountain village guerrilla squads." This policy proved to be an unmitigated disaster for the JCP, which completely reversed itself by 1955, disavowing the violence and in part blaming it on the student activists themselves. This volte-face enraged many student activists, who began to increasingly question whether they should continue to follow the orders of the JCP.

Another blow came in February 1956, when Nikita Khrushchev secretly denounced Stalinism in his speech "On the Cult of Personality and Its Consequences." This speech went unreported in official Party organs, so the Stalinist Japanese Communist Party did not offer any reaction. But copies of this "Secret Speech" circulated around the world and had a great impact on Communist-affiliated youth and student organizations. Then in the fall, the Soviets brutally suppressed the Hungarian Revolution, sowing further confusion and disillusionment among the worldwide Communist movement.

These developments led directly to the formation in 1957 of the Trotskyist Revolutionary Communist League (abbreviated Kakukyōdō in Japanese) by dissident student activists breaking free from the JCP, under the guidance of the charismatic half-blind philosopher Kan'ichi Kuroda. Then in December 1958, another group of Trotskyist dissidents split from the Communist Party to form the Communist League, better known by its German-inspired nickname "The Bund" (Bunto). In later years, these two groups would retroactively be viewed as early precursors to the New Left in Japan.

== Seizing control of Zengakuren ==
Over the course of 1959, the Bund and Kakukyōdō worked in concert to seize control of the Zengakuren-member student associations (jichikai) at colleges and universities across Japan, in some cases, Bund leaders later confessed, by rigging leadership elections.

By November, 1959, the Bund and the Kakukyōdō-affiliated students had gained control of approximately 60% of the Zengakuren jichikai, becoming the "mainstream faction" (shūryū-ha) and making them strong enough to elect charismatic Bund member Kentarō Karōji chairman of the entire Zengakuren organization and redirect the federation's protests toward more confrontational "direct action," over and against the wishes of the JCP and the JCP-linked "anti-mainstream faction" (han-shūryū-ha) of the Zengakuren.

== The 1960 Anpo protests ==
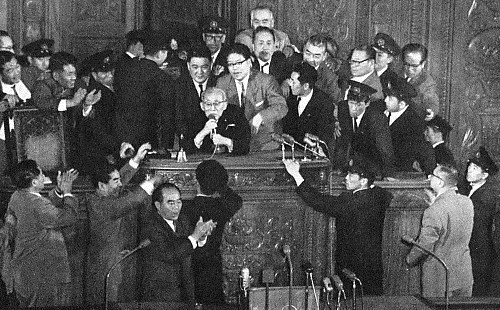
A scrum at the rostrum of the National Diet, as Japan Socialist Party Diet members attempt to prevent Speaker of the Lower House Ichirō Kiyose from calling for a vote on extending the Diet Session, while being restrained by police officers, May 19, 1960.

On November 27, 1959, as part of the Anpo protests against proposed revision the U.S.-Japan Security Treaty, Bund and Kakukyōdō members led Zengakuren students to smash their way into Japan's National Diet compound, where they proceeded to dance and sing protest songs for several hours before disbanding peacefully. This "violent" action drew condemnation from the JCP and other members of the nationwide coalition organized to protest the Security Treaty.

The radical student activists were undeterred however, and in January 1960, organized a sit-in in Tokyo's Haneda Airport to try to physically block Prime Minister Nobusuke Kishi from traveling to Washington, D.C. to sign the new treaty.

Finally on June 15, 1960, at the climax of the protests, the radical student activists once again smashing their way into the Diet compound to show their anger at the Treaty. This time, however, they were met by hundreds of police armed with truncheons, who attempted to force them back out, precipitating a bloody struggle that lasted for many hours, long into the night. It was during this violent confrontation that female Bund activist Michiko Kanba was killed, shocking the nation and helping to precipitate the fall of the Kishi cabinet.

However, despite helping bring about the resignation of Kishi and the cancellation of a planned visit to Japan by U.S. President Dwight D. Eisenhower, the Anpo protests failed to stop the revision of the Security Treaty, which took effect on June 19, 1960, bringing the protest movement to an end and sowing dissention and disillusionment among the ranks of the radical student activists.

== Post-Anpo schisms ==
The Anpo protests had a splintering effect on the student movement, as heated disagreements over who was to blame for the failure to stop the treaty led to infighting and recriminations. The first open splits within Zengakuren occurred in the immediate aftermath, and thereafter the previously unified nationwide student federation rapidly disintegrated into numerous warring factions, paving the way for the rise of the radical New Left "sects" (sekuto) that would play a leading role in the 1968–1969 Japanese university protests. Above all, the passive role played by the JCP and other "Old Left" groups involved in the protest movement convinced a younger generation of activists to break free from what they saw as the stifling hierarchy and soul-crushing conformity of Old Left organizations to establish new forms of radical activism.

Immediately following the defeat of the protests, the Bund split into three warring factions and then dissolved. In 1961, the JCP's own "Structural Reform" faction, led by Shōjirō Kasuga, was expelled from the party, and the Zengakuren activists loyal to Kasuga formed the "Structural Reform" faction (Kо̄kai-ha) of Zengakuren. In 1963 Kakukyōdō split into the Revolutionary Communist League, National Committee, better known by its Japanese abbreviation "Chūkaku-ha," and the Japan Revolutionary Communist League (Revolutionary Marxist Faction), known best by its Japanese abbreviation "Kakumaru-ha." In 1965, the Socialist Party's Youth Alliance developed a "Liberation Faction" (Kaihо̄-Ha) that rejected Trotskyism and advocated for Luxemburgism. In 1966, the Kansai Bund merged with some other splinter groups to re-form the Communist League as a nationwide organization, which came to be nicknamed the "Second Bund" (Dainiji Bunto).

Among many others, these five "sects" and a dizzying array of additional factions and sub-factions descended into a "season of schisms" (分裂の季節, bunretsu no kisetsu) characterized by internecine violence known as uchi-geba (literally, "internal violence," borrowing "geba" from the German gewalt), as student radicals armed themselves with colorful helmets and wooden staves known as gebabō or "volence sticks" and battled each other at least as much as they battled police.

== The rise of Beheiren and Zenkyо̄tо̄ ==
By the second half of the 1960s, many left-leaning activists, galvanized by Japan's support of America's war in Vietnam but repulsed by the endless ideological hair-splitting and internecine violence of the New Left sects, sought to establish new types of movements that would be free of hierarchy and open to all, regardless of ideological orientation. In 1965, a group of intellectuals associated with philosopher Shunsuke Tsurumi's "Science of Thought" study group established the "Citizen's League for Peace in Vietnam," abbreviated Beheiren in Japanese, to allow ordinary citizens a space to protest against the Vietnam war without becoming involved in arcane doctrinal disputes.

Then in 1967, university students, inspired by the writings of activists such as Michiko Kanba, Mitsuko Tokoro and others, began establishing "All-Campus Joint Struggle Committees," abbreviated Zenkyо̄tо̄ in Japanese, that any student or faculty member could join, regardless of ideological or party affiliation, for the purposes of carrying out joint struggles against university administrations and the Vietnam War.

== 1968–1969 university protests ==
In 1968 and 1969, student protests forced the closure of dozens of university campuses nationwide. Known as the daigaku funsō (大学紛争, lit. 'university troubles") or daigaku tōsō (大学闘争, "university struggles"), the protests were part of a worldwide protest cycle in 1968. Working in combination with the New Left Zengakuren "sects," Zenkyо̄tо̄ activists barricaded university campuses, occupied university buildings, halted classes, harassed administrators and professors, and made a variety demands, from concrete proposals for improving campus life to more abstract demands relating to ending the war in Vietnam and overthrowing the Japanese economic and political system. Activists regularly battled against police and each other on campus grounds, donning distinctive colored helmets so that they could recognize fellow members. In late 1968, at the zenith of the movement, tens of thousands of activists occupied Shinjuku Station in what became known as the Shinjuku riot. All told, some 165 university campuses witnessed significant protest activity in 1968 and 1969, and around 70 campuses were barricaded against police intrusion, with additional protests taking place at a large number of high schools.

As part of an International Phenomenon in the 68s (see May 68, New Communist movement), Young Japanese New Left activists of 1968-1969 drew ideological inspiration from the works of Marxist theorists like Mao Zedong and heavily influenced by the Cultural Revolution taking place in their neighbor China. However, some other group of New Left activist also drew ideological inspiration from French existentialist philosophers like Jean-Paul Sartre and Albert Camus, and the homegrown philosophy of the Japanese poet and critic Takaaki Yoshimoto. Yoshimoto's interpretation of "autonomy" (jiritsusei) and "subjectivity" (shutaisei) were based on his critique of the progressive liberal interpretations of these ideas by other Japanese intellectuals such as Masao Maruyama, whom he denounced as hypocritical. The students' devotion to shutaisei in particular would lead ultimately to the disintegration of their movement, as they focused increasingly on "self-negation" (jiko hitei) and "self-criticism" (hansei). Meanwhile, as the violence on campuses spiraled out of control, leading to university closures and the cancellation of entrance examinations, public opinion turned against the student activists. In 1969, the passage of the Act on Temporary Measures concerning University Management gave police the legal basis to smash through the barricades, enter campuses, and restore order, dealing a harsh blow to the New Left movement.

== 1970s and beyond ==
A second major blow to the New Left movements in Japan was the failure of the 1970 Anpo protests to secure an abrogation of the US-Japan Security Treaty. Throughout the decade of the 1960s, New Left activists had looked forward to the end of the revised treaty's initial 10-year term in 1970 as an opportunity to try to persuade the Japanese government to abrogate the treaty. In 1970, following the collapse of the 1968-1969 university protests, a number of New Left sects and the anti-Vietnam War organization Beheiren held a series of protest marches against the Security Treaty. However, prime minister Eisaku Satō opted to ignore the protests completely and allow the treaty to automatically renew.

Together the twin defeats of the campus struggles in 1969 and the Anpo protests in 1970 led to a renewed round of recriminations and schisms, as New Left groups further split into dozens of warring factions amidst even more violent internal conflict. From 1969 to 2003, from 1 to 4 people died every year as the result of internal conflict between New Left groups. With more moderate activists increasingly dropping out of the movement, control of the New Left sects was increasingly left in the hands of the most extreme radicals, some of whom ultimately resorted to terrorism.

On March 31, 1970, nine members of the Second Bund's Red Army Faction hijacked Japan Air Lines Flight 351 and forced it to fly to North Korea, which the hijackers believed to be a Socialist paradise. Other members of the group carried out a string of high-profile bank robberies in 1971. However, a schism arose within the group over how best to continue their armed struggle. Those that wanted to relocate overseas became the Japanese Red Army, led by Fusako Shigenobu, while those who wished to continue the revolution at home in Japan joined forces with the Kanagawa prefectural branch of the Revolutionary Left Faction to form the United Red Army, led by Tsuneo Mori and Hiroko Nagata. The Japanese Red Army decamped to the Middle East and promptly embarked on a campaign of international terrorism that lasted well into the 1980s, beginning with the Lod Airport massacre in 1972. Meanwhile, the United Red Army retreated into the mountains north of Tokyo where they murdered twelve of their own members in self-criticism sessions before remaining members engaged in a dramatic hostage standoff with police broadcast live on national television in the 1972 Asama Mountain Lodge Incident.

Together the Asama Mountain Lodge Incident and the Lod Airport Massacre have often been portrayed as an end point of Japan's New Left movement, as these extreme actions shocked the Japanese people and led to mass desertions from the remaining sects. However, the New Left sects did not entirely disappear after 1972. For example, remnants of Chūkaku-ha and Kakumaru-ha waged a violent war against each other in the 1970s, resulting in several deaths per year, and New Left sects continued to carry out the Sanrizuka Struggle against the expansion of Narita International Airport well into the 1980s, with vestigial remnants of some sects such as Chūkaku-ha continuing to exist to the present day.
