= Kakurōkyō =

Leftist group in Japan

Kakurōkyō (革労協, Revolutionary Workers' Council) is a leftist group in Japan. It was formed around 1980 and was involved with struggles related to Narita Airport, as there was long-running conflict between the government of Japan and an alliance of leftist activists who were opposed to the airport for ideological reasons with local farmers who did not wish their land to be appropriated.

== Etymology ==
Its full name is 革命的労働者協会 (kakumeiteki rōdosha kyokai).

== History ==
In June 1999, Kakurōkyō split into two factions.

Members of the group are suspected of firing rockets at Narita airport in February 1998. In February 2000, a member of the group was stabbed to death at JR Manazuru Station in Kanagawa prefecture. The three suspects were believed to also be members of the group.

Another member was murdered in front of JR Uguisudani Station in Tokyo on August 31, 2000, making a total of five activists murdered. The deaths continued until 2002, with eight members eventually being murdered.

In 2003 and 2004, around the time of the US invasion of Iraq, the group claimed responsibility for mortar attacks on Yokota Air Base, the Defense Agency in Tokyo and Naval Air Facility Atsugi in Kanagawa prefecture. Raids were made in response to the mortar attacks in 2010.

In 2013, the group was believed to have been responsible for another attack on Yokota Air Base.

In September 2015, three men were arrested for assaulting riot police during a protest against the Legislation for Peace and Security in front of the National Diet building in Tokyo. One of them was reported to be a Kakurōkyō member.

In 2019, the arrest of Toyotona Numata was made, who was the suspect involved in conducting mortar attacks on Camp Zama and Yokota Air Base.

== See also ==
- Japan Socialist Youth League
- Japan Socialist Youth League, Liberation Faction
