= Japan Socialist Youth League, Liberation Faction =

Japanese Marxist student organization

Japan Socialist Youth League, Liberation Faction 日本社会主義青年同盟解放派 Nihon Shakaishugi Seinen Dōmei Kaihō-ha
- Abbreviation: Kaihō-ha
- Founded: 1965
- Dissolved: 1981 (internal schism)
- Preceded by: Japan Socialist Youth League (internal schism)
- Succeeded by: Revolutionary Workers' Association; Liberation Faction National Council
- Ideology: Communism; Marxism; Luxemburgism
- Political position: Far-left
- Colors: Blue

The Japan Socialist Youth League, Liberation Faction (日本社会主義青年同盟解放派, Nihon Shakaishugi Seinen Dōmei Kaihō Ha), usually abbreviated Kaihō-ha ("Liberation Faction"), was a Japanese radical Marxist group active in the 1960s and 1970s as part of the Japanese New Left. Kaihō-ha had a young workers wing and a student wing. Their student wing was called the "Anti-Imperialist Student Council" (反帝学生評議会, Hantei Gakusei Hyōgikai). They wore blue helmets when engaging with hand-to-hand combat with other radical groups or the police.

Kaihō-ha played a major role in several of the protest movements of the era, including the 1968-69 Japanese university protests and the Sanrizuka Struggle against the construction of Narita Airport.

== History ==
In 1960, the Zengakuren nationwide student federation dissolved in a series of schisms arising from contentious debates over who was to blame for the failure of the massive Anpo protests to prevent passage of the U.S.-Japan Security Treaty. Hoping to capture a slice of the splintering student movement in Japan, the Japan Socialist Party (JSP) established a new party youth wing, the "Japan Socialist Youth League" (日本社会主義青年同盟, Nihon Shakaisugi Seinen Dōmei), usually abbreviated Shaseidō) to institutionalize the piece of Zengakuren controlled by JSP-affiliated student activists. Thereafter, the "Shaseidō Zengakuren" was one of several Zengakurens competing for the title of the "true" Zengakuren.

In 1964, however, Shaseidō itself experienced a schism over the JSP's party platform of "Structural Reform," which some of the radical youth activists felt was too gradualist. Those activists who favored immediate push for socialist revolution broke away to form the Shaseidō "Liberation Faction" in 1965, under the slogan "immediate worldwide proletarian revolution." This was the origin of Kaihō-ha.

== Activities ==
In 1966, Kaihō-ha joined with two other radical student sects, Chūkaku-Ha and the Second Bund, to form the "Three-Faction Zengakuren" (Sanpa Zengakuren) in order to pursue immediate revolution through violent direct action.

On October 17, 1967, Kaihō-ha participated in an effort by the Sanpa Zengakuren to physically prevent Prime Minister Eisaku Satō from traveling to the United States to meet with U.S. president Lyndon Johnson, leading to a violent struggle with police in which one student activist was killed.

In 1968 and 1969, Kaihō-ha participated in the 1968-69 Japanese university protests on various campuses around Japan.

Beginning in 1968 and lasting into the 1980s, Kaihō-ha participated the violent Sanrizuka Struggle against the construction of Narita Airport.

In 1971, the JSP severed all ties with Kaihō-ha and evicted its members from the party.

Kaihō-ha had an intense, long-running conflict with rival New Left group Kakumaru-ha. By 1980, Kaihō-ha had killed around 20 members of Kakumaru-ha.

== Schism ==
In 1981, Kaihō-ha splintered into the "Revolutionary Workers' Association" (革命的労働者協会, Kakumei-teki rōdō-sha kyōkai) and the Liberation Faction National Council (解放派全国協議会, Kaihō-ha zenkoku kyōgi-kai).
