= Minsei =

Minsei may refer to:

== Politics ==
- The Democratic Youth League of Japan or Minsei Dōmei, the youth wing of the Japanese Communist Party
- The Constitutional Democratic Party (Japan) or Rikken Minseitō, a liberal political party in the pre-war Empire of Japan
- The Good Governance Party or Minseitō, a centrist political party founded in 1998 and merged into the Democratic Party of Japan

== Firms ==
- UD Trucks, a manufacturer of vehicles formerly known as Minsei Diesel Industries
- Toyota Boshoku, an automotive component manufacturer formerly known as Minsei Spinning Co.
