= Zenkyōtō =

Japanese student organizations active in the 1960s

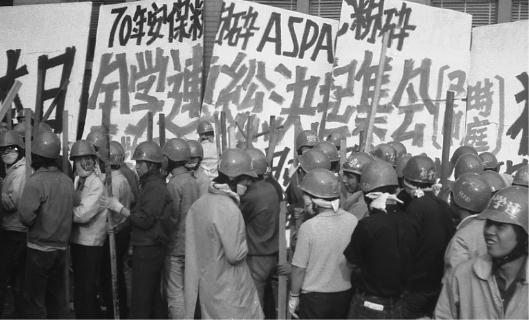
A Japanese student protest in June 1968

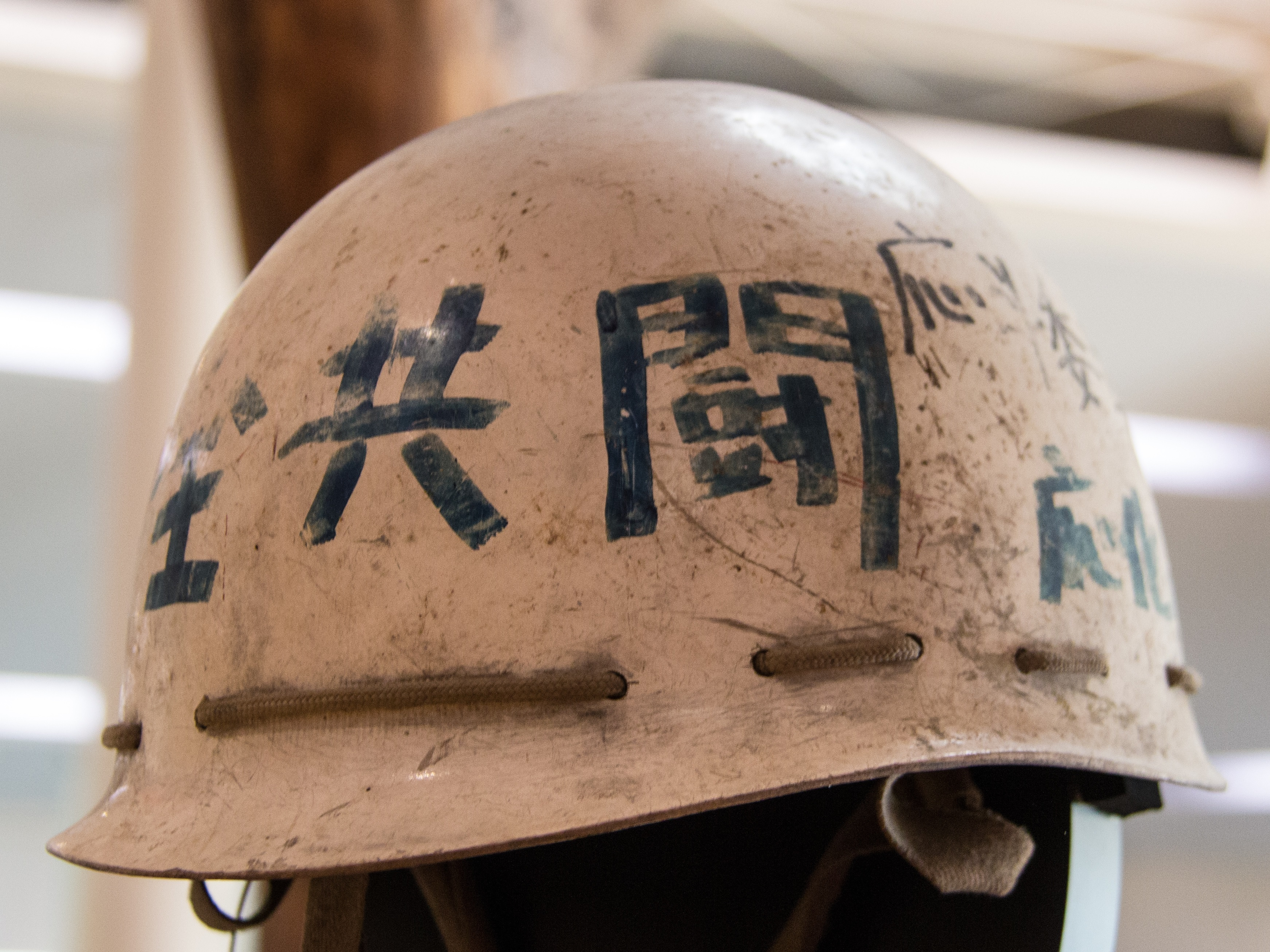
A Zenkyōtō helmet

The All-Campus Joint Struggle Committees (Japanese: 全学共闘会議, Hepburn: Zengaku kyōtō kaigi), commonly known as the Zenkyōtō (全共闘), were Japanese student organizations consisting of anti-government, anti-Japanese Communist Party leftist and non-sectarian radicals. The Zenkyōtō were formed to organize students during the 1968–69 Japanese university protests. Unlike other student movement organizations, graduate students and young teachers were allowed to participate. Active in the late 1960s, Zenkyōtō was the driving force behind clashes between Japanese students and the police. Zenkyōtō groups were driven by alienation and a reaction to "American imperialism", Japanese "Monopoly Capitalism", and "Russian Stalinism". However, many members of the movement were non-political (known as nonpori in Japanese), and were focused more on more practical and local problems. Much of the movement centered around nihilism, humanism and existentialism, which served as inspirations for revolution.

Since individual Zenkyōtō groups were formed independently at each university, their timing, purpose, organization and policies were unique. Among Zenkyōtō groups at universities, Nihon University and the University of Tokyo are the most well-known. The media reported that University of Tokyo Zenkyōtō members tried to "dismantle colleges". In their protests, University of Tokyo Zenkyōtō members battled police with hurled stones and wooden staves nicknamed "violence sticks" (gebaruto bō). Some say that the University of Tokyo faction was more of a mass movement than an organized movement in which concrete ideas and policies were set forth. Zenkyōtō policies could be more diverse depending on different universities and individuals.

Zenkyōtō led a delegation of seven undergraduates to pressure University authorities to accept their demands during the period of conflict at the University of Tokyo. With the moving of the Ministry of Education after entrance examinations were cancelled, riot police were introduced to suppress a mass Zenkyōtō protest. Athletic groups and people of different ethnicities participated in combat at Nihon University.

== Origins ==
In 1948, the Zengakuren was founded as a student organization close to the Japan Communist Party (JCP). In 1960, the students of Zengakuren broke with the JCP over methodological differences during the Anpo protests. Although some Zengakuren members eventually reconciled with the JCP, many were turned against it, leading to conflict between Zengakuren and the JCP. Zengakuren itself was broken into multiple factions, who participated in factional infighting within the organization. This increasing conflict between different groups in the left began a cycle of violence that would last into the late-1960s. In 1962, student unrest at Waseda University over the building of a new student hall led to the founding of the Waseda Zenkyōtō, a precursor group to other Zenkyōtō. Chaired by Akihiko Oguchi, a member of the Shaseido Kaiho-ha, the Waseda Zenkyōtō turned eventually from the problem of the student hall to that of a planned rise in tuition fees. The Zenkyōtō students took action, leading to fighting within the university that subsided in June 1966.

== Major conflicts ==
=== Nihon University ===
In May 1968, a demonstration was held in Nihon University, dubbed the 200 Meter Demonstration as a reaction to the secrecy of university authorities on the expenditure of 3400 million yen. On May 27, the Nihon University Zenkyōtō was formed by Akehiro Akita, who chaired the organization. The Zenkyōtō consisted of anti-Communist and non-sectarian radicals. In response to student demands, university authorities held a conference at the Ryogoku Auditorium on September 30 to negotiate between students and authorities. The rally was attended by as many as 35,000 students. After 12 hours of negotiations, the authorities accepted the demands of the students, leading to the resignation of all University directors involved. However, following the negotiations, Japanese Prime Minister Eisaku Sato declared that "establishing relations with popular gangs deviate from common sense", and the authorities withdrew their promises to the students. Students with associations to sports began to riot in Ryogoku Auditorium, and riot police was brought in. After the situation calmed down, Nihon University resumed classes in a temporary school complex in Shiraitodai, Fuchū, with 10 buildings surrounded by vacant fields and barbed wire. Staff were stationed at the entrance of the premises, and students were required to show student IDs. This complex was popularly called "Nihon Auschwitz", in reference to Auschwitz concentration camp.

=== University of Tokyo ===
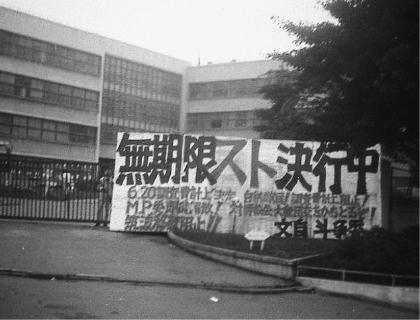
A sign at Tsukuba University, August 1968

In January 1968, a dispute over the status of graduate students in the University of Tokyo Faculty of Medicine over the new Medical Doctors' Law which restricted employment opportunities and a judgement on a militant student made by the board led to mass protests in the University of Tokyo. A Zenkyōtō sprung up at the conflict in the university, and Zenkyōtō students occupied and fought in Yasuda Auditorium, which they had occupied in July, against riot police. In January 1969, 8500 riot police were called to Yasuda Auditorium to break up the protest.

=== Creation of the National Federation ===
With different action committees nationwide participating in solidarity with the Nihon Zenkyōtō, the committees were federated into a nationwide Zenkyōtō, escaping the supervision of the Zengakuren, who often sided with university authorities. Committees were organized by levels (students, staff, researchers, etc.) and by departments (humanities, medicine, literature, etc.). Each committee had a degree of autonomy. Committee members participated in committee debates, and decisions were voted on by a show of hands. Attempts by universities to arrest leaders of Zenkyōtō were fruitless. The National Federation of Zenkyōtō was set up at Hibiya Park in September 1969. However, Yoshitaka Yamamoto, leader of the University of Tokyo Zenkyōtō, who chaired the rally at Hibiya Park, was arrested.

== Spread ==
From 1968 to 1969, Zenkyōtō expanded alongside conflicts in the University of Tokyo, "spreading like a wildfire" to universities nationwide.

Zenkyōtō initially only dealt with issues specific to each university (tuition fees, etc.) beyond the jurisdiction of university student councils. Later, after experiencing hard responses from university authorities as well as government intervention with riot police, Zenkyōtō changed to deal with the change of the "philosophy of universities as a whole, as well as change of academic subjects and reviewing the way universities, students and researchers work." Zenkyōtō believed that modern universities were "factories of education" embedded in imperialist forms of management, with faculty councils as "terminal institutions of power" responsible for their management. They claimed that "university autonomy" was no more than an illusion, and that dismantling such an administration would be an issue. They believed that universities should be dismantled by violence, such as university-wide blockades. According to Zenkyōtō, the ideological question of "self-denial" should be advanced to deny statuses as students or researchers. Students began to use wooden staves against both the riot police and each other, with students taking their nihilism and anger not only onto university power structures, but themselves.

== Fall ==
Zenkyōtō began to lose its momentum and the support of the students as university struggles were stuck in stalemates, with seemingly impossible demands, all the while universities were really in danger of being dissolved. Oda Makoto of the Beheiren (Citizen's Alliance for Peace in Vietnam) group claimed that he would start his own movement if Zenkyōtō could not destroy the University of Tokyo.

== Ideology ==
The Zenkyōtō students were extremely nihilistic and rejected hierarchy, seeing the university system as being based primarily on oppression. Their motto was "smash the university" (daigaku funsai) – they saw themselves as diametrically opposed to the university system, and would only stop if the universities were destroyed. Zenkyōtō further deemed everyone complicit in the university system as "victimizers" (kagaisha). The Zenkyōtō found their ideological basis in Takaaki Yoshimoto – he was so popular among the New Left that he was referred to as a "prophet". During the 1968–69 protests, the Zenkyōtō students harassed Yoshimoto's ideological enemy, Masao Maruyama, to the point where he eventually retired in 1971. The slogans of "disassembly of the university" and "self-denial" emerged in the student movement of the University of Tokyo. The conflict at the university transcended the boundaries of university issues and became a form of "conflict between students and state power". This was no longer a struggle that could be ended by a compromise at each university. Tomofusa Kure, a student involved in the conflict, said that "Self-negation is self-affirmation. To discover it is self-negation. Self-negation is not intended to be the aim – Rather, it emerges as a result of self-affirmation." This "self-negation" was a form of "negation of the university which produces men to serve capital as if in a factory, and also negation of the existence of students whose only future was to be cogs in the power machine thus created."

== See also ==
- Japanese Red Army
- Anarchism in Japan
