= Japan Socialist Youth League =

Japanese socialist student organization

Japan Socialist Youth League 日本社会主義青年同盟 Nihon Shakaishugi Seinen Dōmei
- Abbreviation: Shaseidō
- Founded: October 15, 1960
- Preceded by: Japan Socialist Party Youth Division
- Ideology: Rōnōha Marxism; Democratic socialism
- Political position: Left-wing
- International affiliation: WFDY

Website
- https://lsyjp.com/

The Japan Socialist Youth League (日本社会主義青年同盟, Nihon Shakaishugi Seinen Dōmei), usually abbreviated Shaseidō (社青同), was a Japanese socialist youth organization originally affiliated with the Japan Socialist Party and active in the 1960s, 1970s, and 1980s as part of the Japanese New Left. Shaseidō had both a student wing and a young workers wing.

== History ==
In 1960, the Zengakuren nationwide student federation dissolved in a series of schisms arising from contentious debates over who was to blame for the failure of the massive Anpo protests to prevent passage of the U.S.-Japan Security Treaty. Hoping to capture a slice of the splintering student movement in Japan, the Japan Socialist Party (JSP) established a new party youth wing, called the Japan Socialist Youth League, in order to institutionalize the piece of Zengakuren controlled by JSP-affiliated student activists. Thereafter, the "Shaseidō Zengakuren" was one of several Zengakurens competing for the title of the "true" Zengakuren.

Originally, Shaseidо̄ was dominated by the "Structural Reform" faction of the JSP, which proposed gradually reforming Japanese society along more socialist lines in a peaceful, democratic manner. At Shaseidо̄'s 4th Congress in 1964, however, the Structural Reform Faction was ousted from power and replaced by the "Socialist Association" faction, focused around members in the JSP's Socialist Association think tank, and which advocated working toward a thoroughgoing socialist revolution in Japan. Nevertheless, some of the most radical socialist youth activists felt even this was too gradualist. Those activists who favored pushing for an immediate, possibly violent socialist revolution broke away to form the "Liberation Faction" in 1965, under the slogan "immediate worldwide proletarian revolution."

In 1967, the Socialist Association experienced a schism of its own, leading to further schisms in Shaseidō. At the 9th Shaseidō Congress in 1969, open confrontation appeared between the Sakisaka faction (followers of Socialist Association ideologue Itsurō Sakisaka comprising the mainstream of the Association faction), the Ota faction (followers of former Sōhyō chairman Kaoru Ōta), and the "Anti-War" faction (militants favoring immediate, violent revolution). Over the next few years, all of the factions and various subfactions were either expelled or left Shaseidō of their own accord, such that by the 10th Congress in 1971, the Sakisaka faction was left in almost complete control of the organization. Among the factions expelled was the highly militant young workers wing, known as the Revolutionary Workers Association (Kakumeiteki Rōdōsha Kyōkai or Kakurōkyō), which remains active today.

After 1971, the remainder of Shaseidō remained fairly unified and continued to function as the youth wing of the JSP until the party's own dissolution in 1996, and some successor organizations are still active today.
