= Mountain Village Operation Units =

Japanese communist paramilitary units

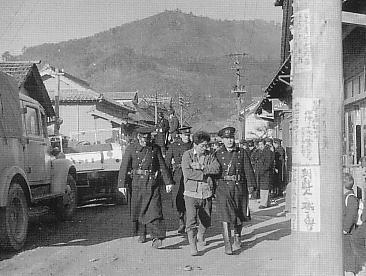
Member of the Japanese Communist Party arrested by the police, 1951

The Mountain Village Operation Units (山村工作隊, Sanson Kōsakutai) were underground paramilitary units organized by the Japanese Communist Party (JCP) in the early 1950s. The purpose of the units was carrying out guerrilla operations against the Japanese government and the Allied Occupation of Japan inspired by Mao Zedong's strategy of forming a base of operations in rural villages to launch a nationwide communist revolution. These operations achieved no successes and proved a disaster for the JCP's political prospects going forward.

== Background and history ==
In early post-war Japan, the newly legalized Japanese Communist Party (JCP), guided by its charismatic leader Sanzō Nosaka, pursued a strategy of fostering what Nosaka called a "lovable" (aisareru) public image, seeking to take advantage of the seemingly pro-labor, American-led Occupation of Japan to bring about a peaceful socialist revolution in Japan. This strategy was highly successful at first, attracting a large following for the party within the student and labor movements, and among intellectuals. In the 1946 general election, Nosaka and four other members of the JCP were elected to the Diet, and the party received 4% of the popular vote. In the 1949 general election, the JCP had its best showing ever, receiving nearly 10% of the popular vote. However, with the fall of China to the communists in 1949 and increasing Cold War tensions around the world, the United States initiated the so-called "Reverse Course" in Japan. The Occupation authorities shifted away from demilitarization and democratization to remilitarization, suppressing leftists, and strengthening Japan's conservative elements in support of American Cold War objectives in Asia. At the Occupation's urging, the Japanese state and private corporations carried out a sweeping "Red Purge," firing tens of thousands of communists and suspected communists from their jobs in both government and the private sector. In 1949, China's Liu Shaoqi met with Soviet leader Joseph Stalin. At the meeting, Stalin urged China to support the struggle of JCP. Liu was unenthusiastic about the idea. However, after Mao Zedong visited the Soviet Union in January 1950 for the renegotiation of the Sino-Soviet Treaty of Friendship and Alliance, China was pressured to issue a statement criticizing JCP's change to a peaceful party. Meanwhile, on January 6, 1950, the Soviet-led Cominform published a tract personally written by Joseph Stalin, harshly criticizing the JCP's peaceful line as "opportunism" and "glorifying American imperialism" and demanding that the JCP take steps to pursue immediate violent revolution in Japan. The pressure from Soviet Union caused an internal struggle between JCP members.

On June 6, 1950, Douglas MacArthur, the Supreme Commander for the Allied Powers, ordered a purge of 24 members of JCP's Central Committee and forbade them from engaging in any political activities. Competition between JCP factions to win Cominform approval in the wake of this devastating "Cominform Criticism" would ultimately lead, by the summer of 1951, to a complete reversal in JCP tactics from the peaceful pursuit of revolution within democratic institutions to an embrace of immediate and violent revolution along Maoist lines. General Secretary Kyuichi Tokuda and his allies saw this situation as a perfect opportunity to take personal control of the party through an informal process that did not involve convening the Central Committee or the Politburo which he named the Interim Central Directorate. Tokuda excluded seven Central Committee members, including Kenji Miyamoto, who held dissenting points of view, and went underground. As a result of the Red Purge, Tokuda and his group went into exile in the People's Republic of China and on February 23, 1951, at the JCP's 4th Party Congress, they decided on a policy of armed resistance against the American occupation of Japan, issuing orders to form a "liberated zone" in the rural villages across the country, particularly among peasants in mountain villages, just like the tactics successfully employed by the Chinese Communist Party in the Second Sino-Japanese War. At the 5th Party Congress of October 16, a new manifesto-like document was adopted called Present Demands of the Japanese Communist Party which included clauses on waging guerrilla war in the villages. Clandestine organizations were created including the Chukaku Jieitai, for weapons' procurement and training, the Dokuritsu Yugekitai, for offensive guerrilla operations, and the Mountain Village Operation Units.

== Outcome and backlash ==
The armed struggle was activated throughout Japan, including terrorist attacks on police officers, arson against police boxes, and bombings of trains. The JCP ordered its most expendable members, including Zengakuren student activists, artists and other bohemians, and Zainichi Koreans, to go up into the mountains to organize the Mountain Village Operation Units.

In reality, however, the social and economic conditions in early 1950s Japan differed greatly from those found in 1940s China, and the Mountain Village Operation Units had been given an impossible task. Sent into the mountains without training, food, supplies, or weapons, they were supposed to build a revolutionary army in accordance with Maoist doctrine by radicalizing the "peasant farmers." However, Japan's highly educated, relatively wealthy land-owning farmers were generally loyal to Japan's conservative parties and had no interest in communist revolution. As a result, many of the JCP cadres sent to form the Mountain Village Operations Units ran out of food and found no place to stay, and thus soon gave up and straggled back to the cities. Instead, it was the urban guerilla squads that wreaked the most havoc, carrying out the Bloody May Day protests on May 1, 1952 and a variety of other attacks on Japanese police and U.S. military installations.

The backlash to the JCP's new militant line was swift and severe. In July 1952, the Subversive Activities Prevention Law was enacted and enforced to clamp down on the JCP's attacks, with militants being rounded up, tried, and sentenced to lengthy prison terms. In the 1952 general election, Japanese voters vented their ire at the JCP's violent actions by stripping the party of every single one of its 35 Diet seats, a blow from which it would take the party two decades to recover. Stunned by the backlash, the JCP gradually began to pull back from its militant line, a process facilitated by the deaths of both Tokuda and Stalin in 1953. On January 1, 1955, the JCP engaged in self-criticism, labeling the insurgency "adventurism of the extreme left," and at the 6th Party Congress of June 27 1955, the JCP renounced the militant line completely, returning to its old "peaceful line" of gradually pursuing socialist revolution through peaceful, democratic means. After the 6th Party Congress, the JCP adopted a policy of not excluding any party members who, though they had made mistakes, recognized the errors of the armed struggle and party split, and intended sincerely to make an effort to support the new party line. People who refused to accept this shift by the party to peaceful accommodationism would go on to form the nucleus of a variety of Japanese New Left movements, including the Japan Communist League and the similarly named Japan Revolutionary Communist League.

Currently, JCP's official evaluation is that, "The policy of the 5th Party Congress was not officially adopted by the party but rather was born from the breakup and subsequent takeover of the party apparatus by Tokuda's Shokanha faction and the imposition of armed struggle on us by the Soviet Union and China. The division of the party and the extreme-left adventurism orchestrated by the Shokanha were a serious mistake."

== How to Raise Flower Bulbs ==
How to Raise Flower Bulbs was the secret publication setting out concepts relating to the party's military policy such as construction and use of Molotov cocktails. It was actually an official bulletin called Internal and External Critiques, but took the title of How to Raise Flower Bulbs in order to disguise that. It was published several times through mimeograph.

== Participation in the Mountain Village Operation Units ==
The policy of establishing the Mountain Village Operation Units was out of touch with the real situation in Japan's countryside and they were not supported at all by the locals. The exception was the travelling clinics operated by deployed medical teams who were greeted warmly in many of the villages they visited without local doctors. However, their arts and culture-based campaign, including such thing as kamishibai attacking "feudalistic" landlords, was not accepted by locals and their newspapers and propaganda leaflets were quickly handed over to the police. Without achieving any of its aims, the operations of the Mountain Village Operation Units were extinguished by a police crackdown.

In deference to the policy of the JCP, there were also students who had quit their studies and joined the Mountain Village Operation Units. It is said that these participants were in deep despair at the change in policy of the 6th Party Congress. Some of the members who escaped exposure in the police crackdown holed up in the mountains and aimed to support themselves but, being neglected and unsupplied by the JCP, they naturally dissolved. The recollections of participants are published in certain New Left bulletins, and the Mountain Village Operation Units at the time of the 6th Party Congress is the backdrop for Sho Shibata's Akutagawa Award-winning 1964 novel Saredo Warera ga Hibi ("Those Were the Days, However...").

On the other hand, it is thought that there were differences in the directive and goals of “Y Organization” on the one hand, the JCP’s Military Affairs Committee including the Chukaku Jieitai and Dokuritsu Yugekitai which were purely in the armed struggle, and the Mountain Village Operation Units on the other hand where armed struggle coexisted with appeals to the masses. There were also people among the members of Mountain Village Operation Units who thought that the policy of armed struggle was an absurd idea and remained active in the Units without supporting the policy. Participation in the Units was by the appointment of the JCP Directorate which supported Kyuichi Tokuda’s Shokanha faction, and there are some who testified that service was assigned as a punishment to students who had belonged to the former faction of Kenji Miyamoto.
