= 10.21 International Anti-War Day Struggle =

Japanese New Left riots that occurred on October 21, 1969

The 10.21 International Anti-War Day Struggle refers to the Japanese New Left riots that occurred on October 21, 1969, centered in Shinjuku, Tokyo.

== Overview of the incident ==
On this day, which coincided with International Anti-War Day, various factions of the New Left planned large-scale street protests following the previous year's International Anti-War Day Struggle (the Shinjuku Riot) and clashed with the riot police in several locations, primarily around Shinjuku.

In addition to Shinjuku, students armed with Molotov cocktails also invaded and occupied the Japan Productivity Center, NHK Broadcasting Center, and Japan Industrial Club. There was also an incident where Molotov cocktails were thrown at the Honjo Police Station.

The number of arrests during this incident reached 1,594, the highest number recorded at that time. However, this record would be surpassed the following month during the Struggle to Prevent Prime Minister Eisaku Satō's visit to the U.S.

Many of those arrested were students from local universities who were not familiar with the geography of Tokyo. Although there were also teachers among the demonstrators and detainees, the Japan Teachers' Union stated that they were not involved. For five teachers in their 20s belonging to the Hiroshima Prefectural Teachers' Union, who were arrested on charges such as conspiracy to prepare a weapon, the union indicated that they would not expel them but refused to engage in relief activities. The five were indicted in November, leading the Hiroshima Prefectural Board of Education to impose dismissal sanctions.

Incidents occurred in which police officers on duty were attacked and injured. On October 27, 1969, the Tokyo Metropolitan Police awarded special promotions to 44 officers who had been injured in the line of duty. Of these, 40 officers required more than six months of treatment for their injuries.

On November 8, 1969, the Public Security Bureau of the Tokyo Metropolitan Police conducted a search warrant at the Tokyo University of Aeronautics and Astronautics. There suspected that university chemicals and equipment were being used to systematically produce Molotov cocktails.

== Related Topics ==
- Naoki Inose - As the chairperson of the All University Joint Struggle Council at Shinshu University, he led a key faction in the student movement and participated in the International Anti-War Day Struggle in October (Source: Toshio Usui "Living Through Times of Rebellion" Asahi Shimbun Publications, 2010, Page 144).
- Mishima Incident - Yukio Mishima mentioned this event during a speech.
- Kyozen x Maebuchi Gebageba 90 Minutes! - This day coincided with the third broadcast, during which footage of clashes between demonstrators and riot police shot from the rooftop of Odakyu Department Store was aired, narrated by announcer Haruo Kubo.
