= Kan'ichi Kuroda =

Japanese political philosopher, 1927–2006

- 黒田寛一
- Born: October 20, 1927; Fuchū, Tokyo, Japan
- Died: June 26, 2006 (aged 78); Kasukabe, Saitama, Japan
- Occupation: Political philosopher

Philosophical work
- School: Marxism; Trotskyism

Kan'ichi Kuroda (黒田 寛一, Kuroda Kan'ichi; October 20, 1927 – June 26, 2006) was a self-taught Japanese political philosopher and social theorist, associated with Trotskyism, who was deeply involved in far-left political movements. Nearly blind, Kuroda was affectionately nicknamed "The Blind Prophet" and "KuroKan" by his followers.

== Early life and education ==
Born in Fuchū, Tokyo, as the son of a doctor, he began studying Marxist philosophy at the age of twenty, in 1947, following the defeat of Japan and the subsequent U.S. occupation of Japan. Kuroda began studying closely works by prominent Japanese philosophers, among them Katsumi Umemoto, Akihide Kakehashi and Kōzō Uno.

== Political activism ==
In 1956, following Soviet Premier Nikita Khrushchev's "Secret Speech" and the brutal suppression of the Hungarian Revolution, Kuroda developed a strongly Anti-Stalinist position and turned against the Japan Communist Party (JCP). In 1957, he joined Tōichi Kurihara and others to form the first Trotskyist organization in Japanese history, the Japan Revolutionary Communist League, abbreviated Kakukyōdō in Japanese. Kakukyōdō, with Kuroda as its main theorist, argued that the Stalinist form of communism, which it viewed as predominant in Eastern Europe, China, the USSR, and North Korea, did not elevate the working class as true as Marxist communism intended. Kakukyōdō's stated goals were to overthrow the Japanese government, end U.S. occupation of Okinawa, and abolish the U.S.–Japan Alliance. In particular, Kuroda criticised the mechanical "materialism" that was prevalent in the orthodox Marxism, and instead developed a philosophical theory of "Materialist Subjectivity".

In 1959, Kuroda Kan'ichi was expelled from Kakukyōdō in the wake of a scandal in which he tried to sell compromising information about the JCP to the Tokyo Metropolitan Police Department (MPD). Thereafter, Kuroda, along with his right-hand man Nobuyoshi Honda, founded their own, splinter group of Kakukyōdō, with the appellation "National Committee" added to the name, and took many of their followers with them to create the "Japan Revolutionary Communist League National Committee".

Kuroda's branch of Kakukyōdō rapidly gained influence in the nationwide student federation Zengakuren, as many left-leaning students flocked to Kuroda's teachings. At Kuroda's urging, Kakukyōdō-affiliated students participated vigorously in the massive 1960 Anpo protests against the U.S.–Japan Security Treaty adopting a Trotskyist approach of taking "direct action" to "expose the inherent contradictions of Japanese monopoly capitalism."

However in 1963, Kuroda's branch of Kakukyōdō itself splintered as the result of disagreements between Kuroda and Honda over whether to pursue socialist revolution in alliance with others, or to focus on strengthening and expanding a single revolutionary organization, with the resultant split of the organization into a "Central Core Faction" (Chūkaku-ha), which was led by Honda and favored allying with others, and the "Revolutionary Marxist Faction" (abbreviated Kakumaru-ha), which staunchly adhered to Kuroda’s insistence on going it alone.

Under Kuroda's guidance, Kakumaru-ha participated in a number of protest movements in the later 1960s and 1970s, including the 1968-69 Japanese university protests, the 1970 Anpo protests, and the Sanrizuka Struggle against the construction of Narita Airport. It also engaged in violent conflict with Kuroda's erstwhile comrade and arch-rival Honda's Chūkaku-ha. By the mid-1970s, this conflict was resulting in several deaths per year—16 in 1975 alone, including Kakumaru-ha's assassination of Honda himself.

== Later life and death ==
Kuroda continued to lead Kakumaru-ha into the 1990s, when he retired due to ill-health. In 2006, he died of liver failure at the age of 78.

== Writings ==
Kuroda penned over fifty books, published both in Japan and other countries, on such subjects as Marxist philosophy, analysis of Soviet society, Japanese cultural history, theory and praxis of organization building, and contemporary politics. Some of his works include:

- Hegel and Marx , May 1952
- Destruction of the Revolution, 1991
- Gorbachev's Nightmare, 1992
- Praxiology, 1998 Tokyo: Kobushi Shobo
- Essential Terms of Revolutionary Marxism, 1998 Tokyo: Kobushi Shobo
- Kuroda's Thought on Revolution, 2000
- Engels' Political Economy, 2000
- Dialectics of Praxis, 2001
- On Organizing Praxis, 2001
- Studies on Marxism in Postwar Japan, 2002
- Dialectics of Society, 2003
- Methodology of Social Science, 2005

== Notes ==
- Praxiology (英語版改訂) is defined as the philosophy of Inter-Human Subjectivity
