= Masao Maruyama (scholar) =

Japanese political scientist

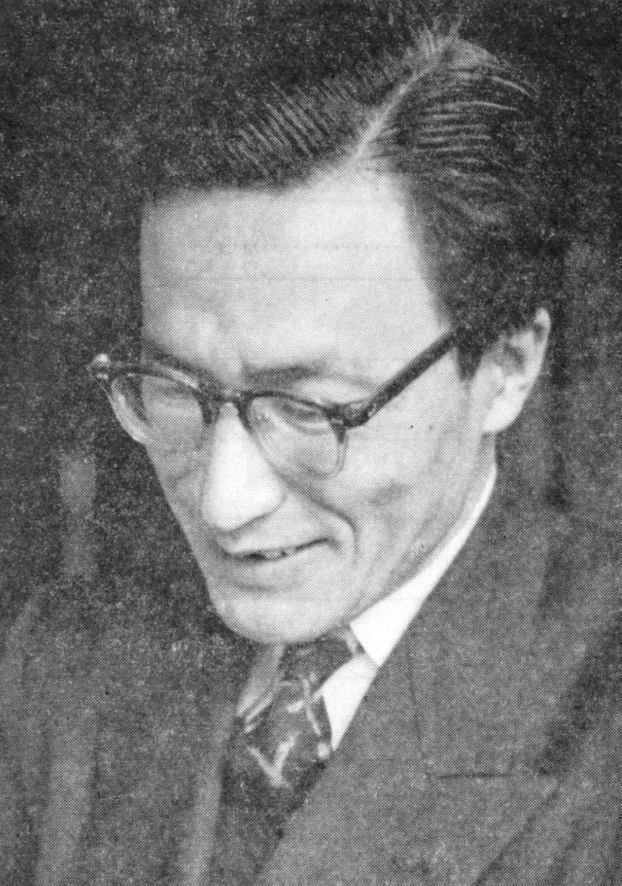
- Born: 22 March 1914; Osaka, Japan
- Died: 15 August 1996 (aged 82); Tokyo, Japan
- Education: Tokyo Imperial University
- Occupations: Thinker; political scientist; historian; professor

Masao Maruyama (丸山 眞男, Maruyama Masao; 22 March 1914 – 15 August 1996) was a leading Japanese political scientist and political theorist. His expertise lay in the history of Japanese political thought, to which he made major contributions.

== Early life ==
Maruyama Masao was born in Osaka in 1914. He was the second son of journalist Maruyama Kanji. He was influenced by friends of his father such as Hasegawa Nyozekan, a circle of people identified with the liberal current of political thought during the period of Taishō democracy. After graduating from Tokyo Furitsu Number One Middle School (currently known as Tokyo Municipal Hibiya High School), he entered the Tokyo Imperial University and graduated from the Faculty of Law in 1937. His thesis "The Concept of the Nation-state in Political Science" earned a Distinguished Thesis Award, and Maruyama was appointed assistant in the same department.

Originally he had wanted to specialize in European political thought, but changed his focus to concentrate on Japanese political thought, a subject that until that time mainly centered around the concept of an imperial state, and was influenced by a foundational ordinance that required subjects to be taught "in accordance with the needs of the state." Maruyama brought to the discipline a theoretical perspective grounded in extensive comparativism. The person who originally recommended this path to him was his mentor, Professor Shigeru Nambara, who was highly critical of military and bureaucratic obstructions to the growth of a constitutionally defined "national community." An expert in European political thought, Nambara steered the young Maruyama into working on these topics.

In March 1945, Maruyama was drafted and stationed in the Army at Hiroshima. After experiencing the atomic blast at Hiroshima and seeing out the end of the war there, he returned to his post at the university in September. He caught tuberculosis at the time, and after an operation, spent the rest of his life on one lung.

== Rise to fame ==
Maruyama first attracted attention from the scholarly community immediately following the war with his famous essay on wartime Japanese fascism, "The Logic and Psychology of Ultranationalism," first published in the widely-read journal Sekai in 1946. In particular, Maruyama deemed the prewar imperial system a "system of irresponsibility." Maruyama continued to write about wartime and contemporary Japanese politics in the late 1940s and early 1950s, until he was forced to take a break from scholarly activities due to his being in and out of hospitals with illnesses in the mid-1950s. He returned to his research in the late 1950s, but ceased writing about recent politics and focused his attention on excavating the political thought of the Edo and Meiji periods. It was not until the late 1950s that Maruyama's earlier essays were anthologized and republished for the first time, bringing him fame and acclaim from a much broader cross-section of the Japanese general public.

== Role in protest movements ==
Maruyama became involved in the Anpo Protests against revision of the US-Japan Security Treaty at an early stage, in 1959, and became involved in a variety of protest activities and publishing anti-treaty statements. Shortly after the shocking ramming of the Treaty through the Diet by Prime Minister Nobusuke Kishi on 19 May 1960, Maruyama emerged as one of the main faces of the anti-Treaty movement. On 24 May, he gave a dramatic speech "Time for a Choice" (Sentaku no toki) to an over-capacity crowd at a hall in central Tokyo. Maruyama argued that Japan was about to choose between democracy and dictatorship. He also argued that due to Kishi's outrageous actions, ordinary Japanese people needed to support the anti-Treaty protests in order to protect democracy, even if they did not mind the Treaty itself.

However, Maruyama later came to regret his starring role in the 1960 crisis. In the aftermath of the protests, Maruyama was attacked by opponents on both the right and the left. From the right, he was attacked as a supporter of communists and socialists, and from the left, he was accused of being a supporter of a very narrow vision of "bourgeois" democracy that only supported the interest of the ruling capitalist classes. Maruyama was most strongly attacked by fellow leftist intellectual Yoshimoto Takaaki, who had a large following among New Left student radicals. During the university protests in the late 1960s Maruyama was strongly denounced by the students front as a symbol of "self-deceiving" postwar democracy. Maruyama in turn criticized this new student movement, especially after he was subjected to intense harassment and his personal office at the University of Tokyo was ransacked by occupying students in 1969. Around this time, Maruyama angrily confronted the students, Maruyama telling them, "Even the fascists didn't do what you are trying to do!" This kind of episode, combined with his own ailing health, forced him to retire in 1971. He was however appointed professor emeritus at the same university in 1974.

== Later life ==
Though Maruyama suffered from poor health especially in his later life, he continued studying and writing until he died in Tokyo on 15 August 1996. The major work of his retirement years was a three-volume commentary on Fukuzawa Yukichi's principal work Bunmeiron no Gairyaku, based on a lengthy seminar he conducted with a small working group. This was published in 1986, as Reading 'An Outline of a Theory of Civilisation', (「文明論之概略」を読む) by Iwanami Shoten. Besides, he contributed several more noteworthy as well as controversial works on Japanese culture or the process of translation in modern Japan. Most noteworthy is his concept of basso ostinato. Maruyama referred to this musicological concept to capture a socio-historically substratum underlying human thought. Although basso ostinato is in constant flux, it is experienced by people as a relatively stable intellectual framework through which people give meaning to life.

== See also ==
- Hegelianism
- Social liberalism
- Liberalism in Japan

== Honors ==
- Order of the Sacred Treasure, Gold Rays with Neck Ribbon, 1976.
- Association for Asian Studies (AAS), 1993 Award for Distinguished Contributions to Asian Studies

== Representative works in English ==
- 1963 -- Thought and Behaviour in Modern Japanese Politics. London: Oxford University Press. ISBN 978-1-59740-083-1 (cloth) {reprinted by Columbia University Press, New York, 1995. ISBN 978-0-231-10141-7 (paper)
- 1974 -- Studies in the Intellectual History of Tokugawa Japan. Translated by Mikiso Hane. Princeton: Princeton University Press. ISBN 978-0-691-07566-2 (cloth) ISBN 978-0-691-00832-5 (paper)
