= Democratic Youth League of Japan =

Youth organisation in Japan

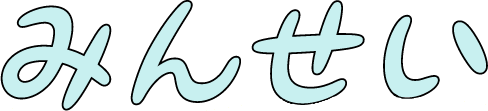

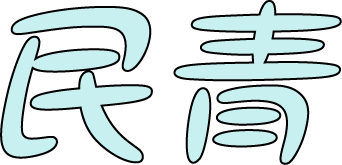
- Founded: 5 April 1923
- Headquarters: 4 Kamiyama, Shibuya, Tokyo 150-0047, Japan
- Membership: ▼7,000 (2025)
- Mother party: Japanese Communist Party
- International affiliation: World Federation of Democratic Youth (formerly)
- Website: www.dylj.or.jp

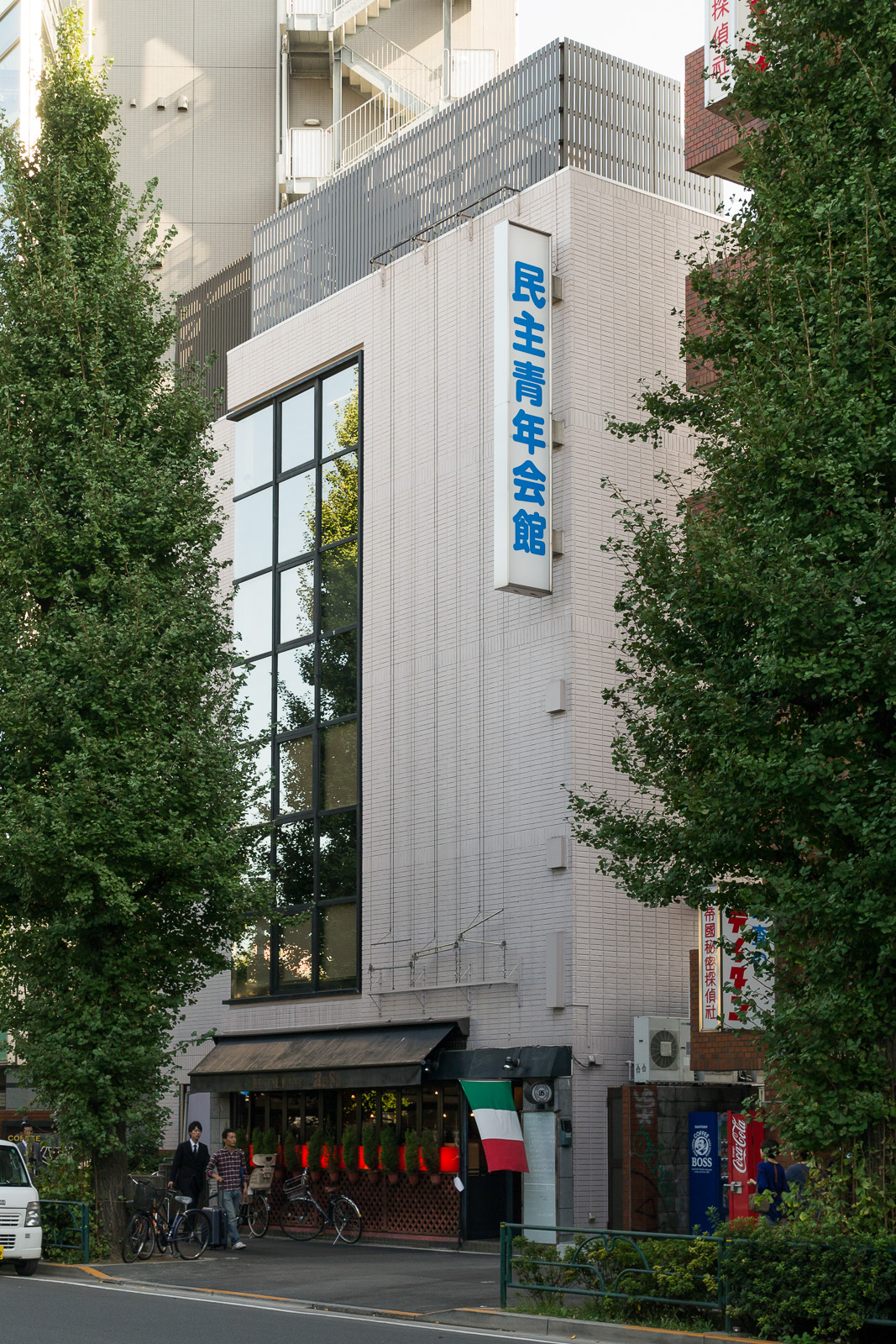
Headquarters of the Democratic Youth League of Japan

The Democratic Youth League of Japan (Japanese: 日本民主青年同盟, Hepburn: Nihon Minshu Seinen Domei), abbreviated DYLJ or Minsei (民青(みんせい)), is a political youth organization in Japan. It consults with and receives assistance from the Japanese Communist Party. Minsei describes itself as a "voluntary youth organization in response to a keen demand of the youth, aiming towards a better life, peace, independence, democracy and social progress". Its main activities are peace movement, opposition to tuition hikes, petitions, volunteer work and educational activities and the like.

== History ==
The DYLJ was formed on 5 April 1923 in the Empire of Japan as the Japanese Communist Youth League (JCYL), influenced by the Russian Revolution in Russia. Like the JCP, it focused on suffrage for young Japanese aged 18 and above, the overthrow of the "Emperor system", equal pay for equal work, and opposition to militarization. Also, like the JCP, it was banned under the Peace Preservation Law and some of its members, such as Kawai Yoshitora, Takashima Mato, and Iijima Kimi, were arrested by police and were either killed during interrogations or else died in prison.

After World War II, the JCYL was re-established in tandem with the re-establishment of the JCP. Following a series of violent misadventures in the 1950s, in which the JCP tried to foment an immediate communist revolution and ordered the JCYL into the mountains to help form "Mountain Village Guerrilla Squads", the JCP hastily retreated from its former militant line and the JCYL was recast as a "force for peace and democracy" and renamed the Democratic Youth League of Japan. Minsei's last bit of militant activism took place during the massive 1960 Anpo protests against the U.S.-Japan Security Treaty, in which many Minsei students took part. However, thereafter the JCP and Minsei increasingly eschewed extra-parliamentary street protests. In 1960, during its 6th National Congress, Minsei established its "Agreement" and "Call to the Youth League", whereby the League promised to pursue "peaceful, scientific socialism."

At the height of the 1968–1969 Japanese university protests, while other students were hurling rocks and stones at police, Minsei students observed major events such as International Anti-War Day in 1968 by holding peaceful potluck picnics in the park, and emphasized peaceful forms of activism such as petitioning university administrations to improve campus facilities, a focus on mundane daily life that led the more militant students derisively nicknamed the "toilet paper line." However, when Zenkyōtō activists began barricading university campuses, some Minsei students began arming themselves with helmets and staves and engaged in violent battles with the militant student activists. The Minsei students claimed they were "defending" the university from attack, and whereas other students called their staves gebabō ("violence sticks"), the Minsei students called their staves minshūkabō ("democratization sticks").

Minsei membership peaked in 1970 at around 200,000 students before declining steadily thereafter, in tandem with the decline of the Japan Communist Party and the Japanese student movement in general. In recent years, Minsei has consistently listed its membership as "around 10,000" students.
