= Takaaki Yoshimoto =

Japanese poet and philosopher

- 吉本隆明
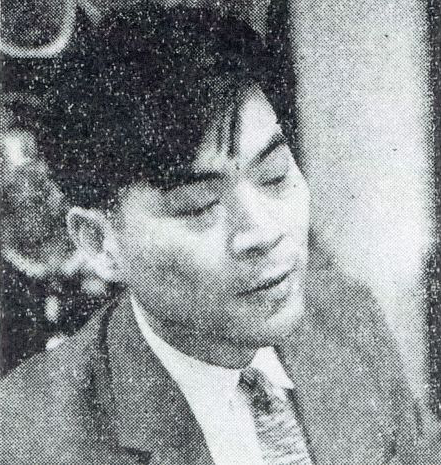
- Yoshimoto in 1960
- Born: November 25, 1924; Tsukishima, Tokyo
- Died: March 16, 2012 (aged 87); Bunkyō, Tokyo
- Other name: Ryūmei Yoshimoto
- Education: Tokyo Institute of Technology
- Occupations: Poet, philosopher, literary critic
- Years active: 1952–2012

Takaaki Yoshimoto (吉本 隆明, Yoshimoto Takaaki; 25 November 1924 – 16 March 2012), also known as Ryūmei Yoshimoto, was a Japanese poet, philosopher, and literary critic. As a philosopher, he is remembered as a founding figure in the emergence of the New Left in Japan, and as a critic, he was at the forefront of a movement to force writers to confront their responsibility as wartime collaborators.

Yoshimoto is the father of Japanese writer Banana Yoshimoto and of cartoonist Yoiko Haruno.

== Early life ==
Yoshimoto was born in 1924, in Tsukishima, Tokyo, the third son of family of boatmakers who managed a small boatyard. Shortly before his birth, his family had moved to Tokyo from Amakusa, Kumamoto prefecture, on the southern island of Kyushu. In his teens, Yoshimoto came under the influence of literature while receiving private tutoring, and began to write poetry. He was influenced by the work of Takamura Kōtarō and Miyazawa Kenji. He was a 'militarist youth' during the war, but experienced the end of the war while mobilized for manual labor, and thereon became fascinated by Marxism.

Yoshimoto attended Tashima Elementary School in the Kyobashi Ward of Tokyo, Yonezawa Engineering School (Now Yamagata University), and graduated in 1947 from the Engineering Division of Tokyo Institute of Technology with a degree in Electrochemistry. During his studies, he became friends with literary critic Takeo Okuno.

After graduation, Yoshimoto moved to industry, became a research student in 1950, and in 1952 took a position at Tokyo Ink Manufacturing Company Ltd. He continued his poetic output, writing his first representative works, Dialogue with Particularity and Ten Works for a Change in Position, and won the Arechi prize for new poets. He published a work of criticism on Takamura Kōtarō.

== As a father figure to the New Left ==
Yoshimoto, who had pursued a theory of war responsibility of the literati, supported the Anpo Protests against the 1960 revision of the US-Japan Security Treaty as an expression of the contradictions of the postwar order fifteen years after the end of the war. Strongly opposing the new treaty, he became an "enthusiastic supporter" and "patron saint" of the Zengakuren student activists. Yoshimoto was invited to give speeches at Zengakuren meetings in December 1959 and January 1960, and he joined the student activists in a sit-in at Shinagawa Station in Tokyo as part of a nationwide general strike against the Treaty on June 4, 1960. On June 15, 1960, at the climax of the protests, he joined the Zengakuren students in crashing into the National Diet compound. Leaping up on top of a truck, he gave an impromptu lecture encouraging the students to continue their resistance. Thereafter a violent clash with police occurred, resulting in the death of Tokyo University student Michiko Kanba. In the aftermath, Yoshimoto was arrested and interrogated for three days by the police, before being released without charges.

The failure of the anti-treaty movement to stop the treaty from being ratified left Yoshimoto angry and disillusioned with "Old Left"-style political activism. In October 1960, he published an essay offering a blistering postmortem of the protests entitled "The End of Fictions" (Gisei no shūen), in which he asserted that the anti-treaty protests had exposed not only the "fictions" of the ruling conservatives, but also the "fictions" of established left-wing political organizations and mainstream left-leaning intellectuals. Yoshimoto concluded that the only path forward was to reject the oppression of existence and pursue absolute individual autonomy (jiritsusei).

In September 1961, Yoshimoto co-founded the magazine Experiment (Shikkō) with like-minded activists Tanigawa Gan and Murakami Ichiro, as a place to publish essays and criticism completely independently of any established organization. The journal published articles by Miura Tsutomu, who had been expelled from the Communist Party after the critique of Stalin, his disciple Takimura Ryuichi, Nango Tsugumasa, and others. Edazawa Shunsuke and others made their debuts as critics in Shikkō.

Over the remainder of the 1960s, Yoshimoto became a hero to the New Left student activists, and came to be known as the "prophet" (kyōso) of the New Left. New Left activists especially appreciated that Yoshimoto was developing a positive theoretical discourse in the midst of the collapse of the Communist Party's heroic status after the failure of the anti-Treaty movement and endless, contentious and dispiriting schisms within the left. Yoshimoto's books became best-sellers, especially his 1962 essay collection The End of Fictions, named after his famous 1960 essay of the same name (which was anthologized within). In these and other essays, Yoshimoto developed an independent theory of the arts in the face of criticisms of the Communist Party and sectarian literary theories, emphasizing the aesthetics of language and psychological phenomena, and his concept of "communal fantasy" (共同幻想, kyōdō gensō), describing how the propaganda and militarism of the wartime era "swept away virtually the entire population in a wave of war frenzy". Yoshimoto's philosophy of radical individualism became a refuge for students and intellectuals exasperated by the then-current sectarian and bureaucratic Marxism.

As a result, Yoshimoto's anti-sectarian philosophy of independence and individualism became a major influence and theoretical resource in the 1960s and 1970s for the Zengakuren, Zenkyoto, and other 'non-sect' New Leftists. He was regarded as required reading for participants in the 1968–69 Japanese university protests. This was in spite of his remaining aloof from, and taking a critical stance toward, the student protests of the later 1960s, a stance which was a consequence of his aversion to sectarianism and party-driven movements. Yoshimoto eventually concluded that even the radically egalitarian and highly individualistic New Left protest groups were not individualistic enough, and were still part of the same form of "communal fantasy" (共同幻想, kyōdō gensō) which had led Japan into World War II.

== From the 1980s ==
Beginning in the 1980s, Yoshimoto published a theory of the masses, The Mass Image, and particular a theory of the city in The High Image I-III. At this time, Yoshimoto appeared in the women's magazine AnAn wearing clothing by Comme des Garçons. Criticized by Haniya Yutaka as "wearing capitalism itself", Yoshimoto was criticized for turning right. Indeed, afterwards Yoshimoto did become more politically conservative, becoming a supporter of Ichirō Ozawa.

In the latter part of the 1980s, Yoshimoto criticized the anti-nuclear power and anti-nuclear weapons movements started by intellectual advocates of postwar democracy such as Kenzaburō Ōe as 'Anti-Nuclear Fascism".

In the 1990s, after characterizing the yoga practices of Asahara Shoko of Aum Shinrikyo as expressing the inner core of early Buddhist asceticism, Yoshimoto was criticized along with Nakazawa Shin'ichi as a defender of Aum following the Sarin gas attack on the Tokyo subway.

In August 1996, Yoshimoto was in critical condition after falling unconscious while swimming in Toicho, Shizuoka Prefecture, but survived. After the mid-1990s, his work tended towards informal essays.

In 2003, he won the Kobayashi Hideo Prize for his book Reading Natsume Sōseki (夏目漱石を読む), and his collected works received the Fujimura Memorial prize.

== Philosophy and reception ==
Yoshimoto was a wide-ranging author who wrote on literature, subculture, politics, society, and religion (including Shinran and the New Testament).

Yoshimoto is known as a giant of postwar thought, and had an enormous influence in the 1960s and 1970s in Japan. He published many dialogues with overseas intellectuals visiting Japan, such as Michel Foucault, Félix Guattari, Ivan Illich, and Jean Baudrillard.

Yoshimoto, who did not hold an academic pedigree, supported intellectuals who have devoted themselves to solitary study. He has also engaged in a number of belligerent exchanges. Famous among these have been his dispute with Kiyoteru Hanada, with New Testament scholar Kenzō Tagawa, and with his former friend and critic Yutaka Haniya.
