= Shigeru Nambara =

Japanese political scientist (1889–1974)

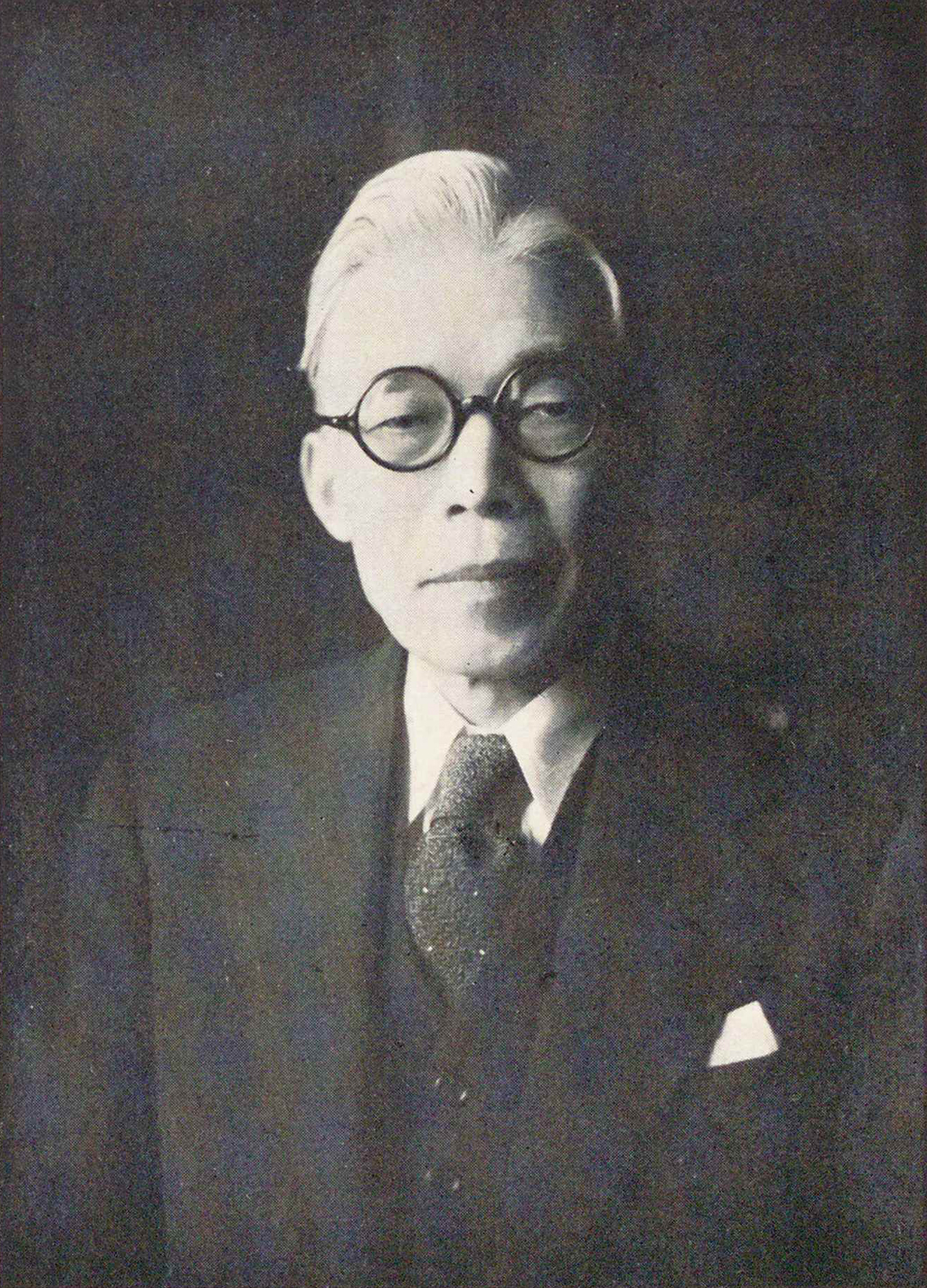
- Nambara in 1953
- Born: 5 September 1889; Kagawa, Empire of Japan
- Died: 19 May 1974 (aged 84)

Academic background
- Education: University of Tokyo (then called Tokyo Imperial University)

Academic work
- Discipline: Political Scientist
- Institutions: University of Tokyo
- Influenced: Maruyama Masao

Shigeru Nambara (南原繁) was a Japanese political scientist, who served as the president of the University of Tokyo and the Japan Academy, and as a member of the House of Peers.

== Life ==
Nambara was born on 5 September 1889 into a family that ran a sugar production company in Minamino, Kagawa. After studying at the First Higher School, he matriculated at Tokyo Imperial University, where he studied political science. After graduating in 1914, he passed the high-class bureaucrat recruitment examination and began working for the Home Ministry. During his seven-year career as a bureaucrat, he served as a provincial governor in Toyama for two years and initiated a large irrigation project there. He also drafted the Act of Labour Union in 1919, but it never reached the National Diet. He returned to his alma mater in 1921 and became an assistant professor.

During World War II, he published a book titled Nation and Religion: a Study of European Spiritual History, dedicating a chapter to the criticism of Nazi ideology, which was Japan's major ally at the time. He became the dean of the Faculty of Law in March 1945. Partly due to his scepticism against the country's pre-war ideology and his anti-war stance, he was elected president of the university in December 1945, four months after Japan's surrender. As the first post-war president of the university, he oversaw its transition to a more modern and democratic institution. Under his leadership, the university admitted its first female students, established the university co-op and the University of Tokyo Press, and revitalised the university's athletic culture.

During this period, he also served as a member of the House of Peers, where a few seats were reserved for scholars alongside the majority held by hereditary peers. As a member, he opposed signing a peace treaty solely with Western democracies, arguing that in the event of a war between the Western and Eastern blocs, it could lead to catastrophic results. When he visited the United States for the first time after the war in 1949 to attend a conference on education organised by the Home Secretary, he shared this view with Dwight Eisenhower, then president of Columbia University. This enraged Prime Minister Shigeru Yoshida, a staunch supporter of signing a peace treaty only with Western powers, who labelled him 'a wicked scholar who is willing to distort knowledge to ingratiate with the masses (曲学阿世の輩)'.

He later became the president of the Japan Academy and the Gakushikai, the official alumni club of the former Imperial Universities. He was posthumously awarded the Order of the Rising Sun, 1st Class and the Junior Second Rank.
