= Masaaki Osaka =

Japanese communist

Masaaki Osaka (大坂 正明, Ōsaka Masaaki; born c. 1950) is a Japanese Trotskyist and former senior member of the Revolutionary Communist League, National Committee. In June 2017, he was arrested for the murder of a policeman on 14 November 1971. His 46 years spent on the run is the longest in Japanese history.

== Biography ==
Osaka was a member of the Japan Revolutionary Communist League National Committee, called the Chūkaku-ha, or “middle core faction.”

He was put on the wanted list in 1972 after being charged with murder, assault and other offenses.

=== 1971 Shibuya riot ===
According to police, on November 14, 1971, during a demonstration by students and other activists protesting the ratification of a Japan-U.S. treaty on the reversion of Okinawa, which degenerated into a riot, he attacked Tsuneo Nakamura, a 21-year old police officer, battering him with a steel pipe and setting him on fire with a petrol bomb. The officer died from his injuries.

=== 2017 arrest ===
In June 2017, Osaka was arrested for obstructing police who raided an apartment in Hiroshima used as a hideout of the Chukaku-ha while searching for a fellow activist. They charged him with obstruction before later discovering his identity through DNA testing. He was charged with murder.
