= Act on Temporary Measures concerning University Management =

1969 law in Japan allowing the use of force by universities to deal with student unrest

The Act on Temporary Measures concerning University Management (大学の運営に関する臨時措置法, Daigaku no Un'ei ni Kansuru Rinjisochihō) of Japan was passed as Law No. 70 on August 7, 1969. It specified urgent measures to normalize management of universities disrupted by the 1968–69 Japanese university protests. The law was repealed in 2001.
