= Revolutionary Communist League, National Committee =

Revolutionary Communist League, National Committee 革命的共産主義者同盟全国委員会
- Founder: Kan'ichi Kuroda; Nobuyoshi Honda
- Founded: 1959
- Split from: Japan Revolutionary Communist League
- Headquarters: Edogawa, Tokyo
- Membership (2020): 4,700
- Ideology: Communism; Marxism; Anti-Stalinism; Anti-imperialism
- Political position: Far-left

Website
- http://www.zenshin.org/zh/

Japan Revolutionary Communist League, National Committee (革命的共産主義者同盟全国委員会, Kakumeiteki Kyōsanshugisha Dōmei, Zenkoku Iinkai) is a Japanese far-left revolutionary group, often referred to as Chūkaku-ha (中核派, "Central Core Faction") in Japanese. Their main goal is to have Japan, and the entire world, adopt communist policies. Chūkaku-ha rejects imperialism and Stalinism.

The group was long led by chairman Takeo Shimizu, who chaired the league from 1997 to September 2025.

The Japanese National Police Agency reports that as of 2020, 4,700 members are active in Chūkaku-ha.

== History ==
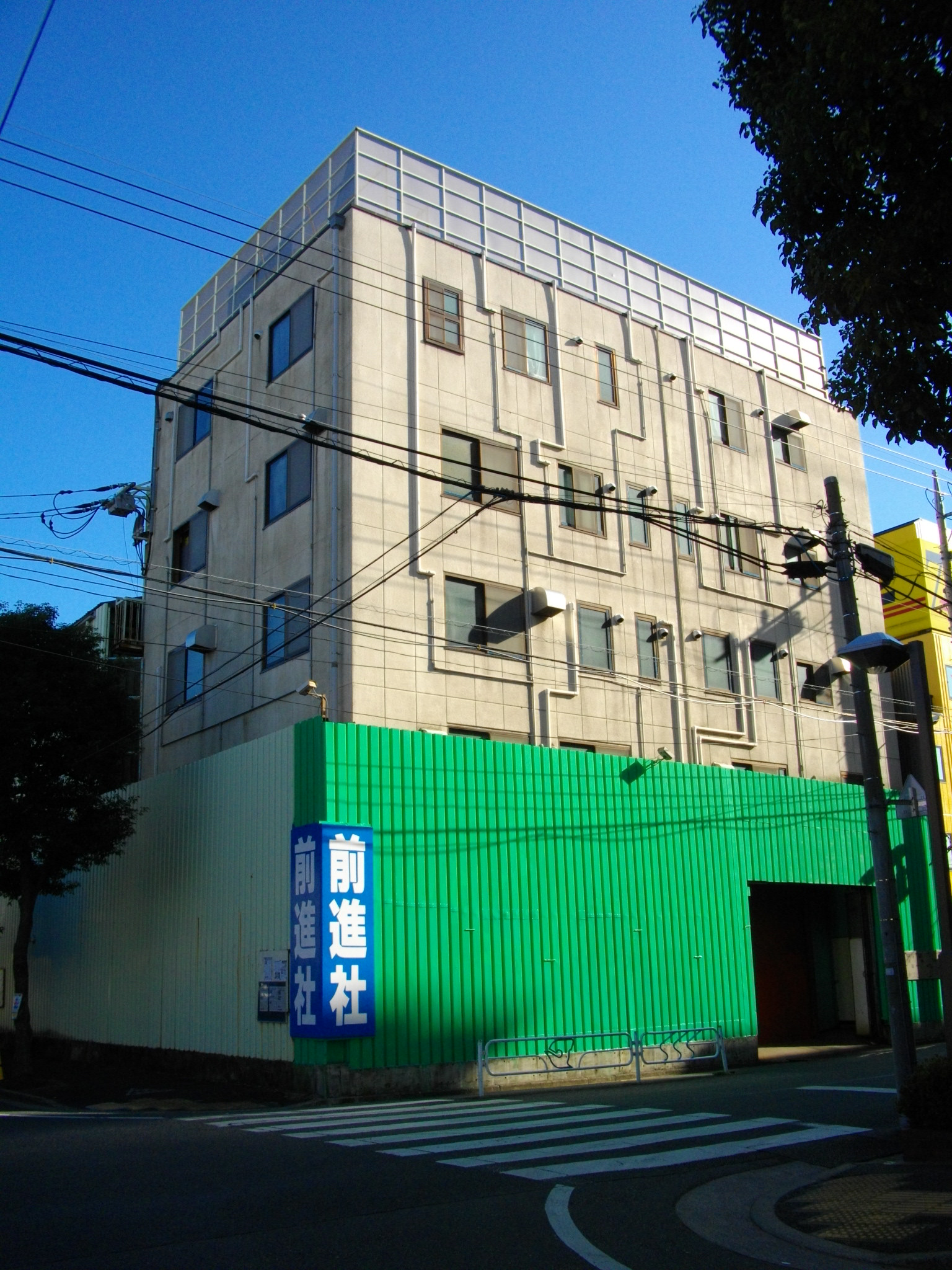
Headquarters in Edogawa, Tokyo

=== Prehistory of Chūkaku-ha ===
In 1957 a number of dissidents dissatisfied with the direction of the Japan Communist Party (JCP), along with a number of student activists from the Nationwide Zengakuren student federation, formed the Revolutionary Communist League (RCL), usually abbreviated as Kakukyōdō in Japanese. This group was fervently anti-Stalinist, and soon fell under the sway of the charismatic half-blind Trotskyist philosopher Kan'ichi Kuroda. The RCL believed the Stalinist form of communism, which they saw as predominant in Eastern Europe, China, the USSR, and North Korea, did not elevate the working class as true as Marxist communism intended. Their goals at this time were to overthrow the Japanese government, end U.S. occupation of Okinawa, and abolish the U.S.-Japan Alliance.

The group evolved into its current form (Chūkaku-ha) after a series of schisms. In 1959, Kuroda Kan'ichi was expelled from the RCL in the wake of a scandal in which he tried to sell compromising information about the JCP to the Tokyo Metropolitan Police Department (MPD). Therefore, Kuroda, along with his right-hand man Nobuyoshi Honda, founded their own version of the RCL, with the appellation "National Committee" added to the name, and took many of their followers with them to create the RCL-NC. In 1960, a youth branch of the RCL-NC was established for Zengakuren student activists as the Marxist Student League (MSL), abbreviated Marugakudō in Japanese. This was followed in 1961 by the creation of another youth branch for young labor unionists, the Marxist Workers' Youth League (MWYL).

Finally in 1963, the parent organization RCL-NC split in two as the result of a disagreement between Kuroda and Honda over whether to pursue socialist revolution in alliance with others, or to focus on strengthening and expanding a single revolutionary organization, with the resultant split of Marugakudō into the "Central Core Faction" (Chūkaku-ha), which was led by Honda and favored allying with others, and the "Revolutionary Marxist Faction" (abbreviated Kakumaru-ha) Zengakuren, which staunchly adhered to Kuroda's insistence on going it alone.

=== Chūkaku-ha era ===
Starting in the mid-1960s, Chūkaku-ha, became active in organizing protest activities. In 1966, Chūkaku-ha joined in alliance with two other radical student groups, the "Second Bund" (Daini Bunto) and the Liberation Faction of the Socialist Youth League (Kaihō-ha) to form the "Three-Faction" (Sanpa) Zengakuren. As part of the Sanpa Zengakuren, Chūkaku-ha participated in the October 8, 1967 protest at Haneda Airport which attempted to block Japanese Prime Minister Eisaku Satō from visiting South Vietnam. In 1968, they protested the visit of the nuclear-powered aircraft carrier, USS Enterprise, to Sasebo. Later that same year Chūkaku-ha participated in another protest of the Shinjuku Rail Station's transportation of US forces fuel tanks, remembered as the "Shinjuku Riot."

Beginning in 1968, Chūkaku-ha became involved in the Sanrizuka Struggle assisting farmers in violently opposing the construction of Narita Airport outside of Tokyo. Some members of Chūkaku-ha remained deeply involved in this struggle well into the 1980s.

In 1968 and 1969, the organization promoted several protests at campuses across Japan. Throughout this period and into the 1970s, Chūkaku-ha was engaged in violent conflict with their archrivals in Kakumaru-ha. During the conflict, Kakumaru-ha assassinated several members of Chūkaku-ha, including its leader Nobuyoshi Honda in 1975. According to Chūkaku-ha, Kakumaru-ha was aided and protected by the police.

Starting in the late 1970s, the group began committing armed assaults, bombings, and destruction of infrastructure in Japan. There were a fair number of casualties and injuries as a result of the dozens of attacks they conducted. Casualties included the chairperson of Chiba prefecture's Expropriation Committee, whose death delayed the area's development.

In 1986, their covert weapons factory was raided by police after two suspects were arrested for carrying an explosive in their truck. Chūkaku-ha's attacks continued into the later part of the 20th century, with the last one occurring in 2001.

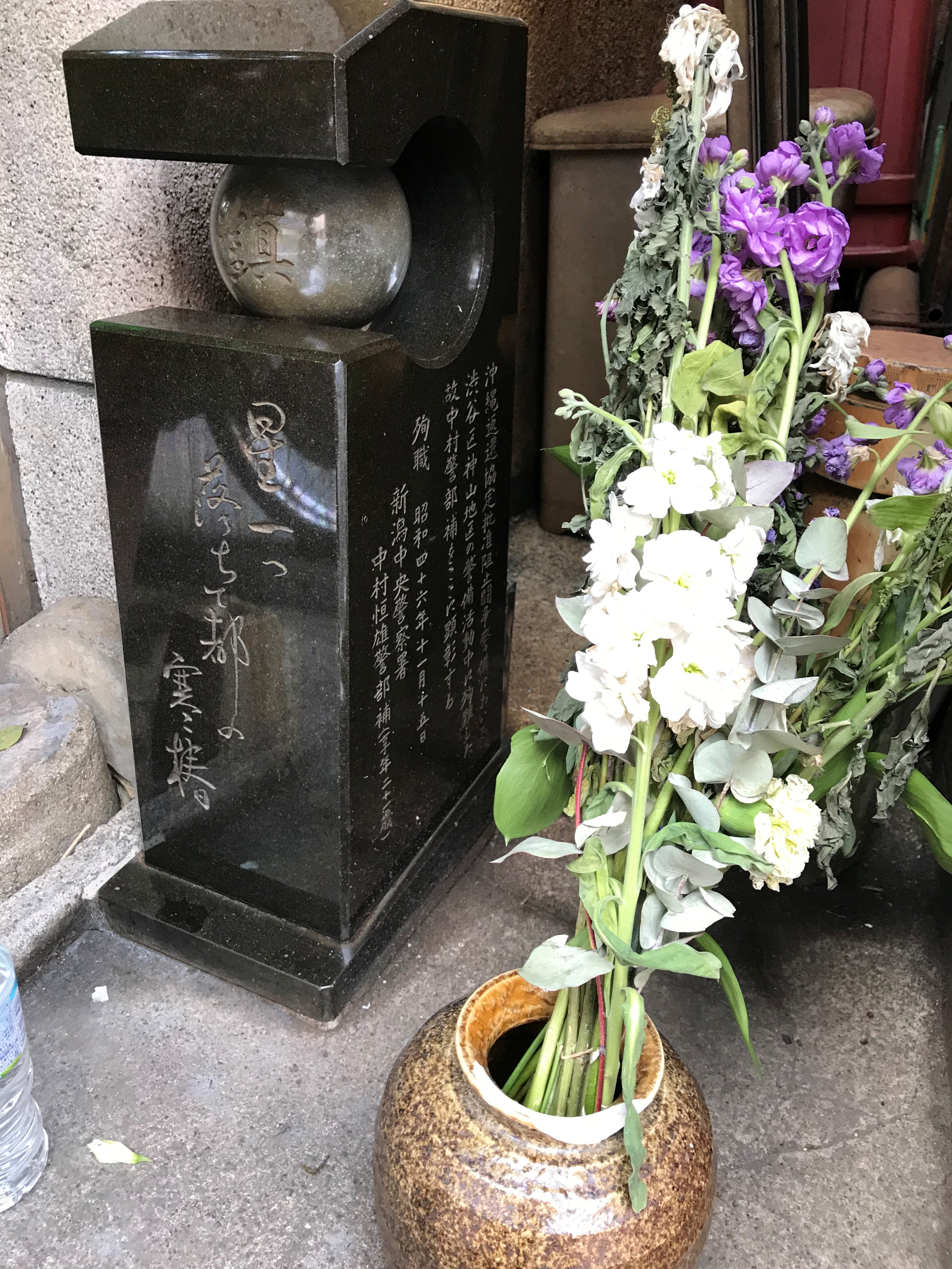
A memorial to a policeman who died during a riot in Shibuya

In 2017, the MPD announced the arrest of Masaaki Osaka, a known Chūkaku-ha leader accused of killing a police officer during a riot on November 14, 1971. On that day, a protest against the occupation of Okinawa by the United States turned violent, with students throwing Molotov cocktails at officers.

Today, Chūkaku-ha still stages protests and operates a YouTube channel to document and publicize its activities. Takeo Shimizu, one of Chūkaku-ha's surviving leaders, appeared in public after going underground since 1971 on September 6, 2020, at Arakawa, Tokyo. During a news conference on January 27, 2021, he criticized Tokyo for its COVID-19 response and asserted that the crisis was an opportunity for a revolution.

As of 2021, the organization has experienced a resurgence in interest among some young Japanese dissatisfied with the trajectory of the Japanese Communist Party. In May 2023, Chūkaku-ha organized an anti-G7 protest in Hiroshima, denouncing the G7 summit as "imperialism for nuclear war".

In September 2025, Shimizu retired due to his age.
