= Eiji Oguma =

Japanese scholar and filmmaker (born 1962)

Eiji Oguma (小熊 英二, Oguma Eiji) (born September 6, 1962) is a Japanese historical sociologist, a professor at Keio University, a documentary filmmaker, and a guitarist.

Born in Akishima in Tokyo Metropolis in 1962, Oguma received his PhD from Tokyo University in 1998. Since 1997, he has been on the faculty at Keio University, where he was named a full professor in 2007. Oguma has written extensively on postwar social and political history, and issues of Japanese nationalism. Recently, he has turned to documentary filmmaking, directing a documentary on Japanese protests against nuclear power in the aftermath of the 2011 Tōhoku earthquake and tsunami, entitled "Tell the Prime Minister" (2015).

== Selected publications ==
In a statistical overview derived from writings by and about Oguma Eiji, OCLC/WorldCat encompasses roughly 53 works in 150+ publications in 4 languages and 1,500+ library holdings library holdings.

- A Genealogy of "Japanese" Self-Images. (2002)
- 1968. (2009)
- "Nobody Dies in a Ghost Town: Path Dependence in Japan's 3.11 Disaster and Reconstruction". Asia-Pacific Journal. 11 (44). November 3, 2013.
- The Boundaries of "the Japanese". (2014)
- "Japan's 1968: A Collective Reaction to Rapid Economic Growth in an Age of Turmoil". Asia-Pacific Journal. 13 (12). March 28, 2015.
- "A New Wave Against the Rock: New Social Movements in Japan since the Fukushima Nuclear Meltdown". Asia-Pacific Journal. 14 (13). July 1, 2016.
