= Japan Revolutionary Communist League (Revolutionary Marxist Faction) =

Japan Revolutionary Communist League 日本革命的共産主義者同盟革命的マルクス主義派
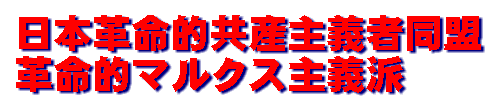
- Chairperson: Takuma Ueda
- Founded: 1959
- Ideology: Communism; Marxism; Anti-Stalinism; Trotskyism
- Political position: Far-left

Website
- www.jrcl.org

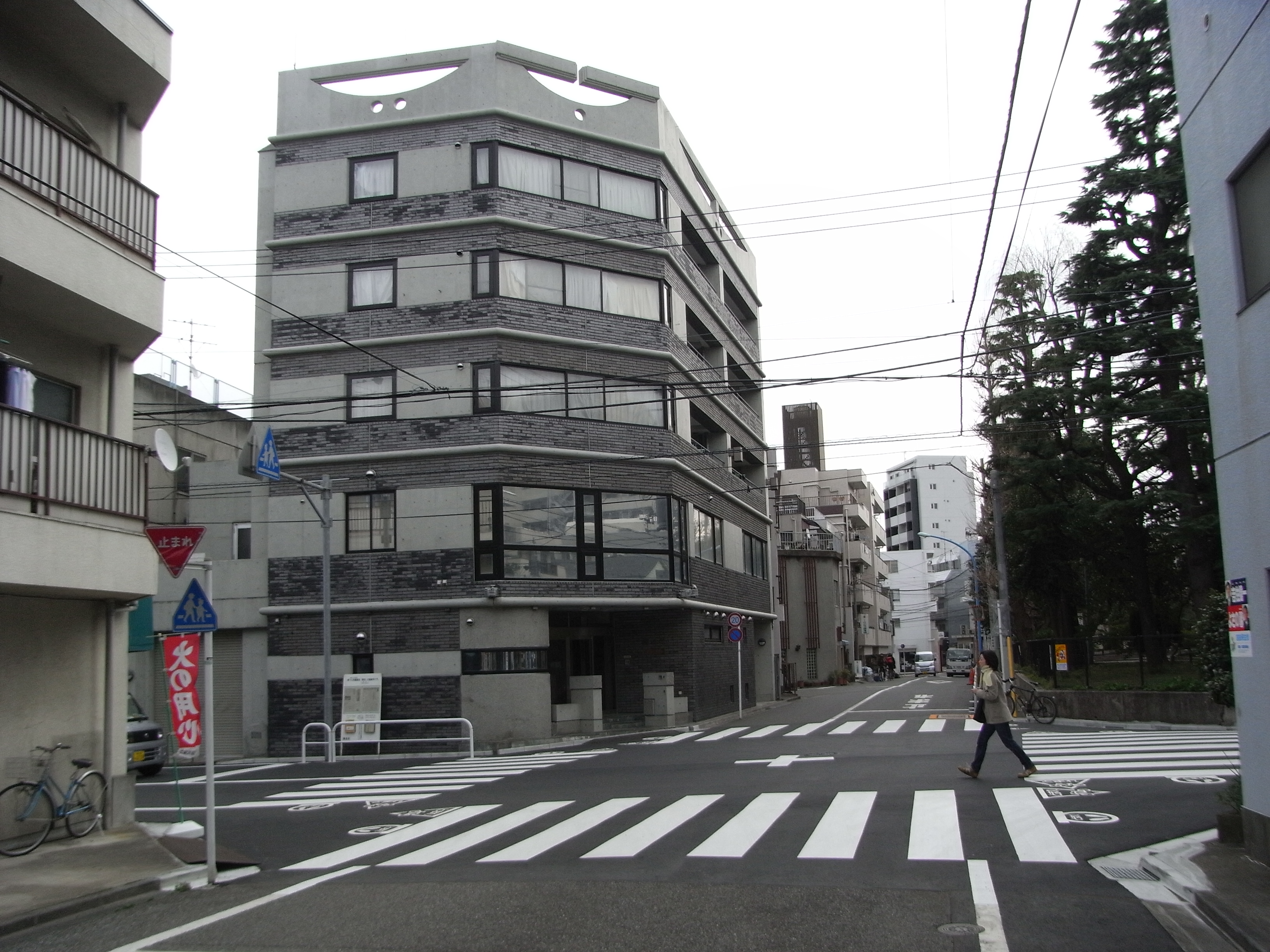
Headquarters in Waseda-tsurumaki-cho, Shinjuku, Tokyo

The Japan Revolutionary Communist League (Revolutionary Marxist Faction) (Japanese: 日本革命的共産主義者同盟革命的マルクス主義派, romanized: Nihon Kakumeiteki Kyōsanshugisha Dōmei, Kakumeiteki Marukusushugi Ha) is a Japanese Trotskyist revolutionary group, often referred to by the abbreviation Kakumaru-ha (Japanese: 革マル派). It is classified as far-left.

Formerly close to the Spartacist League, the group now has friendly relations with the International Leninist Trotskyist Fraction.

== History ==
The group's origins lie in its split from the Japanese Communist Party following the Hungarian Revolution of 1956. The dissenting factions attended a congress of the Japanese New Left in 1957 and agreed to unite as the Japan Revolutionary Communist League (RCL), usually abbreviated as Kakukyōdō in Japanese. This group was fervently anti-Stalinist, and soon fell under the sway of the charismatic half-blind Trotskyist philosopher Kan'ichi Kuroda. Their goals at this time were to overthrow the Japanese government, end U.S. occupation of Okinawa, and abolish the U.S.–Japan Alliance.

Kakumaru-ha evolved into its current form after a series of schisms. In 1959, Kuroda Kan'ichi was expelled from the RCL in the wake of a scandal in which he tried to sell compromising information about the JCP to the Tokyo Metropolitan Police Department (MPD). Therefore, Kuroda, along with his right-hand man Nobuyoshi Honda, founded their own version of the RCL, with the appellation "National Committee" added to the name, and took many of their followers with them to create the RCL-NC. In 1960, a youth branch of the RCL-NC was established for Zengakuren student activists as the Marxist Student League (MSL), abbreviated Marugakudō in Japanese.

Finally in 1963, the parent organization RCL-NC split in two as the result of a disagreement between Kuroda and Honda over whether to pursue socialist revolution in alliance with others, or to focus on strengthening and expanding a single revolutionary organization, with the resultant split of Marugakudō into the "Central Core Faction" (Chūkaku-ha), which was led by Honda and favored allying with others, and the "Revolutionary Marxist Faction" (abbreviated Kakumaru-ha), which staunchly adhered to Kuroda's insistence on going it alone.

The two groups had frequent violent conflicts and, by the mid-1970s, these were resulting in several deaths per year—16 in 1975 alone, including Kakumaru-ha's assassination of Chūkaku-ha's leader Honda Nobuyasu. The organisation subsequently engaged in a number of high-profile guerrilla activities while continuing to organise on university campuses, primarily through their Zengakuren faction. In 1998, police seized thousands of recordings of their conversations made by Faction members, which a spokesperson claimed had been "necessary to protect the organisation."

In the spring of 2019, a group led by Hideki Matsushiro, who has written many works on the labor movement and economics within the Revolutionary Maru faction, criticized the ideological control and individual organizational disposition by the central government of the Japan Revolutionary Communist Alliance Revolutionary Marxist faction (inquiry faction)Declared a split with this, and called it the "Fourth Division of the Revolution Community"..
