= Japan Revolutionary Communist League =

Japan Revolutionary Communist League 日本革命的共産主義者同盟 Nihon Kakumeiteki Kyōsanshugisha Dōmei
- Abbreviation: JRCL; Kakukyōdō
- Founded: December 1957
- Preceded by: Japanese Trotskyist Federation
- Merged into: Japan Revolutionary Communist League (Fourth International)
- Ideology: Communism; Trotskyism
- Political position: Far-left
- International affiliation: Fourth International
- Colors: Red

The Japan Revolutionary Communist League (日本革命的共産主義者同盟, Nihon Kakumeiteki Kyōsanshugisha Dōmei; abbr. JRCL or Kakukyōdō) is a Trotskyist group in Japan.

== History ==
Several small groups split from the Japanese Communist Party (JCP) following the Hungarian Revolution of 1956. They attended a congress in 1957 and agreed to unite as the JRCL. Although Japan had no history of Trotskyist organisations, they affiliated with the International Secretariat of the Fourth International, while also making contact with the U.S. Socialist Workers Party.

Many of the organisation's founding members were active in the All-Japan Federation of Student Autonomous Associations, and disagreed with the JCP policy forbidding the student group from developing any political lines distinct from the party. Other members initially attempted to work within the JCP, but leading member Kyoji Nishi was expelled in 1958. The following year, the party split, with dissidents including Kuroda Kan'ichi forming the Japan Revolutionary Communist League National Committee. The remainder of the party instead attempted entrism within the Japan Socialist Party. This continued until 1968, when the group re-established itself openly, after it had gained members during anti–Vietnam War protests. It remained part of the international Trotskyist movement, becoming part of the Fourth International (FI). The party increasingly turned to work in the trade unions, with some success. In 1991, it was demoted to sympathiser status within the FI. And in 2020, the organization became Japan Section again within the FI.
