= Zengakuren =

League of university students in Japan

- All-Japan Federation of Student Self-Government Associations
- 全日本学生自治会総連合
- Established: July 6, 1948; 78 years ago
- Type: Nationwide student federation
- Location: Japan
- Key people: Teruo Takei (first chairman)
- Affiliations: Japan Communist Party (1949–1960); Japanese New Left (1960–present)

Zengakuren is a league of university student associations founded in 1948 in Japan. The word Zengakuren (全学連) is an abridgement of Zen Nihon Gakusei Jichikai Sō Rengō (全日本学生自治会総連合) which literally means "All-Japan Federation of Student Self-Government Associations". Notable for organizing protests and marches, Zengakuren has been involved in Japan's anti-Red Purge movement, the anti-military base movement, the Anpo protests against the U.S.-Japan Security Treaty, the 1968–1969 Japanese university protests, and the struggle against the construction of Narita Airport.

== History ==
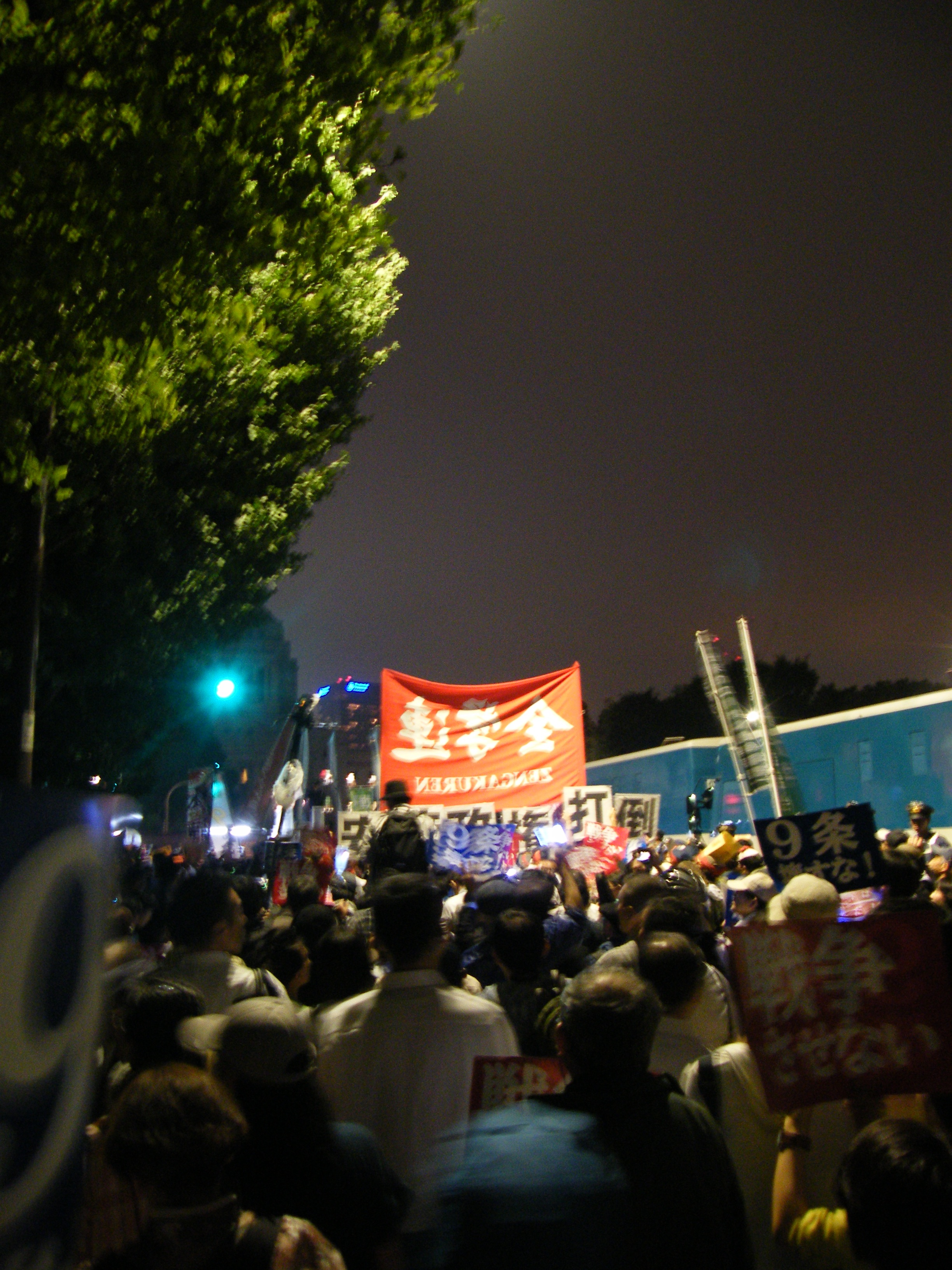
Demonstrators and police buses outside the Japanese National Diet on Friday September 18, 2015, during the debate in the House of Councillors shortly before the 2015 Japanese military legislation was passed in the early hours of September 19th. A Zengakuren banner is visible in the middle of the image.

Zengakuren emerged in the early postwar period as students at Japanese universities established self-governing associations (jichikai) in order to protest against perceived fascist remnants in the university system and to organize against proposed tuition hikes. All university students were automatically enrolled in these associations, and dues were automatically deducted from their tuition. In the wake of a failed general strike in 1947, the Japan Communist Party (JCP) stepped in to organize the separate university associations into a single nationwide organization. As a result of this extensive organizing effort, the formation of Zengakuren was officially announced on September 18, 1948. Teruo Takei, a Tokyo University student and member of the Japanese Communist Party, was the organization's first chairman. Towards the end of 1948, Zengakuren comprised almost 60% of Japan's total student population.

Over the course of the 1950s, Zengakuren took part in a number of "struggles" (tōsō) and protest movements, including the "Bloody May Day" protests against the terms of the San Francisco Peace Treaty on May 1, 1952, the struggle against the Anti-Subversive Activities Law from 1952 to 1953, the movement against nuclear testing after the Lucky Dragon Incident of 1954, the "Sunagawa Struggle" against the expansion of the United States' Tachikawa Air Base in 1955–1957, the 1958 movement against the Police Duties Bill, and the massive Anpo protests against the US-Japan Security Treaty in 1959–1960.

In the late 1950s, an "anti-Stalinist" (i.e. anti-JCP) faction within Zengakuren nicknamed "The Bund" (Bunto in Japanese) managed to secure control of Zengakuren, in part by rigging elections. Their control of the organization was strenuously opposed by the "anti-mainstream" pro-JCP faction. This began the process of numerous internal schisms within Zengakuren that would continue throughout the 1960s. Nevertheless, for the time being Zengakuren held together in order to mobilize its full power to try to stop the 1960 revision of the US–Japan Security Treaty. At the apex of its organizing power during the anti-Treaty protests in 1960, Zengakuren was able to count on around 250 jichikai at 110 schools, representing a total strength of around 290,000 students.

The first open splits within Zengakuren occurred in the immediate aftermath, as despondency at the failure of the anti-Treaty protests to stop the Treaty from being ratified led to numerous rounds of recriminations. Thereafter, the pro-JCP group split off from Zengakuren entirely to form a rival organization called "Zenjiren", and the remainder of Zengakuren split up into a large number of warring "sects" (sekuto), who would battle against each other at least as much as they battled against the police. Arming themselves with construction helmets painted in the colors of their various factions and large wooden staves they called "violence sticks" (gebabō, from the German Gewalt), they participated in a number of struggles throughout the 1960s and beyond, including the struggle against normalization of diplomatic relations with Korea in 1965, protests against the docking in Japan of US Navy nuclear-powered submarines and aircraft carriers, anti–Vietnam War protests, the university struggles of 1968–69, and the Sanrizuka Struggle against the construction of Narita Airport from 1968 into the mid-1980s.

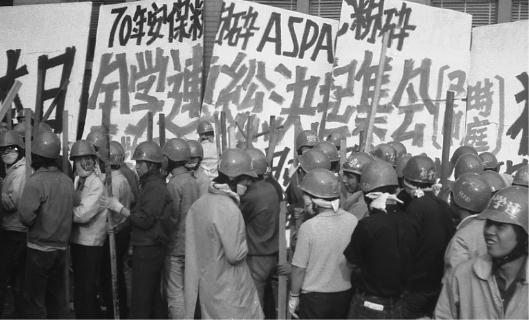
Zengakuren protestors in Tokyo, 1968

Although dozens of rival sects emerged over the course of the 1960s, three major groupings occurred:

1. Minseidō: student groups affiliated with the Japan Communist Party
2. Sanpa Zengakuren: A "three-faction" (sanpa) alliance of groups critical of the JCP: the Second Bund, Kaihō-ha, and Chūkaku-ha
3. Kakumaru-ha: The "Revolutionary Marxist Faction" of the Japan Revolutionary Communist League, it fought murderous battles with the Sanpa groups, even as it also opposed the JCP

By the end of the 1960s, there were several different factions claiming the mantle of the name "Zengakuren". Several different groups still claim this title today, and remain active, although their numbers have dwindled greatly since their heyday in the 1950s and 1960s.

== Current status ==
As of 1999, there were said to be five Zengakuren factions:

- Japan Revolutionary Communist League (Revolutionary Marxist Faction)
- Japanese Communist Party (Democratic Youth League of Japan)
- Revolutionary Communist League, National Committee
- Revolutionary Workers Association (Socialist Party Liberation Faction)
- Revolutionary Workers Association (Liberation Faction)

In the late 2010s, Zengakuren (Japanese Communist Party faction) was inactive.

== Sources ==
=== Works cited ===
- Kapur, Nick (2018). Japan at the Crossroads: Conflict and Compromise after Anpo. Cambridge, Massachusetts: Harvard University Press. ISBN 978-0-6749-8442-4.
