= 1977 Bangladesh Air Force mutiny =

Failed Bangladeshi Air Force mutiny of 1977

- Several dead airmen on the airport tarmac after the mutiny has been put down
Date	2 October 1977
Location	Dhaka Airport, Dhaka Division, Bangladesh
Result	Defeat of the mutineers: Sergeant Afsar is arrested and later executed; Beginning of the 1977 Bangladesh mass executions; Over 1,000 soldiers and airmen are executed for allegedly taking part in the failed coups d'état

Belligerents
Government of Bangladesh; Ministry of Defence; Bangladesh Armed Forces; Bangladesh Army; 46th Independent Infantry Brigade; 9th Infantry Division; Bangladesh Air Force	Opposition to Ziaur Rahman; Bangladesh Air Force mutineers; (Bangladesh) Army Signals Corps mutineers; JaSaD sympathizers; Communist Party of East Bengal	Non-aligned: Japanese Red Army

Commanders and leaders
(Bangladesh) Ziaur Rahman (Bangladesh) A. G. Mahmud (Bangladesh) S. H. Rumi	(Bangladesh) Afsar Ali Khan (executed) (Bangladesh) Sheikh Abdul Latif	Osamu Maruoka

Casualties and losses
10 killed	20 killed 60 captured	None

The 1977 Bangladesh Air Force mutiny was an attempted coup staged on 2 October 1977 by members of Bangladesh Air Force and the Signal Corps of Bangladesh Army, which took place while negotiations were ongoing between the Bangladesh government and the Japanese Red Army, who had hijacked a plane and diverted it to Dhaka airport. The mutiny was led by Sergeant Afsar Ali Khan of the air force, who was a member of the Communist Party of East Bengal.

== Background ==
=== Anwar Sadat's warning ===
On 25 September 1977, President Ziaur Rahman went to Cairo, Egypt, to obtain the support of Egypt and the Arab League in securing Bangladesh's place in the UN Security Council. During the meeting, Egyptian president Anwar Sadat informed Zia that the Egyptian intelligence services had uncovered a plot in the armed forces to overthrow Zia and install a Marxist government. Those involved in the plot were enlisted troops and non-commissioned officers, allegedly involved with the Jatiya Samajtantrik Dal (National Socialist Party) and Communist Party. President Sadat indicated that the Soviet Union and Libya may have been involved in the plot. The conspirators planned to gun down Zia and other high-ranking military officers at the Air Force Day celebrations on 28 September. Upon returning to Dhaka on 27 September, Zia sent a handwritten note to Air Vice Marshal A.G. Mahmud, informing Mahmud of his inability to attend the Air Force Day celebrations.

=== Japan Air Lines Flight 472 Hijacking ===
The hijacking of Japan Air Lines Flight 472 occurred on 28 September 1977 when the aircraft, en route from Paris to Tokyo made a stopover in Mumbai. The hijacking occurred shortly after taking off from Mumbai by 5 hijackers belonging to the Hidaka Commando Unit of the Japanese Red Army (JRA), armed with automatic weapons, grenades and plastic explosives. The hijackers forced the aircraft to land at Dhaka airport. Zia put A.G. Mahmud in charge of the negotiations with the hijackers, who demanded the release of 9 imprisoned members of the JRA and the East Asia Anti-Japan Armed Front, another far left group. Furthermore, the hijackers demanded a ransom of US$6 million.

=== 30 September Bogra Mutiny ===
On 30 September, while the negotiations with the JRA hijackers were ongoing, a mutiny occurred in the city of Bogra. Enlisted soldiers of the 22 East Bengal Regiment killed two lieutenants and took the 93 Brigade commander and several of his officers hostage. The mutineers tried to incite soldiers of the 4 Horse, an armoured unit, but failed to garner their support. Subsequently, the mutineers looted several banks and shops in Bogra and released 17 former soldiers from the prison, who were imprisoned for their role in the 1976 Bogra mutiny.

The next day, the body of Lieutenant Hafizur Rahman was brought to Dhaka Cantonment for burial. While delivering the eulogy, the father of the slain officer claimed that the army failed to protect its officers from murderous and undisciplined soldiers. This accusation angered several enlisted men who were present at the graveyard. However, the situation was diffused by Brigadier M.A. Manzoor, who stated that the entire Bangladesh army could not be held responsible for the actions of a few soldiers.

== Events ==
=== The mutiny begins ===
During the early hours of 2 October, the uprising was set in motion. Sheikh Abdul Latif of the Army Field Signals Battalion set off a cracker and fired a single rifle shot. Upon hearing this prearranged signal, hundreds of soldiers rushed out of their barracks and looted the armouries. These soldiers were soon joined by several hundred airmen from the nearby Kurmitola air base. At around 2:40 am, the Central Ordnance Depot was stormed by about 700 soldiers and airmen, who looted the weapons and ammunition. In the cantonment, leaflets calling for continued armed revolution and the creation of an army without officers were spread among the troops.

=== Radio station is captured ===
At 5 am, the government radio station was occupied by a group of soldiers and airmen, who announced the formation of a 'revolutionary government'. Sergeant Afsar of the air force announced that a revolution had taken place, a revolutionary council had been formed to run the country and he was the head of the council. There are slightly different reports about the exact content of the mutineer's broadcast. The New York Times reported that "The rebel troops seized the Government radio early today and said 'A successful armed revolution has taken place with the help of the army, navy, air force, students and police'". Another source states "They announced that a revolution of the workers, peasants, students and people's army was underway and declared their coup a success".

There was a lieutenant present at the radio station, who was told to leave by the mutineers. He rushed to the nearby Intercontinental Hotel and telephoned for help. Subsequently, soldiers from the 9th Division arrived and retook the radio station.

=== Airport massacre ===
Foreign secretary Tabarak Hussein was involved in the negotiations with the JRA hijackers, alongside Air Vice Marshal A.G. Mahmud and Vice President Sattar. He described the following events in a meeting with American diplomat Edward Masters. Around 2 am on the morning of 2 October, Mahmud came down from the control tower to speak with one of the JRA prisoners brought in from Tokyo. He tried to get this prisoner to convince the hijackers to release more hostages. After this discussion, Mahmud returned to the control tower. Sometime later, gunfire was heard near the airport's main hangar. Upon hearing these gunshots, the air force officers present in the control tower fled, some changing into civilian clothes. The JRA hijackers were warned of the mutiny and told to shoot the mutineers if necessary, to protect themselves and their hostages. Hussein and Mahmood took refuge in a room near the office of the director general of civil aviation. Shortly after, a group of 4-5 enlisted men broke down the door and took Mahmud away. Hussein was unsure about whether these were mutineers or friendly forces. Regardless, Mahmud was unharmed.

The following air force officers were killed during the mutiny:

- Group Captain Raas Masood
- Group Captain Ansar Ahmad Chowdhury
- Wing Commander Anwar Sheikh
- Squadron Leader Matin
- Flight Lieutenant Shaukat Jan Chowdhury
- Flight Lieutenant Salhauddin
- Flying Officer Mahboobul Alam
- Flying Officer Aktaruzzaman
- Pilot Officer M.H Ansar
- Pilot Officer Nazrul Islam
- Pilot Officer Shariful Islam

Furthermore, the mutineers also killed Mohammed Enam, the 16-year-old son of Squadron Leader Sirajul Hoq. Zia and the Army Staff used the 46th (Dhaka) Brigade and 9th Infantry Division to suppress the uprising. One company, under Major Mostafa, cleared the airport terminal by 7 am, after killing at least 20 Air Force mutineers and taking 60 mutineers prisoner. Ten army soldiers were killed while fighting against the mutineers.

When the mutiny failed, Sergeant Afsar, the leader of the uprising, refused to flee, despite his friends urging him to. He stated that many people joined the uprising in his name and if he fled, it would be an act of betrayal. He was subsequently arrested.

== Aftermath ==
The mutiny was practically over by 8 am on 2 October, with only a negligible number of mutineers left. By the time the mutiny ended, the JRA had released two-thirds of their hostages and fled in their hijacked plane. Later that day, Zia spoke on the radio to reassure the country that everything was under control. He condemned the uprising, accusing the mutineers of 'terrorism' and 'crippling the armed forces'. The following day, Zia received a congratulatory message from Egyptian President Anwar Sadat for successfully putting down the insurrection. Zia was determined to punish those involved in the mutiny. He disbanded the 22 East Bengal Regiment for the 30 September Bogra mutiny and the following army units in Dhaka for the 2 October uprising:

- Army Field Signal Battalion
- Army Static Signal Battalion
- Corps of Signal Centre and School
- Army Supply and Transport Battalion

He even considered disbanding the Bangladesh Air Force for its role in the mutiny, in favour of an Army Aviation Wing. However, this plan did not go ahead. According to official records, 1143 troops and airmen were hanged in the two months after 9 October, when the trials began. Several hundred other men were given varying prison sentences. "It was the most brutal, devastating punishment exercise in the history of Bangladesh, carried out with utmost speed and total disregard for justice and the legal process", commented Anthony Mascarenhas.
