= Afsar Ali Khan =

Bangladeshi airman and mutiny leader

- আফসার আলী খান
- Died: Dhaka Central Jail
- Cause of death: Execution
- Military career
- Allegiance: Pakistan (before 1972); Bangladesh
- Branch: Bangladesh Air Force
- Rank: Sergeant
- Conflicts: 1977 Bangladesh Air Force mutiny (executed)

Afsar Ali Khan was an airman in the Bangladesh Air Force and communist activist who led the 1977 Bangladesh Air Force mutiny. Following the suppression of the uprising, Afsar was executed, along with over 1,000 other members of the armed forces.

== Military career and political activities ==
Afsar, who was stationed in Pakistan during the Bangladesh Liberation War, escaped to Bangladesh in 1972 via Afghanistan and India. Upon joining the Bangladesh Air Force, Afsar was put in charge of a mess, and was eventually promoted from corporal to sergeant.

While working in the air force, Afsar became involved with the Communist Party of East Bengal, and regularly attended political lessons on Marxist–Leninist theory. Afsar also held meetings with other pro-communist airmen in the barracks. Furthermore, Afsar established contact with JSD member Corporal Altaf, who was from the army.

Afsar's family and colleagues stated that he frequently gave whatever little money he had to the poor.

== 1977 Air Force Mutiny ==
During the early hours of 2 October 1977, several hundred members of the Bangladesh Air Force and Signal Corps of Bangladesh Army staged an insurrection against the government of Ziaur Rahman. This uprising took place while the government was negotiating with members of the Japanese Red Army, who had hijacked a plane and forced it to land at Dhaka airport. The mutineers killed 11 air force officers and 10 soldiers of the army during the course of the uprising.

In an interview with journalist Anwar Kabir, ex-chief of the Bangladesh Air Force A.G. Mahmud, claimed that Afsar forced many military personnel to participate in the uprising:

Firing blank shots in the air, he "hijacked" them [the military personnel] and brought them with him

An eyewitness claimed that he saw a group of air force officers being lined up against a wall to be executed by firing squad, on Afsar's orders. However, another mutineer intervened and asked Afsar to spare the officers, which Afsar agreed to.

By 5 am, the government radio station was captured by the mutineers, and Afsar announced that a revolution had taken place and declared himself head of state. However, the insurrection was put down by government loyalist troops by 8 am, and many mutineers fled. Despite other mutineers urging Afsar to flee, he refused, as he did not want to betray the captured mutineers.

== Imprisonment and execution ==
While imprisoned in Dhaka Central Jail, Afsar met Anwar Hossain, the younger brother of Lt. Colonel Abu Taher. When asked about the motives for the insurrection, Afsar stated that he was inspired by the events of 7 November 1975, and that many of the demands of the 12-point charter presented to Zia during that earlier uprising had not been implemented.
