= Haruo Wakō =

Japanese communist (1948–2023)

- 和光 晴生
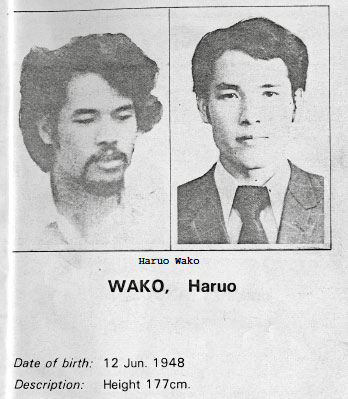
- Interpol mugshot
- Born: June 12, 1948; Shiogama, Miyagi, Japan
- Died: November 4, 2023 (aged 75); Osaka, Japan
- Education: Dropped out of Keio University
- Organization: Japanese Red Army
- Known for: 1974 French Embassy attack in The Hague, 1975 AIA building hostage crisis

Haruo Wakō (和光 晴生, Wakō Haruo; June 12, 1948 – November 4, 2023) was a Japanese communist militant, member of the Japanese Red Army (JRA).

Wakō attended Keio University, but dropped out in 1970. Later he worked for a time as an assistant for Kōji Wakamatsu's Wakamatsu Productions, a producer of leftist movies.

== Attacks ==
=== French Embassy attack ===
Haruo Wakō and two other members of the JRA (Junzo Okudaira and Jun Nishikawa) were directly involved in the seizure of the French Embassy in The Hague in 1974. The ambassador and ten other people were taken hostage. After lengthy negotiations, the hostages were freed in exchange for the release of the jailed JRA member Yatsuka Furuya, $300,000 and the use of a Boeing 707 aeroplane, which flew the hostage-takers to Syria. Syria did not consider hostage-taking for money revolutionary and forced them to give up their ransom which was passed on to the French embassy.

=== AIA building attack ===
In August 1975, Wakō and other members of the JRA seized the American Insurance Associates (AIA) building which housed several embassies, including the US Embassy in Kuala Lumpur, Malaysia, taking over 50 hostages. Both seizures resulted in the successful demand for release of six fellow members (including Jun Nishikawa) of the JRA from imprisonment in Japan and a flight to Libya. The hostages included the United States consul Robert Stebbins and the Swedish chargé d'affaires Fredrik Bergenstråhle and his secretary.

== Prison ==
In May 1997, Wakō was imprisoned with five other suspected JRA members in Lebanon on charges of forgery before four of them were deported to Jordan in March 2000, the fifth, Kozo Okamoto, was granted asylum for health reasons. As the Jordanian authorities refused to allow Wakō into Jordan, Wakō and the three other suspected JRA members were handed over to Japan to be tried on terrorism charges.

On March 23, 2005, a Japanese court, presided over by Judge Kunihiko Koma, sentenced Haruo Wakō to life in prison. The court dismissed prosecutors' arguments over the conspiracy charge.

== Death ==
Haruo Wakō died on November 4, 2023, at the age of 75.
