= 1974 French Embassy attack in The Hague =

Japanese Red Army siege in the Netherlands

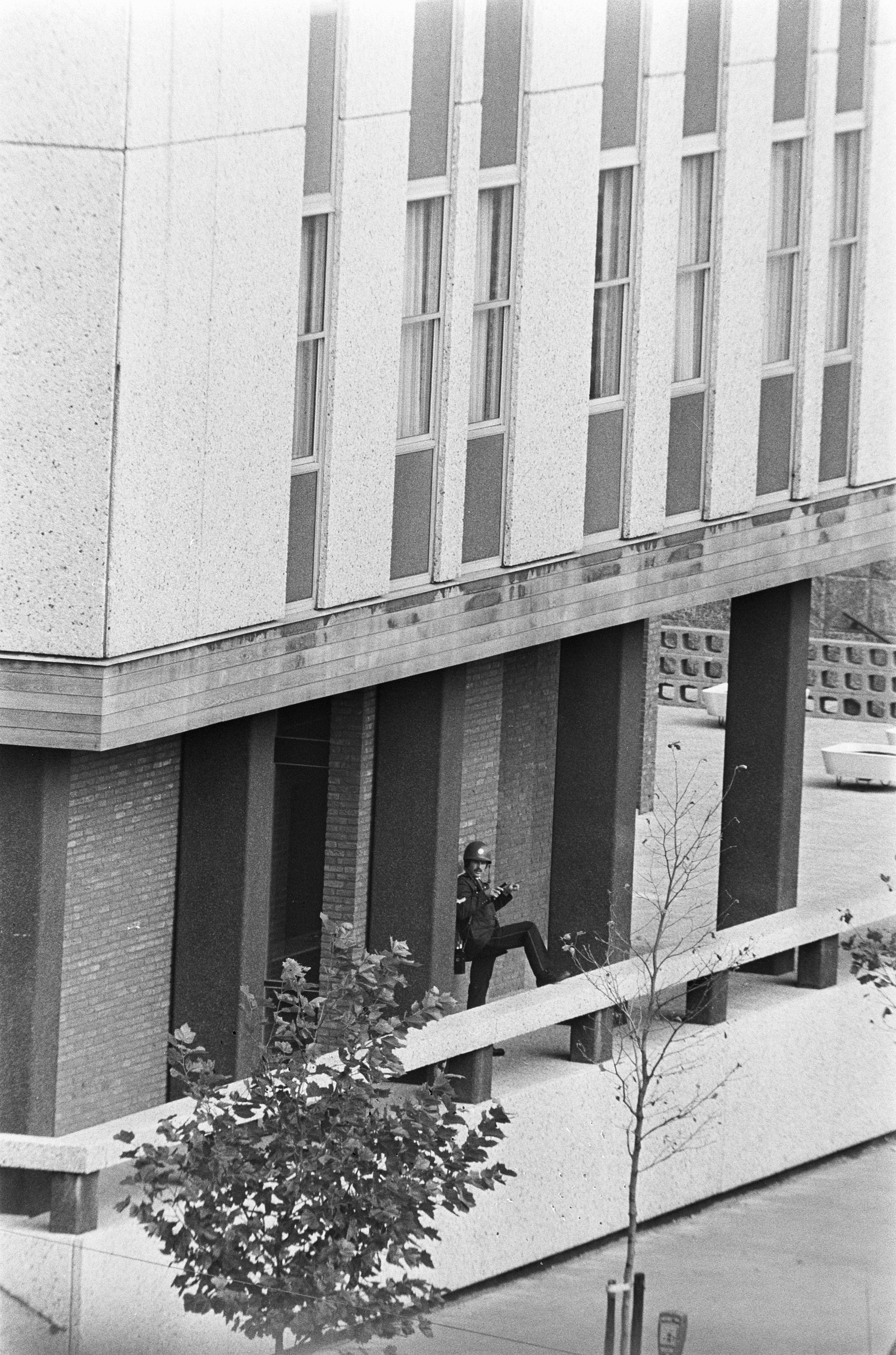
A helmeted policeman stands at the entrance of the French Embassy during the siege, 15 September 1974.

The 1974 French Embassy attack in The Hague was an attack and siege on the French Embassy in The Hague in the Netherlands starting on Friday 13 September 1974. Three members of the Japanese Red Army (JRA) stormed the embassy, demanding the release of their member Yatsuka Furuya. The ambassador and ten other people were taken hostage. The siege and negotiations lasted five days, resulting in the release of Furuya and the embassy hostages, and a safe flight out of the Netherlands for the terrorists. During the incident, a café in Paris was bombed which was linked to the embassy crisis.

== Background ==
The Japanese Red Army was a communist terrorist organisation dedicated to eliminating the Japanese government and monarchy and launching a worldwide revolution. The organisation carried out many attacks and assassinations in the 1970s, including the Lod Airport massacre in Tel Aviv two years earlier.

== Embassy attack ==
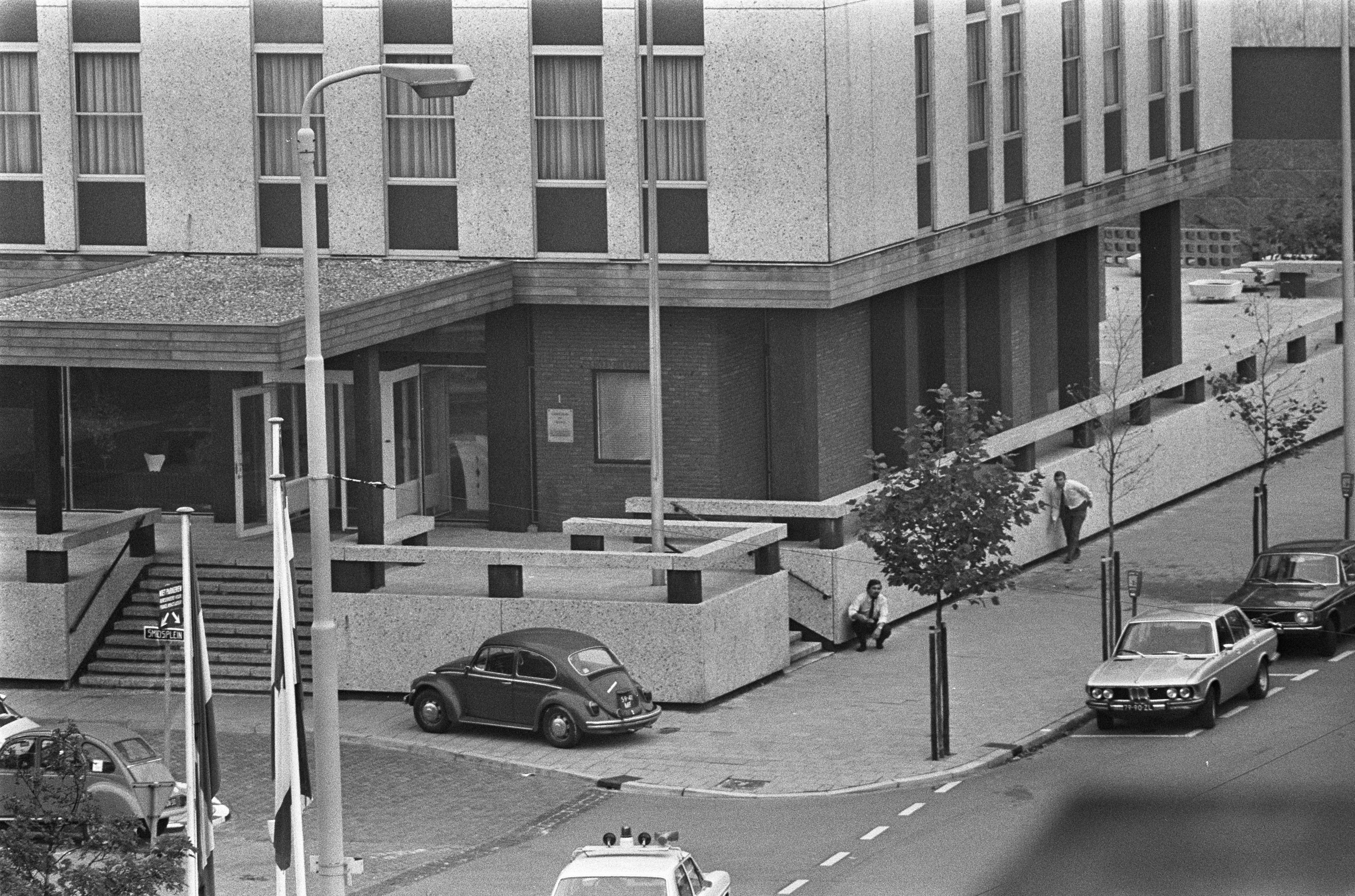
Police officers around the embassy on 15 September

Three Japanese Red Army members stormed the embassy on Friday 13 September 1974. A few minutes later, three Dutch police officers entered the embassy and were immediately caught under fire. Two police officers were seriously injured due to the gunfire and the other opened fire. One of them was policewoman Hanke Remmerswaal, who was shot in the back, puncturing a lung.

The Red Army demanded the release of their member Yoshiaki Yamada (also known as Yatsuka Furuya), one million dollars, as well as the use of a French aeroplane. Due to the position of the building in a central part of the city (Smidsplein), the Dutch authorities, in consultation with the Government of France, chose to negotiate for the release of the hostages instead of mounting a rescue operation.

The two female hostages were released after two days.

=== Paris café attack ===
Le Publicis Drugstore bombing
- Location: Saint‐Germain‐des‐Pres, Paris, France
- Date: 15 September 1974
- Attack type: Grenade attack
- Deaths: 2
- Injuries: 34
- Perpetrator: Popular Front for the Liberation of Palestine

On 15 September, a grenade was thrown into the Le Publicis Drugstore café in the Saint-Germain-des-Prés district in Paris. The attack killed two people and wounded 34, including two children who were maimed. The attack was linked to the still ongoing siege and hostage-taking at the French embassy in The Hague.

The Popular Front for the Liberation of Palestine (PFLP) claimed responsibility for the attack, and in 1996 a former member of the group, Carlos the Jackal, was charged with the attack. The hostage-taking by the PFLP-allied JRA in The Hague had also been orchestrated by Carlos according to prosecutors. The Paris attack was said to have finally pressured the French government into releasing the jailed JRA member. Carlos personally claimed responsibility for the attack in a 1979 interview with an Arab magazine, which he later denied.

=== End of siege ===
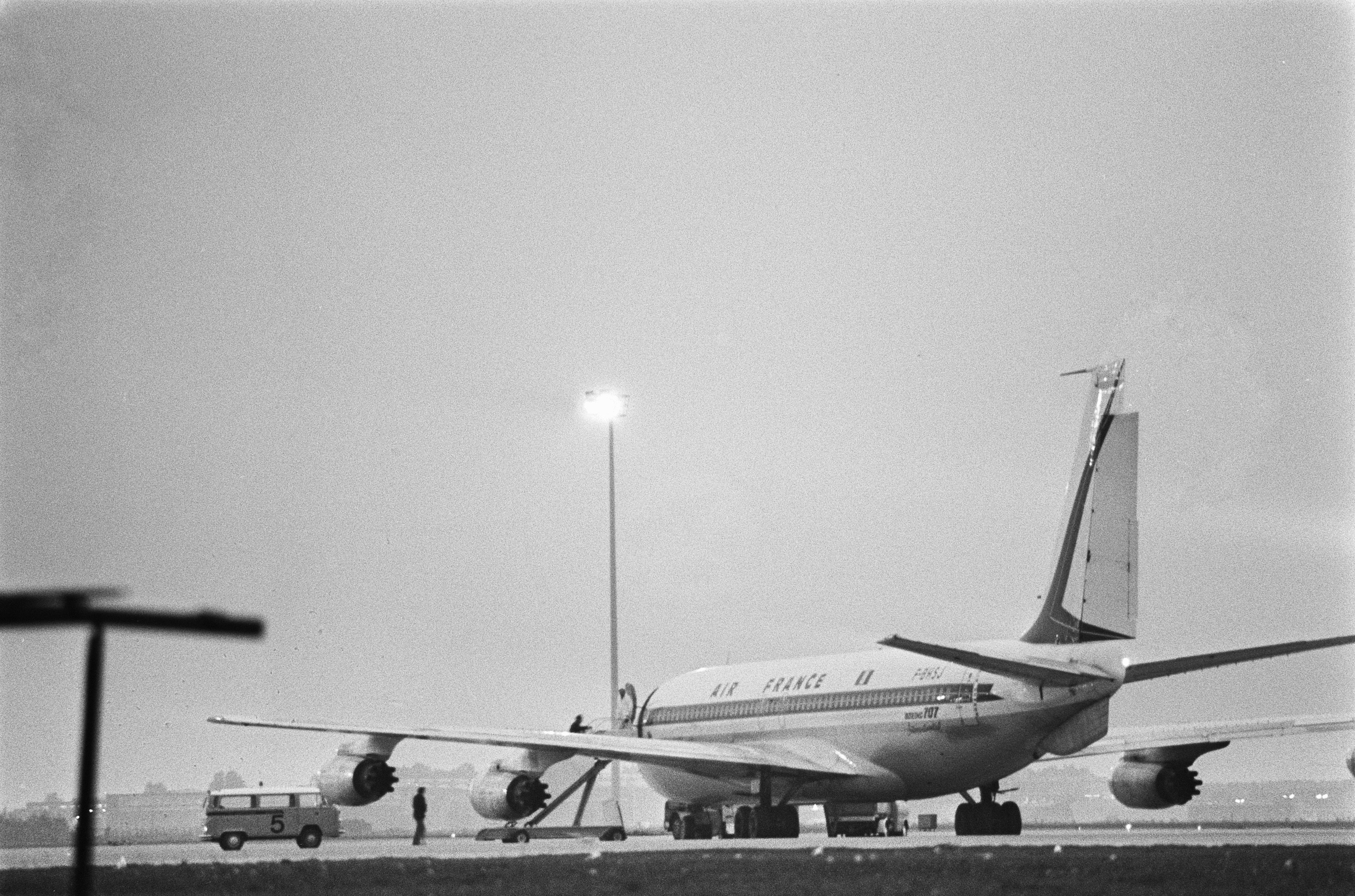
The Boeing 707 carrying the terrorists at Schiphol Airport on 17 September

After lengthy negotiations, around 10:00 am on Tuesday 17 September, France agreed, in return for the release of the hostages, to free Furuya from a French prison, US$300,000, in addition to a flight out of the Netherlands in an Air France-owned Boeing 707, which would later take off with the four terrorists and a Dutch-English crew piloted by Pim Sierks from Amsterdam's Schiphol Airport. The plane flew the hostage-takers to Aden, South Yemen for refueling, before bringing them to Damascus, Syria. They were then forced to give up their ransom and weapons, which were then returned to the French Embassy in Damascus.

According to Ambassador Jacques Senard, at least 20 shots were fired by the terrorists during the siege. Both the captives and Dutch authorities claimed that the kidnappers were highly trained; the ambassador called the group's leader a "skilled negotiator".

== Aftermath ==
The Government of France said on 18 September that its secret service would organise an international effort against the Japanese Red Army.

The Dutch Budget Day (Dutch: Prinsjesdag), where the reigning monarch addresses Parliament and proposes the next year's budget, was scheduled for 17 September. The traditional ride in the Golden Coach did not happen. Instead Queen Juliana was driven in a car, along a heavily protected route.

The JRA's next major activity was the August 1975 AIA building hostage crisis in Malaysia.

=== Trial of attackers ===
Kazue Yoshimura was arrested by Peruvian DIRCOTE agents in Lima on 25 May 1996 after alleged contacts with members of the Maoist Shining Path (SP) insurgency. The trace to her arrest was established after the 1995 Bucharest capture of Yukiko Ekita with a false Peruvian passport. She had supposedly intended on traveling to the coca-growing Huallaga Valley, the last stronghold of the diminished Peruvian Maoist insurgency as well as a drug-trafficking haven. According to the Peruvian Caretas magazine, she was aiming on helping establish a JRA presence in South America and may have even established contacts with Jun Nishikawa, another JRA operative later captured in Bolivia. Yoshimura was later deported to Japan by the government of Alberto Fujimori (a Japanese Peruvian), who stated that there was no proof against her despite the overwhelming intelligence data. The move was allegedly the result of pressure from Japanese authorities. In December 1997, Yoshimura was sentenced to two and half years imprisonment for passport forgery.

Two of the three members who allegedly attacked the embassy, Haruo Wakō and Nishikawa were detained and extradited to Japan, where they were later imprisoned. The other member, Junzō Okudaira, is still at large. Fusaku Shigenobu was captured by the Japanese police on 8 November 2000, after many years on the run. She was found guilty of her involvement in the attack and sentenced in 2006 to 20 years in prison. She was released in 2022.

Carlos the Jackal faced trial for the Paris café attack in 2017, and was given a third life sentence. During the trial he claimed that "no one in the Palestinian resistance has executed more people than I have," and claimed responsibility for a total of about 80 killings. It is thought he bombed the café to put more pressure on the French government into the JRA's demands in Netherlands. Carlos had already been imprisoned since 1996 for other international terrorist activities.

== In popular culture ==
This event was featured in the 2010 biopic miniseries Carlos about the terrorist Carlos the Jackal. In the film The Assignment the attack is fictionalized as one Carlos launched specifically to kill a CIA agent who he recognized incidentally while at the cafe there, disconnected from the French Embassy attack.

== Gallery ==
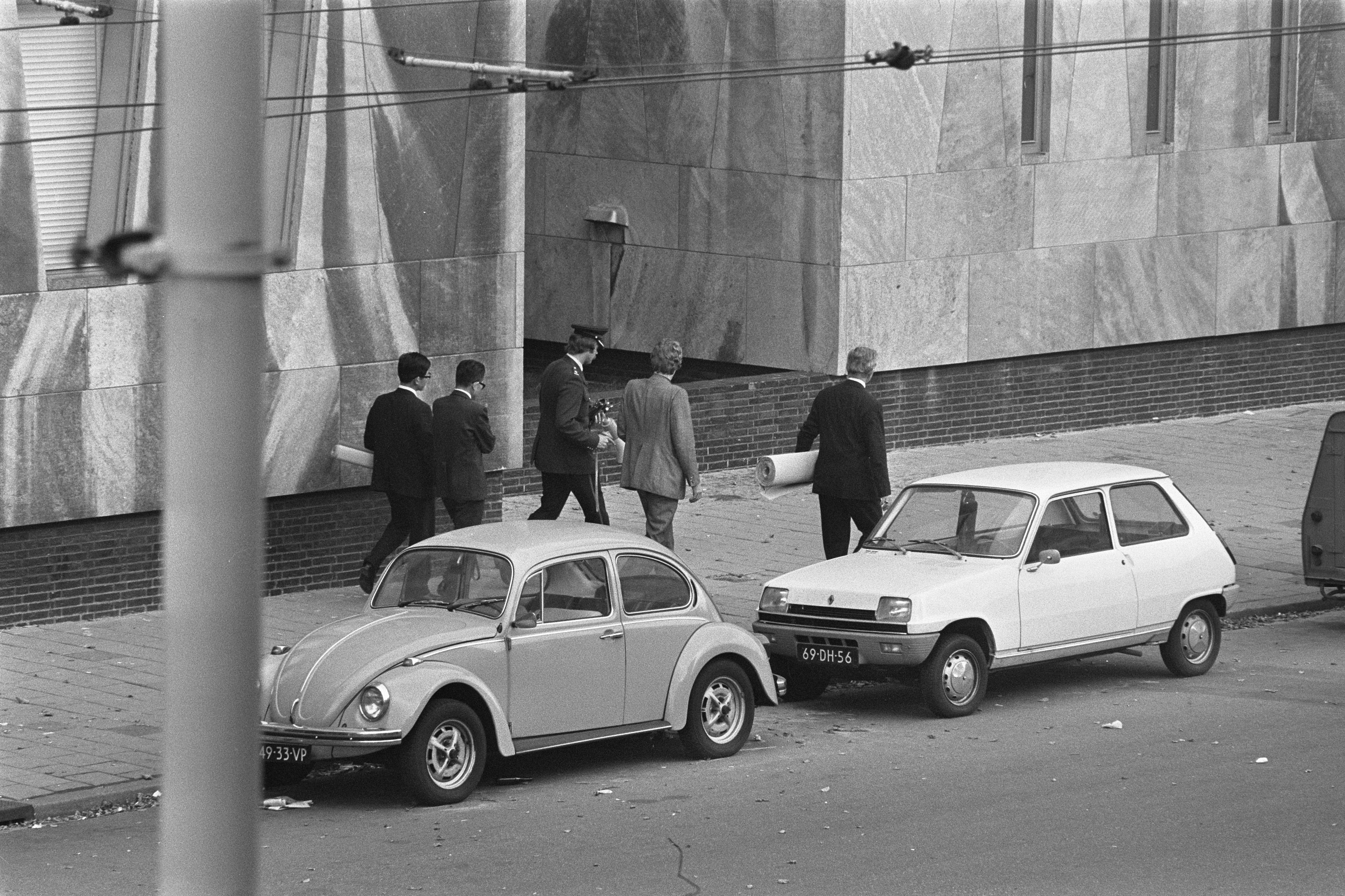
Japanese officials walking with Dutch detectives

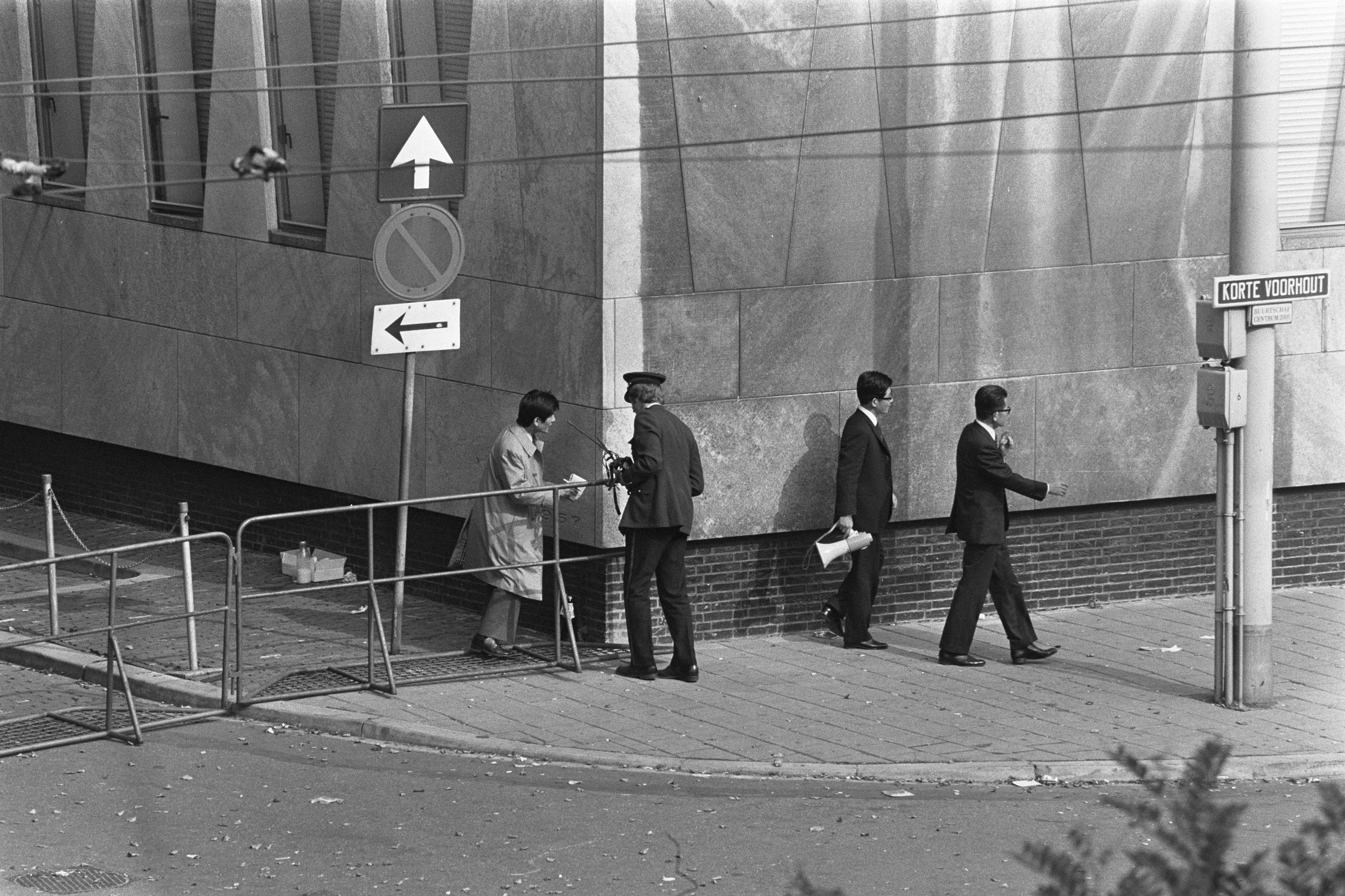
Members of the Japanese embassy attempting to contact the terrorists

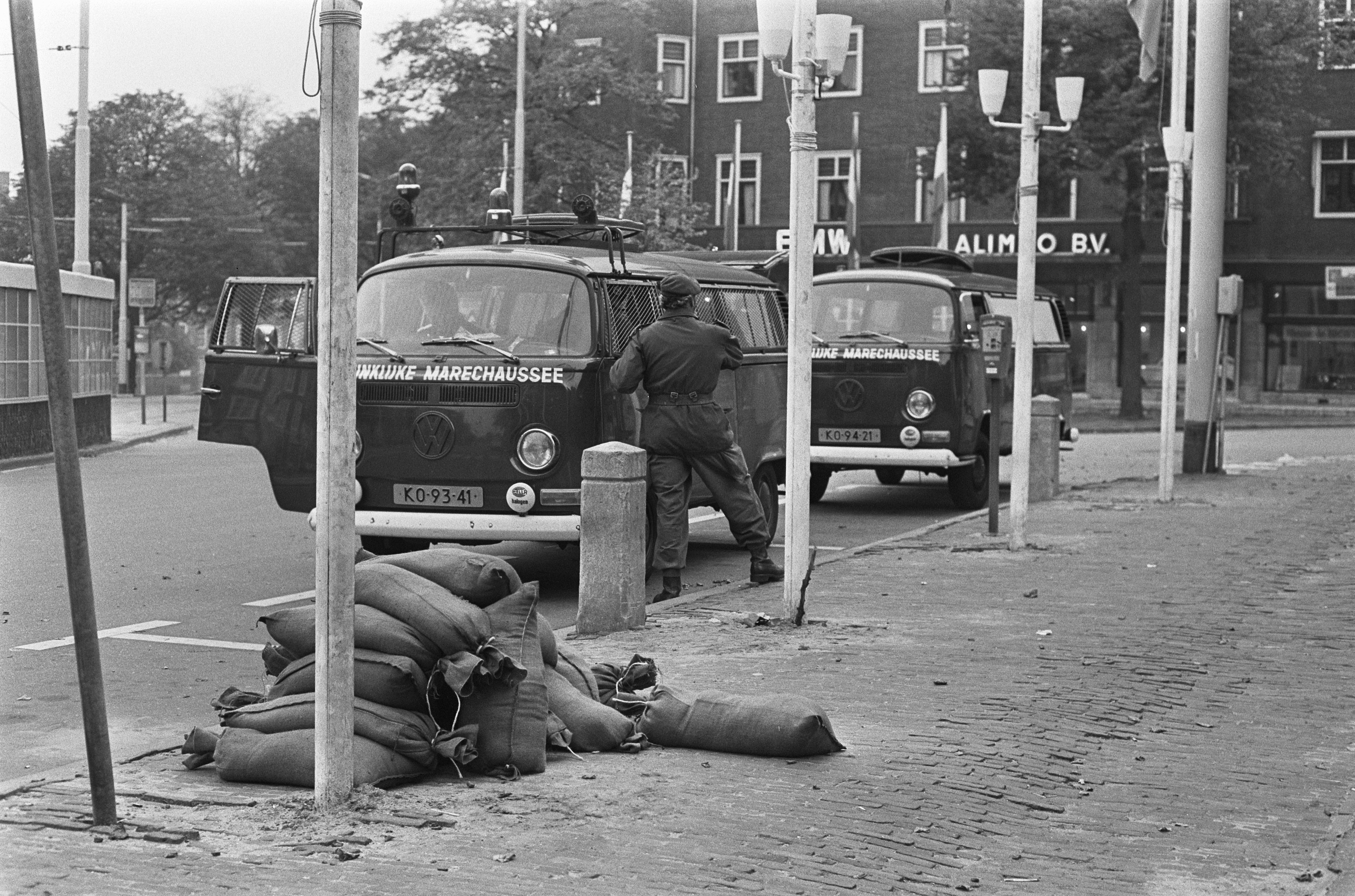
Two vans of the Royal Marechaussee

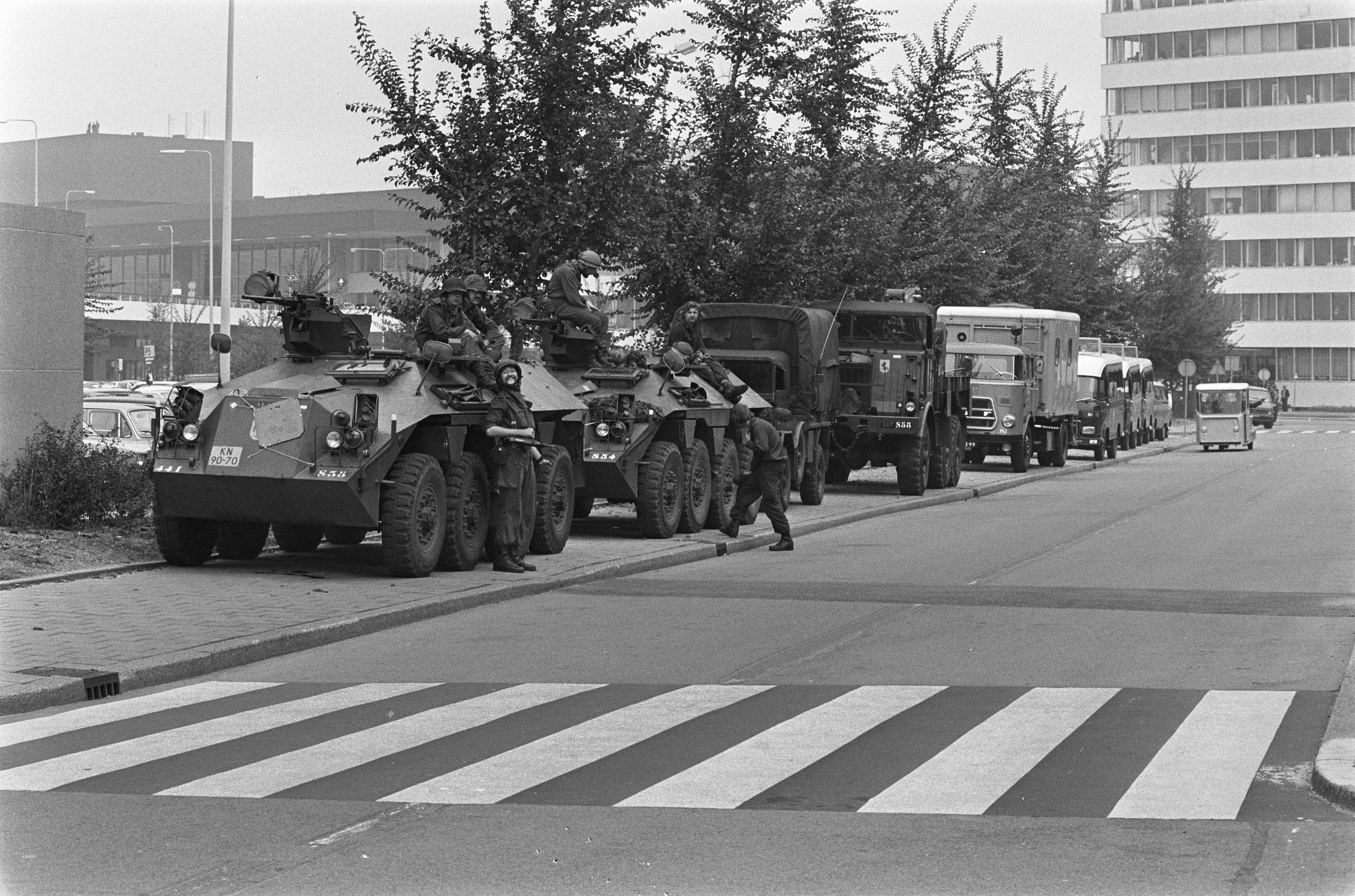
Dutch military vehicles on high alert at Schiphol airport after the siege's end

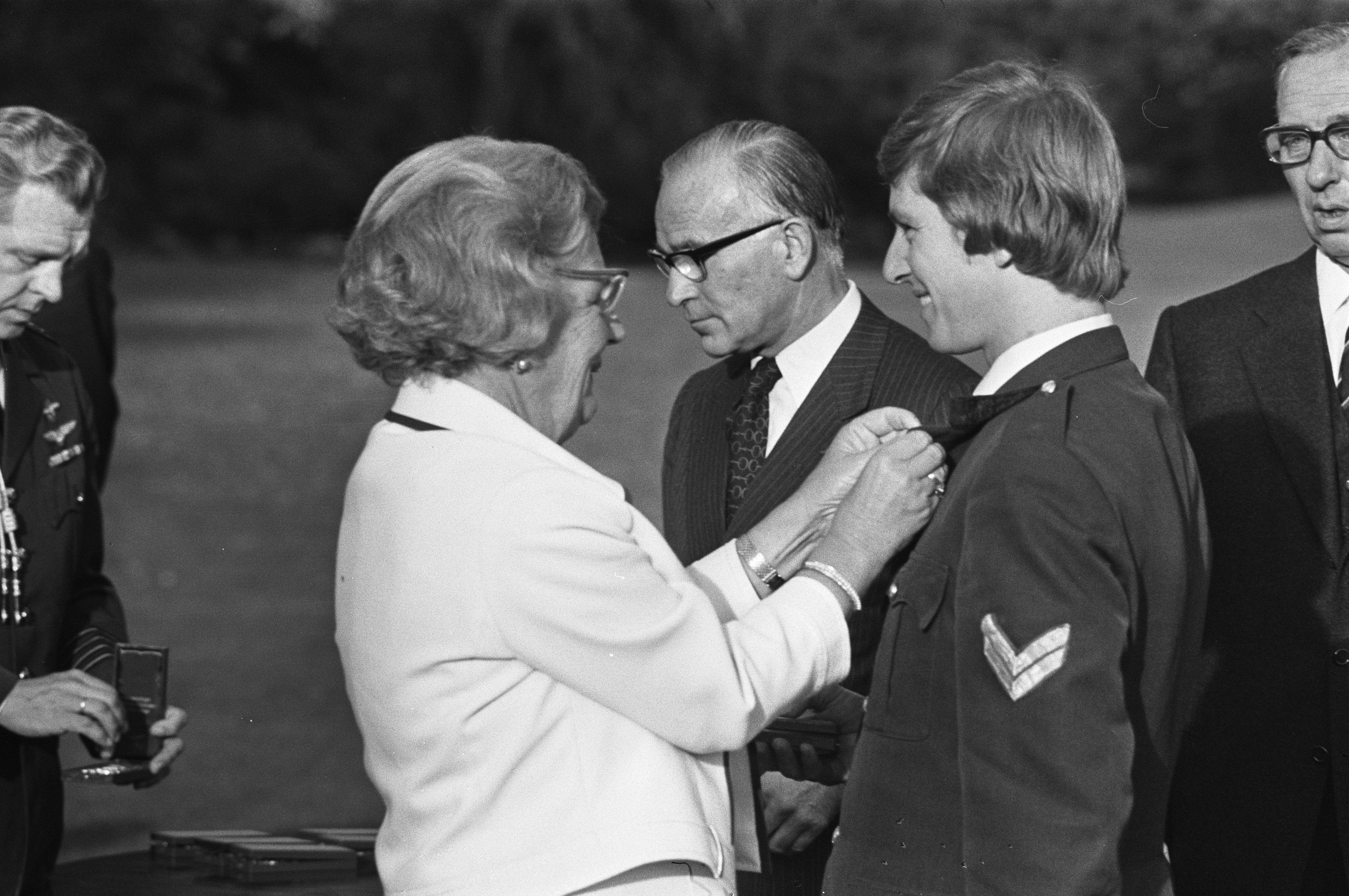
Queen Juliana decorating one of the injured police agents
