= Communist terrorism =

Communist terrorism is terrorism perpetrated by individuals or groups which adhere to communism and ideologies related to it, such as Marxism–Leninism, Maoism, Stalinism, and Trotskyism. Historically, communist terrorism has sometimes taken the form of state terrorism, supported by communist states such as the Soviet Union, China, North Korea, and Democratic Kampuchea. In addition, non-state actors such as the Red Brigades, the Front Line, the Red Army Faction, and the Viet Cong have also engaged in communist use of terror. These groups hope to inspire the masses to rise up and start a revolution to overthrow existing political and economic systems. This form of terrorism can sometimes be called red terrorism or left-wing terrorism.

== History ==
In the 1930s, the term "communist terrorism" was used by the Nazi Party in Germany as part of a propaganda campaign to spread fear of communism. The Nazis blamed communist terrorism for the Reichstag fire, which they used as an excuse to push through legislation removing personal freedom from German citizens. In the 1940s and 1950s, various Southeast Asian countries, such as the Philippines and Vietnam, witnessed the rise of communist groups engaging in terrorism. John Slocum claimed that communists in present-day Malaysia used terrorism to draw attention to their ideological beliefs, but Phillip Deery countered that the Malaysian insurgents were called communist terrorists only as part of a propaganda campaign.

In the 1960s, the Sino–Soviet split led to a marked increase in terrorist activity in the region. That decade also saw various terrorist groups commencing operations in Europe, Japan, and the Americas. Yonah Alexander deemed these groups Fighting Communist Organizations (FCOs), and says they rose out of the student union movement protesting against the Vietnam War. In Western Europe, these groups' actions were known as Euroterrorism. The founders of FCOs argued that violence was necessary to achieve their goals, and that peaceful protest was both ineffective and insufficient to attain them. In the 1970s, there were an estimated 50 Marxist or Leninist groups operating in Turkey, and an estimated 225 groups operating in Italy. Groups also began operations in Ireland and the United Kingdom. These groups were deemed a major threat by NATO and the Italian, German, and British governments. Communist terrorism did not enjoy full support from all ideologically sympathetic groups. The Italian Communist Party, for example, condemned such activity.

== Background ==
While Vladimir Lenin systematically denounced the terrorism practiced by the Socialist Revolutionaries, he also supported terror as a tool, and considered mass terror to be a strategic and efficient method for advancing revolutionary goals. According to Leon Trotsky, Lenin emphasized the absolute necessity of terror and as early as 1904, Lenin said, "The dictatorship of the proletariat is an absolutely meaningless expression without Jacobin coercion." In 1905, Lenin directed members of the St. Petersburg "Combat Committee" to commit acts of robbery, arson, and other terrorist acts.

Not all scholars agree on Lenin's position towards terrorism. Joan Witte contends that he opposed the practice except when it was wielded by the party and the Red Army after 1917. She also suggests that he opposed the use of terrorism as a mindless act but endorsed its use in order to advance the communist revolution. Chaliand and Blin contend that Lenin advocated mass terror but objected to disorderly, unorganized, or petty acts of terrorism. According to Richard Drake, Lenin had abandoned any reluctance to use terrorist tactics by 1917, believing that all resistance to communist revolution should be met with maximum force. Drake contends that the terrorist intent in Lenin's program was unmistakable, as acknowledged by Trotsky in his book Terrorism and Communism: a Reply, published in 1918. In the book, Trotsky provided an elaborate justification for the use of terror, stating "The man who repudiates terrorism in principle, i.e., repudiates measures of suppression and intimidation towards determined and armed counterrevolution, must reject all ideas of the political supremacy of the working class and its revolutionary dictatorship." Trotsky's justification largely rests on a criticism of the usage of the term "terrorism" to describe all political violence on behalf of the Left, but not equally vicious political violence carried out by liberal or reactionary factions. Scholars on the Left argue that while it is a matter of historical record that communist movements did at times employ violence, the label of "terrorism" is disproportionately used in Western media sources to refer to all political violence employed by the left, while similarly violent tactics employed by the United States and its allies remain unscrutinized.

== Examples ==
=== Bulgaria ===
The St Nedelya Church assault on 16 April 1925 was committed by a group from the Bulgarian Communist Party. They blew up the roof of the St Nedelya Church in Sofia, Bulgaria. 150 people were killed and around 500 were injured.

=== Cambodia ===
The Cambodian genocide committed by the Khmer Rouge, which led to the death of an estimated 1.7 million to 2.5 million people has been described as an act of terrorism by Joseph S. Tuman.

=== China ===
Benjamin A. Valentino has estimated that the atrocities committed by both the Nationalist government and the Chinese Communist Party during the Chinese Civil War resulted in the death of between 1.8 million and 3.5 million people between 1927 and 1949.

=== India ===
The Naxalite–Maoist insurgency was part of a conflict between left-wing extremist groups and the Indian government. The insurgency started after the 1967 Naxalbari uprising and the subsequent split of the Communist Party of India (Marxist) leading to the creation of a Marxist–Leninist faction. The faction splintered into various groups supportive of Maoist ideology, claiming to fight a rural rebellion and people's war against the government.

=== Japan ===
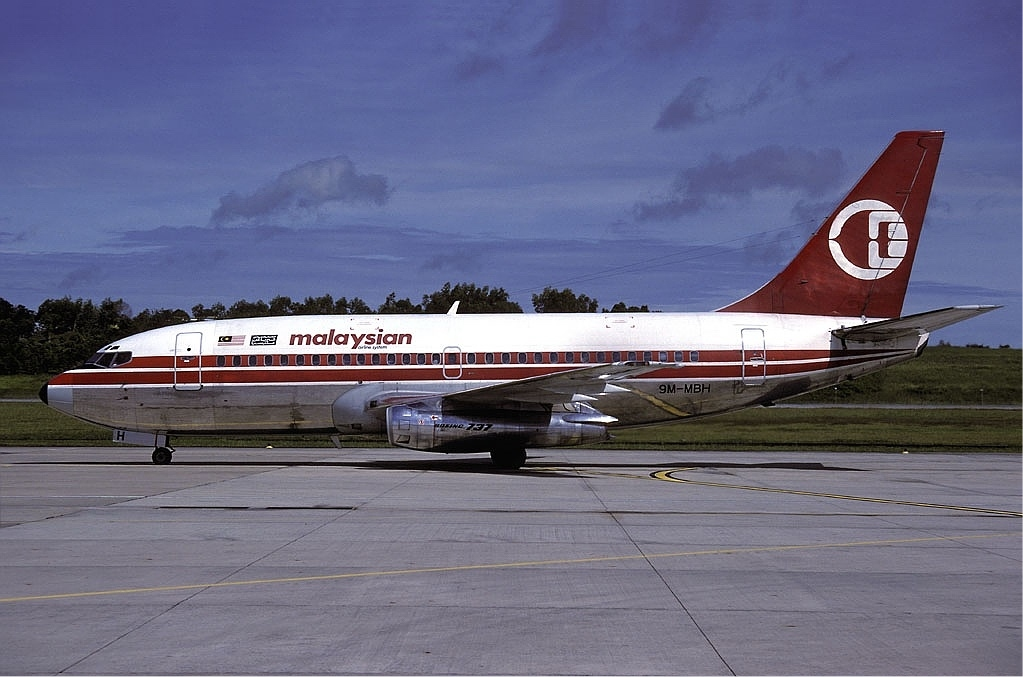
Malaysian Airline System Flight 653 was an example allegedly hijacked by JRA Militans

In the late 1960s, Japanese communist Fusako Shingenobu formed the militant Japanese Red Army terrorist group. Their goal was to start a worldwide communist revolution through the use of terrorism. They committed multiple embassy attacks, airplane hijackings, bombings and taking hostages. They were responsible for the 1972 Lod Airport Massacre, in which 26 people were killed and 79 injured. In 1988, members of the JRA detonated a car bomb outside of a USO recreational facility in Naples which killed 4 Italian civilians, 1 U.S. Servicewoman, and injured 15 other people.

Members of the JRA merged with members of the Revolutionary Left Faction to form the United Red Army, which became known for the Asama-Sansō incident, a weeklong standoff with the police after the group had murdered fourteen of its own members.

=== Peru ===
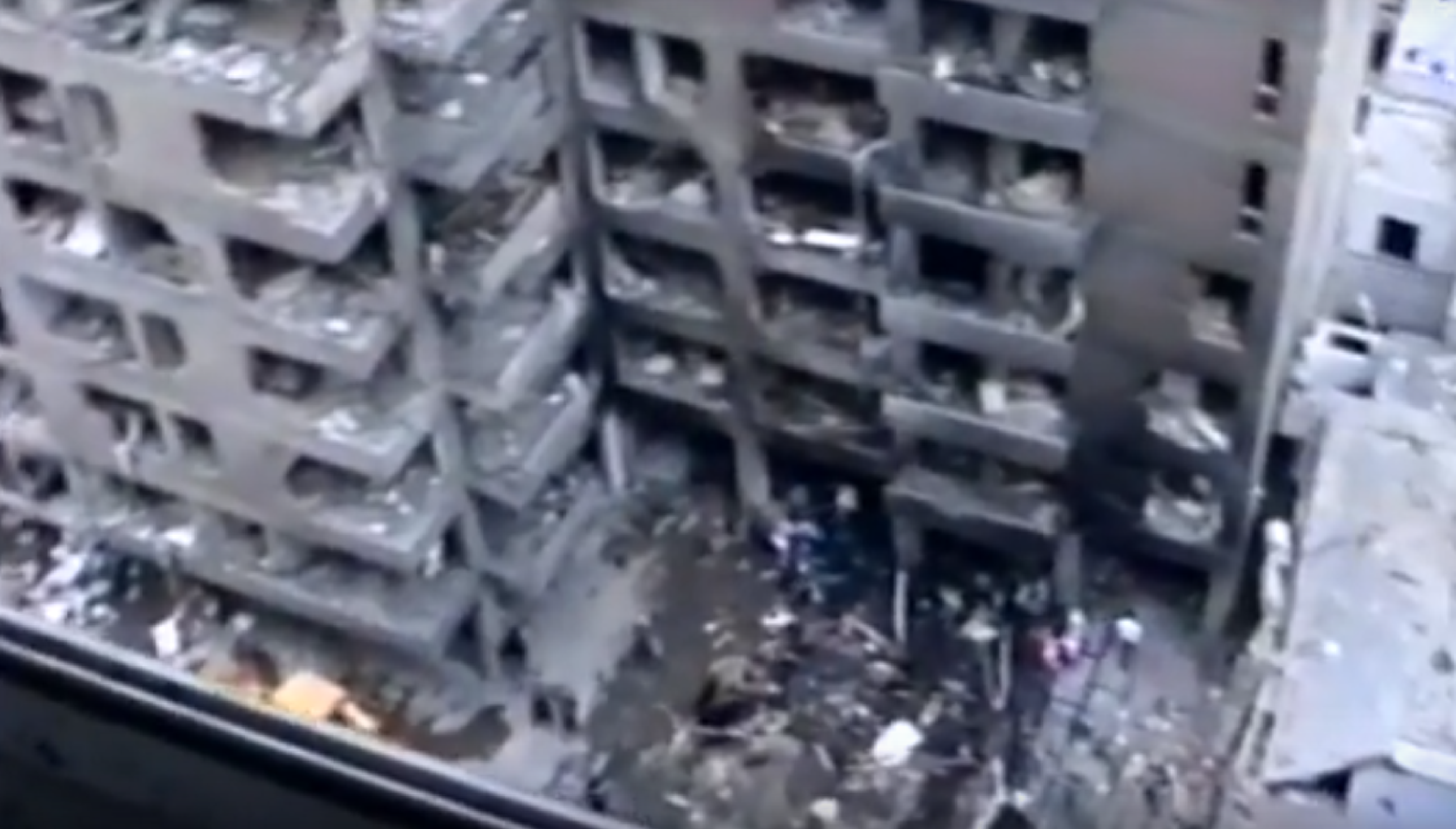
Shining Path was responsible for the 1992 Tarata Bombing in the business district of Lima, Peru. The bombing killed 25 people and injured 250 others.

Shining Path was founded in 1969 by Maoist philosophy professor Abimael Guzmán as a split from the Peruvian Communist Party. In 1980 when the Peruvian government held elections for the first time in 12 years, Shining Path rejected participation instead declaring a guerrilla war against the government, perpetrating "assassinations, bombings, beheadings and massacres", including the Tarata bombing and 1983 Lucanamarca massacre. Guzmán was arrested in 1992 and sentenced to life in prison on charges of aggravated terrorism and murder. Another communist terrorist group, Túpac Amaru Revolutionary Movement, gained notoriety after taking hostages at the Japanese Embassy of Peru which lead to a 126-day stand off with Peruvian authorities.

The Shining Path is regarded as a terrorist organization by Peru, Japan, the United States, the European Union, and Canada, all of whom consequently prohibit funding and other financial support to the group.

=== The Philippines ===
The New People's Army founded in 1969 has been described as the third largest terrorist group operating in the Philippines. The group carried out attacks between 1987 and 1992 before entering a hiatus. Between 2000 and 2006, they carried out an additional 42 attacks. The NPA is designated as a terrorist group by The Philippines, The United States, The European Union, and New Zealand.

=== Poland ===
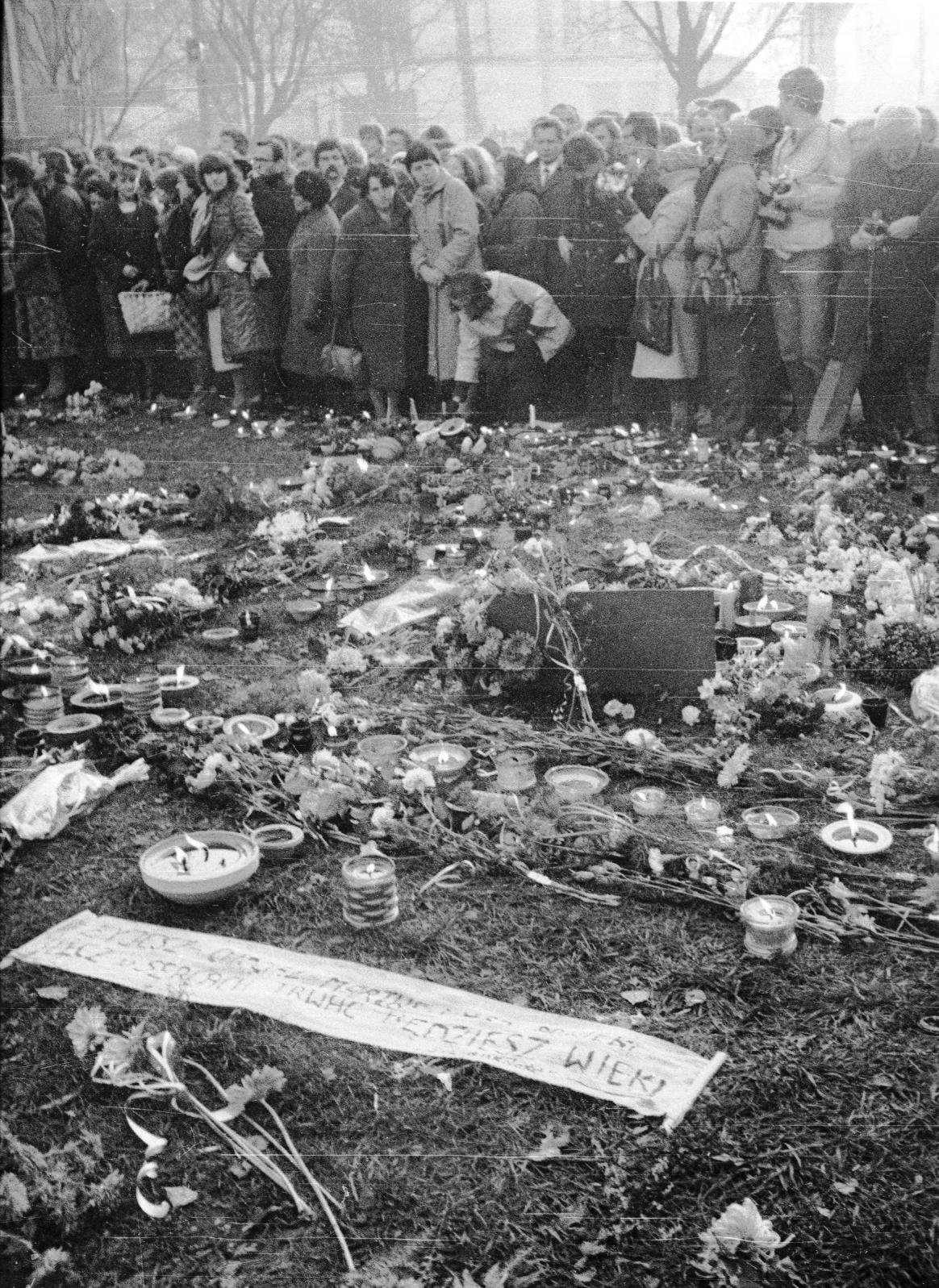
Father Jerzy's funeral was held at St. Stanislaus Kostka Church on 3 November 1984

The assassination of Jerzy Popiełuszko was committed by four secret agents from Security Service, who were disguised as the traffic police in 19 October 1984, to cause fear of the majority of Poles in order for them to stop attending mass in Poland. It involved not only homicide but kidnapping of Father Jerzy, as well as the assault and attempted murder of his driver, Waldemar Chrostowski.

=== Rhodesia ===
In Rhodesia (renamed Zimbabwe in 1980), during the Bush War of the 1970s, guerrillas operating in the country were considered communist terrorists by the government. The organisations in question received war materiels and financial support from numerous communist countries, and they also received training in several of those same countries, including the Soviet Union, China and Cuba. Both guerrilla armies involved in the war—the Zimbabwe People's Revolutionary Army (ZIPRA) of the Zimbabwe African People's Union (ZAPU), and the Zimbabwe African National Liberation Army (ZANLA) attached to the Zimbabwe African National Union (ZANU)—were initially based in the Lusaka area of Zambia, so as to be within striking distance of Rhodesia. ZANU and ZANLA moved their bases to Mozambique's Tete province around 1972, and based themselves there until the war's end in 1979. ZIPRA remained based in Zambia. In line with the Maoist ideology professed by its parent organisation, ZANU, ZANLA used Chinese Maoist tactics to great effect, politicising the rural population and hiding amongst the locals between strikes. While ZIPRA conducted similar operations to a lesser extent, most of its men made up a conventional-style army in Zambia, which was trained by Cuban and Soviet officers to eventually overtly invade Rhodesia and openly engage in combat against the Rhodesian Security Forces. This ultimately never happened.

=== Soviet Union ===
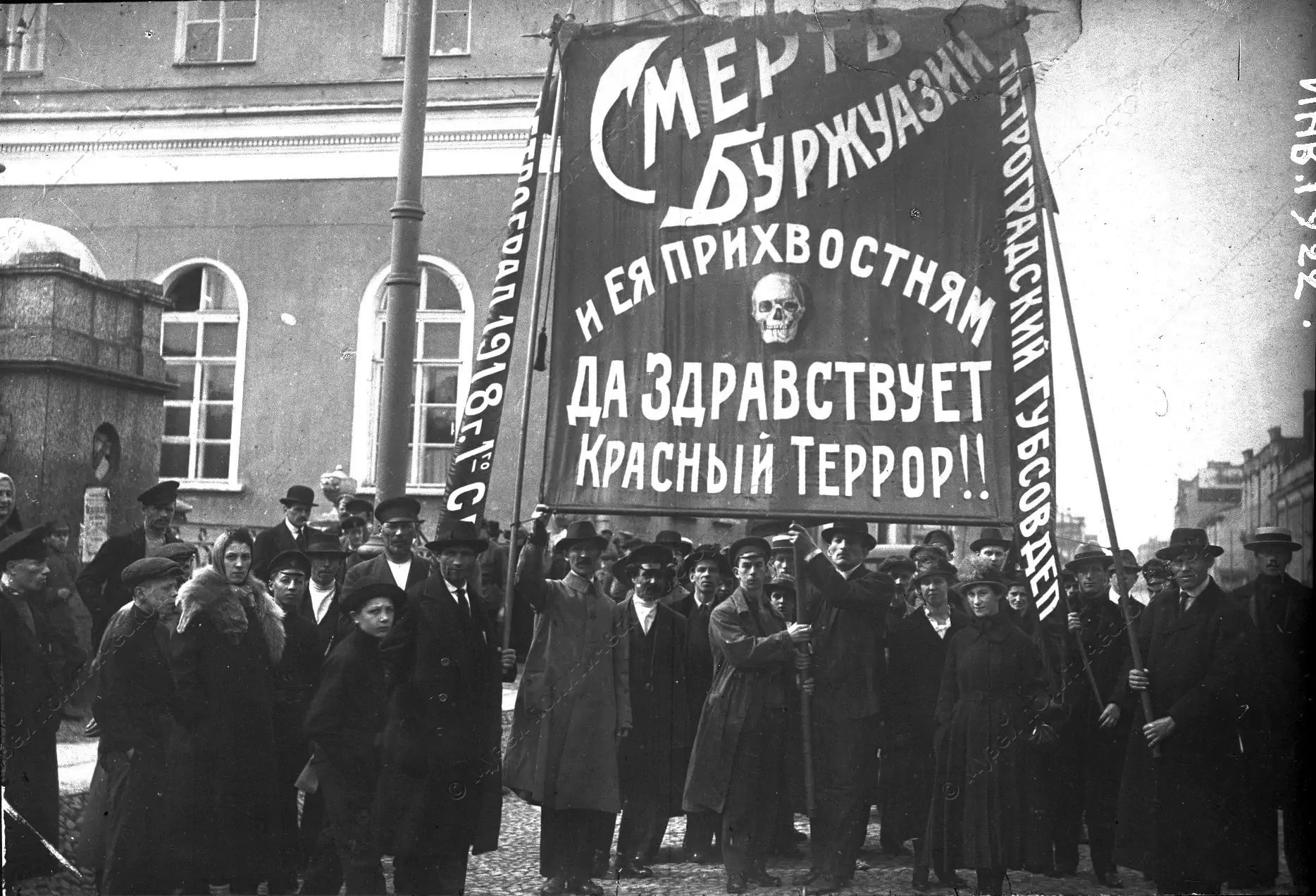
Bolshevik banner in 1918: "Death to the bourgeoisie and its lapdogs – Long live the Red Terror!!"

After the Russian Revolution in 1917, the use of terrorism to subdue people characterized the new communist regime. Historian Anna Geifman stated that this was "evident in the regime's very origins." An estimated 17,000 people died as a result of the initial campaign of violence known as the Red Terror. Lenin stated that his "Jacobian party would never reject terror, nor could it do so", referring to the Jacobian Reign of Terror of 1793–1794 as a model for the Bolshevik Red Terror. Felix Dzerzhinsky, founder of the Cheka (the Soviet secret police), widely employed terrorist tactics, especially against peasants who refused to surrender their grain to the government. Upon initiating the New Economic Policy (NEP) Lenin stated, "It is a mistake to think the NEP has put an end to terrorism. We shall return to terrorism, and it will be an economic terrorism".

=== South Africa ===
During the apartheid era in South Africa, the government under the Afrikaner National Party deemed the ANC and its military wing, Umkhonto we Sizwe, communist terrorists. As a result, a series of laws were introduced by the government, such as the Suppression of Communism Act, which defined and banned organizations and people that the government considered communist. In 1967 the government promulgated the Terrorism Act, which made terrorist acts a statutory crime and implemented indefinite detention against those who were captured.

=== Vietnam ===
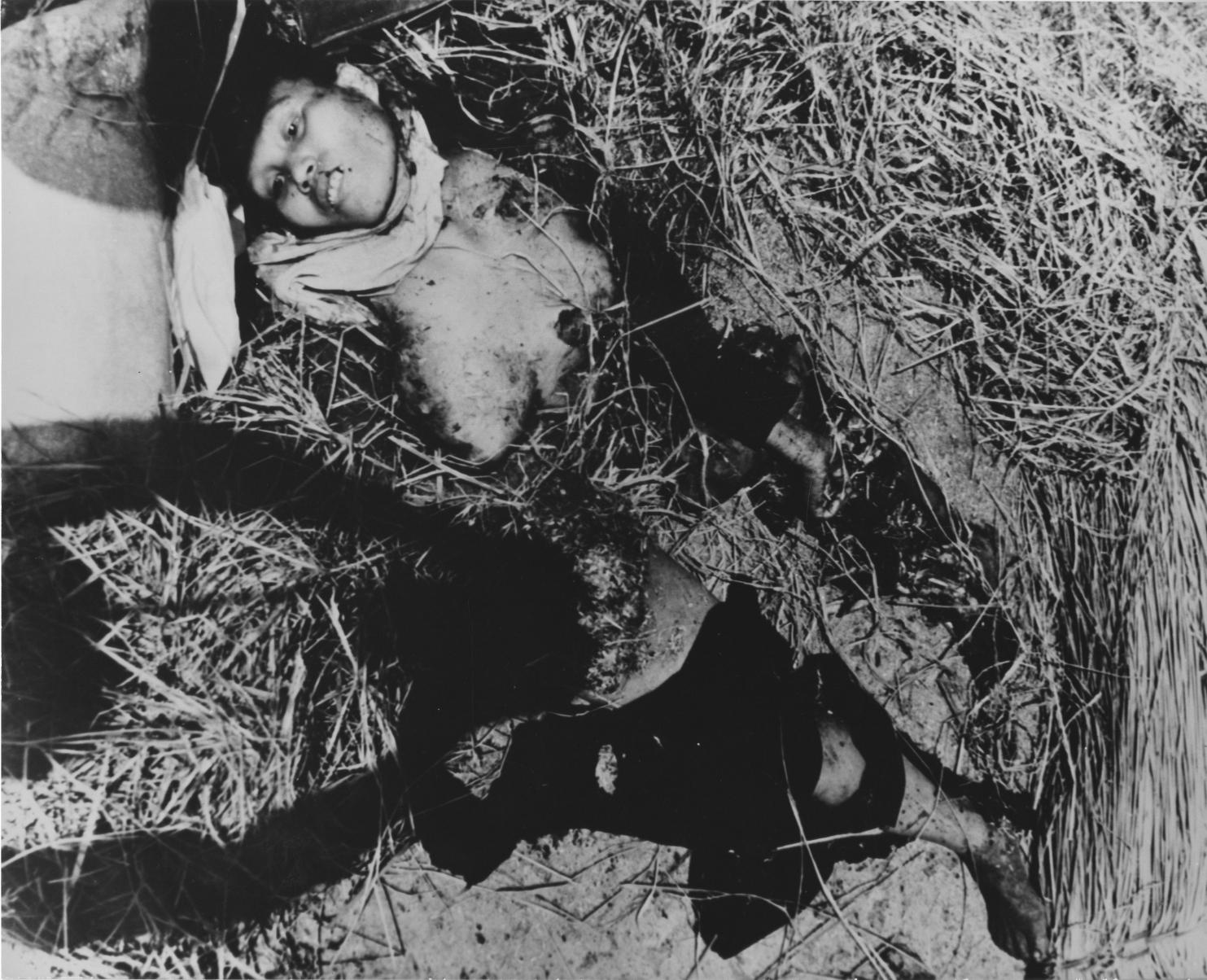
Victim of Viet Cong land mine explosion in Phu Yen

After World War II, the communist-led Viet Minh carried out murders and terror campaigns against non-communist political forces, before the full-blown war with France. The French Indochina War ended with the 1954 Geneva Conference, and the Viet Minh evolved into the Viet Cong (VC), which fought against both the South Vietnamese government and American forces. Although the armistice was signed, communist terrorist actions continued. These campaigns involved terrorism resulting in the deaths of thousands. Carol Winkler has written that in the 1950s, Viet Cong terrorism was rife in South Vietnam, with political leaders, provincial chiefs, teachers, nurses, doctors, and members of the military being targeted. Between 1965 and 1972, Viet Cong terrorists had killed over 33,000 people and abducted a further 57,000. Terrorist actions in Saigon were described by Nghia M. Vo as "long and murderous." In these campaigns, South Vietnamese prime minister Trần Văn Hương was the target of an assassination attempt; in 1964 alone, the Viet Cong carried out 19,000 attacks on civilian targets.

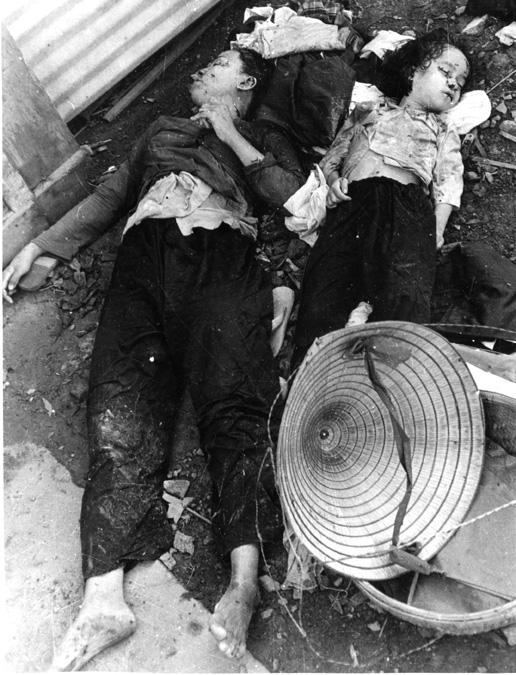
Vietnamese civilians killed during the 1968 Tet Offensive

Historian and former U.S. State Department analyst Douglas Pike has called the Massacre at Huế one of the worst communist terrorist actions of the Vietnam War. Estimates of the losses in the massacre have been cited as high as 6,000 dead. The United States Army recorded as killed "3800 killed in and around Huế, 2786 confirmed civilians massacred, 2226 civilians found in mass graves and 16 non Vietnamese civilians killed." While some historians have claimed that the majority of these deaths occurred as the result of US bombing in the fight to retake the city, the vast majority of the dead were found in mass graves outside the city. Benjamin A. Valentino has estimated a total death toll of between 45,000 and 80,000 people between 1954 and 1975 from VC terrorism.

Douglas Pike also described the Đắk Sơn massacre, in which the Viet Cong used flamethrowers against civilians in Đắk Sơn, killing 252, as a terrorist act. In May 1967, Tran Van-Luy reported to the World Health Organization "that over the previous 10 years Communist terrorists had destroyed 174 dispensaries, maternity homes and hospitals." Ami Pedahzur has written that "the overall volume and lethality of Viet Cong terrorism rivals or exceeds all but a handful (e.g. Algeria, Sri Lanka) of terrorist campaigns waged over the last third of the twentieth century," and that the VC used suicide terrorism as a form of propaganda of the deed. Arthur J. Dommen has written that the majority of those killed due to VC terrorism were civilians, caught in ambushes as they traveled on buses, and that the group burnt down villages and forcibly conscripted members.

== See also ==
- Left-wing terrorism
- Revolutionary terror
