= Pim Sierks =

Dutch airline pilot (1932–2024)

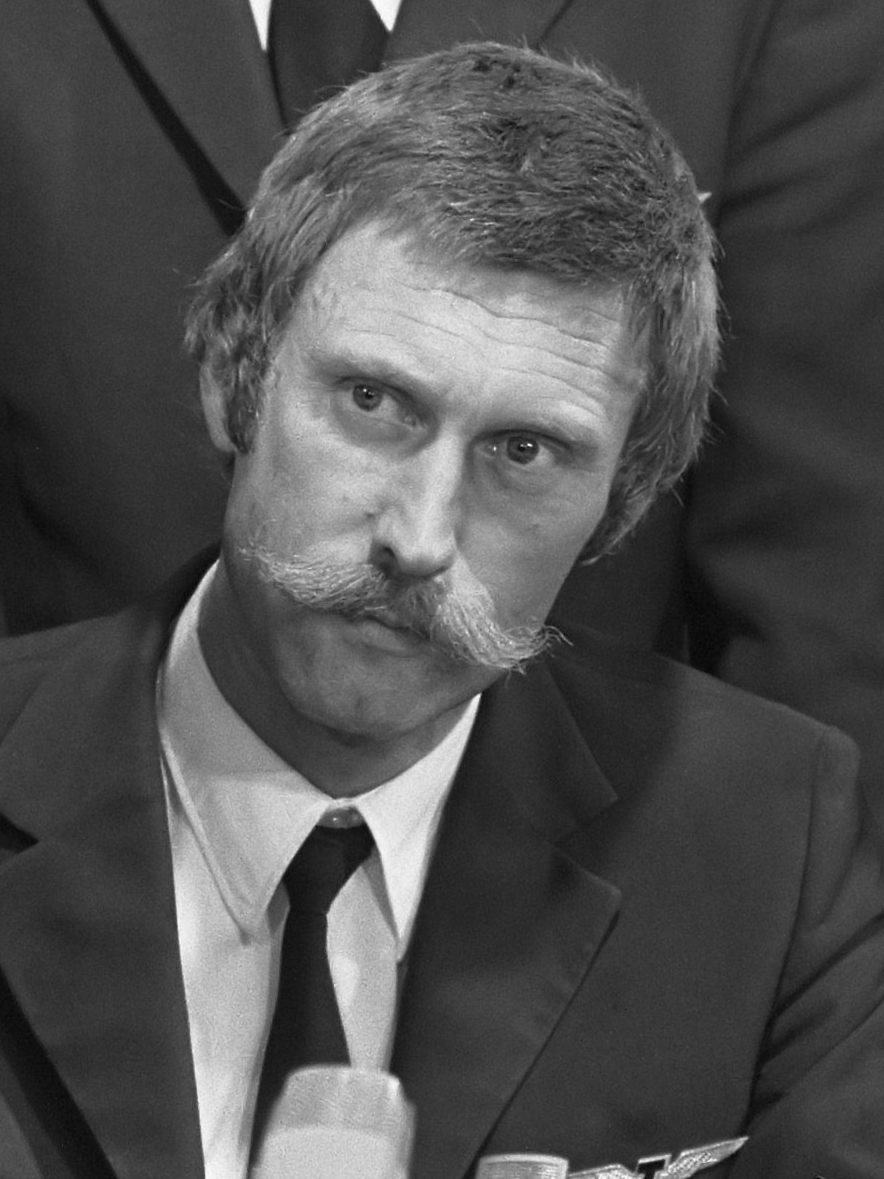
- Sierks In 1974
- Born: Henderikus Sierks; 10 March 1932; Haren, Groningen, Netherlands
- Died: 7 November 2024 (aged 92); Haslemere, Surrey, England
- Known for: Captained a Boeing 707 with hostage takers from the French Embassy attack in The Hague
- Honours: Knight Grand Cross of the Order of Orange-Nassau; Order of the Netherlands Lion; Airman's Cross
- Aviation career
- Air force: Royal Netherlands Air Force

Henderikus "Pim" Sierks (10 March 1932 – 7 November 2024) was a Dutch military and airline aviator who most notably captained a Boeing 707 full of hostages and hostage takers during the 1974 French Embassy attack in The Hague.

Sierks was a member of the Royal Netherlands Air Force for over 11 years and had flown many Dutch fighter jets. Upon retirement from the Air Force he worked as an airline pilot for Dutch airline Transavia.

== Early life and military career ==
Sierks was born on 10 March 1932 in Haren, Groningen in the Northern part of the Netherlands. He enrolled in the Royal Netherlands Air Force and was sent to Canada where he trained with the Royal Canadian Air Force. He trained there on the Airspeed Horsa, Auster AOP.6 and the Avro 626. Upon returning to the Netherlands Sierks was based at the Deelen Air Base then later at the Leeuwarden Air Base near Leeuwarden.

While in the Netherlands Sierks was assigned to the Hawker Hunter which he flew for the majority of his Air Force career.

== Involvement in the French Embassy attack ==
Three members of the Japanese Red Army (JRA) stormed the French Embassy in The Hague, on the orders to have a fellow JRA member released from the Netherlands. Other demands were for a significant amount of money and the use of a French airplane to escape. Fearing possible retaliation if not complied with, the French government sent a Boeing 707 to the Netherlands. However, there was not a crew to fly the 707 out of the Netherlands, so since Transavia was the only airline in The Netherlands at the time to fly Boeing aircraft French and Dutch officials asked for Transavia to provide a crew.

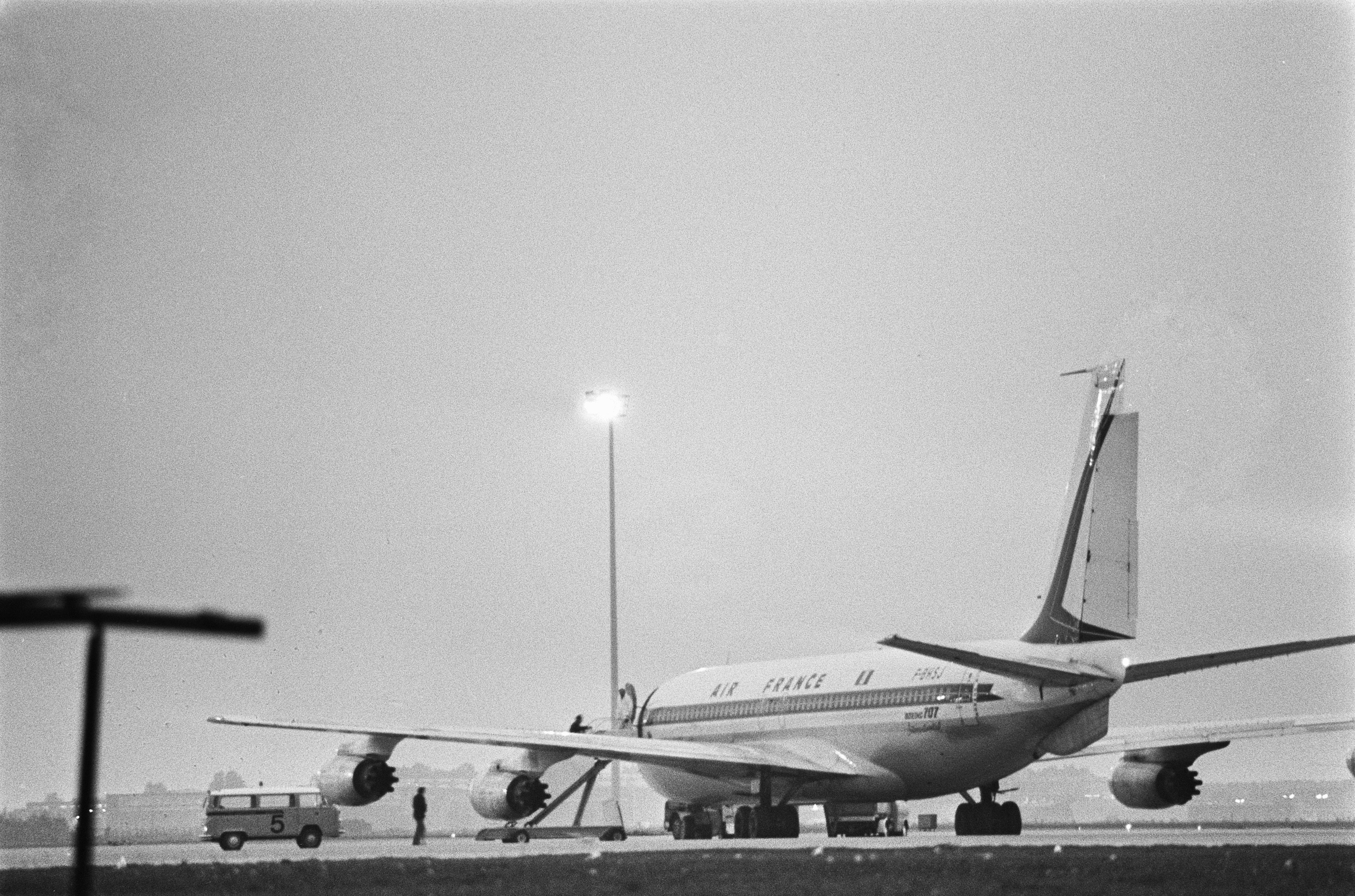
The Air France Boeing 707 parked at Amsterdam Airport Schiphol as the JRA members board (17 September 1974)

Sierks volunteered as well as first officer Ruud van der Zwaal to pilot the flight. Prior to the flight the JRA members had not announced where they wanted to be flown. So Sierks had a meeting with the JRA members inside the Embassy on the morning of 17 September. The meeting lasted 25 minutes, Sierks and the hostage takers made a deal that Sierks would not reveal the destination to anyone except his first officer in exchange for the safety of the aircraft and crew. The JRA members wanted to fly to Damascus, Syria however the 707 hadn’t have enough fuel to fly directly. So Aden, Yemen was selected as a refueling stop.

The 707 took off from Amsterdam Airport Schiphol bound for Aden International Airport. The aircraft refueled and took off from Aden within 30 minutes. The flight then flew from Aden to Damascus International Airport. Upon arrival in Damascus and in accordance to the agreement, the hostage takers surrendered their weapons to the crew and left the money as well. Upon landing in Damascus and the deplaning of the hostage takers Sierks and Van Der Zwaal returned the weapons and money to the French Embassy in Damascus.

== Legacy and death ==
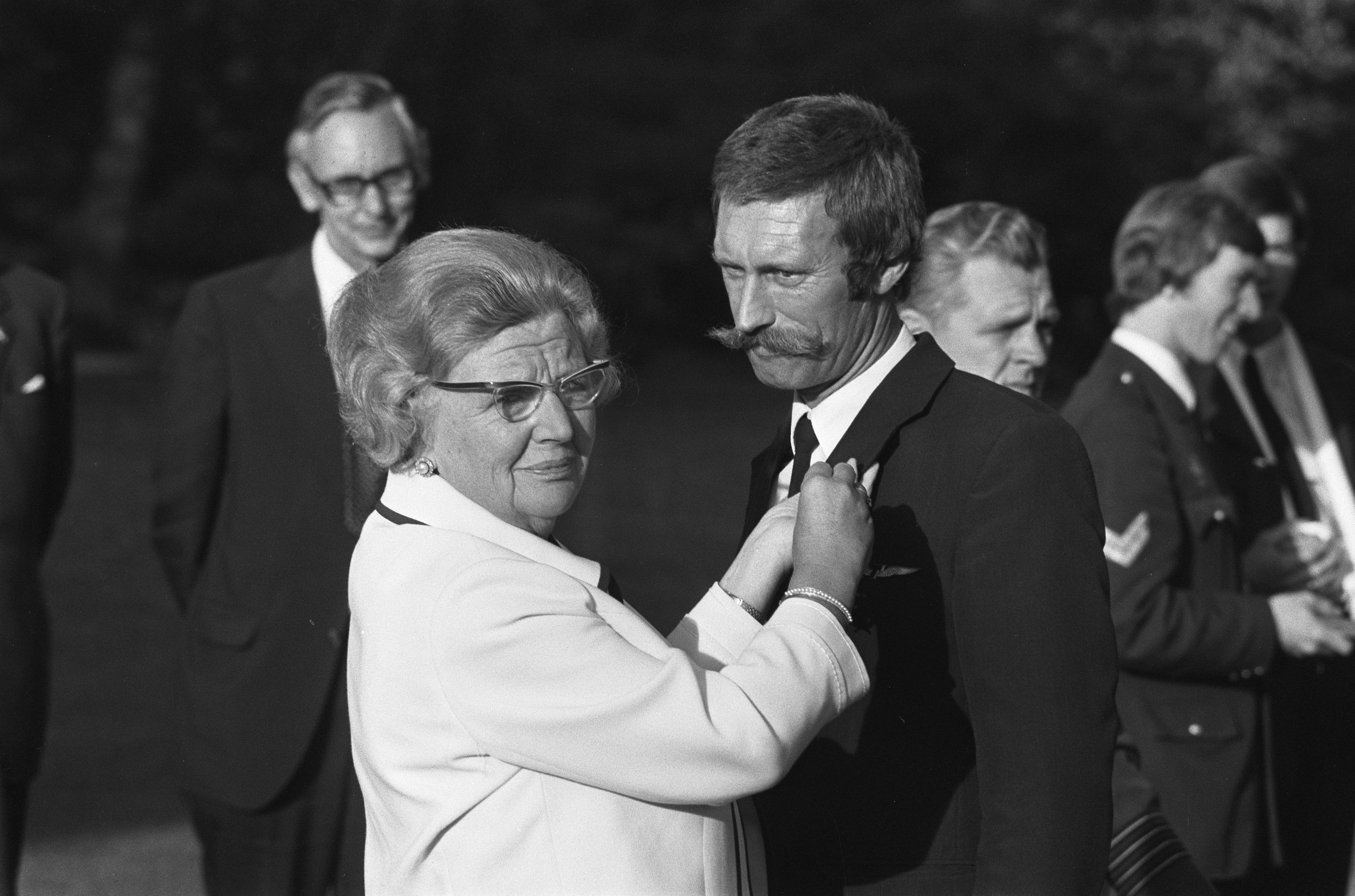
Sierks being awarded the Order of Orange-Nassau by Queen Juliana

After the flight Sierks became a national hero. For his heroism he received multiple national awards including the Knight Grand Cross of the Order of Orange-Nassau which was appointed to him by Juliana of the Netherlands. Other awards include the Order of the Netherlands Lion, and Airman's Cross.

Sierks moved to West Sussex, England, a few years later. He died on 7 November 2024, at the age of 92.

=== Awards and honors ===
- : Knight Grand Cross of the Order of Orange-Nassau
- : Order of the Netherlands Lion
- : Airman's Cross
