= 1974 Japanese Embassy attack in Kuwait City =

Terrorist incident in Kuwait

On 6 February 1974, Palestinian militants occupied the Japanese embassy in Kuwait City, taking the ambassador and ten others hostage. The militants' motive was to support the Japanese Red Army members and Palestinian militants who were holding hostages on a Singaporean ferry in what is known as the Laju incident. Ultimately, the hostages were released, and the guerrillas were allowed to fly to Aden.

== Purpose ==
The purpose behind the attack was to provide support to the four guerrillas trapped on a ferry named Laju they hijacked in Singapore after a failed attempt at destroying a Royal Dutch Shell refinery. The men had been trapped on the ferry for 7 days until they surrendered their weapons and freed their hostages, as a result of the embassy attack they would be flown to Kuwait and then to Yemen.

== Perpetrators ==
While the identities or even number of the men involved is unknown they are said to have been members of the Popular Front for the Liberation of Palestine, a secular left-wing Marxist-Leninist revolutionary socialist group founded by George Habash in 1967. They were previously known for plane hijackings such as the TWA Flight 840 hijacking in 1969. They were known to be allies of the Japanese Red Army and many other far-left terrorist groups and are still active to this day.

== The attack ==
Before noon on 6 February 1974, an unknown number of Palestinian militants who identified themselves as members of the Popular Front for the Liberation of Palestine occupied the Japanese embassy in Kuwait City. Taking the Japanese Ambassador to Kuwait and several members of his staff hostage. The militants' motive was to support Japanese Red Army members and other Palestinian militants who were holding hostages on a Singaporean ferry in what is known as the Laju incident. In conjunction with a third group known as the Sons of Occupied Arab Territories, these groups claimed responsibility for the Laju incident and demanded that the Japanese government send a plane to Singapore. The plane was then supposed to pick up the men responsible for the Laju incident, who were also holding hostages in a hijacked ferry, to Kuwait. The Japanese government would respond the next day on Thursday, 7 February, by appealing to the Kuwait government so they could land a special Japan Airlines plane with the militants from Laju; however, the Kuwait government refused. This was the first time Palestinian guerrillas struck in Kuwait as their royal family, headed by Sheik Sabah Al-Salim Al-Sabah, funded the Palestinian resistance movement. Kuwait had been a regular endpoint for Palestinian plane hijacking in the past and had considered itself safe.

== Resolution ==
The next day, Thursday, February 7, the Japanese government would give in to the guerrillas' demands and provide a plane for the perpetrators of the Laju incident. The guerrillas released the hostages unharmed and were flown to Yemen with the Laju perpetrators.

== Sources ==
- Embassy of Japan in the State of Kuwait
- "Terror Targets". Time. 17 March 1980. Archived from the original on 2012-10-24.
