= Jun Nishikawa =

Jun Nishikawa may refer to:

- Jun Nishikawa (JRA member)
- Jun Nishikawa (footballer)
