= 1977 Bangladesh mass executions =

Executions of soldiers by Ziaur Rahman

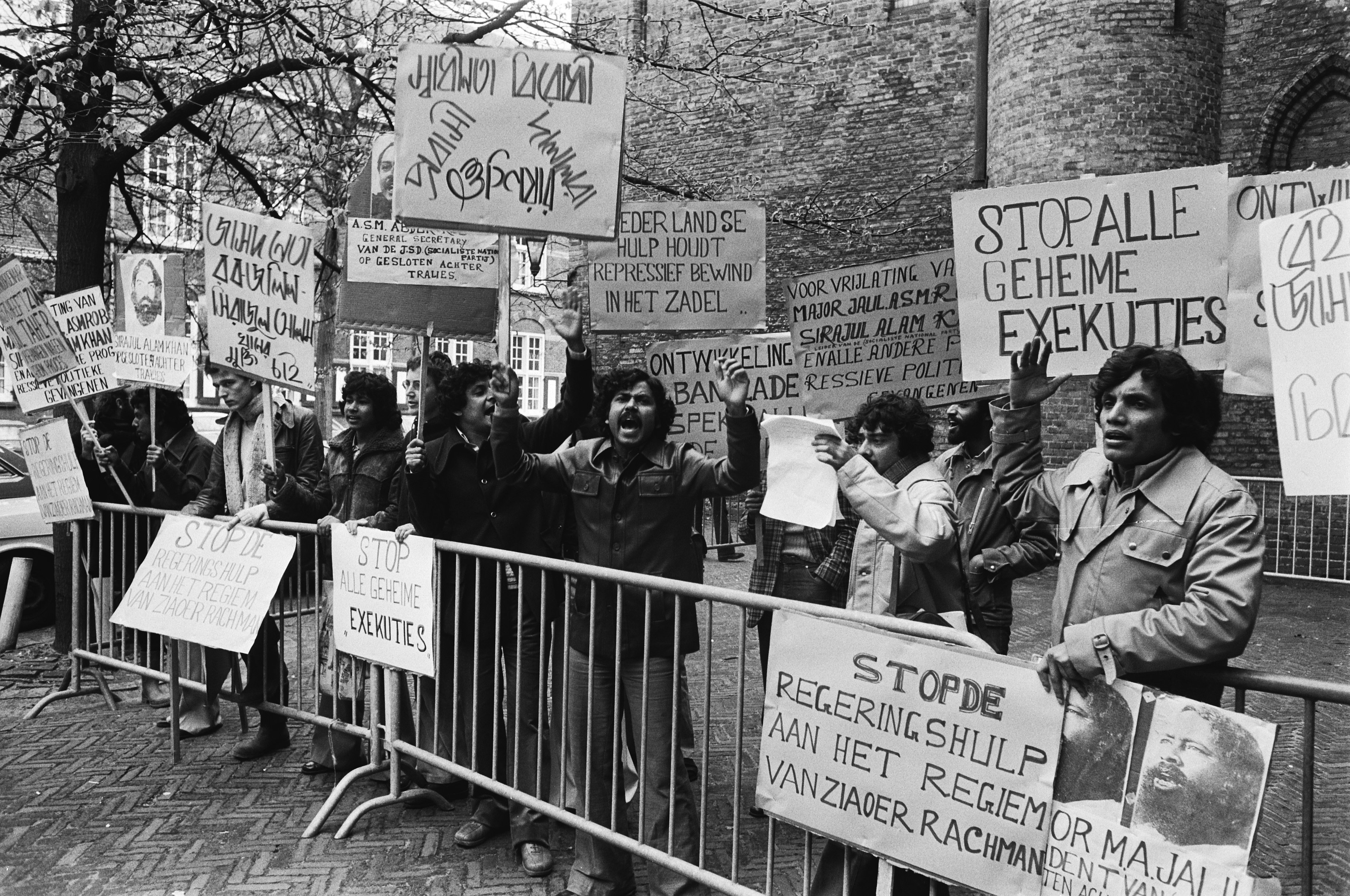
- Anti-Zia demonstrations in The Hague, Holland, 1979
- Location: Bangladesh
- Date: 9 October, 1977 – November, 1977 (2 months)
- Target: Coup Mutineers; Communists; Leftists; Mujibists
- Deaths: 1,143+
- Judge: Government of Bangladesh; Military Tribunal

Beginning on 9 October 1977, the government of Ziaur Rahman carried out mass executions of military personnel, following a series of attempted coups in Bangladesh. According to official records, 1143 members of the Bangladesh armed forces were hanged in two months, following 9 October 1977. This was the first mass execution of military personnel on this scale in South Asia.

== Background ==
=== Attempted coups against Ziaur Rahman ===
Lt. General Ziaur Rahman came to power following the 7 November 1975 coup. During this time, the armed forces of Bangladesh were heavily politicised, making it susceptible to coups and mutinies. Accordingly, Zia's government faced five attempted coups between November 1975 and September 1977.

When Zia visited Egyptian president Anwar Sadat on 25 September 1977, Sadat warned Zia about a plot in the armed forces which Egyptian intelligence services had uncovered. Zia and other high-ranking officers were to be killed during the Air Force Day celebrations on 28 September and a Marxist government was to be installed. Upon returning to Dhaka, Zia cancelled his appearance at the Air Force Day celebrations. However, the event was cancelled due to the Japanese Red Army's hijacking of Japan Air Lines Flight 472, which landed at Dhaka Airport.

During negotiations with the hijackers, a mutiny occurred on 30 September 1977 in Bogra, which resulted in the deaths of two officers. As a result, Zia organised a meeting of all senior officers in Dhaka and instructed them to keep their armouries secure. After this meeting, Zia took shelter in a secret hideout.

=== Air Force Mutiny ===
During the early hours of 2 October 1977, members of the Bangladesh Air Force and Bangladesh Army Signals Battalion attempted to overthrow Zia's government. The mutineers called for continued armed revolution and the creation of an army without officers. While the negotiations were ongoing, the mutineers arrived at Dhaka Airport and killed 11 air force officers. Zia and the Army Staff used the 46th (Dhaka) Brigade and 9th Division to suppress the uprising. One company under Major Mostafa cleared the airport terminal by 7 am, after killing at least 20 Air Force mutineers and taking 60 mutineers prisoner. 10 soldiers of the army were killed while fighting against the mutineers.

== Mass executions of military personnel ==
=== Mass arrests of air force personnel ===
After the coup failed, Air Vice Marshall A.G. Mahmud visited the Kurmitola air force base, where some of the mutineers were from. Mahmud allegedly threatened "You have killed 11 persons, so 1100 of you, will perish". Mahmud handed over control of the Kurmitola air force base to the army. Several days later, mass arrests of airmen from the Kurmitola base began. These airmen were taken to Dhaka Central Jail and tortured, which resulted in the deaths of several airmen. Military personnel who were tortured to death were not included on the official death toll, according to Professor Anwar Hossain.

=== Trials of alleged mutineers ===
To sentence the mutineers, Zia created 'special tribunals', which were chaired by junior commissioned officers and non-commissioned officers. Military personnel who were accused of participating in the mutiny were put on trial in groups and had no access to counsel. Within 48 hours of being sentenced to death, the condemned men were executed. The gallows at Dhaka Central Jail were extended, so that 3 to 4 men could be hanged at the same time. To ensure the death of the condemned men, the tendons or arteries of their hands and legs were severed after they were hanged.

Prisoners at Dhaka Central Jail recall hearing the screams of military personnel who protested their innocence as they were taken to the gallows. However, some military personnel were heard shouting political slogans.

=== Mass burials in Rajshahi ===
Following the mutiny in Bogra, hundreds of soldiers from Bogra Cantonment were executed and buried in mass graves in Rajshahi. The authorities declared a curfew at night, in order to bury the bodies of executed men in secret. Locals recalled seeing corpses dressed in army uniforms being buried at night. Handcuffs were reportedly found on some of the skeletons of army personnel who were buried in Sopura Stadium Graveyard.

== Aftermath ==
In Bangladesh: A legacy of Blood, journalist Anthony Mascarenhas described the mass executions as "the most brutal, devastating punishment exercise in the history of Bangladesh, carried out with utmost speed and total disregard for justice and the legal process".

The Daily Observer claimed "Nowhere else in the world has such incidents occurred, except in war times".
