= 1977 Bogra mutiny =

Rebellion in Bogra, Bangladesh

Date	30 September 1977
Location	Bogra Cantonment, Rajshahi Division, Bangladesh
Status	Defeat of the mutineers

Belligerents
Government of Bangladesh; Ministry of Defence; Bangladesh Armed Forces; Bangladesh Army	Opposition to Ziaur Rahman: (Bangladesh) 22nd Bengal Regiment

Commanders and leaders
(Bangladesh) Ziaur Rahman (Bangladesh) Lt. Hafizur Rahman †	(Bangladesh) Lt. Col. Zaman

Casualties and losses
2 lieutenants killed	At least 100 executed (Note: During the 1977 Bangladesh mass executions)

The 1977 Bogra mutiny was a mutiny in Bogra Cantonment, a military station near the city of Bogra in Bangladesh on 30 September 1977.

== Background ==
When Ziaur Rahman was the Chief of Army Staff, he served as the Chief Martial Law Administrator after the Assassination of Sheikh Mujibur Rahman. On 21 April 1977 President Abu Sadat Mohammad Sayem resigned and Zia became president of Bangladesh.

In July 1977, two months before the September uprising, the Bogra Cantonment had seen a mutiny which had led to the mutinous unit being disbanded. The cause behind that mutiny was resentment over an insufficient pay increase.

== Events ==
The mutiny took place in Bogra cantonment under the leadership of Lieutenant Colonel Zaman. The government of Bangladesh was preoccupied with Japan Airlines Flight 472 which was hijacked and had landed in Dhaka. Enlisted men had killed their officers and there were reports of gunfire in Bogra town. The 22nd Regiment had mutinied.

The mutiny failed. By the end of October 1977, special military tribunals had tried and convicted 55 people of involvement in the mutiny. They were sentenced to death. Amnesty International wrote that there was "reason to believe" that executions continued into the new year. According to a 2014 report in The Daily Observer, hundreds of soldiers were executed and buried in mass graves in Rajshahi.
