= Yū Kikumura =

Japanese militant member

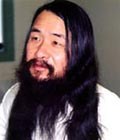
Yū Kikumura at ADX Florence

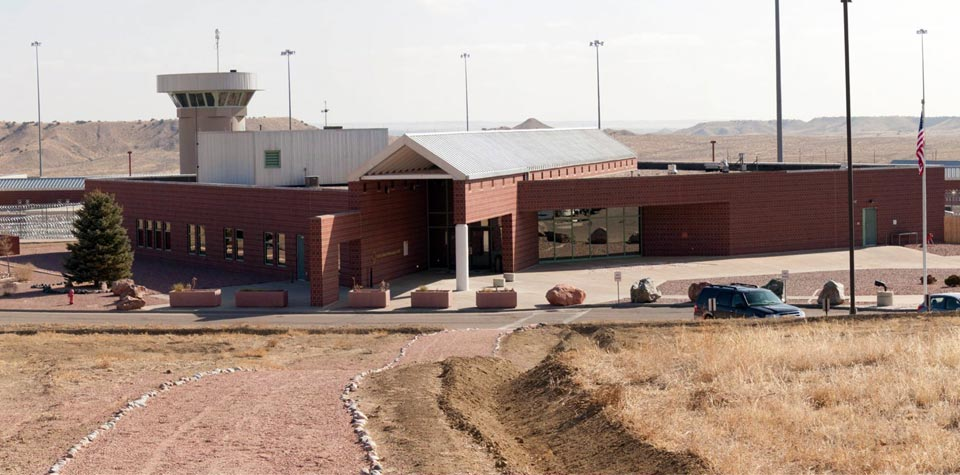
USP Florence ADMAX, where Kikumura was incarcerated

Yū Kikumura (菊村 憂, Kikumura Yū; born 1947) is an alleged member of the Japanese Red Army, an armed militant organization.

== Arrest in The Netherlands ==
Police arrested Kikumura in Schiphol Airport in Amsterdam in 1986 when they found him carrying a bomb in his luggage. After spending four months in prison, a judge ruled the search of his luggage was illegal and he was deported to Japan.

== Arrest in the United States ==
Kikumura was arrested on April 12, 1988, at a rest stop on the New Jersey Turnpike by a state trooper who thought he was acting suspiciously. He was found carrying three 18-inch (46-cm) mercury fulminate pipe bombs hidden in fire extinguishers containing roofing-nail shrapnel. Prosecutors believe that Kikumura had planned to bomb a US Navy recruitment office in the Veteran's Administration building on 24th Street in Manhattan on April 14, the anniversary of the U.S. raid on Libya. The terror attack was allegedly intended to be simultaneous with an attack in Naples, Italy, which did happen.

== Imprisonment ==
Kikumura was indicted on several counts of interstate transportation of explosive devices and passport violations. After a bench trial on stipulated facts, Kikumura was convicted on November 29, 1988, to serve 30 years in prison. Then U.S. attorney Samuel Alito represented the prosecution. In 1991, his sentence was reduced to 21 years and 10 months.

== Release ==
Kikumura, Federal Bureau of Prisons # 09008-050, was released on April 18, 2007. He had served a sentence of 221 months (slightly more than 18 years) at Florence ADMAX USP.

Upon Kikumura's release he was sent back to Japan via San Francisco International Airport. Upon arrival in Japan he was immediately arrested on charges of falsifying official documents. He was released in October 2007.
