= Jun Nishikawa (JRA member) =

Japanese JRA member

Jun Nishikawa (西川 純, Nishikawa Jun; born 8 August 1950) is a former member of the Japanese Red Army (JRA).

He was a member of the group that attacked the French embassy in The Hague in 1974. In April 1975 he was arrested in Stockholm before being released later that year as part of a deal with the Japanese government to free the hostages that JRA had taken in the AIA building siege in Kuala Lumpur.

He has been linked with the Japan Airlines Flight 472 hijacking carried out by the JRA on September 28, 1977. As a demand they asked for the release of several JRA members, including Junzo Okudaira, and their demands were met by the Japanese government. Nishikawa remained at large during this time.

Following an investigation co-ordinated by Interpol, and involving Bolivia, Ecuador and Peru, he was located and arrested 20 years later in Santa Cruz, Bolivia. He was eventually deported to Japan in November 1997, where he was arrested and put on trial. Nishikawa was found guilty of violating the hijacking law, passport forgery, attempted murder and taking hostages. On 30 March 2007, he was sentenced to life imprisonment. Japan's Supreme Court said on September 13, 2011, that it turned down an appeal by Nishikawa against his sentence of life imprisonment.
