= Laju incident =

1974 ferry hijacking in Singapore

Coordinates: 1.2284°N 103.7664°E

- Location: Pulau Bukom, Singapore; Eastern Anchorage
- Date: 31 January 1974; 52 years ago 11:45 am – 1:30 pm (UTC+8)
- Target: Shell oil refinery complex
- Attack type: Terrorist attack
- Weapons: Submachine guns 12 explosives
- Victim: 5 hostages
- Perpetrators: Japanese Red Army; Popular Front for the Liberation of Palestine
- Assailants: 2 Japanese Red Army militants 2 Popular Front for the Liberation of Palestine militants
- No. of participants: 4
- Motive: to disrupt large oil supply from Singapore to other countries

The Laju incident, also known as the Laju ferry hijacking, occurred on 31 January 1974 in Singapore. Four armed men from the militant groups Japanese Red Army and Popular Front for the Liberation of Palestine attacked the Shell oil refinery complex on Pulau Bukom and later hijacked the ferryboat Laju and took its five crew members hostage. The crisis was resolved after the Singaporean government provided the militants safe passage to the Middle East in exchange for the release of the hostages.

== Background ==
The group behind the attack-plan originally intended to attack an Esso oil refinery at Slagentangen outside Tønsberg in Norway but changed their plans after Norwegian authorities raised a public terror-alarm in 1973, causing the group to retract and change their plans.

== Attacks on Pulau Bukom ==
On 31 January 1974, a group of four men armed with submachine guns and explosives launched a terrorist attack on the Shell oil refinery complex located at Pulau Bukom, a small island lying to the south of mainland Singapore. Two of the militants were members of the Japanese Red Army (JRA) and the other two were from the Popular Front for the Liberation of Palestine (PFLP). Their goal was to seek the disruption of the large oil supply from Singapore to other countries, especially South Vietnam. On 1 February 1974, a PFLP spokesman made a statement in Beirut that the attack was to serve as a warning to all monopolistic oil companies on one hand and imperialism in general on the other, especially the resulting perceived oppression of the Arabs in the Middle East.

At the beginning of their operation, the militants' boat ran aground on a nearby coral reef. They managed to reach the shore of Pulau Bukom after convincing an unsuspecting passing boatman to tow them towards the island. As they headed towards a gate of an oil-tank installation, they fired shots at two passing vehicles but no one was injured. A sentry at a security post managed to escape and raise the alarm and set off a warning. The militants were able to detonate 3 of the 12 explosives which they were carrying but they only managed to cause little damage.

== Hijacking of Laju ==
In their attempt to escape after their botched attack-plan was carried out, the militants then hijacked the ferry-boat Laju at the island's main jetty and took all of its five crew-members hostage. It soon led to a chase after the Singapore authorities were aware of the hijacking and raised the alarm and the ferry-boat was quickly surrounded by gunboats from the Singapore Navy and patrol-boats from the Marine Police at the Eastern Anchorage, just outside Marina Bay.

This was followed by 7 days of intense negotiations between the Singapore government and the militants and during this same period of time, two of the hostages managed to escape their captors by jumping overboard in the middle of the night and were swiftly rescued. The militants later agreed to release the remaining crew members in exchange for a group of so-called "guarantors" for their safe passage to the Middle East. This group of 13 consisted of four commandos from the Singapore Armed Forces (SAF) and eight other local government officials and was led by S. R. Nathan, the then-Director of the Security and Intelligence Division (SID) at the Ministry of Defence.

== Crisis resolution and consequences ==
On the night of 7 February, the group was transferred from Laju to the Marine Police Headquarters and then to Paya Lebar Airport, where the militants surrendered their weapons and freed the remaining hostages. After they had done so, the group left Singapore on 8 February at 1:25 am, accompanied by S. R. Nathan's team on a specially arranged Japan Airlines flight to Kuwait. After reaching Kuwait, the 13-men party flew back and reached Singapore on the following day. The hijackers were later accepted and flown to South Yemen.

All members of the negotiating team received honours on National Day, 9 August 1974.

The incident was Singapore's first encounter with international terrorism. It also directly contributed to the beginning of the establishment of full-time National Service for the country's police force in 1975, one year after the incident, referred to as Police National Service (PNS), which was aimed at, initially, raising a sizeable source of manpower for the police in the event of another terrorist incident on vital installations and the provision of protection and security for the latter against the former.

== See also ==
- 1974 in Singapore
- Communist terrorism
- Counter-terrorism in Singapore
