= 1988 Naples bombing =

Terrorist attack against a United Service Organizations club

- Location: Naples, Italy
- Date: 14 April 1988; 8:00 pm (UTC+01:00)
- Target: Americans
- Attack type: Bombing
- Weapon: Car bomb
- Deaths: 5
- Injuries: 15
- Perpetrator: Japanese Red Army

On 14 April 1988, a powerful car bomb exploded in front of the United Service Organizations (USO) military recreational club in downtown Naples, causing the deaths of five people, and injuries to 15 others. The attack was perpetrated by a Japanese Red Army (JRA) member and came on the second anniversary of the 1986 United States bombing of Libya.

== Victims ==
Four Italian civilians were killed along with an American assigned to the U.S. Navy center in Naples. She was identified as 21-year-old Angela Simone Santos, a Puerto Rican servicewoman raised in Aguadilla, Puerto Rico and Ocala, Florida. Four American sailors were also among the wounded, and some North Africans were also hurt. Many sailors at the USO probably escaped injury as they were in basement rooms that were shielded from the blast.

== Responsibility ==
Two previously unheard Arab groups claimed responsibility, one of them saying "Imperialist Americans must die two years after their barbarous attack against the Libyan Arab state," referring to the 1986 United States bombing of Libya. Police later identified Junzo Okudaira as the main suspect, a member of the far-left Japanese Red Army (JRA) with links to groups in Lebanon. Okudaira was already wanted in Italy over a rocket and bomb attack against the American and British embassies in Rome in 1987, where nobody was hurt. Okudaira was staying at a hotel under a false Taiwanese identity. The Libyan ambassador said that the Libyan government had nothing to do with the attack.

A few days before the bomb attack, JRA member Yū Kikumura was arrested in the United States. Kikumura was thought to be planning a bomb attack on a U.S. Navy centre in New York City in retaliation to the Libya bombing of 1986, and to be simultaneous to the bombing in Naples.

In 1993, Okudaira was convicted in absentia for murder. He has never been caught.

== See also ==
- Rhein-Main Air Base bombing
- El Descanso bombing
- Bar Iruna attack
