= 1975 AIA building hostage crisis =

Japanese Red Army terror attack in Malaysia

AIA Building hostage crisis
- Location: 3°09′45.7″N 101°44′22.1″E; AIA Building; Kuala Lumpur, Malaysia
- Date: 5 August 1975- 10 August 1975
- Attack type: Hostage situation, terrorist attack
- Weapons: Pistols and explosive devices
- Injuries: Four
- Victims: Robert C. Stebbins; Fredrik Bergenstråhle; Ulla Ödqvist; Gerald Lancaster; Trudy Lancaster; Vick Lancaster; Rodney Lancaster; Adrian Lancaster
- Perpetrator: Japanese Red Army
- No. of participants: Five
- Defenders: Federal Reserve Unit; Royal Malaysia Police
- Motive: Release of several members of the Japanese Red Army

The AIA Building hostage crisis took place at the AIA (American Insurance Associates) Building in Jalan Ampang, Kuala Lumpur, Malaysia, on 5 August 1975. The Japanese Red Army took more than 50 hostages at the AIA building, which housed several embassies. The hostages included the United States consul and the Swedish chargé d'affaires. The gunmen won the release of five imprisoned terrorists and flew with them to Libya.

== Background ==
The Japanese Red Army was a communist terrorist organisation dedicated to eliminating the Japanese government and monarchy and launching a worldwide revolution. The organisation carried out many attacks and assassinations in the 1970s, including the Lod Airport massacre in Tel Aviv three years earlier.

== Key Malaysia rescue personnel ==
Inspector General of Police Mohammed Hanif Omar (35), leader of the RMP since 8 June 1974, he founded the Special Actions Unit. He took command of rescue operations during this incident.

Supt. M. Shamugham (40), was first commander of the Special Action Unit who had served as commander since January 1974 and previously he served with Police Field Forces (Pasukan Polis Hutan). This was his second mission after the hunt for Botak Chin which started a year earlier but was still ongoing; he escorted prisoners from Japan for the hostage exchange. He died in 1976.

DSP Mohd Zaman Khan (40), was strike team leader of Special Action Unit who attempted a rescue but aborted mission after Tan Sri Ghazali began negotiations with the JRA and Japanese government.

Manivasagam (late 40's), was Minister of Communications, who tried negotiating with the JRA but failed and was replaced by Home Affairs Minister Ghazali Shafie.

Ghazali Shafie (49), was Minister of Home Affairs who was in negotiations from early on until the end of the mission and persuaded President of Libya Colonel Muammar Gaddafi to allow the JRA and hostages into Libya. He also persuaded a very reluctant Sirimavo Bandaranaike, Prime Minister of Sri Lanka to allow the aircraft carrying the JRA and hostages to refuel there.

== Attacks ==
The AIA Building in Jalan Ampang, Kuala Lumpur used to house the United States and Swedish embassies. On 4 August 1975, 5 members of the JRA stormed the building and took 53 employees of the embassies hostage. All the hostages were gathered on Level 9 of the AIA Building. The JRA demanded that several of their imprisoned leaders be released, and threatened to massacre all 53 hostages if their demands were not met.

The Malaysian Prime Minister at the time was Tun Abdul Razak and his police chief was Mohammed Hanif Omar. The then Home Minister Ghazali Shafie was heavily involved in negotiations despite his being in Jakarta at the time.

Eventually, the Japanese government relented and agreed to the release of five JRA leaders. They were sent on a Japanese Airlines DC-8 to Kuala Lumpur. The Deputy Transport Minister Dato' Ramli Omar and secretary-general for the Home Ministry Tan Sri Osman Samsuddin Cassim were exchanged with the terrorists as hostages to guarantee safe conduct. The hostage-takers proceeded on the DC-8 with their freed leaders, as well as Omar and Cassim, to Libya, arriving at Tripoli Airport on 8 August after a stopover in Colombo. There they would be sheltered by dictator Muammar Gaddafi, who at the time supported a variety of terrorist organisations such as the PLO and the IRA. Samsuddin Cassim and Ramli Omar returned to Malaysia unharmed on 10 August.

=== Foreign Hostages ===
- Robert C. Stebbins – United States Consul
- Fredrik Bergenstråhle – Swedish embassy Officer
- Ulla Odqvist – Secretary of the Embassy of Sweden
- Gerald Lancaster – US citizen – age 50
- Trudy Lancaster – Australian citizen – age 32
- Vick Lancaster – Australian citizen – age 11
- Rodney Lancaster – Australian citizen – age 10
- Adrian Lancaster – Australian citizen age 9

== Aftermath ==
Among the prisoners freed by the Japanese government was Kunio Bandō, who had been jailed for his role in the Asama-Sansō incident. Bandō was later believed to have assisted in the hijacking of Japan Airlines Flight 472 from Paris to Tokyo in 1977, forcing the jet to land in Dhaka. Bandō remains at large and reportedly spent time between 1997 and 2007 in Russia, China, the Philippines, and Japan.

The US embassy was moved to a new location at the junction of Jalan U Thant and Jalan Tun Razak in the 1990s.

Swedish King Carl XVI Gustaf awarded the Royal Order of the Polar Star to Tan Sri Samsudin Osman Kassim on 16 September 2009, about 34 years later. The award was presented by the Swedish ambassador to Malaysia, HE Helena Sångeland.
