= Japan Air Lines Flight 472 (1977) =

Midair plane hijacking

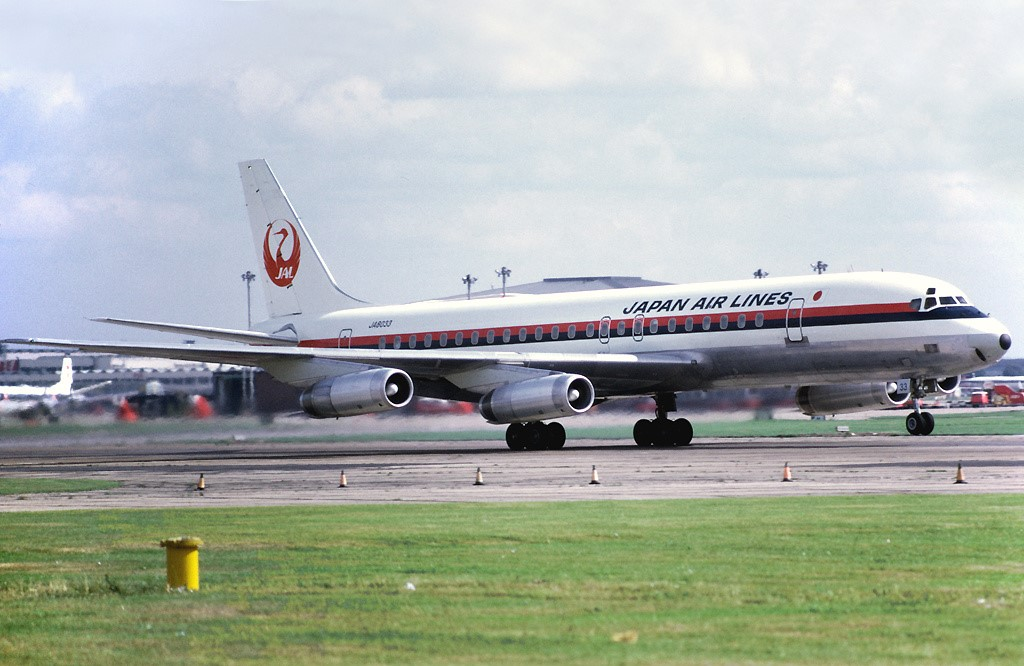
- JA8033, the aircraft involved in the hijacking, at Heathrow Airport in 1971

Hijacking
- Date: 28 September 1977
- Summary: Hijacking
- Site: Dhaka International Airport, Bangladesh

Aircraft
- Aircraft type: Douglas DC-8-62
- Operator: Japan Air Lines
- Registration: JA8033
- Flight origin: Charles de Gaulle Airport, Paris, France
- Stopover: Santacruz Airport, Bombay, India
- Destination: Tokyo International Airport, Tokyo, Japan
- Occupants: 156
- Passengers: 142 (including 5 hijackers)
- Crew: 14
- Fatalities: 0
- Survivors: 156

Japan Air Lines Flight 472 was an international flight that was hijacked by the Japanese Red Army (JRA) en route from Mumbai to Tokyo on 28 September 1977.

== Incident ==
The Douglas DC-8, en route from Paris to Haneda Airport in Tokyo with 156 people on board, stopped in Bombay, India. Shortly after taking off from Bombay, five armed JRA members, led by Osamu Maruoka, hijacked the aircraft and ordered it flown to Dhaka, Bangladesh. At Dhaka, the hijackers took the passengers and crew hostage, demanding US$6 million and the release of nine imprisoned JRA members. The Chief of Air Staff of Bangladesh Air Force, AG Mahmud, negotiated with the hijackers from the control tower. Things were further complicated at the airport when on 1 October 1977 Bangladesh Air Force mutinied with the lead negotiator almost being killed. The next day (29 September), five hostages were released, including American actress Carole Wells, who was on her honeymoon with her husband, former California assemblyman Walter J. Karabian. Karabian remained on board.

On 1 October Prime Minister Takeo Fukuda announced that the Japanese government would accept the hijackers' demands, on the principle that "the life of a single person outweighs the earth". Six of the imprisoned JRA members were then released.

A chartered Japan Airlines flight carried the money and the six released JRA members to Dhaka, where the exchange took place on 2 October. The hijackers released 118 passengers and crew members. On 3 October, they flew to Kuwait City and Damascus, where they released eleven more hostages. Finally, the aircraft was flown to Algeria, where it was impounded by authorities and the remaining hostages were freed.

== List of hijackers and released prisoners ==
Fugitives' portraits from the official website of The Metropolitan police departments (in Japanese)
- Bando in c. 1987
- Sasaki in c. 1998
- Okudaira in c. 1998
- Daidōji in c. 1994
- Nihei in 1976

=== Hijackers ===
- Osamu Maruoka (丸岡 修, Maruoka Osamu), caught in 1987 when he attempted to enter Japan on a false passport. A life sentence was finalized in 2000, and he died of a heart problem in 2011 in prison.
- Norio Sasaki (佐々木 規夫, Sasaki Norio), is still at large
- Kunio Bandō (坂東 國男, Bandō Kunio), is still at large
- Jun Nishikawa (西川 純, Nishikawa Jun)
- Haruo Wakō (和光 晴生, Wakō Haruo), hasn't been charged with this hijacking

=== Released prisoners ===
- Junzō Okudaira (奥平 純三, Okudaira Junzō), is still at large
- Tsutomu Shirosaki (城崎 勉, Shirosaki Tsutomu)
- Ayako Daidōji (大道寺 あや子, Daidōji Ayako), is still at large
- Yukiko Ekida (浴田 由紀子, Ekida Yukiko)
- Hiroshi Sensui (泉水 博, Sensui Hiroshi)
- Akira Nihei (仁平 映, Nihei Akira), is still at large

== Aftermath ==
The incident contrasted the European and American approach of non-negotiation with terrorists to Japan's approach of appeasing terrorists if necessary. Shortly after the incident, Japan's National Police Agency established a Special Assault Team to deal with future acts of terrorism. Several of the JRA terrorists involved in the hijacking have yet to be apprehended and their current whereabouts are unknown.

Osamu Maruoka, who also led the hijacking of Japan Air Lines Flight 404 in 1973, escaped and remained a fugitive until 1987 when he was arrested in Tokyo after entering Japan on a forged passport. Given a life sentence, he died in prison on 29 May 2011. Another of the hijackers, Jun Nishikawa, eventually returned to Japan, was arrested, convicted and sentenced to life imprisonment.

== See also ==
- List of hostage crises
