= Junzō Okudaira =

Terrorist affiliated with the Japanese Red Army

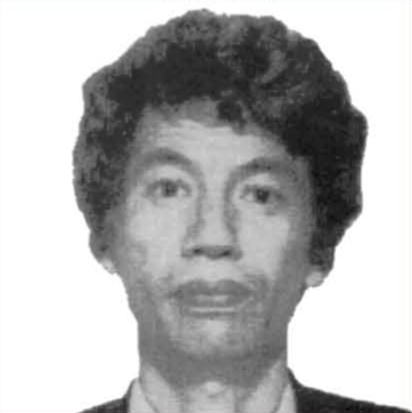
- Junzō Okudaira in 1998
- Born: February 2, 1949 (age 77); Shimonoseki, Yamaguchi, Japan

Junzō Okudaira (Japanese: 奥平 純三, romanized: Okudaira Junzō; Japanese pronunciation: [o̞kɯ̟da̠iɾa̠ d͡ʑɨ̃nd͡zo̞ː]; born February 2, 1949) is a Japanese former militant who was one of the three Japanese Red Army (JRA) members who attacked the French embassy in The Hague in 1974 and was the person who detonated a car bomb in front of a USO club in Naples in 1988. He was the younger brother of fellow JRA activist Tsuyoshi Okudaira.

== Overview ==
In 1976, Okudaira was arrested along with Toshihiko Hidaka on suspicion of a forged passport when he entered Jordan. Hidaka committed suicide during a police investigation. Okudaira was deported to Japan on October 13, 1976. He was released from the country after extrajudicial measures in the Dhaka Japan Airlines Hijacking case.

Okudaira was convicted in absentia in the United States on April 9, 1993, for the 1988 Naples bombing. Okudaira is also a suspect in the June 1987 car bombing and mortar attack against the U.S. Embassy in Rome. Okudaira currently remains at large. Through the Rewards for Justice program, the United States government is offering up to $5,000,000 for information leading to his arrest.

As of 2022 the details of Okudaira's life and/or death are unknown, and he is wanted internationally. Photographs distributed after April 2010 were later replaced with those taken in 1998.
