= Japanese Red Army =

Communist militant organization (1971–2001)

- 日本赤軍
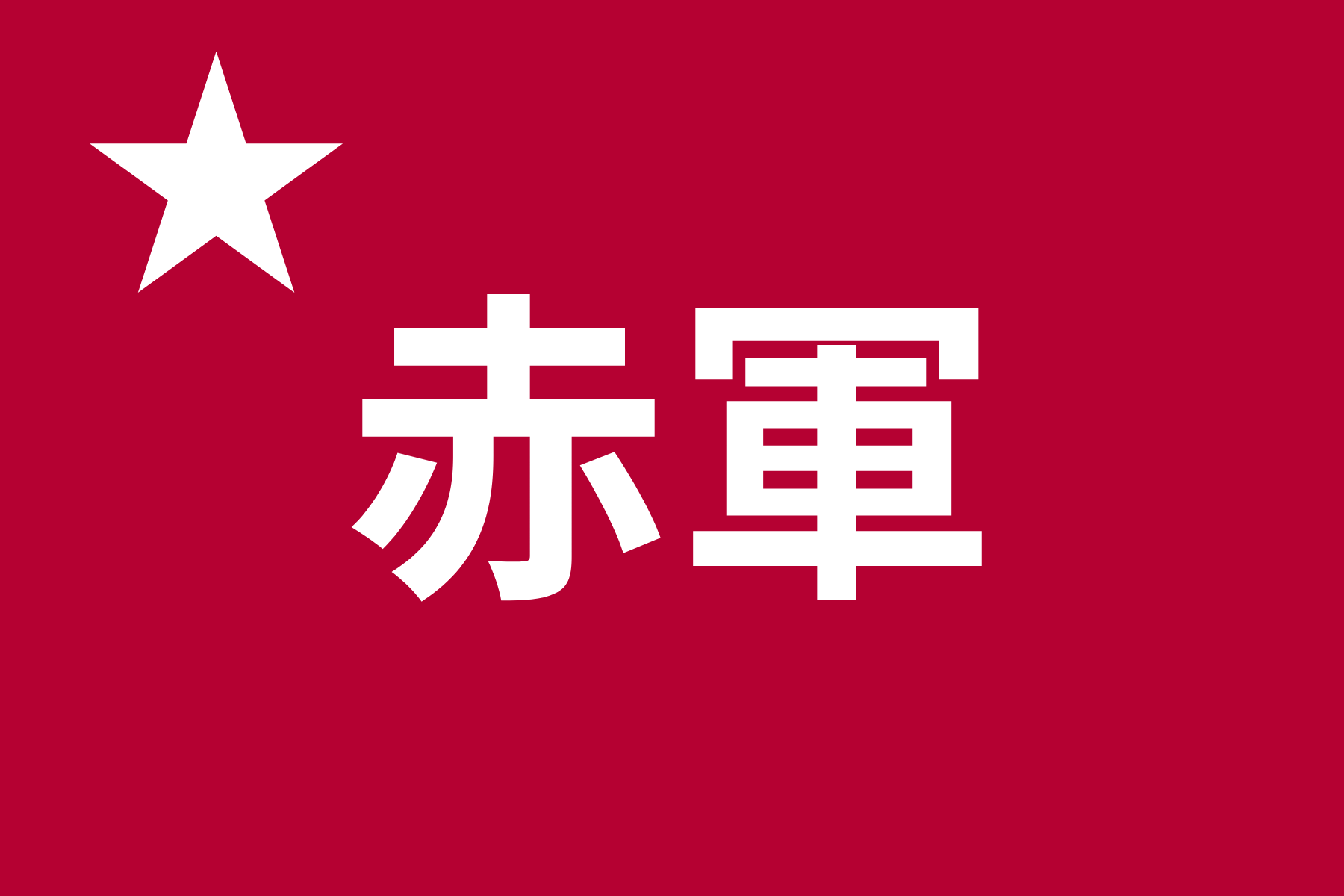
- Flag of the JRA; text reads sekigun, 'red army'
- Leaders: Fusako Shigenobu; Tsuyoshi Okudaira
- Dates active: 1971–2001 (30 years)
- Active regions: Japan, Middle East, Europe, South Asia, Southeast Asia
- Ideology: Communism; Marxism–Leninism; Maoism; Anti-fascism; Anti-imperialism; Anti-Zionism
- Political position: Far-left
- Status: Defunct

The Japanese Red Army (日本赤軍, Nihon Sekigun; abbr. JRA) was a far-left militant organization active from 1971 to 2001. The JRA was founded by Fusako Shigenobu and Tsuyoshi Okudaira in February 1971, and was most active in the 1970s and 1980s, operating mostly out of Lebanon with PFLP collaboration and funding from Muammar Gaddafi's Libya, as well as Ba'athist Syria and North Korea.

After the Lod Airport massacre, it sometimes called itself the Arab-JRA. The group was also variously known as the Anti-Imperialist International Brigade (AIIB), the Holy War Brigade, and the Anti-War Democratic Front. The JRA's stated goals were to overthrow the Japanese government and the monarchy, as well as to start a world revolution. It was designated a terrorist organization by Japan and the United States.

== History ==
Fusako Shigenobu had been a leading member in the Red Army Faction (赤軍派, Sekigun-ha) in Japan, whose roots lay in the Communist League, part of the militant New Left in Japan. Advocating revolution through terrorism, they set up their own group, declaring war on the state in September 1969. The police quickly arrested many of them, including founder and intellectual leader Takaya Shiomi, who was in jail by 1970. The Red Army Faction lost about 200 members, and the remnants merged with the Maoist group Revolutionary Left Faction (Kakumei sa-ha) to form the United Red Army (連合赤軍, Rengō Sekigun) in July 1971. The United Red Army became notable during the Asama-Sanso incident, when it murdered fourteen of its members on Mount Haruna, before a week-long siege involving hundreds of police leaving a bystander and a police officer dead.

Fusako Shigenobu had left Japan with only a handful of dedicated people, but her group is said to have had about 40 members at its height and was, after the Lod Airport massacre, one of the best-known armed leftist groups in the world.

The JRA had close ties with the Popular Front for the Liberation of Palestine (PFLP) and Wadie Haddad. It was dependent on the PFLP for financing, training, and weaponry.

In April 2001, Shigenobu issued a statement from detention declaring the JRA had disbanded, and that their battles should henceforth be done by legal means.

The National Police Agency publicly stated that a successor group was founded in 2001, called Rentai Movement (Rentai Movement, Mūbumento Rentai).

On February 15, 2022, the Tokyo Metropolitan Police Department renewed calls for arresting other ex-JRA terrorists who have not been arrested, including Kunio Bando and Kozo Okamoto.

== Activities ==
During the 1970s and 1980s, JRA carried out a series of attacks in Japan and around the world, including:

- May 30, 1972: the Lod Airport massacre; a gun and grenade attack at Israel's Lod Airport in Tel Aviv, now Ben Gurion International Airport, killed 26 people; about 80 others were wounded. One of the three attackers then committed suicide with a grenade, another was shot in the crossfire. The only surviving attacker was Kōzō Okamoto. Many of the victims were Christian pilgrims.
- July 1973: Red Army members led the hijacking of Japan Air Lines Flight 404 over the Netherlands. The passengers and crew were released in Libya, where the hijackers blew up the aircraft.
- January 1974: the Laju incident; the JRA attacked a Shell facility in Singapore and took five hostages; simultaneously, the PFLP seized the Japanese embassy in Kuwait. The hostages were exchanged for a ransom and safe passage to South Yemen.
- September 13, 1974: the French Embassy in The Hague, Netherlands was stormed. The ambassador and ten other people were taken hostage and a Dutch policewoman, Joke Remmerswaal, was shot in the back, puncturing a lung. After lengthy negotiations, the hostages were freed in exchange for the release of a jailed Red Army member (Yatsuka Furuya), $300,000 and the use of an aircraft. The hostage-takers flew first to Aden, South Yemen, where they were not accepted and then to Syria. Syria did not consider hostage-taking for money revolutionary, and forced them to give up their ransom.
- August 1975: the Red Army took more than 50 hostages at the AIA building housing several embassies in Kuala Lumpur, Malaysia. The hostages included the US consul and the Swedish chargé d'affaires. The gunmen won the release of five imprisoned comrades and flew with them to Libya.
- September 1977: The Red Army hijacked Japan Airlines Flight 472 over India and forced it to land in Dhaka, Bangladesh. The Japanese Government freed six imprisoned members of the group and allegedly paid a $6M ransom.
- December 1977: a suspected lone member of the Red Army hijacked Malaysian Airline System Flight 653. The flight was carrying the Cuban ambassador to Tokyo, Mario Garcia. The Boeing 737 crashed killing all 100 passengers and crew on board.
- May 1986: the Red Army fired mortar rounds at the embassies of Japan, Canada and the United States in Jakarta, Indonesia.
- November 1986: The New Peoples Army, a branch of the Communist Party of the Philippines, kidnapped Nobuyuki Wakaouji, the branch manager of Mitsui & Co. in Manila, Philippines with a ransom of $10 million (1.2 billion yen) paid, although there were initial demands for a ransom of $8 million. According to CPP spokesman Gregorio Rosal, the kidnapping was condemned by the party. There is still speculation that the JRA helped in the abduction.
- June 1987: a similar attack was launched on the British and United States embassies in Rome, Italy.
- April 1988: Red Army members detonated a car bomb outside of a USO recreational facility in Naples, which killed 4 Italian civilians and 1 U.S. servicewoman, and injured 15 others.
- In the same month, JRA operative Yū Kikumura was arrested with explosives on the New Jersey Turnpike highway in the United States, apparently to coincide with the USO bombing. He was convicted of these charges and served time in a United States prison until his release in April 2007. Upon his return to Japan he was immediately arrested on suspicion of using fraudulent travel documents.

== Known members ==
- Fusako Shigenobu, co-founder and leader, arrested in Osaka, Japan, November 2000 and stood accused of orchestrating attacks, kidnappings and hijackings. A court in Tokyo sentenced her in February 2006 to serve 20 years in prison for attempted murder, kidnapping and confinement for her part in helping to plan the 1974 French Embassy attack in The Hague. Shigenobu was released on May 28, 2022.
- Tsuyoshi Okudaira, co-founder and leader, killed while carrying out the Lod Airport massacre.
- Osamu Maruoka, former leader and hijacker of two aircraft, was arrested in November 1987 in Tokyo after entering Japan on a forged passport. Given a life sentence, he died in prison on May 29, 2011.
- Haruo Wakō, former leader, arrested in Lebanon in February 1997 before being deported to Japan to be sentenced further.
- Masao Adachi, Kazuo Tohira, and Mariko Yamamoto were also imprisoned in Lebanon on charges of forgery yet were subsequently sent to Jordan before being handed over to Japan.
- Kuniya Akagi, a collaborator of the JRA, was arrested after returning to Osaka from Pyongyang via Beijing in order to be questioned over the kidnapping of three Japanese nationals in Europe by North Korean spies in the 1980s. He is linked to Shirō Akagi, who took part in the Yodo-go hijacking (See also: Japan Airlines Flight 351).
- Kunio Bando, one of the hijackers of Japan Airlines Flight 472, is still on Interpol's wanted list. He may have taken refuge in the Philippines in 2000.
- Ayako Daidōji, a former member of East Asia Anti-Japan Armed Front who joined the JRA in 1979, is on the wanted list and still at large.
- Yukiko Ekida, a former member of East Asia Anti-Japan Armed Front who joined the JRA in 1979, was arrested in March 1995 in Romania and subsequently deported to Japan. She received a sentence of 20 years for attempted murder and violating the explosives law in a series of bombings targeting large companies in 1974 and 1975. The trial of Ekida was originally started in 1975 but was suspended when she was released from prison in 1977. Her release was part of a deal with the Japanese Red Army during the hijacking of a Japanese airliner to Bangladesh.
- Yatsuka Furuya (birth name: Yoshiaki Yamada) joined the JRA in 1973 and took part in the Laju ferry hijacking in Singapore in 1974. His arrest in Paris later that year precipitated the French Embassy attack to free Furuya, as the JRA was concerned he might reveal their organizational structure and plans to French police. Arrested again in 1986, he was imprisoned for a year, but was released after his sentence expired and is now free, albeit under constant police surveillance.
- Yū Kikumura was arrested with explosives on the New Jersey Turnpike in 1988 and served over 18 years of a 30‑year prison sentence in the United States. In April 2007, Kikumura was released from US incarceration and immediately arrested upon his return to Japan. He was released in October 2007.
- Hisashi Matsuda, one of the hostage takers at the AIA building siege in Kuala Lumpur, is on the wanted list and still at large.
- Akira Nihei, one of the hijackers of Japan Airlines Flight 472, is wanted and still at large.
- Jun Nishikawa – One of the attackers of the French Embassy at The Hague in 1974, was arrested in Stockholm before being released later that year as part of a deal with the Japanese government to free the hostages that JRA had taken in the AIA building siege in Kuala Lumpur. After 20 years in hiding, he was arrested in Bolivia and deported to Japan, where he was tried and sentenced to life in prison.
- Kōzō Okamoto was the only survivor of the group of three JRA terrorists (alongside Tsuyoshi Okudaira and Yasuyuki Yasuda) attacking Lod airport in 1972, now called Ben Gurion International Airport. He was jailed in Israel, but in May 1985, Okamoto was set free in an exchange of prisoners between Israeli and Palestinian forces. Subsequently, he was imprisoned in Lebanon for three years for forging visas and passports. The Lebanese authorities granted Okamoto political asylum in 1999 for having participated in attacks against Israel and being allegedly tortured while serving his prison sentence in Israel.
- Junzō Okudaira was one of the three Japanese Red Army (JRA) members who attacked the French embassy in The Hague in 1974 and was the person who detonated a car bomb in front of a USO club in Naples in 1988. As of 2022, he remains at large.
- Norio Sasaki, one of the hijackers of Japan Airlines Flight 472, is wanted and still at large.
- Hiroshi Sensui, a JRA militant living in the Philippines, was arrested by the Integrated National Police as part of anti-terrorist measures to prevent terrorist incidents from taking place in the Seoul Olympic games after being tipped off by the Japanese National Police Agency.
- Tsutomu Shirosaki, an alleged conspirator who fired two mortar shells towards the Embassy of Japan, United States and Canada from a room in President Hotel (now Pullman Hotel) in the Jakarta, Indonesia on May 14, 1986. Nobody was injured in the incident as the bombs did not explode. United States court sentenced Shirosaki to 30 years in prison in 1998 for attempted murder and other crimes in connection with the mortar attack. His prison sentence was shortened for good behaviour and he was released in January 2015. When Shirosaki returned to Japan the following month, Tokyo police arrested him for alleged arson and attempted murder in connection with the 1986 mortar attack. In November 2016, he was sentenced to 12 years in prison but he died in July 2024.
- Yoshimi Tanaka was arrested in Cambodia in 1996 and extradited to Japan. A Tokyo court sentenced him to 12 years in prison in 2002 for his involvement in the Yodo-go hijacking, in which a Japan Airlines plane was hijacked to North Korea. He died in 2007.
- Kazue Yoshimura, reported to have taken part in the hostage crisis in The Hague, was arrested by Peruvian DIRCOTE agents in Lima on May 25, 1996, after alleged contacts with members of the Maoist Shining Path (SP) insurgency (even possibly with then-head of the organization Comrade Feliciano). The trace to her arrest was established after the 1995 Bucharest capture of Yukiko Ekita with a false Peruvian passport. Yoshimura had first entered Peru in February 1993 with a Philippine passport and later returned with the name of Yoko Okuyama, supposedly intended on travelling to the coca-growing Huallaga Valley, the last stronghold of the diminished Peruvian Maoist insurgency as well as a drug-trafficking haven. According to Peruvian Caretas magazine, she was intending on helping establish a JRA presence in South America and may have even established contacts with Jun Nishikawa, another JRA operative later captured in Bolivia. Yoshimura was later deported to Japan by the government of Alberto Fujimori (a Japanese Peruvian), who stated that there was no proof against her despite the overwhelming intelligence data. The move was allegedly the result of pressure from the Japanese authorities. In December 1997, Yoshimura was sentenced to two and a half years imprisonment for passport forgery.

== Films ==
- The 1971 Sekigun – PFLP. Sekai Sensō Sengen, Red Army – PFLP: Declaration of World War, shot on location in Lebanon, produced by Kōji Wakamatsu (According to Patricia Steinhoff, a more accurate translation would be Manifesto for World Revolution). A propaganda film for the Red Army sympathisers in Japan. One of the people showing the film around Japan with the producer was Mieko Toyama, a close friend of Fusako Shigenobu, who was murdered in the winter training camp massacre.
- A 1999 documentary by Rabih El-Amine Ahmad the Japanese, Lod-Roumié-Tokyo tells Okamoto's story from the perspective of five major personalities that knew him in Beirut.
- The 2009 Malaysian TV drama series Suatu Ketika... Soldadu Merah (Once Upon A Time... Red Soldier) is based on the 1975 Kuala Lumpur attack of the Japanese Red Army.
- In 2010, Fusako Shigenobu and Masao Adachi were featured in the documentary Children of the Revolution, which tells the story of Shigenobu and the Japanese Red Army through the eyes of Mei Shigenobu.
- In the 2010 French-German TV Film Carlos, members of the Japanese Red Army feature when they stormed the French Embassy in The Hague and associating with the PFLP and the German Revolutionary Cells.
- The 2011 Bangladeshi film The Young Man Was, Part 1: United Red Army by visual artist Naeem Mohaiemen is about the 1977 hijacking of JAL 472 and the subsequent consequences inside Bangladesh.
- A 2012 documentary by Philippe Grandrieux and Nicole Brenez Masao Adachi. Portrait – First episode of the collection The Beauty May Have Strengthened Our Resoluteness, shot on location in Tokyo, tells the daily life of Adachi and his reminiscences.

== See also ==
- Red Army Faction (Japan)
- United Red Army
- East Asia Anti-Japan Armed Front
- Anti-Japaneseism
- Zengakuren
- New Left in Japan
- Communist League (Japan)
- Revolutionary Communist League, National Committee
- Japan Revolutionary Communist League (Revolutionary Marxist Faction)

== Bibliography ==
- Andrews, William Dissenting Japan: A History of Japanese Radicalism and Counterculture, from 1945 to Fukushima. London: Hurst, 2016. ISBN 978-1849045797
- Kapur, Nick (2018). Japan at the Crossroads: Conflict and Compromise after Anpo. Cambridge, MA: Harvard University Press. ISBN 978-0674984424.
- Pedahzur, Ami (2009). The Israeli Secret Services and the Struggle against Terrorism. Columbia University Press. ISBN 978-0231140423.
- Smith, Brent L. (1994). Terrorism in America: Pipe Bombs and Pipe Dreams. State University of New York Press. ISBN 978-0791417607.
- Wright-Neville, David (2010). Dictionary of Terrorism. Polity Press. ISBN 978-0745643014.
