= Takaya Shiomi =

Japanese communist activist (1941–2017)

- 塩見 孝也
- Born: May 22, 1940; Osaka, Osaka Prefecture, Japan
- Died: November 14, 2017 (aged 76); Kodaira, Tokyo Prefecture, Japan
- Education: Osaka University
- Years active: 1961–1970
- Organization: Red Army Faction
- Movement: Communism, New Left

Takaya Shiomi (塩見 孝也, Shiomi Takaya; May 22, 1940 - November 14, 2017) was a Japanese communist activist and the founder and leader of Red Army Faction (Sekigunha), a schismatic militant subfaction of the Japan Communist League. He was the mastermind behind the hijacking of Japan Air Lines Flight 351 to North Korea in 1970, although his arrest just days prior prevented his direct participation in the incident.

== Early life ==
Takaya Shiomi was born the son of a doctor on May 22, 1940, in Osaka, Japan. He's father is Ryukyuans, a came from Okinawa Prefecture. However, his family moved to Kamine Village, Wake district, Okayama Prefecture (now Bizen city) when he was two year old to escape wartime bombing, and then resettled in Onomichi city in Hiroshima Prefecture upon the conclusion of World War II. In 1961, he enrolled in the Faculty of Literature at Osaka University, planning to major in philosophy. He soon became involved in communist activism, joining the "Kansai faction" of a New Left organization called the Communist League, better known by its German-derived nickname, "the Bund," which had recently fallen into schisms and disarray. Shiomi dropped out of university after just two years, but remained active in the Kansai Bund for the remainder of the 1960s.

== Formation of the Red Army Faction ==
By 1968, Shiomi had risen to become one of the highest-ranking members of the Kansai Bund, which had since reconstituted itself as a national organization known as the "Second Bund" (第二次ブント, Dainiji Bunto). That year, Shiomi decided that even the militant Second Bund was not militant enough, and broke away to found his own subgroup called the "Red Army Faction" (RAF), which called for immediate, armed revolution and began making plans for a violent uprising in Japan, originally intended to coincide with the 1970 Anpo protests.

Shiomi's main theory in founding the Red Army Faction was that by first carrying out a successful armed proletarian revolution in Japan, Japan would become the headquarters of a worldwide revolution against the United States of America and its allies, and the Red Army Faction would become the leaders of that revolution.

Finding the rest of the Second Bund unamenable to the cause of immediate, armed revolution, Shiomi and his followers in the RAF signaled their open split from their parent organization by launching an assault on the Bund's National Congress held at Meiji University in Tokyo on July 5, 1969, briefly seizing control of the venue. The next day, Bund students from Chuo University launched a counter-attack, kidnapping Shiomi and others, and imprisoning them for three weeks in a stronghold on the Chuo University campus, where they were subjected to threats and torture. Although Shiomi and the others eventually managed escape by descending from a third floor window using a makeshift rope constructed from a curtain and a hose, during the escape Red Army Faction member Jо̄ji Mochizuki fell and hit his head and would die from his injuries several weeks later.

As a result of this incident, the Japan Communist Party expelled Shiomi and all other known members of the Red Army Faction the following month. On September 5, 1969, Shiomi and other RAF members publicly appeared at Hibiya Public Hall in Tokyo to declare the independence of the Red Army Faction from the Communist League and announce the start of an immediate, armed revolution. The Hall was surrounded by uniformed police, while plainclothes police officers photographed the 300 or so people present, many of whom wore ski masks to conceal their identities.

== Launch of armed struggle ==
On September 21, 1969, members of the Red Army Faction threw molotov cocktails at three police boxes in Osaka, in an incident grandiosely recollected by RAF members as the "Osaka War." Similarly on September 30, RAF members threw molotov cocktails at the Motofuji police box in Tokyo, which they then declared to have been the "Tokyo War."

Meanwhile, the group planned more substantive attacks against government agencies and the Prime Minister's official residence, for which they began "training" at the Daibosatsu mountain pass northwest of Tokyo. However, on November 5, 1969, having been tipped off by informants, police raided the inn where the student militants were sleeping, arresting 53 group members (including many of Shiomi's key lieutenants, although Shiomi was not among them) and capturing detailed plans for the intended attacks. Realizing that the RAF could no longer operate openly in Japan, Shiomi took the organization underground, and began searching for a way to escape Japan so they could continue their guerrilla training overseas.

== Arrest, airline hijacking, and RAF schism ==
In early 1970, Shiomi began making plans to hijack a Japanese airliner, codenamed "Operation Phoenix," that would allow group members to fly to Cuba and continue their training. However, just before the hijacking could take place, Shiomi was arrested by chance on the street in Komagome, Tokyo on March 15, 1970, having been mistaken for a common thief. Nevertheless, the remaining hijackers pressed on with their plans, and on March 31, 1970, nine members of the Red Army Faction, armed with katana swords and a homemade bomb, hijacked Japan Airlines Flight 351, a domestic Japan Airlines Boeing 727 out of Tokyo International Airport carrying 129 people aboard. After being informed that the airliner did not have enough fuel to fly all the way to Cuba, they forced the crew to fly the plane to Fukuoka and later Gimpo Airport in Seoul, where all the passengers were freed. The aircraft then flew to North Korea, where the hijackers abandoned it and the crewmembers were released. The hijackers were granted political asylum by the North Korean government of Kim Il Sung, and several of them still reside in North Korea to this day.

Between February and July 1971, Red Army Faction members who remained in Japan, now under the leadership of Tsuneo Mori, carried out a series of relatively successful armed robberies of banks and post offices, in an effort to secure funds for their armed uprising. However, the loss of Shiomi's ideological leadership, combined with relentless pursuit by police and continued arrests of key members, had taken a severe toll on the organization's cohesion. A schism arose between those remaining members who wished to carry out Shiomi's last command to relocate overseas, and those who wished to implement Shiomi's original vision of starting the worldwide revolution in Japan. Those that wanted to relocate overseas became the Japanese Red Army, led by Shigenobu Fusako and Tsuyoshi Okudaira, while those who wished to continue the revolution at home in Japan joined forces with the Kanagawa prefectural branch of the Revolutionary Left Faction to form the United Red Army, led by Tsuneo Mori and Hiroko Nagata.

== Trial and prison sentence ==
Shiomi was indicted under the Explosives Control Law as a co-conspirator in the hijacking of JAL Flight 351. In 1980, after a lengthy trial, a sentence of 18 years' imprisonment was handed down. Shiomi was incarcerated at Fuchū Prison and ended up spending a total of 19 years and 9 months behind bars (including pre-trial detention) before being released in December 1989.

== Later years ==
After his release from prison, Shiomi made common cause with right-wing ultranationalists on the basis of Japanese nationalism and anti-Americanism, often appearing at meetings held by the Issuikai and other right-wing groups. He also stirred up controversy by equating the Flight 351 hijackers with other Japanese citizens abducted by North Korea.

In 2015, he ran for city council in Kiyose city in Tokyo prefecture, under the slogan "Overthrow the Abe administration, which robs young people of hope, and fight against the Kiyose municipal government, which bullies the elderly." However he was defeated, coming in 22nd out of 23 candidates in a race for 20 council seats.

Shiomi died of heart failure on November 14, 2017.
