= Fusako Shigenobu =

Japanese communist activist (born 1945)

- 重信 房子
- Born: September 28, 1945 (age 81); Setagaya, Tokyo, Japan
- Other name: Fusako Okudaira
- Education: Meiji University (B.A.)
- Years active: 1965–present
- Organization: Japanese Red Army
- Movement: Communism, PFLP
- Spouse: Tsuyoshi Okudaira (deceased)
- Children: Mei Shigenobu (daughter)
- Status: Released
- Convictions: Conspiracy to attack the French Embassy in The Hague; Passport forgery (2 counts)
- Penalty: 20 years imprisonment

Fusako Shigenobu (Japanese: 重信 房子, romanized: Shigenobu Fusako; IPA: [ɕiɡe̞no̞bɯ̟ ɸɯ̟sa̠ko̞]; born September 28, 1945) is a Japanese communist activist, writer, and the founder and leader of the now-disbanded militant group Japanese Red Army (JRA).

Born in Japan, Shigenobu became involved in New Left activism while attending night school at Meiji University in Tokyo. In 1969, she joined the Red Army Faction (RAF), a communist group that advocated immediate, armed revolution against the governments of the United States and Japan. Eventually becoming one of its senior leaders, Shigenobu played a significant role in establishing the International Relations Bureau for the organization.

In 1971, she helped found the JRA as an offshoot of the RAF. That same year, Shigenobu and the JRA relocated to the Middle East in an effort to start a world revolution, therefore she came in contact with terror groups within Popular Front for the Liberation of Palestine (PFLP). During the 1970s and 1980s, members of the JRA took part in a number of violent incidents, including bombings, mass shootings, and hijackings. Although Shigenobu did not directly participate in these activities, during this time she attained international fame as the leader and public-facing spokesperson for the JRA.

Under her leadership, the JRA allied with Palestinian militant groups to carry out high-profile terrorist attacks globally, most notably the Lod Airport Massacre (at what is now Ben Gurion Airport) on May 30, 1972.

Arriving in the baggage area, the gunmen pulled assault rifles and grenades from violin cases and fired indiscriminately into the crowd. 26 people were murdered (mostly Puerto Rican pilgrims and Israeli citizens) and over 80 were injured.

Two attackers died during the assault, while the third, Kozo Okamoto, was captured. Shigenobu coordinated logistics and provided political backing for the attack.

Despite initially supporting Terror acts, in later years Shigenobu expressed remorse about her involvement with violent militancy, and focused on grassroots support for and solidarity with the Palestinian people. Throughout her years in hiding and later imprisonment, Shigenobu authored 10 books, including a book of poetry.

Following her arrest in 2000 after several years of hiding, Shigenobu was put on trial for passport forgery and conspiracy involving an attempted hostage-taking operation at the French Embassy in The Hague in 1974. She was sentenced to 20 years in prison in 2006 and released in 2022.

== Early life ==
Shigenobu was born on September 28, 1945, in the Setagaya ward of Tokyo. Her father had served as a major in the Imperial Japanese Army and had been dispatched to Manchukuo. Prior to his military service, he was a teacher at a terakoya (寺子屋) (or temple school) for poor village children in Kyushu. A right-wing ultranationalist, he had been implicated in a failed prewar coup d'etat by military officers. After the war, he worked as a grocer and Shigenobu grew up in relative poverty. Although he remained staunchly right wing, Shigenobu's father was sympathetic to her activist impulses, and respected her militancy. In later years, he consistently refused to apologize on behalf of his daughter for her actions, despite an intense pressure campaign to do so.

After high school, Shigenobu went to work for Kikkoman in a soy sauce factory while taking night courses at Meiji University. She eventually received a Bachelor of Arts in political economy and history. In 1965, she joined the student movement at Meiji University that was protesting an increase in tuition fees. In 1966, she joined the New Left group the Communist League, better known as the "Second Bund," and in 1969 she became a leading member of the group's "Red Army" splinter faction, which would eventually evolve into a separate group called the Japanese Red Army. During this time Shigenobu, renowned within the movement for her beauty and sex appeal, worked in a Tokyo hostess club and loyally turned over all her earnings to support the movement.

== JRA movement ==
Fusako Shigenobu (R) and Red Army member Kōzō Okamoto.

By 1970, Shigenobu had risen to become the only woman on the Central Committee of the Red Army Faction. However, she began to grow disenchanted by what she viewed as the sexism inherent in the Japanese New Left movement and the RAF in particular, and increasingly intrigued by the possibility of making common cause with the Palestinian liberation movement as a stepping stone on the path to world revolution. In February 1971, Shigenobu decided to relocate to the Middle East with a self-appointed mission to establish an international branch of the RAF for these purposes. To this end, she entered into a sham marriage with fellow militant Tsuyoshi Okudaira to secure his last name, because while "Fusako Shigenobu" was known to Japanese police, "Fusako Okudaira" was not. Arriving in Beirut, Lebanon, in March 1971, the two activists did not act as a couple and lived in separate apartments.

Soon after arriving in Lebanon, Shigenobu split with the Red Army Faction in Japan due to both geographical and ideological distance, as well as a personal conflict with the new leader, Tsuneo Mori. Mori's faction went on to link up with the Maoist Revolutionary Left Wing of the Japanese Communist Party to form the United Red Army, a separate group from Shigenobu's JRA. Upon hearing about the internal purge the United Red Army carried out in the winter of 1971–1972, Shigenobu recalled her shock and sorrow. She and Okudaira wrote My Love, My Revolution (わが愛わが革命) as a response, the title of which was a reference to Mitsuko Tokoro's influential essay collection My Love and Rebellion.

Shigenobu remained in the Middle East for more than 30 years. Her move reflected the concept of "international revolutionary solidarity," with the idea that revolutionary movements should cooperate and eventually lead to a global socialist revolution. She originally joined the Popular Front for the Liberation of Palestine (PFLP) as a volunteer, but eventually the JRA became an independent group. She mentions in several of her books that "the mission's purpose was to consolidate the international revolutionary alliance against the imperialists of the world."

On May 30, 1972, three members of the JRA led by Okudaira carried out the Lod Airport massacre at Lod Airport in Israel. The attackers killed 26 civilians, but one of the attackers was killed by friendly fire, and Okudaira was killed by a mishap with his own grenade. Shigenobu seems to have had advance knowledge of the attack, as she had written to friends in Japan advising them to be on the lookout for a "historic event" in the revolutionary struggle to take place in May 1972.

On March 1, 1973, in Beirut, Lebanon, Shigenobu gave birth to her first and only daughter, Mei Shigenobu. The identity of the father remains a secret to the public, with it being reported that he was a militant for the Popular Front for the Liberation of Palestine. Shigenobu has since written a book about her relationship with her daughter.

On July 20, 1973, a group of hijackers led by JRA member Osamu Maruoka hijacked Japan Air Lines Flight 404 en route from Paris to Tokyo, demanding the release of JRA prisoners held by Israel and the Japanese government. When both governments refused their demands, they flew the plane to Libya where they blew up the 747 aircraft on the tarmac as a symbolic victory. The hijackers were arrested by Libyan dictator Muammar Gaddafi but Shigenobu negotiated their release in 1974.

On September 13, 1974, three JRA members stormed the French embassy in The Hague, taking the ambassador and ten other people hostage, to demand the release of a fellow JRA member. A five-day standoff with police resulted in the release of the JRA member requested by the hostage-takers, the safe release of the hostages, and a safe flight out of the Netherlands for the attackers. Following the attack, Shigenobu was listed as a wanted person by the Interpol.

On August 5, 1975, five JRA militants stormed the American Insurance Associates Building in Kuala Lumpur, Malaysia, taking more than 50 hostages, including the United States consul and the Swedish chargé d'affaires. The hostage takers demanded the release of seven Red Army prisoners in Japan, to which the Japanese government felt forced to comply (although two of the seven later refused to be released).

Similarly in 1977, five JRA militants hijacked Japan Airlines Flight 472 over India and forced it to land in Dhaka, Bangladesh, forcing the Japanese Government to free six imprisoned members of the group and pay a $6M ransom.

Following the Israeli invasion of Lebanon in 1978, Shigenobu and other militants were forced to flee to Libya. Thereafter, Shigenobu issued statements saying that the JRA would henceforce renounce "terror" tactics and pursue legal means. Nevertheless, JRA members continued to become involved in violent incidents, including car bombing the Canadian embassy and firing mortar rounds at the American and Japanese embassies in Jakarta in 1986, and similar attacks against the American and in Rome in 1987, as well as a rocket attack on the US ambassador in Madrid that same year. Shigenobu herself was also connected to the kidnapping of a Japanese businessman in the Philippines in 1986.

The final JRA-linked attack occurred on April 14, 1988, when a powerful car bomb exploded outside the United Service Organizations (USO) military recreational club in downtown Naples, Italy, killing five people (only one of them an American), and injuring 15 others. The attack was carried out by JRA member Junzō Okudaira (the younger brother of Shigenobu's deceased husband Tsuyoshi Okudaira), and occurred on the second anniversary of the 1986 United States bombing of Libya, where Shigenobu and the other JRA members were then residing under Colonel Gaddafi's protection.

== Arrest ==
Shigenobu was arrested on November 8, 2000, outside a hotel in Takatsuki, Osaka Prefecture, after entering Japan illegally through Kansai International Airport using a forged passport that she obtained by impersonating another person some time between 1997 and 2000. The same day she was transported to Tokyo to be interrogated by the Metropolitan Police Department although it was reported that she refused to answer any of her interrogators' questions.

In April 2001, while imprisoned awaiting trial, Shigenobu formally disbanded the Japanese Red Army in a statement to the press faxed from her prison.

== Trial ==
After a lengthy trial, Shigenobu was sentenced to 20 years in prison on March 8, 2006.

The prosecution charged her on three counts, the use of forged passport, aiding another member in the JRA in obtaining a forged passport, and attempted manslaughter by planning and commanding the 1974 occupation and hostage taking at the French embassy in The Hague, the Netherlands. Shigenobu pleaded guilty to the first two charges, but not guilty to the charge linking her to the 1974 embassy hostage taking. Among the witnesses that appeared in her court for the defense was Leila Khaled, known for the 1969 hijacking of TWA Flight 840, and currently a member of the Palestinian National Council.

Prosecutors argued that the Japanese Red Army issued a statement the day after the Hague attack and asked the Palestinian Liberation People's Front (PFLP) in other Japanese Red Army publications to coordinate with them. Based on the testimonies of former JRA members, who testified that Shigenobu had scolded them for lack of preparation at a meeting after the incident, and accused her of masterminding the attack, prosecutors sought a sentence of life imprisonment.

In response to these charges, Samidoun, the Palestinian Prisoner Solidarity Network, argued that the prosecutors lacked evidence for Shigenobu's direct involvement and relied on "forced" confessions which were retracted at the time of the trial. Shigenobu herself maintained her innocence in the French embassy incident.

In his final verdict, Judge Hironobu Murakami of Tokyo District Court found on February 23, 2006, that Shigenobu "played an important role in asking cooperating organizations to procure weapons and coordinate with countries that accept released compatriots." However, Murakami stated that there was no conclusive evidence of her involvement in the armed occupation of the embassy that resulted in the injury of two policemen, or in the intention of attempted manslaughter. Therefore the judge ruled that "a sentence of life imprisonment is too heavy," because while Shigenobu was a leader she did not control the entire organization. However, the judge did find Shigenobu guilty of the lesser charge of conspiring with others to attack the embassy, and sentenced her to 20 years in prison on March 8, 2006.

== Appeals and imprisonment ==
Shigenobu's daughter Mei Shigenobu and chief attorney Kyoko Otani filed an appeal on the same day as Shigenobu's sentencing.

On December 20, 2007, the Tokyo High Court upheld the lower court's decision and dismissed the appeal.

Shigenobu filed another appeal, but on July 15, 2010, the decision was made to reject it and the sentence was confirmed.

Shigenobu filed an objection to the decision to reject the appeal, but on August 4, 2010, the Supreme Court of Japan's No. 2 Small Court (Yukio Takeuchi, Chief Justice presiding) rejected Shigenobu's final appeal, and the sentence of 20 years in prison was finalized.

However, as Shigenobu had already served 810 days in prison, her sentence was reduced by time served to 17 years and Shigenobu's release was planned for 2022.

== Life in prison ==
In 2001, Shigenobu formally announced the dissolution of the Red Army from her prison cell and proclaimed the armed struggle over. She declared,

If I am released I will continue the fight, but through peaceful means. The armed struggle was closely related to historical circumstances, and what is right in one time and place may not be right in another.

At a press conference before her sentencing in February 2006, her lawyers read out a haiku she had composed, reading:

This verdict is not the end.
It is only the beginning.
Strong will shall keep spreading.

In 2008, Shigenobu was diagnosed with both colon cancer and intestinal cancer and has had several operations to remove them. As of 2014 Shigenobu was detained in Hachioji Medical Prison where she was recovering from her medical procedures.

In June 2009, in an extremely rare interview with the Sankei Shimbun, Shigenobu said of her past activities, "We were just university students. We thought we knew everything. We thought we were going to change the world. We didn't realize that in fact we were just causing trouble for everyone."

Shigenobu added,

We only resorted to armed struggle because the movement had stalled. Although similar student movements were taking place all around the world, not all of them resorted to armed struggle. Some people went back to their home towns and continued the movement at the local level. People have friends and family in their home towns, people who can help them out and restrain them if they start to go too far. If we had gone back to our home towns and continued the movement there, we might have gotten different results.

== Release ==
On May 28, 2022, Shigenobu was released from prison in Tokyo, met by a small crowd of supporters and a banner reading, "We love Fusako". Shigenobu commented that she would be focusing on her cancer treatment, explaining she would not be able to "contribute to society" given her condition, stating that she would continue to reflect on her past and "live more and more with curiosity." The Tokyo Metropolitan Police said that she would be placed under surveillance after her release.

== In popular culture ==
- Eileen MacDonald's 1991 book Shoot the Women First mistakenly conflates Shigenobu with Hiroko Nagata, attributing to her the actions of Nagata at the United Red Army purge of 1971–1972.
- The actress Anri Ban portrayed her in the Kōji Wakamatsu film United Red Army (2007).
- In 2008, artist Anicka Yi and architect Maggie Peng created a perfume dedicated to Shigenobu, called Shigenobu Twilight.
- In 2010, Shigenobu and her daughter Mei were featured in the documentary Children of the Revolution, which premiered at the International Documentary Film Festival Amsterdam.
- In Gen Del Raye's short story collection, Boundless Deep, and Other Stories (University of Nebraska Press, 2023), the story titled ″My Father and Shigenobu Fusako in the Hallway of the Hotel New Otani, 1980″ describes a fictional encounter between the narrator's father and Shigenobu Fusako in New Hotel Otani in 1980 when she was allegedly in Beirut.

== Publications ==
- 1974: My Love, My Revolution『わが愛わが革命』 Kodansha.
- 1983: 『十年目の眼差から』 話の特集、ISBN 4826400667
- 1984: If You Put Your Ear to the Earth, You Can Hear the Sound of Japan: Lessons from The Japanese Communist Movement 『大地に耳をつければ日本の音がする 日本共産主義運動の教訓』ウニタ書舗、ISBN 4750584096
- 1984: Beirut, Summer 1982 『ベイルート1982年夏』話の特集、ISBN 4826400829
- 1985: Materials: Reports from the Middle East 1 『資料・中東レポート』1（日本赤軍との共編著）、ウニタ書舗、
- 1986: Materials: Reports from the Middle East 2 『資料・中東レポート』2（日本赤軍との共編著）、ウニタ書舗、
- 2001: I Decided to Give Birth to You Under an Apple Tree 『りんごの木の下であなたを産もうと決めた』幻冬舎、ISBN 434400082X
- 2005: Jasmine in the Muzzle of a Gun: Collected Poems of Shigenobu Fusako 『ジャスミンを銃口に 重信房子歌集』幻冬舎、ISBN 4344010159
- 2009: A Personal History of the Japanese Red Army: Together with Palestine 『日本赤軍私史 パレスチナと共に』河出書房新社、ISBN 978-4309244662
- 2012: Season of the Revolution: From the Battlefield in Palestine 『革命の季節 パレスチナの戦場から』幻冬舎、ISBN 9784344023147
- 2022: The Soldiers' Record: Living in Palestine『戦士たちの記録 パレスチナに生きる』幻冬舎、ISBN 9784344039612
- 2022: Poetry Collection: Morning Star『歌集 暁の星』皓星社、ISBN 9784774407654
- 2023: Days of a Twenty-year-old: The 1960s and Me 『はたちの時代 60年代と私』太田出版、ISBN 9784778318697
- 2024: History of Palestinian Liberation Struggles 1916–2024 『パレスチナ解放闘争史 1916-2024』作品社、ISBN 9784867930182

== See also ==
- Japanese Red Army
- Red Army Faction (Japan)
- Anti-Japaneseism
- East Asia Anti-Japan Armed Front
- Japan Revolutionary Communist League (Revolutionary Marxist Faction)
- Revolutionary Communist League, National Committee
- Zengakuren
