= Kōzō Okamoto =

Japanese Red Army member (1947–2026)

- 岡本 公三
- Kōzō Okamoto (left) and Fusako Shigenobu, leader of the Japanese Red Army, at a press conference
- Born: 7 December 1947; Kumamoto, Japan
- Died: 23 July 2026 (aged 78); Beirut, Lebanon
- Other names: Ahmad al-Yabani, Ahmad the Japanese (PFLP nicknames)
- Years active: 1970–1972
- Organization: Japanese Red Army
- Known for: Lod Airport massacre
- Criminal charges: Possessing and discharging firearms and grenades (3 counts); Serving an unlawful organization
- Criminal penalty: 3 life sentences and an additional 10 years imprisonment
- Criminal status: Released in 1985

Kōzō Okamoto (Japanese: 岡本 公三, Hepburn: Okamoto Kōzō; IPA: [o̞ka̠mo̞to̞ ko̞ːzo̞ː]; 7 December 1947 – 23 July 2026) was a Japanese communist militant and a member of the Japanese Red Army (JRA), responsible for the massacre of 26 passengers at Ben-Gurion International Airport in Israel in 1972.

While at university, Okamoto was introduced to the Red Army Faction (the precursor organization to the JRA) by his brother, a member of the group. He later traveled to Beirut, Lebanon, where he received military training by the Popular Front for the Liberation of Palestine (PFLP) and was selected to carry out the Lod Airport massacre. He was the sole survivor of the three perpetrators. After his arrest by Israeli forces, Okamoto was sentenced to three life sentences, but was released in the 1985 Jibril Agreement after serving 13 years. He would later move to Lebanon, where he spent three years in prison on false visa charges before being granted asylum, despite a Japanese extradition request.

== Early life and recruitment ==
Okamoto was born on 7 December 1947 in Kumamoto as the youngest child of six children. His father was a school principal, and his mother was a teacher who died from cancer in 1966. His older brother was Takeshi Okamoto, a member of the Red Army Faction, which hijacked an airliner in March 1970 to North Korea. After failing entrance exams to get into Kyoto University, where two of his older brothers had been studying, Okamoto enrolled in Kagoshima University, where he participated in protests against the Vietnam War. He was a 24-year-old botany student when he was recruited to the Japanese Red Army.

In 1970, Okamoto traveled to Fukuoka at Takeshi's request, where he first made contact with the nascent Red Army Faction. The following month, he visited Red Army representatives in Tokyo. In 1971, he was instructed to prepare a room for the screening of the film "Declaration of World War by the Red Army and PFLP", his first task from the group. In September that year, he was offered to receive military training in Beirut by a Red Army member. Following the Asama-Sansō incident in February 1972, he was told to leave for Beirut as quickly as possible. Upon arrival, he met with Yasuyuki Yasuda, Tsuyoshi Okudaira, and an unnamed fourth Japanese national and underwent seven weeks of weapons training by the Popular Front for the Liberation of Palestine (PFLP). On the seventh week, he was informed of the plan to attack Lod Airport (now Ben Gurion Airport) in Tel Aviv.

== Lod Airport massacre ==
After a few days of training for the massacre, Okamoto, Yasuda, and Okudaira took a roundabout flight to western Europe, specifically Frankfurt and then Rome. They were provided false passports on the way. The name in Okamoto's forged passport was Daisuke Namba, Crown Prince Hirohito's 1923 would-be assassin. On the morning of 30 May 1972, Okamoto had a Czech assault rifle and two grenades placed into his suitcase at a hotel in Rome. Later that afternoon, the trio boarded Air France Flight 132, which was en route to Tokyo with a layover in Tel Aviv. After disembarking from the plane at Lod Airport, the three members of the JRA proceeded to the baggage claim area. Upon retrieving their luggage, they took out submachine guns and grenades packed inside the suitcases and opened fire on other passengers in the terminal.

The attack was a joint operation of the Popular Front for the Liberation of Palestine – External Operations (PFLP-EO), and the Japanese Red Army. The perpetrators were chosen by the PFLP-EO's chief, Wadie Haddad, due to their perceived readiness and because the Japanese militant group had attracted little international attention, reducing suspicion.

Okamoto and his comrades killed 26 people and wounded 80 more. Seventeen of the victims were Christian pilgrims from Puerto Rico.

Yasuyuki Yasuda was accidentally shot dead by one of the other attackers. Tsuyoshi Okudaira was killed by one of his own grenades, either due to premature detonation or a suicide. Kōzō Okamoto was wounded and captured trying to escape the terminal.

== Trial and release ==
Okamoto was put on trial in an Israeli military court under the 1948 Emergency Regulations. His court-appointed lawyers were Max Kritzman and David Rotlevy; Kritzman, who was chief lawyer, had experience defending Israelis charged under the Emergency Regulations. Of Okamoto, he complained that "this man will not cooperate". Okamoto's attorney said that he was not mentally competent during the massacre, a claim rejected by the court. The Israeli government weighed seeking the death penalty for him, but ultimately chose not to. Okamoto's father sent a letter to the Israeli embassy in Japan asking for his son to be given the death sentence. Okamoto would plead guilty. In his final statement Okamoto told the court: "When I was a child, I was told that when people died they became stars...We three Red Army soldiers wanted to become Orion when we died".

Okamoto was convicted on three counts of possessing and discharging firearms and grenades and another count of serving an unlawful organization—the PFLP—and sentenced to three life sentences in Israel. During the incarceration, he requested to convert to Judaism and tried to circumcise himself with nail clippers. He stated that he was tortured during his imprisonment, being "forced to eat like a dog", and emerged from imprisonment emaciated.

On 20 July 1973, PFLP and JRA operatives hijacked Japan Air Lines Flight 404, demanding Okamoto's release in exchange for the hostages on board; Israel refused to comply. Okamoto was released in 1985 after 13 years in prison, as part of the Jibril Agreement, a prisoner exchange with Palestinian militant factions for captive Israeli soldiers. After his release from prison in Israel, Kōzō Okamoto moved to Libya, then Syria, and finally to Lebanon where he reunited with other members of the Japanese Red Army.

== Asylum in Lebanon ==
On 15 February 1997, Lebanon detained five Red Army members, Haruo Wakō, Masao Adachi, Mariko Yamamoto, Kazuo Tohira, and Okamoto for using forged passports and visa violations. Okamoto had spent years living at Red Army camps in the Beqaa Valley. They were sentenced to three years in prison. The sentence was passed by Judge Soheil Abdul-Shams on 31 July 1997. After their prison term was completed, the four other members of the JRA were forcibly deported to Jordan and from Amman, Jordan via a chartered Russian plane to Japan. The Lebanese government, however, granted political asylum to Okamoto because, according to the Lebanese government, he "had participated in resistance operations against Israel and had been tortured in Israeli jails".

Okamoto was still wanted by the Japanese police and Japan had requested his extradition. He was also placed on an Interpol wanted list by the Japanese police as a murder suspect. During his asylum in Lebanon, Okamoto converted to Islam. As of 2016, he was reported to be living in a refugee camp near Beirut. He lived mostly in hiding, rarely making public appearances. He would receive limited information about the outside world and was given meals at scheduled times as well as a daily supply of cigarettes. He spent hours watching cartoons such as Tom and Jerry, and was cared for by Abu Yusef, a PFLP official. In May 2017, Okamoto gave an interview to the Mainichi Shimbun in Beirut. He said "I want to return to Japan once". On 30 May 2022, Okamoto appeared at a ceremony in Beirut marking the 50th anniversary of the attack, laying a wreath on the graves of his fellow JRA militants and posing for photos with PFLP supporters, in what would be his last public appearance.

On 23 July 2026, the PFLP announced that Okamoto had died that day after suffering from a longtime illness in the Dahieh suburb of Beirut, at the age of 78. At the time of his death, he was still wanted in Japan, while remaining something of a folk hero in Lebanon's Palestinian refugee camps. Following funeral services attended by PFLP members and supporters, he was buried at the Martyrs’ Cemetery of the Palestinian Revolution in Beirut.

== See also ==
- Aharon Katzir, recipient of the Israeli Prize in life science, one of the Lod Airport massacre victims
- Fusako Shigenobu, leader of the Japanese Red Army
