= Shigenobu =

Shigenobu is a Japanese name. It is usually a male given name but can be a surname or the name of a place. As with most personal names, the meaning of the name is derived from which kanji (Chinese characters) are used, and there are several different kanji that are pronounced "shige" and a few which can be pronounced "nobu."

== Possible spellings ==
- 重信 – "heavy faith"
- 重靖 – "heavy diligence"
- 重陳 – "heavy maturity"
- 茂信 – "abundant faith"
- 茂伸 – "abundantly influential"
- 繁信 – "abundant faith"
- 繫信 – "joined in faith"
- 薫信 – "aroma of faith"
- 滋信 – "nourishing faith"
- 滋延 – "nourishing longevity"

=== Phonetic spelling ===
The following are spellings of the name "Shigenobu" in the two phonetic syllabaries of written Japanese, and thus have no intrinsic meaning:

- しげのぶ
- シゲノブ

== People ==
=== Surname ===
- Fusako Shigenobu (重信 房子, born 1945), a leader of the Japanese Red Army
- Mei Shigenobu (重信 メイ, born 1973), the daughter of Fusako Shigenobu
- Shinnosuke Shigenobu (重信 慎之介, born 1993), Japanese baseball player

=== Male ===
- Maeda Shigenobu (前田 重靖, 1735–1753), a Japanese daimyō
- Yanagawa Shigenobu (柳川 重信, 1787–1832), a Japanese ukiyo-e artist
- Nishimura Shigenobu (西村 重信, fl. 1730s–40s), a Japanese ukiyo-e artist who may have been Ishikawa Toyonobu
- Utagawa Shigenobu (歌川 広重, 1829–1869), an ukiyo-e artist better known as Hiroshige II
- Ōkuma Shigenobu (大隈 重信, 1838–1922), a Japanese statesman
- Shigenobu Katakura (片倉 重信, born 1940), a Japanese religious leader
- Shigenobu Nakamura (中村 滋延, born 1950), a Japanese composer and music teacher
- Shigenobu Murofushi (室伏 重信, born 1945), a Japanese athlete

== See also ==
- Shigenobu, Ehime, a town in Japan
