= Japanese people in North Korea =

Japanese people in North Korea are people of Japanese descent living in North Korea. They consist mainly of four groups: prisoners-of-war in the Soviet Union, Japanese accompanying repatriating Zainichi Korean spouses, defectors, and kidnapping victims. The number who remain alive is not known.

== Background ==
In 1945, with the end of World War II and the collapse of the Empire of Japan, 200,000 Japanese colonists were stranded north of the 38th parallel; however, they were repatriated to Japan soon after. The earliest and largest post-war influx of Japanese to North Korea was involuntary: 27,000 prisoners-of-war from the Soviet Union. Their current whereabouts are unknown; documents from Russian archives suggest that only the physically ill were sent to North Korea, while able-bodied men were retained by the Soviets to perform forced labor there.

== Spouses of repatriating Zainichi Koreans ==
Voluntary migration of Japanese to North Korea began in 1959, under a repatriation campaign for Zainichi Koreans sponsored by ethnic activist organisation and de facto North Korean embassy Chongryon. Chongryon received the tacit support of the Japanese and American governments, who saw Koreans in Japan as "Communists" and "criminals", in the words of the US ambassador to Japan at the time, Douglas MacArthur II; they welcomed the repatriation campaign as a way of reducing the ethnic minority population. In total, 6,637 Japanese people are estimated to have accompanied Korean spouses to North Korea, of whom 1,828 retained their Japanese nationality. The numbers of both Japanese and Koreans going to North Korea dropped sharply in the 1960s as knowledge of the poor economic conditions, social discrimination, and political repression faced by both Korean and Japanese migrants filtered back to Japan by word of mouth.

According to North Korean defector Kang Chol-Hwan, himself the son of participants in the repatriation campaign, Japanese wives of North Korean men led Pyongyang's first anti-government demonstration in North Korean history, when they staged a protest appealing for permission to return home. Kang also relayed an anecdote about Kim Il Sung being shocked when one Japanese woman showed up when he was making a "spot visit" to a mine in South Hamgyong Province and personally begged to him to be allowed to go back to Japan. These two events are said to have been the impetus for the 1970s purges of migrants from Japan, in which many Chongryon members and their families were sent to detention camps or killed. Two-thirds of the Japanese who migrated to North Korea are estimated to have gone missing or have never been heard from. However, in spite of the harsh political situation, migration to North Korea did not stop completely until 1984. As of 1997, North Korea had refused to provide Japan with a list of surviving Japanese in the country, and had only permitted a few small groups of 10–15 to travel to Japan. They further objected to the Japanese practice of referring to such trips as "visits home", instead preferring to call them "temporary visitors" or even "government delegations".

== Defections and kidnappings ==
The nine members of the Japanese Communist League's Red Army Faction (the predecessor of the Japanese Red Army) who hijacked Japan Airlines Flight 351 are known to have received political asylum in Pyongyang in 1970; of those, two were later arrested by Japanese police in Thailand, two died in North Korea, and five are still believed to reside in Pyongyang. Four were confirmed to be alive in 2004 when they were interviewed and photographed by Kyodo News.

North Korea is also believed to have kidnapped between 70 and 80 Japanese citizens between 1977 and 1983 in order to teach the Japanese language to North Korean intelligence operatives; however, the government of North Korea officially admits to only 16 such kidnappings.

In 2003, Kazumi Kitagawa, a Japanese citizen and former member of Aum Shinrikyo, jumped overboard from a Chinese tourist boat on the Yalu River and swam to North Korea where she requested asylum. Her actions made her the first Japanese defector to North Korea since the Flight 351 hijacking. However, after two years of living in a hotel where she reportedly had complaints about her hotel room, clothing, and constant surveillance by guards, she arranged to be returned to Japan.

== See also ==
- Japan–North Korea relations
- Kenji Fujimoto
- Japanese people in South Korea
