= Asama-Sansō incident =

1972 hostage crisis and police siege in Japan

- The Asama-Sansō lodge surrounded by police during the incident
- Date: February 19 – 28, 1972
- Location: Karuizawa, Nagano, Japan; 36°17′20.93″N 138°37′19.38″E
- Result: Hostage rescued

Parties
Japan: Nagano Prefectural Police	United Red Army

Number
1,500 officers 1 armored crane Several armored cars	5

Casualties and losses
2 killed 26 wounded	1 wounded 5 arrested
- 1 civilian killed, 1 civilian wounded

The Asama-Sansō incident (あさま山荘事件, Asama sansō jiken) was a hostage crisis and police standoff at a mountain lodge near Karuizawa in Nagano Prefecture, Japan, which lasted from February 19 to February 28, 1972. The police rescue operation on the final day of the standoff was the first marathon live television broadcast in Japan, lasting 10 hours and 40 minutes.

The incident began when five armed members of the United Red Army (URA), following a bloody purge that left fourteen members of the group plus one bystander dead, broke into a holiday lodge below Mount Asama, taking the wife of the lodge-keeper as a hostage. A standoff between Japanese police and the URA radicals took place, lasting ten days. The lodge was a natural fortress, solidly constructed of thick concrete on a steep hillside with only one entrance, which, along with their guns, enabled the hostage-takers to keep police at a distance.

On February 28, the police stormed the lodge. Two police officers were killed in the assault, the hostage was rescued and the URA radicals were taken into custody. The incident contributed to a decline in popularity of leftist movements in Japan.

== Background ==
=== Overview ===
In the 1960s, leftist student movements pervaded Japan's universities, as similar movements did in the West. By the latter half of the decade, these movements had become very factionalized, competitive, and violent. After a series of incidents in which leftist student groups injured or killed law enforcement officials and civilians, the National Police Agency cracked down on these groups, raiding their hideouts and arresting dozens in 1971 and 1972. Attempting to conceal themselves from the police, a core group of radicals from the United Red Army (URA) retreated to a compound in Gunma Prefecture during the winter of 1972.

=== Obtaining guns and cash ===
The two groups that later merged into the United Red Army independently carried out violent acts in early 1971. The Keihin Anti-Security Treaty Joint Struggle Group, led by Hiroko Nagata and Hiroshi Sakaguchi, raided a gun shop in Mooka (Tochigi Prefecture) on February 17, acquiring 9 shotguns, 1 rifle, 1 airgun, and 2300 rounds of ammunition. Panicked by the prompt response of the police, most raiders escaped by car but two were left behind; once arrested, they identified the culprits, resulting in Nagata, Sakaguchi, and the others being placed on the wanted list.

Separately, the Red Army Faction led by Tsuneo Mori, and including Kunio Bandō (who is still at large), carried out a series of robberies—4 banks, 3 post offices, and an elementary school—over the period February 22 to July 23, 1971 (referred to by police as "Operation M", for "money"). At the time, leftist student demonstrations were losing momentum, but other than a few journalists and security specialists, no one had heard of these groups before.

=== Mountain hide-outs ===
The police launched a nationwide manhunt, making it impossible for perpetrators to hide, even in distant cities such as Sapporo and Kyoto; both groups decided to converge in the mountainous area of NW Gunma Prefecture. The Keihin Group went to the mountainous area of Gunma Prefecture and set up agitpunkt (agitation points; an aggressive name for a hide-out), collectively the "mountain base" (separate bases on the slopes of Mount Haruna, Mount Kasho, and Mount Myōgi). Separately, the Red Army Faction left the cities and set up an agitpunkt in Yamanashi Prefecture (the Niikura Base). Using funds from the robberies, the URA purchased weapons from the Keihin Group, and in early December 1971 the first joint military exercises were held between the two groups (29 members total). However, a faction emerged within the Keihin Group that resisted integration. On 18 December, radio news announced that Shibano Haruhiko, a member of the Keihin group still in the Tokyo area, had been shot to death during an assault on a police station in Itabashi. On 20 December, the first leadership conference of the combined groups was held at the Haruna base of the Keihin Group. The leaders knew that the police were aware of their general location, and it would be difficult to leave the mountains. Without hope of outside help or escape, in late 1971, the leaders of the two factions, Mori and Nagata, planned a "annihilation operation" (殲滅戦, senmetsusen) which required an ideological review process of criticism and self-criticism of all members.

=== Internal purge ===
It was at the Gunma compound, on the second week of February 1972, that URA chairman Tsuneo Mori and vice-chairman Hiroko Nagata initiated a violent purge of the group. Nagata and Mori directed the deaths by beating of eight URA members, as well as one non-member who happened to be present. Six other members were tied to trees outside, where they froze to death in the frigid weather. On February 16, police arrested Mori, Nagata, and six other URA members at either the compound or at a nearby village. Five others, armed with rifles and shotguns, managed to escape, fleeing on foot through the mountains towards the community of Karuizawa in nearby Nagano Prefecture. These five fugitives were Kunio Bandō (25), a graduate of Kyoto University; Masakuni Yoshino (23), a senior at Yokohama National University; Hiroshi Sakaguchi (25) a dropout of Tokyo Suisan University; Jirō Katō (19), and his brother Saburō Katō (16).

== Incident ==
Sighting the police pursuit near Karuizawa on February 19, the five radicals took refuge in a vacation lodge called Asama Sansō (Asama Mountain Villa) owned by Kawai Musical Instruments Manufacturing. The radicals entered the lodge and discovered Yasuko Muta, the 31-year-old wife of the lodge's caretaker. She was the only person in the building, as her husband was walking the dog and the lodge's guests had gone ice skating. The radicals took Muta hostage at gunpoint and barricaded the building.

The structure of the lodge, named after nearby Mount Asama, made it a stronghold: it was a three-story wood and concrete edifice built into the side of the hill atop an exposed base of steel-reinforced concrete. The upper floor was slightly larger than the two below, giving the lodge a mushroom appearance. The lodge towered over the steep, snow-covered slopes below and its windows had heavy outer storm shutters. The building's maze-like floor plan and narrow staircases made it easy for the defenders to block off movement inside. The radicals would spend most of their time on the uppermost floor, which contained a kitchen, dining room, tatami-mat sleeping room, and a commanding view of the surrounding valley and hills. The radicals placed large pieces of furniture and futon bedding around the doors and windows and secured them in place with wire.

When Muta's husband returned and saw the barricades, he realized what had happened and quickly notified police. The police immediately set up roadblocks and surrounded the lodge to cut off any avenues of escape for the radicals inside. The police initially decided to wait and see if the radicals would surrender on their own. After three days without a surrender offer from the hostage-takers, the police shut off the electricity to the lodge and set up loudspeakers from which the parents of several of the radicals implored them to surrender, to no avail. One of the participating parent's son had been killed in the purge incident, but both the police and the parent were unaware of this because the full extent of the purge had not yet become known.

On February 25, a police tactical team (the Riot Police Unit of the Nagano PPH, with the support of the Tokyo Metropolitan Police Department, Kanagawa PPH, and Yamanashi PPH) began preparations to assault the lodge. A crane equipped with a wrecking ball and an armored driver's compartment was positioned near the building and police armed themselves with ladders, heavy mallets, and chainsaws. Muta's husband implored the radicals by loudspeaker to release his wife, but was ignored. On February 27, the police used a baseball pitching machine to bombard the building with rocks to keep the hostage-takers awake all night.

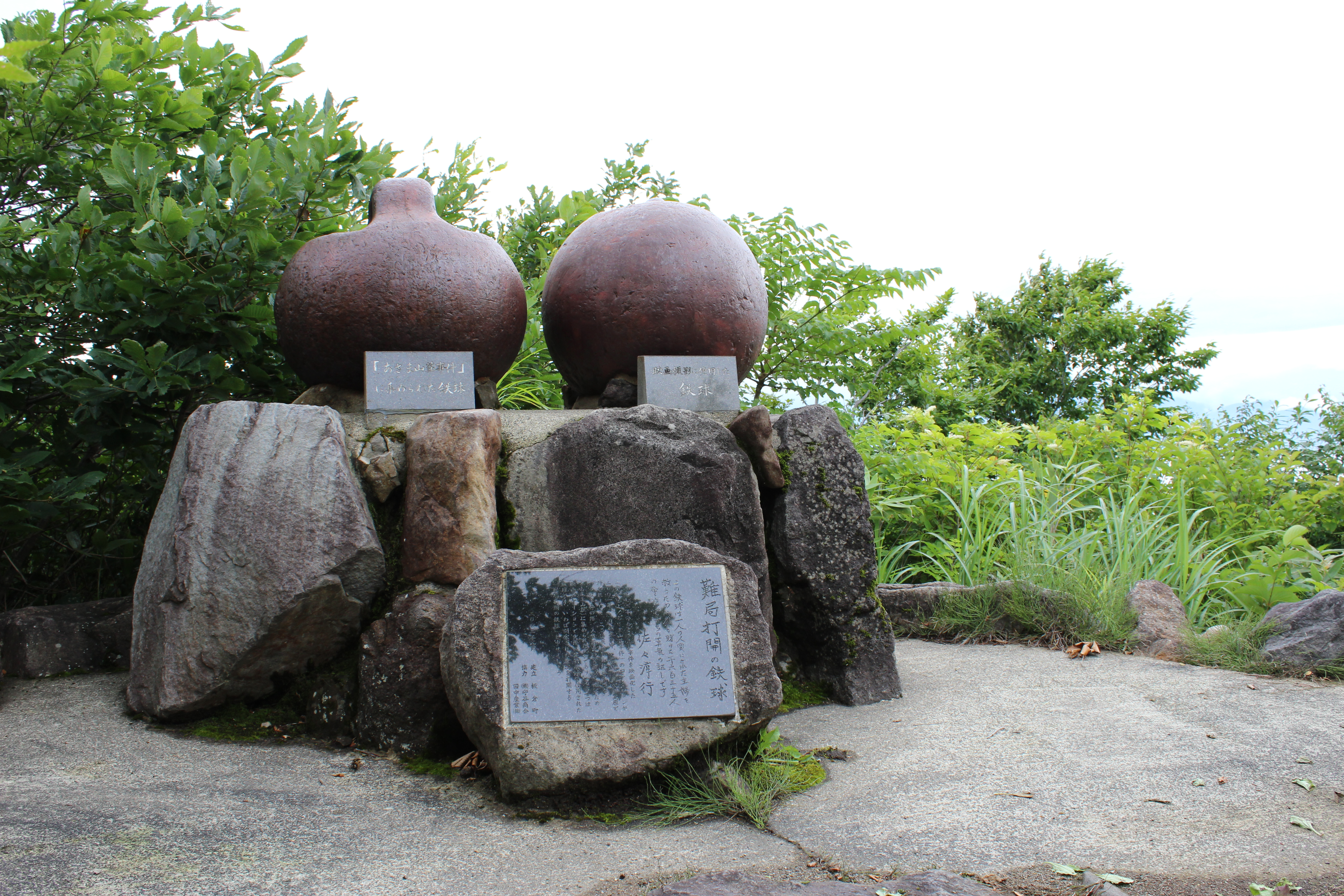
The wrecking balls used by police to breach the lodge during the incident, now displayed in the area with a commemorative plaque

The police moved into position for the assault at 8 a.m. on February 28 and issued a final ultimatum an hour later, which went unheeded by the radicals. At 10 a.m. the crane began to batter the lodge's walls with the wrecking ball. The police cautiously approached the building and began to break through the barricades. By noon, the police had occupied the two lower floors, isolating the radicals and Muta on the top floor.

The police experienced difficulty in breaching the radicals' defenses on the top floor, and hours later had not made much headway. They directed high-pressure water hoses at the top floor, gouging out large holes in the building's walls and drenching the radicals and Muta with cold water. During this time, the radicals kept up continuous gunfire on the assaulting police and threw homemade bombs at them. Two policemen, Inspector Shigemitsu Takami (42) and Superintendent Hisataka Uchida (47) were shot and killed and fifteen other policemen were injured. A civilian observer who intruded into the area without police permission was also shot, reportedly by the radicals, and fatally wounded.

As darkness fell, the police breached the top floor's barricades and captured one of the Katō brothers. The remaining four radicals burrowed into a pile of futon bedding and refused to surrender. As the police approached them, Bandō shot one of the policemen, Masahiro Endō, in the eye. Endō lost his eye but survived. Eventually, at 6:15 p.m., 280 hours after the incident began, the remaining four radicals were taken into custody and Muta was rescued. Muta was cold but uninjured and told police that her captors had not mistreated her, although they had tied her to a bed during most of the standoff. That same evening, despondent over his son's behavior, Bandō's father hanged himself in his home in Ōtsu, a city near Kyoto.

== Media coverage ==
At 9:40 a.m. on February 28, public broadcaster NHK began live, continuous coverage of the siege that lasted until 8:20 p.m. that night. Ratings for NHK's coverage averaged 50.8% and peaked at 89.7% at 6:26 p.m. Vehicle traffic was noticeably lighter throughout the day in Tokyo. Media coverage showing police officers consuming cup noodles is attributed to have popularized instant noodles as an emergency food in Japan.

== Aftermath ==
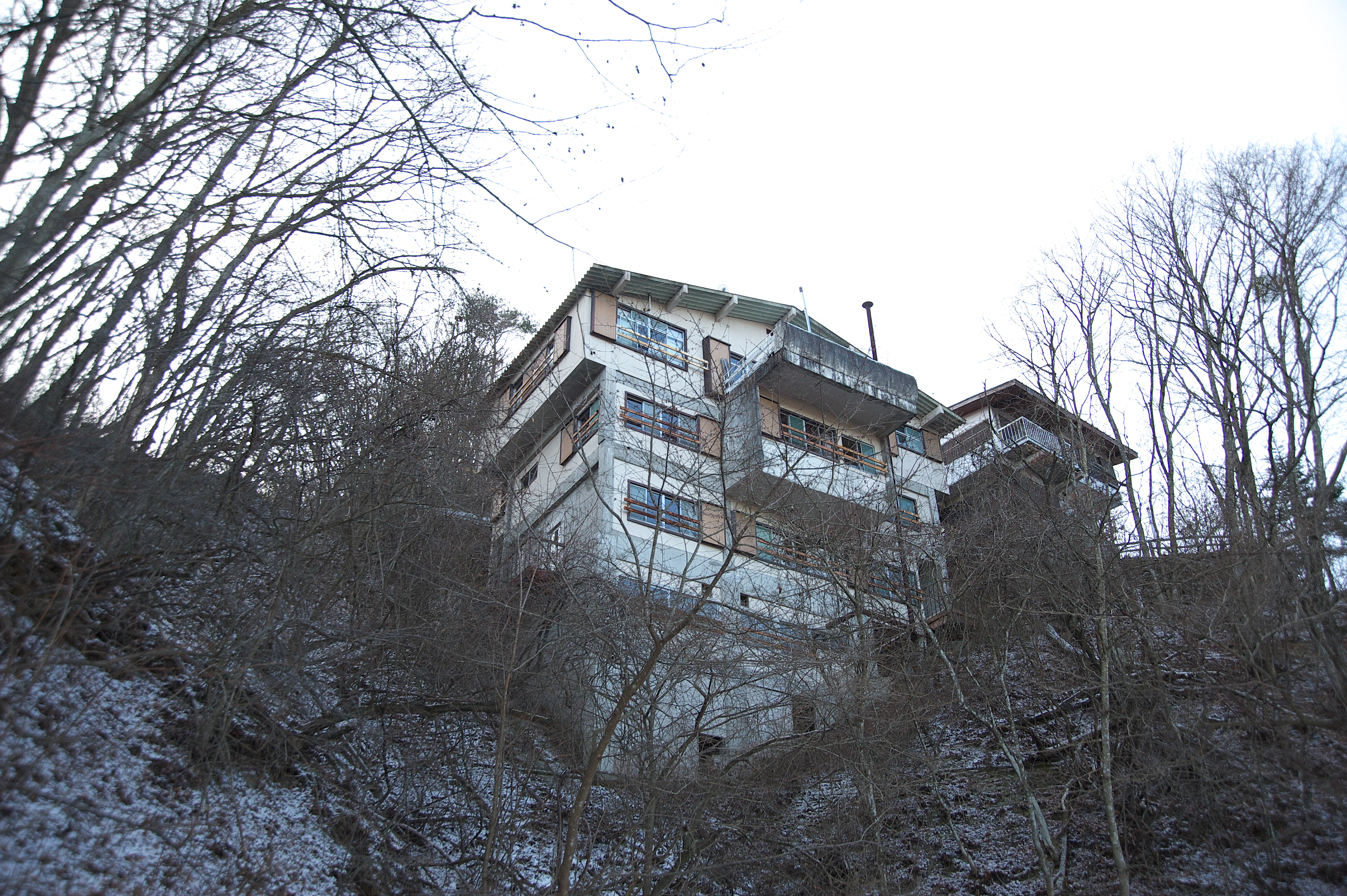
Asama-Sansō (2009)

The five radicals were charged on six counts: two murders, one attempted murder, obstructing police in the execution of their duties, violation of the Firearm and Sword Possession Control Law, and illegal confinement. Four were sentenced to long prison terms and Sakaguchi was sentenced to death. On 24 June 2013, the Supreme Court of Japan rejected an appeal from Sakaguchi for a retrial, leaving him on death row awaiting execution.

Of the three Katō brothers, the eldest died during the internal group "review process" (purge), the second (aged 19 when arrested) was sentenced to 13 years hard labor, and the youngest (16 when arrested) was sent to reform school.

On August 8, 1975, the Japanese government released Bandō and flew him to asylum in Libya in response to demands from Japanese Red Army members who had stormed the U.S. and Swedish embassies in Kuala Lumpur, Malaysia and taken 53 hostages. Bandō later is believed to have assisted in the hijacking of Japan Airlines Flight 472 from Paris to Tokyo in 1977, forcing the jet to land in Dhaka. He remains at large and reportedly spent time between 1997 and 2007 in Russia, China, the Philippines, and Japan.

Weekly gossip magazines blamed the hostage Muta for the deaths of the two officers. Quotations from her initial press conference were twisted out of context to make it sound like she had become friends with her captors, and her presence at the funerals for the two officers was denounced in the weeklies as a "hypocrite" shedding "crocodile tears". After the attacks in the press, she refused to speak any further about her ordeal. She remained in the Karuizawa, working at another lodge.

The incident, along with the Lod Airport massacre which occurred several months later and several hijackings, contributed to an intense social backlash amongst the Japanese population against radical student leftist groups. After the hostage incident, the leftist movement in Japan greatly decreased in numbers and enjoyed much less popular support. A 2007 film by Kōji Wakamatsu about the incident, United Red Army, won the Japanese Eyes Best Picture award at the October 2007 Tokyo International Film Festival.
