= Mitsuko Tokoro =

Japanese biologist and New Left activist

- 所 美都子
- Born: January 3, 1939; Fujisawa, Kanagawa prefecture, Japan
- Died: January 27, 1968 (aged 29); Tokyo, Japan
- Other name: Mimie Tomano
- Education: Ochanomizu University
- Occupations: Biologist, activist, political theorist
- Years active: 1960-1968
- Notable work: My Love and Rebellion

Mitsuko Tokoro (所 美都子, Tokoro Mitsuko; January 3, 1939 – January 27, 1968), also known by her pen name Mimie Tomano, was a Japanese biologist and New Left activist remembered as one of the leading theorists of the apolitical and radically anti-hierarchical Zenkyōtō movement that carried out the 1968-69 Japanese student uprisings at universities across Japan.

== Early life and education ==
Tokoro Mitsuko was born in Fujisawa, Kanagawa in 1939. As an undergraduate student at Ochanomizu University, Tokoro participated the massive 1960 Anpo protests against renewal of the U.S.-Japan Security Treaty, and had been present with student activists inside the National Diet compound on June 15 when Michiko Kanba was killed. Although greatly disappointed at the failure of those protests to stop the Security Treaty, Tokoro continued her activism as a graduate student in biology, first at Osaka University and then again at Ochanomizu University, participating in protests against the Japan-South Korea Normalization Treaty in 1965, protests against the docking of the nuclear-powered aircraft carrier U.S.S. Enterprise in Japanese ports, and student protests against the Vietnam War, among others.

In the meantime, Tokoro continued to work toward a doctoral degree in Biology, and was an expert on the kōji mold used in Japan in fermentation processes to make alcohol, soy sauce, and miso. In addition to Japanese language publications in science journals, in 1966, she was the lead author of an English-language article in the Journal of General and Applied Microbiology entitled "Physiological and Biochemical Studies on the Longevity of Aspergillus Oryzae Conidia Stored under Various Environmental Conditions."

== Theorizing Zenkyōtō ==
Following the failure of the Anpo protests, Tokoro steeped herself in the writings of Japanese political theorists, activists, and feminists such as Takaaki Yoshimoto, Gan Tanigawa. Kazue Morisaki, and Itsue Takamure, as well as western thinkers such as Jean-Paul Sartre, Simone de Beauvoir, and Simone Weil. After the Vietnam War started, she joined the Tokyo University Anti-Vietnam War Committee, where she became friends with Yoshitaka Yamamoto and other Tokyo University New Left activists. From her readings and her own personal experiences, Tokoro concluded that the failure of the 1960 Anpo protests lay in the overly hierarchical, repressive, and bureaucratic nature of the Japan Communist Party and other "Old Left" organizations. In particular, Tokoro argued that the JCP's commitment to democratic centralism and what she called "the democracy of aggregation" did not allow space for individuals' needs, viewpoints, and desires.

In her prophetic 1966 essay "The Coming Organization" (予感される組織に寄せて, Yokan sareru soshiki ni yosete), Tokoro called for a leaderless, radically anti-hierarchical, radically egalitarian organization that would ebb and flow according to the needs and desires of its members. Rather than all members being forced to follow the bidding of the central organization, the organization would follow the bidding of its individual members. Tokoro also stressed the importance of debate. She felt that "Old Left" parties and organizations, by their very nature, were designed to stifle debate in the service of producing collective action. Tokoro instead called for "endless debate" (永遠討論, eien tōron). Action would only be pursued once debate had been exhausted and consensus achieved. Even then, dissidents' opinions would be respected; they would not be required to participate and would be welcome to participate only in the part of the action they supported, without fear of expulsion from the group.

== Death and legacy ==
Although Tokoro died on January 27, 1968, from an autoimmune disease, just as the Zenkyōtō movement was getting under way, her ideas were directly put into practice by the founders of the Tokyo University Zenkyōtō that was established in January 1968, and in turn became the model for similarly structured and organized Zenkyōtō at universities all around the nation during the 1968-69 Japanese university protests.

Her fellow students and New Left activists gathered to pay their final respects in a solemn ceremony on January 29, laying the red flag of the Tokyo University Anti-Vietnam War Committee over her coffin. On that very same day, Tokyo University medical students were voting to organize the nascent Zenkyōtō movement that would incorporate many of her ideas and philosophical viewpoints.

Following her death, Tokoro's essays were published in a posthumous collection titled My Love and Rebellion (我が愛と反逆, Waga ai to hangyaku), which became a bible of sorts to the Zenkyōtō and other New Left activist groups. (Note: The title of Tokoro's essay collection would later be referenced by Japanese Red Army founder Fusako Shigenobu in the name of her similarly-titled manifesto My Love, My Revolution.)

Yoshitaka Yamamoto, widely recognized as the de facto leader of the putatively leaderless Zenkyōtō movement, would later declare, "The Zenkyōtō movement began on the day of Mitsuko Tokoro's funeral. The Zenkyōtō movement inherited her approach to life, and it was in the movement that it blossomed."

According to historian Guy Yasko, "Had she lived, Tokoro would certainly have entered the spotlight with Yamamoto, Saishū Satoru, and the rest." (Note: Satoru Saishū was another well-known Zenkyōtō activist and theorist during the 1968-69 Japanese university protests.)
