= Children of the Revolution (2010 film) =

- Directed by: Shane O'Sullivan
- Produced by: Shane O'Sullivan
- Starring: Ulrike Meinhof; Fusako Shigenobu; Mei Shigenobu; Bettina Röhl; Astrid Proll; Masao Adachi; Klaus Rainer Röhl; Leila Khaled; Bassam Abu Sharif; Erika Runge; Takaya Shiomi; Kyoko Ohtani; Jutta Lack-Strecker
- Cinematography: Robin Probyn; Axel Schneppat; Bassem Fayad
- Edited by: Ben Yeates; Fergal McGrath; Shane O'Sullivan
- Music by: Giles Packham (Waveform Studios)
- Distributed by: E2 Films
- Release date: 22 November 2010 (IDFA)
- Running time: 92 minutes
- Countries: Ireland; United Kingdom
- Language: English

Children of the Revolution is a 2010 documentary by Irish filmmaker Shane O'Sullivan about Ulrike Meinhof and Fusako Shigenobu, leaders of the German Red Army Faction and the Japanese Red Army.

The film describes the experiences of Meinhof and Shigenobu through the perspective of their daughters, Mei and Bettina, and uses archive footage of student protests and guerrilla training camps in Germany, Japan and the Middle East.

The film premiered at the International Documentary Film Festival Amsterdam in November 2010 and has screened at several international festivals. It had its broadcast premiere on German channel Westdeutscher Rundfunk on 30 May 2011 and was released on DVD in the United Kingdom in 2011. It was pitched at the 2009 Sheffield Doc/Fest MeetMarket.
