= United Red Army (film) =

2007 film by Kōji Wakamatsu

- Theatrical release poster
- Directed by: Kōji Wakamatsu
- Screenplay by: Masayuki Kakegawa; Kōji Wakamatsu
- Based on: United Red Army by Masayuki Kakegawa
- Produced by: Muneko Ozaki
- Starring: Akie Namiki; Go Jibiki; Maki Sakai; Arata
- Cinematography: Yoshihisa Toda and Tomohiko Tsuji
- Edited by: Takeshi Seyama
- Music by: Jim O'Rourke
- Distributed by: Wakamatsu Productions
- Release dates: August 26, 2007 (Yufuin Film Festival); March 15, 2008 (Japan)
- Running time: 190 minutes
- Country: Japan
- Language: Japanese
- Budget: ¥200 million

United Red Army (実録・連合赤軍 あさま山荘への道程, Jitsuroku Rengōsekigun Asama-Sansō e no Dōtei) is a 2007 film written, directed and produced by Kōji Wakamatsu. It stars Akie Namiki as Hiroko Nagata and Go Jibiki as Tsuneo Mori, the leaders of Japan's leftist paramilitary group, the United Red Army. Akie Namiki was nominated for Best Performance by an Actress at the 2008 Asia Pacific Screen Awards.

== Story ==
The film is told in three acts, beginning with a historical background of Japan's student movement of the 1960s and early 1970s, mostly using archive footage and a narrator. The second act follows the formation of the group to their mountain training camps in the southern Japanese Alps. It emphasizes the dogmatic (and eventually hypocritical) bullying of the group by Mori and Nagata, with 12 members being killed. The third act shows the splitting up of the group after two members run off. It follows one group of five members to Karuizawa and a hostage-taking and police standoff known as the Asama-Sansō incident.

== Production ==
In order to make the film Wakamatsu mortgaged his home (which he destroyed in the movie) and distributed it himself. The actors were not allowed to wear make-up, had to arrive on set already in costume, and had their agents and managers banned during filming. The musical score is by the American composer and musician Jim O'Rourke.

== Reception ==
United Red Army has a 100% approval rating on Rotten Tomatoes, based on 15 critics. The film holds a 67/100 average on Metacritic. It was Jordan Hoffman's choice in IndieWire's 2018 list of the best Japanese films of the 21st century.
