= Éric Baudelaire =

Franco-American artist and filmmaker

- Born: 1973 (age 52–53); Salt Lake City, Utah, US
- Occupations: Artist, Filmmaker

Éric Baudelaire (born in 1973) is a Franco-American artist and filmmaker.

== Early life and education ==
Éric Baudelaire was born in Salt Lake City, Utah. He grew up in France, returned to the United States in 1991, to attend Brown University and graduated with a degree in political science.

== Work ==
Éric Baudelaire worked at the Harvard Kennedy School conducting research for Philip Zelikow's book The Kennedy Tapes, Inside The White House During The Cuban Missile Crisis. In 2000, a research trip to three unrecognized states in the Caucasus with Dr. Dov Lynch of King's College London marked Baudelaire's shift from social science to the visual arts field. In the course of further journeys to Abkhazia, a de facto state that seceded from Georgia after the breakup of the Soviet Union, Baudelaire developed a practice as a photographer, and published the book États Imaginés (Imagined States) in 2005.

While in residency at the French Villa Kujoyama in Kyoto in 2008, Baudelaire made two short films, [sic] and The Makes that were both selected to the International Rotterdam Film Festival. In Japan, he also began to work on his first feature film, The Anabasis of May and Fusako Shigenobu, Masao Adachi and 27 Years without Images, in which the story of the Japanese Red Army is recounted as an Anabasis, an uncertain wandering into the unknown that eventually becomes a journey home. The story is told through the voice of May Shigenobu, daughter of the founder of the Japanese Red Army, who lived a clandestine life in Lebanon until the age of 27, and Masao Adachi, a Japanese experimental film director who joined the Japanese Red Army in Beirut. The film puts into practice the "landscape theory" (fûkeiron in Japanese) developed by Masao Adachi, which proposes to turn the camera not towards the subject of the film but towards the landscapes in which the subject has lived. The film premiered at FID Marseille film festival.

The collaboration between Baudelaire and Masao Adachi gave way to a second film, The Ugly One, in 2013, based on a screenplay Baudelaire commissioned from Adachi. Adachi, who is forbidden from leaving Japan, sent a few pages of the script to Baudelaire, in Beirut, each morning of the film shoot. The film premiered in competition at the Locarno Film Festival and was shown as an installation at the 2014 Yokohama Triennial.

Baudelaire returned to Abkhazia in 2014, for his third feature, Letters to Max. The film is based on a correspondence with former Abkhaz Foreign Minister Maxim Gvinjia, to whom Baudelaire sent a series of letters from Paris to test whether the French postal system would deliver mail to a state it doesn't recognize. Gvinjia received many of the letters, and responded with voice recordings that became the voiceover for the film.

In 2015, Baudelaire organised the exhibition The Secession Sessions, which included Letters to Max, as well as a performance with Maxim Gvinjia titled The Abkhaz Anembassy, and a series of talks, lectures and workshops about the concepts of stateless statehood, nationalism and secessionism. The exhibition began at Bétonsalon, Paris, and travelled to Bergen Kunsthall, Norway, Berkeley Art Museum / Kadist San Francisco and Sharjah Biennial 12 where it won the prize.

Baudelaire's fourth feature film, Also Known As Jihadi, 2017, retraces the itinerary of a young Frenchman who flew to Egypt in 2012, and eventually joined the ranks of the Al Nusra Front in Syria. The film is a loose remake of Masao Adachi's 1969 A.K.A. Serial Killer. Baudelaire departs from Adachi's original film, which was composed entirely of landscapes, by adding a narrative made up of legal documents from the investigation into the young man's activities (wiretap transcripts, police interrogation reports), displayed on-screen between the landscape shots. The film became the centrepiece of an exhibition at the Centre Pompidou, in Paris, titled APRÈS (After), in reference to the November 2015 Paris attacks. The film was installed among a broad selection of works chosen in the Pompidou Museum's collection, along with a program of daily screenings and public discussions.

In 2019, Éric Baudelaire presents Tu peux prendre ton temps [You can take your time] at the Centre Pompidou, as part of the exhibition of artists nominated for the Marcel Duchamp Prize. At the heart of the show, a 114-minute film, Un film dramatique, made over four years with a group of students from the Dora Maar secondary school (Saint-Denis), is surrounded by a Prelude and an installation visible from one of the museum's terraces: Beau comme un Buren mais plus loin [As beautiful as Buren but further]. This is a flag made by one of the students who co-authored the film, displayed at the top of the Pleyel Tower, a geographical landmark that appears repeatedly in the film.

Tu peux prendre ton temps was exhibited at the Sao Paulo Biennial in 2021.

Similarly, Death Passed My Way and Stuck His Flower in My Mouth, an exhibition held at the Kunst Halle in Sankt Gallen in 2021, unfolds a series of installations around a film installation, taking up the motifs and themes addressed in the film.

== Filmography ==
- 2026: For the Moon
- 2022: When There Is No More Music To Write, and other Roman Stories (59 min)
- 2021: A Flower in the Mouth (67 min)
- 2019: Un film dramatique (114 min)
- 2018: Walked the Way Home (26 min)
- 2017: Also Known As Jihadi (99 min)
- 2014: Letters to Max (103 min)
- 2013: The Ugly One (101 min)
- 2011: The Anabasis of May and Fusako Shigenobu, Masao Adachi & 27 Years without Images (66 min)
- 2009: The Makes (26 min)
- 2008: [sic] (15 min)
- 2007: Sugar Water (72 min)
