= Moriaki Wakabayashi =

Japanese rock musician and hijacker

- 若林 盛亮
- Born: February 26, 1947; Kusatsu, Shiga, Japan
- Spouse: Sakiko Wakabayashi (m. 1976)
- Children: 2
- Musical career
- Genres: Psychedelic rock; noise rock
- Instrument: Bass guitar
- Years active: 1967–1970
- Formerly of: Les Rallizes Dénudés

Moriaki Wakabayashi (若林 盛亮, Wakabayashi Moriaki; born February 26, 1947) is a Japanese former rock musician and airline hijacker currently residing in self-imposed exile in North Korea. In the late 1960s, Wakabayashi was a founding member of the Japanese avant-garde rock band Les Rallizes Dénudés, serving as the band's bassist. Wakabayashi was a member of the "Yodogō Group" of the radical New Left Japan Communist League's "Red Army Faction" that carried out the hijacking of Japan Air Lines Flight 351 in 1970, ultimately forcing the plane to fly to North Korea. Wakabayashi currently resides in North Korea, along with other hijackers of the aircraft.

== Early life and education ==
Wakabayashi was born in Kusatsu City, Shiga Prefecture, Japan, on February 26, 1947. After graduating from Shiga Prefectural Zeze High School, he enrolled in the Faculty of Economics at Dōshisha University in Kyoto, but participated in the hijacking and went into exile before graduating.

== Music career ==
In 1967, Wakabayashi became a founding member of the pioneering Japanese noise rock band Les Rallizes Dénudés with classmates at Dōshisha, serving as the band's first bassist. Takashi Mizutani, the leader of the band, was reportedly also offered a role in the hijacking, but turned it down. Participation in the hijacking marked Wakabayashi's departure from the band.

== Hijacking ==
On March 31, 1970, Wakabayashi was one of nine hijackers who stormed the cockpit of Japan Airlines Flight 351, brandishing samurai swords and pipe bombs. At first they demanded to be flown to Cuba, where they expected to receive training as communist guerrilla soldiers. When the hijackers were informed that the Boeing 727 domestic flight did not have the range to fly to Cuba, they instead demanded to be flown to Pyongyang, North Korea. After stopping for refuelling in the aircraft's original destination of Fukuoka, where 23 hostages were freed, the pilots then flew the plane to Seoul, South Korea, where the airport had been rigged to look like North Korea. However, the hijackers realized they were tricked after hearing American jazz music playing and finding no welcoming committee awaiting them, whereupon they finally secured passage to North Korea in exchange for releasing the remaining hostages. In North Korea, they were granted political asylum.

== Later life ==
External videos
- Interview with Wakabayashi in 2017 on YouTube

In 1976, while living in North Korea, Wakabayashi married fellow radical activist and political exile Sakiko Wakabayashi, with whom he had two children. In a March 2010 interview with Kyodo News, Wakabayashi stated that the hijacking was a "selfish and conceited" act. Wakabayashi added that he wished to return to Japan and was willing to face arrest and trial for his role in the hijacking. In April 2014 he was still alive, and residing in North Korea together with other members of his group.
