= Mei Shigenobu =

Japanese journalist

- 重信メイ
- Born: March 1, 1973 (age 53); Beirut, Lebanon
- Other name: May Shigenobu
- Citizenship: Japanese
- Education: Lebanese University; American University of Beirut; Doshisha University
- Occupation: Journalist
- Employer(s): Asahi Newstar; Middle East Broadcasting Center
- Mother: Fusako Shigenobu

Mei Shigenobu (Japanese: 重信 メイ, romanized: Shigenobu Mei; IPA: [ɕiɡe̞no̞bɯ̟ me̞ː]; born March 1, 1973) is a Japanese journalist. She is the daughter of Japanese Red Army leader Fusako Shigenobu and of an unknown Palestinian who was reportedly a member of the Popular Front for the Liberation of Palestine. Some news agencies have given her name as May Shigenobu.

== Early life ==
Mei Shigenobu was born in Beirut, the capital of Lebanon in 1973. Her father was a Popular Front for the Liberation of Palestine guerrilla leader (not named by Mei due to security reasons) and her mother was the Japanese Red Army leader Fusako Shigenobu.

After three Japanese volunteers for the Popular Front for the Liberation of Palestine PFLP External Operations executed an attack on Israel's Lod Airport (see Lod Airport massacre) on May 30, 1972, PFLP leaders and other Japanese volunteers became targets for Israel's assassinations. In retaliation for the attack, PFLP's spokesman Ghassan Kanafani was killed on July 8, 1972, by the Israeli Intelligence Agency Mossad in a car bomb. Mei's mother became wanted by the INTERPOL in 1974 after the French embassy hostage-taking in The Hague in which she was thought to be involved, so Mei had to move frequently and used aliases to evade reprisals by her mother's enemies.

Mei Shigenobu lived in Lebanon and was raised during lengthy periods when her mother was absent by Arab friends and supporters. Her birth father was killed sometime during her childhood.

She attended different schools in Lebanon and other countries she refuses to name. She studied journalism at the Lebanese University. She was also a student at the American University of Beirut where she continued her graduate studies in International Relations. She was fluent in Arabic and English, but hid her knowledge of Japanese, fearing that it might lead to the capture of her mother.

She was not a citizen of any country until March 2001, when she received Japanese citizenship.

== Return to Japan ==
Mei came out of hiding after her mother was captured in Osaka, and visited Japan for the first time in April 2001, making her the first child of a Red Army member to return to Japan in five years. She was the subject of some controversy in December 2001 when she gave a talk at a public school in Kanagawa Prefecture about Arab culture and food at the invitation of a teacher there; the Israeli embassy in Tokyo sent a complaint to the school, describing her discussion as conveying "blatant, biased political" anti-Israeli sentiments. Japanese lawyers, scholars, journalists, writers and activists responded by signing a protest petition against the Israeli embassy and government saying that Mei was now a Japanese citizen and had the right to freedom of speech in Japan.

She then began working as an English teacher in a cram school in Tokyo. Mei later became an anchor on Japanese cable television channel Asahi Newstar's (TV Asahi's news channel) one-hour live political programme News no Shinsō. She is currently MBC's (Middle East Broadcasting Center, the United Arab Emirates' Arabic satellite channel) Tokyo correspondent, reporting in Arabic about Japan.

She earned her PhD degree in Media Studies from Doshisha University in 2011, doing research on the development of Arabic media, and the effect of satellite channels (a case study of Al Jazeera) on Arab societies.

Mei Shigenobu is a supporter of Palestinian statehood and a critic of Israel. In contrast to Bettina Röhl's (Ulrike Meinhof's daughter) disavowal, shown in Children of the Revolution, she views her mother's actions with pride, to the point of stating that she considers her a role model, merely repeating, as her mother, that those were different times, as she mentioned to the Standard, "there were no means of gaining media attention", and with today's media and communication, other venues prove far more effective. Also arguing that her mother's activities should not be viewed through 'contemporary eyes,' saying that it was in an era people were fighting against oppression around the world, and that "We forget all that background and we just pick up a person from there and choose to sentence her using today's sensibility, today's values and today's way of thinking.".

== In popular culture ==
Mei appeared in Nobuyuki Oura's November 2006 movie 9/11-8/15 Japan Pack Suicide (『9.11-8.15-日本心中-』). Mei also appears in Documentary on Zunou Keisatsu (ドキュメンタリー頭脳警察; 2009), a documentary featuring the life of rock band "Zunou Keisatu" (頭脳警察; 'Brain Police') and its lead singer PANTA.

In 2010, Mei costarred in the fictional Japanese movie on figure skating Coach as a sports journalist. In 2010, Mei Shigenobu and her mother Fusako Shigenobu were featured in Shane O'Sullivan's documentary film Children of the Revolution, which premiered at the International Documentary Festival Amsterdam. In 2011, Mei Shigenobu was featured in Eric Baudelaire's experimental movie The Anabasis of May and Fusako Shigenobu, Masao Adachi, and 27 years without Images along with filmmaker and Japanese Red Army member Masao Adachi, which was entered at the 22nd Marseilles International Film Festival.

== Publications ==
- Shigenobu, Mei (May 2002), 秘密―パレスチナから桜の国へ 母と私の28年 [Secrets - from Palestine to the country of cherry trees, 28 years with my mother], Kōdansha, ISBN 4-06-210859-3
- Shigenobu, Mei (February 2003), 中東のゲットーから [From the ghettos of the Middle East], Weitsu, ISBN 4-901391-31-3
- Shigenobu, Mei (October 2012), 「アラブの春」の正体 欧米とメディアに踊らされた民主化革命 [The "Arab Spring"; How it was Played out by the West and the Media], Kadokawa Publishers
