= Japan Air Lines Flight 404 =

1973 aircraft hijacking

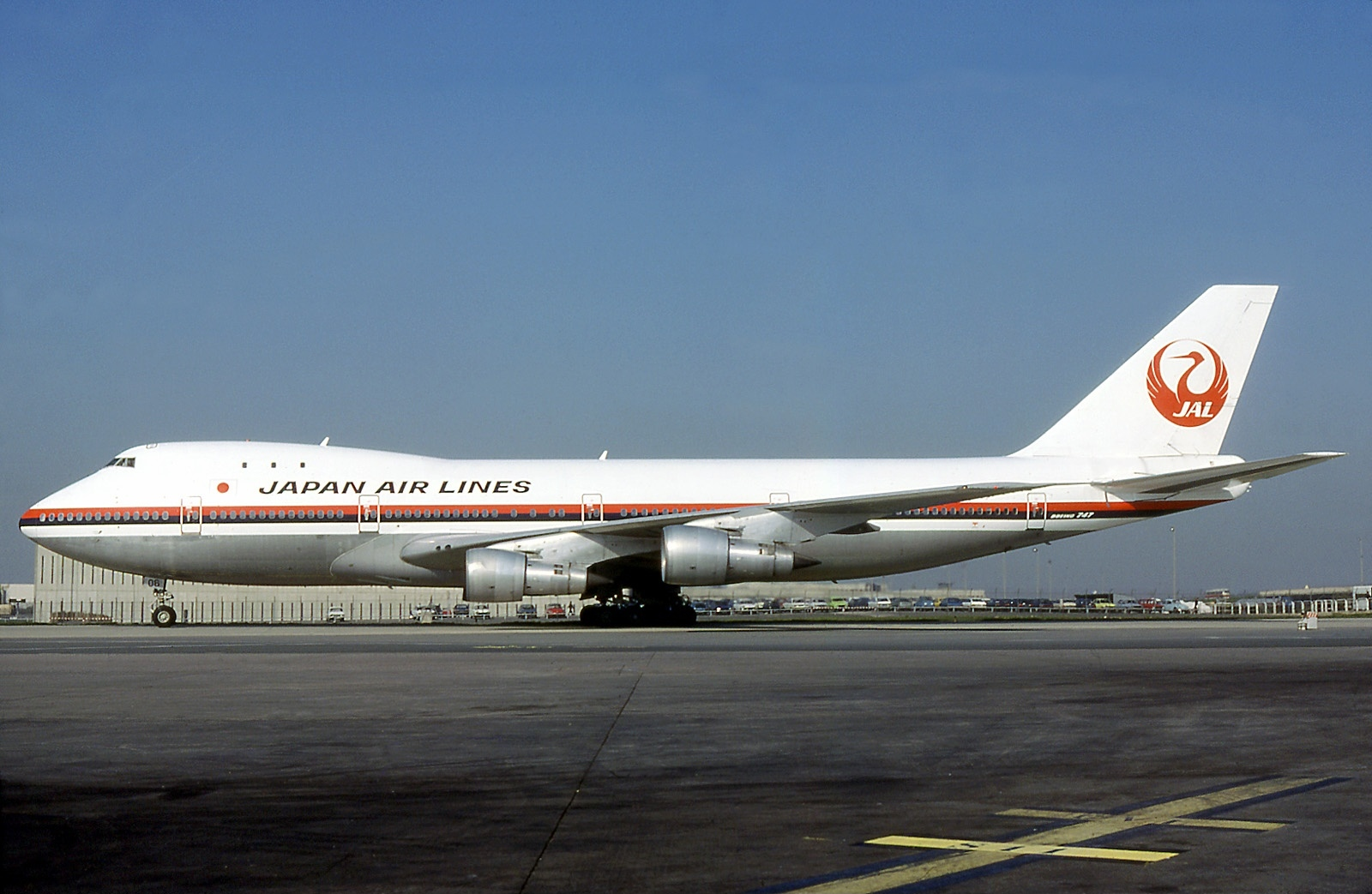
- JAL Boeing 747-200 similar to aircraft involved

Hijacking
- Date: 20 July 1973
- Summary: Hijacking
- Site: Dubai International Airport, Dubai, United Arab Emirates

Aircraft
- Aircraft type: Boeing 747-246B
- Operator: Japan Air Lines
- Registration: JA8109
- Flight origin: Schiphol International Airport, Amsterdam, Netherlands
- 1st stopover: Orly International Airport, Paris, France
- 2nd stopover: Ted Stevens Anchorage International Airport, Anchorage, Alaska, United States
- Destination: Tokyo International Airport, Tokyo, Japan
- Occupants: 145
- Passengers: 123 (including 5 hijackers)
- Crew: 22
- Fatalities: 1 (hijacker)
- Injuries: unknown
- Survivors: 144 (all passengers and crew, including 4 of 5 hijackers)

Japan Air Lines Flight 404 was a passenger flight which was hijacked by Palestinian militants and a member of the Japanese Red Army on 20 July 1973.

The flight departed Amsterdam-Schiphol International Airport, Netherlands, on 20 July 1973, en route to Tokyo International Airport (Haneda), Japan, via Anchorage International Airport, Alaska, US. The aircraft was a Boeing 747-246B, with 123 passengers and 22 crew members on board.

Among the passengers were five hijackers, led by Osamu Maruoka, a member of the Japanese Red Army (JRA), with the remainder being Palestinians. The Palestinians are sometimes reported to have been members of the Popular Front for the Liberation of Palestine (PFLP). However, according to Yezid Sayigh, the attack was organised by Wadie Haddad, who had been expelled from the PFLP in March 1972 following a prior hijack. Haddad had gone on to found a separate organisation, the Popular Front for the Liberation of Palestine - External Operations (PFLP-EO). The PFLP rapidly denied responsibility.

Just after takeoff from Schiphol Airport, the flight was hijacked. One of the hijackers accidentally detonated a grenade she was carrying, killing herself and severely injuring the chief purser. Maruoka almost immediately announced himself to air traffic control as El Kassar, and claimed the hijack for the Palestinian Liberation Movement, an organisation with no prior or subsequent existence. After several Middle Eastern governments refused to permit Flight 404 to land, the plane eventually touched down in Dubai, in the United Arab Emirates. After several days on the ground, the terrorists demanded the release of Kozo Okamoto, survivor of the JRA's attack on Tel Aviv's Lod Airport.

After the Israeli government refused to release Okamoto, the hijackers flew the aircraft first to Damascus, Syria, and then to Benghazi, in Libya. On 23 July, 89 hours after the hijacking began, the passengers and crew were released; the hijackers then blew up the aircraft, making the incident the second hull loss of a Boeing 747, and the first hull loss of a 747-200. The first hull-loss was also the result of hijackers.

Maruoka escaped, and in 1977, led the hijacking of Japan Air Lines Flight 472. He remained a fugitive until 1987 when he was arrested in Tokyo after entering Japan on a forged passport. Given a life sentence, he died in prison on 29 May 2011.
