= Tsuyoshi Okudaira =

Japanese communist activist

- 奥平 剛士
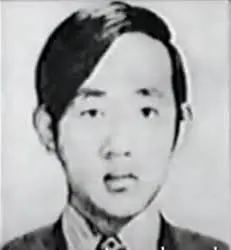
- Born: July 21, 1945; Shimonoseki, Yamaguchi, Japan
- Died: May 30, 1972 (aged 26); Lod Airport, Central District, Israel
- Cause of death: hand grenade explosion
- Education: Kyoto University
- Years active: 1964–1972
- Organization: Japanese Red Army
- Movement: Communism, PFLP
- Spouse: Fusako Shigenobu

Tsuyoshi Okudaira (Japanese: 奥平 剛士, romanized: Okudaira Tsuyoshi; IPA: [o̞kɯ̟da̠iɾa̠ t͡sɨjo̞ɕi]; July 21, 1945 – May 30, 1972) was a Japanese communist activist and one of the leaders of the militant group Japanese Red Army (JRA). He was killed carrying out the Lod Airport Massacre near Lod, Israel on May 30, 1972. At the time of his death, he was married to JRA leader Fusako Shigenobu. He was the older brother of fellow JRA activist Junzō Okudaira.

== Early life ==
Okudaira was born on July 21, 1945, in Shimonoseki, Yamaguchi prefecture. In 1964, he enrolled in the Faculty of Engineering at Kyoto University. He soon became involved in communist activism, joining the Democratic Youth League of Japan (Minsei), the youth wing of the Japan Communist Party. However, finding Minsei too hierarchical and not radical enough, he quit after about six months, and joined the Zenkyōtō movement of "all-campus joint struggles."

Around this time, Okudaira fell under the sway of Nobuhiro Takemoto, a radical activist who was working as a teaching assistant at Kyoto University, and joined the "Kyoto Partisans," a loose collective of underground militant cells that had ties to the equally radical Red Army Faction (RAF) of the Japan Communist League. Through this connection, Okudaira met Fusako Shigenobu, who was the only woman on the Central Committee of the RAF. Shigenobu and Okudaira became enamored of relocating to the Middle East to make common cause with the Palestinian liberation movement. To this end, Okudaira joined the RAF to make their move an official RAF mission of establishing an overseas foreign base, and the pair entered into a sham marriage because while Shigenobu was well known to Japanese police and might have difficulty traveling, Okudaira was not, and by getting married she could travel as "Mrs. Okudaira." Arriving in Beirut in March 1971, the two activists did not act as a couple and lived in separate apartments.

== Lod Airport Massacre and death ==
Linking up with Wadie Haddad's "Popular Front for the Liberation of Palestine – External Operations" group, Okudaira received funds, supplies, and training from Haddad, and began working with Haddad to plan what would become the Lod Airport Massacre of 1972. The idea was that since Israeli airport security was focused on stopping Palestinian attackers, they would not suspect ethnically Japanese attackers. Meanwhile, a schism occurred between the Red Army Faction back in Japan and the group of Japanese activists in Beirut, with Shigenobu declaring a new, separate group, the Japanese Red Army.

At 10 p.m. on May 30, 1972, three JRA members – Okudaira, Kōzō Okamoto, and Yasuyuki Yasuda – arrived at Lod Airport in Israel aboard an Air France flight from Rome. Dressed conservatively and carrying slim violin cases, they attracted little attention. As they entered the waiting area, they opened up their violin cases and extracted Czech vz. 58 assault rifles with the butt stocks removed. They began to fire indiscriminately at airport staff and visitors, which included a group of pilgrims from Puerto Rico, and tossed grenades as they changed magazines. Yasuda was accidentally shot dead by one of the other attackers, and Okudaira moved from the airport building into the landing area, firing at passengers disembarking from an El Al aircraft before being killed by one of his own grenades, either due to accidental premature explosion or as a suicide. Okamoto was shot by security, brought to the ground by an El Al employee, and arrested as he attempted to leave the terminal. Excluding the attackers themselves, a total of 26 people were killed in the attack, with 79 others injured.

Okudaira had written a letter to his parents from Rome, knowing that it would not reach them until after the attack had already occurred. He wrote:

For us soldiers, death is an utterly everyday affair – yet it saddens my heart now to think how you two will grieve for me. Today in Vietnam many thousands of young soldiers are dying....We are just some soldiers attempting to die for the revolution; you are just one of the thousands and thousands of fathers and mothers crying for them. Please always remember how our blood and tears are making something of value.
