= Japan Air Lines Flight 351 =

1970 aircraft hijacking

Coordinates: 35.540°N 139.804°E

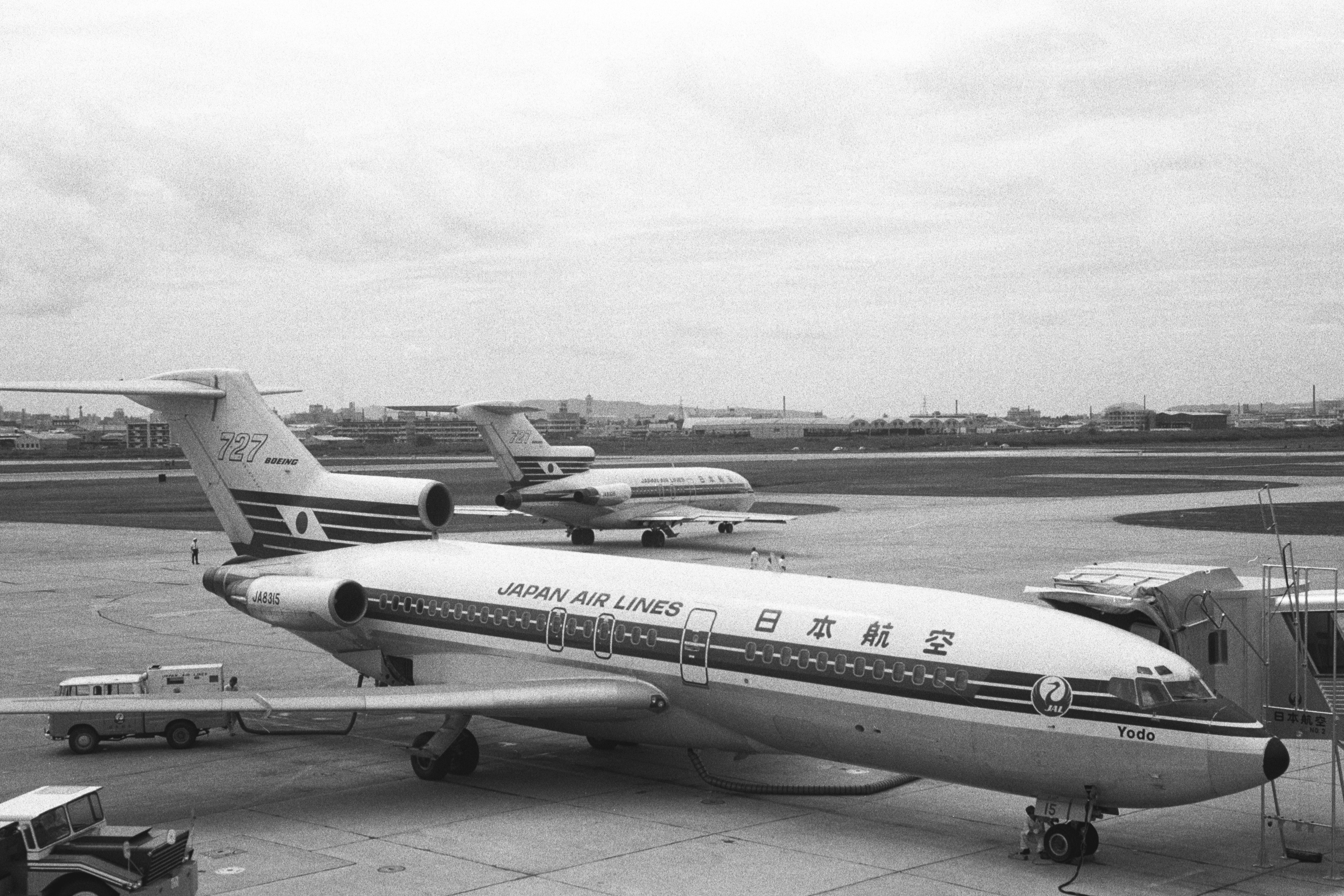
- JA8315, the aircraft involved in the hijacking, pictured in 1969

Hijacking
- Date: March 31, 1970
- Summary: Hijacking, subsequent emergency landing
- Site: Japan

Aircraft
- Aircraft type: Boeing 727-89
- Aircraft name: Yodo
- Operator: Japan Air Lines
- Call sign: JAPAN AIR 351
- Registration: JA8315
- Flight origin: Tokyo International Airport
- Destination: Fukuoka Airport
- Occupants: 138 (including 9 hijackers)
- Passengers: 131 (including 9 hijackers)
- Crew: 7
- Fatalities: 0
- Injuries: 0
- Survivors: 138 (including 9 hijackers)

Japan Air Lines Flight 351 was a scheduled passenger flight from Tokyo Haneda Airport to Fukuoka that was hijacked by members of the Red Army Faction of the Japan Communist League on March 31, 1970, in an incident usually referred to in Japanese as the Yodo Hijacking Incident (よど号ハイジャック事件, Yodo-gō Haijakku Jiken), after the aircraft's name Yodo (meaning "still water").

== Background ==
In 1966, the New Left student organization known as the Communist League, defunct since 1960, reformed, becoming known as the "Second Bund" (第二次ブント, Dainiji Bunto). At this time, the "Kansai faction" of the Second Bund, based at Doshisha University in Kyoto and led by Kyoto University philosophy major dropout Takaya Shiomi (塩見孝也, Shiomi Takaya), comprised the far left wing of the already far-left Second Bund. Around June 1968, the Kansai faction began calling itself the "Red Army Faction," and began making plans for a violent uprising in Japan, originally intended to coincide with the 1970 Anpo protests.

The main theory of the Red Army Faction was that by first carrying out a successful armed proletarian revolution in Japan, Japan would become the headquarters of a worldwide revolution against the United States of America and its allies, and the Red Army Faction would become the leaders of that revolution.

Finding the rest of the Second Bund unamenable to the cause of immediate armed revolution, the Red Army Faction signaled its open split from its parent organization in 1969. On September 5, Takaya and other Red Army Faction members publicly appeared at Hibiya Public Hall in Tokyo to declare the independence of the Red Army Faction from the Communist League and announce the start of an immediate armed revolution.

In early 1970, Shiomi began making plans to hijack a Japanese airliner, codenamed "Operation Phoenix," that would allow group members to fly to Cuba and continue their training. However, just before the hijacking could take place, Shiomi was arrested by chance on the street in Komagome, Tokyo on March 15, 1970, having been mistaken for a common thief. Nevertheless, the remaining hijackers pressed on with their plans; on March 31, 1970, nine members of the Red Army Faction, armed with katana swords and a homemade bomb, hijacked Japan Airlines Flight 351, a domestic Japan Airlines Boeing 727 out of Tokyo International Airport carrying 129 other people aboard.

== Hijacking ==
Approximately 20 minutes after takeoff, a young man named Takamaro Tamiya got up from his seat, drew a katana and shouted, "We are Ashita no Joe!" He stated his intent to hijack the plane and instructed the other hijackers to draw their weapons. The hijackers then took 129 people (122 passengers and seven crew members) hostage and commanded the pilots to fly the plane to Havana, Cuba, where they intended to receive training by communist military groups. The hijackers were then informed that the aircraft, a Boeing 727, was not capable of making such a journey, due to the plane's inability to hold the necessary amount of fuel. Upon learning of this, the hijackers insisted that the plane be diverted to Pyongyang, North Korea, after stopping to refuel in Fukuoka. Upon arrival at Fukuoka, the police convinced the hijackers to release 23 of their hostages, and the pilots were given a map of the Korean Peninsula. Attached to the map was a note which instructed the pilots to tune their radios to a specific frequency. The air traffic controllers, who were aware of the situation, intentionally gave the pilots incorrect directions in an effort to have them land at Gimpo Airport in Seoul, South Korea, where they had disguised the airport as being North Korean. Despite this, the hijackers quickly realised that they had been tricked, and Japan's Vice Minister for Transport, Shinjiro Yamamura, volunteered to take the place of the remaining hostages, and the hijackers accepted his offer. They then proceeded to Pyongyang's Mirim Airport, with Yamamura now as hostage, where they surrendered to North Korean authorities, who offered the whole group asylum.

Using North Korea as a base, they sought to incite rebellion in South Korea and elsewhere across East Asia. The plane carrying Vice Minister Yamamura and the remainder of the crew was released two days later and returned to its gate at Haneda Airport at 9:39 am on April 5.

== Later events ==
=== Hijackers ===
The alleged mastermind of the hijacking, Takaya Shiomi, was tried, convicted, and served almost 20 years in prison in Japan. After his release in 1989, suffering from poor health, Shiomi obtained a low-paid job as an attendant at a multi-level parking facility in Kiyose, Tokyo, where he was working as late as 2008. He said that they had intended to go to Cuba via North Korea. He joined an antibase movement in Okinawa and an antinuclear campaign, and wrote several books related to the Red Army Faction. In April 2015, he ran in the city assembly elections in Kiyose, campaigning on an anti-Abe platform and against the city's policies which he said were "bullying" the elderly. He died on November 14, 2017, of heart failure at a Tokyo hospital.

Moriaki Wakabayashi was an early member (bass player) in the long-running avant-garde rock band Les Rallizes Dénudés. In a March 2010 interview with Kyodo News, Wakabayashi called the hijacking a "selfish and conceited" act. He added that he wished to return to Japan and was willing to face arrest and trial for his role in the hijacking. In April 2014 he was still alive, and residing in North Korea together with other members of his group.

In 1985, Yasuhiro Shibata returned to Japan in secret to raise money for the group, was arrested, and was sentenced to five years in prison. Yoshimi Tanaka was arrested in Thailand with a large amount of counterfeit money and repatriated to Japan in March 2000, where he was sentenced; he died before its completion. However, the other hijackers remain at large, according to Japan's National Police Agency.

The leader of the group, Takamaro Tamiya, died in 1995 and Kintaro Yoshida sometime before 1985. Takeshi Okamoto and his wife Kimiko Fukudome were probably killed trying to flee North Korea. Takahiro Konishi, Shiro Akagi, Kimihuro Uomoto and Moriaki Wakabayashi still reside in North Korea; all except Takeshi Okamoto were confirmed to have been alive as of 2004 when they were interviewed by Kyodo News. In June 2004, the remaining hijackers made a request to North Korean authorities that they be allowed to return to Japan, even if they are to be punished for the hijacking.

On November 29, 2024, the remaining hijackers sent an email to a support group in Japan stating that "Due to the circumstances of Korea, communication with Japan will be cut off from December 1. We will not be able to communicate or exchange as we have done in the past. We do not know when communications will be able to resume." The posting of notes by remaining hijackers on a website in Japan also ceased as of November 2024. The cessation of communication was believed to be a measure taken by North Korean authorities, but the reasons for this were unclear.

=== Aircraft ===
After the incident, the practice of giving nicknames such as "Yodo" to Japan Airlines aircraft was abolished, and the aircraft was repainted with the new "crane livery" that Japan Airlines adopted with the introduction of the Boeing 747 in 1970. After the merger of Japan Domestic Airlines and Toa Airways in 1971, the aircraft was transferred to the newly formed Toa Domestic Airlines, and was operated under the nickname "Honoko" until 1975.

In 1976, the aircraft was sold to Hapag-Lloyd Flug, and from the 1990s, it was repeatedly resold to the United States, Europe, and other countries around the world, often used as a private charter plane (aircraft code N511DB). In 1997, the aircraft was used by Irish rock band U2 for their PopMart world tour, and in 1999, it was used as the team airplane of the fictional American football team "Miami Sharks" in the Oliver Stone-directed film Any Given Sunday.

Later on, it was stored on a tarmac called the "graveyard of airplanes" in the United States. During that period, the NTV television show "Where Are They Now?" aired an episode titled, "Shinji Ishida, the captain at the time of the hijacking of a Japanese airliner, reunites with the Yodo," featuring former pilot Ishida visiting the aircraft on the tarmac.

In August 2004, the aircraft was acquired by CO-ZA Airways in the Democratic Republic of the Congo and was used as a VIP flight aircraft based at N'djili Airport in Kinshasa (aircraft code 9Q-CBF 9Q-CBF. However, after the bankruptcy of Xhosa Airlines around 2006, it was abandoned at an airport in the DRC, and then dismantled locally in 2012.

== Notable passengers ==
The future archbishop and cardinal Stephen Fumio Hamao was one of the passengers on the flight. Another passenger was Shigeaki Hinohara, who was one of the world's longest-serving physicians and educators. One of the two American passengers was a regional director for Pepsi.

== Depictions ==
The 2025 South Korean black comedy Good News is loosely inspired by the hijacking. The pilot episode of the TV-series Made in Korea features a dramatization of the event.

== See also ==
- Red Army Faction (Japan)
- Anpo protests
- New Left in Japan
- Japanese people in North Korea
- Japan–North Korea relations
- 1973 Royal Nepal Airlines DHC-6 hijacking
- List of aircraft hijackings
