= Gan Tanigawa =

Gan Tanigawa (谷川 雁; December 25, 1923 – February 2, 1995) was a Japanese poet, critic, and social activist. He is best known for his work with the Sakuru Mura (サークル村) poetry group.

== Early life and education ==
Tanigawa was born Iwao Tanigawa (谷川 巌) on December 25, 1923 in Minamata, Kumamoto. He was born the second of six children. His siblings include Kenichi Tanigawa and Michio Tanigawa. He entered Tokyo Imperial University in 1942. He was a student conscript in the military during World War II, but returned to the university and finished his degree in 1945.

== Career ==
After graduation Tanigawa worked as a journalist. While working he joined a poetry group which published a journal called Boin (母音). In 1947 Tanigawa joined the Japanese Communist Party. He published his first volume of poetry in 1954, then another in 1956 and 1960. In 1958 he moved to the Chikuhō region with Kazue Morisaki and Eishin Ueno and founded a poetry group and journal called Sakuru Mura (サークル村).

Tanigawa left the Communist Party during the Anpo protests. Instead he became involved in the Miike coal mine strike that was happening at that time. When that failed, he tried to organize at a smaller mine. Often his work focused on the local level, with hopes of that change then making an impact on a larger scale. In 1962 he tried to start a school with Masao Matsuda, Hiroshi Kawani, and Kenji Yamaguchi, but it failed. In 1966 he paused his writing and returned to Tokyo, where he founded a company. He moved to Nagano prefecture in 1978, then left his company in 1980.

Though he did not write for the New Left, Gan is credited as a predecessor to the movement. His writing style has been called "magical, but highly conceptual".

Tanigawa died of lung cancer on February 2, 1995 in Kawasaki.
