= Kazue Morisaki =

Japanese poet and writer (1927–2022)

Kazue Morisaki (森崎和江, Morisaki Kazue; April 20, 1927 – June 15, 2022) was a Japanese poet and nonfiction writer. She is best known for her 1976 book Karayuki-san (からゆきさん).

== Early life and education ==
Morisaki was born in what is now Daegu, Korea on April 20, 1927. Her father was a teacher. The family also had a Korean nanny for their three children, of which Morisaki was the oldest. Morisaki's mother died of cancer when she was in high school. Her family moved back to Fukuoka, Japan when World War II broke out. She graduated from what is now Fukuoka Women's University in 1947. Her essay "Two Languages, Two Souls" is about her complex emotions regarding leaving Korea, including her attempts to erase her Korean past and her acknowledgement of her former position as a colonizer.

== Career ==
In 1950 she began writing for a poetry magazine headed by Yutaka Maruyama. She also started a family and had a daughter. In 1956 she began working at the Fukuoka NHK, where she wrote essays and scripts for radio dramas. In 1957 she moved to a mining town in Chikuhō with Gan Tanigawa and Eishin Ueno and founded a journal called Sakuru Mura (サークル村). She also published a journal for women called Mumei Tsushin (無名通信) from 1959 to 1960. Even after the mine closed and Tanigawa left for Tokyo, Morisaki continued writing.

Morisaki published one of her best-known works, Karayuki-san (からゆきさん), in 1976. It was about Japanese women who moved overseas to be sex workers.

Throughout her career she wrote more than fifty books and earned many awards, such as the Yutaka Maruyama Prize for poetry. Her works were typically about women, the working class, and their struggles. She was particularly interested in the "underground" culture of the miners and how it differed from "aboveground" Japanese culture.
