= Red Army Faction (Japan) =

Communist militant organization (1968-1971)

- 赤軍派
- Leader: Takaya Shiomi
- Dates active: 1968–1971
- Split from: Communist League
- Country: Japan
- Active regions: Japan, North Korea
- Ideology: Communism; Marxism–Leninism; Maoism
- Political position: Far-left
- Status: Defunct

The Red Army Faction (赤軍派, Sekigunha) was a militant communist organization active in Japan from 1968 to 1971, when it split to form two successor groups, the Japanese Red Army and the United Red Army. The Red Army Faction originated as a schismatic militant sub-faction of a larger New Left student organization called the Communist League (共産主義者同盟, Kyōsanshugisha Dōmei). Advocating immediate, armed uprising against the forces of Japanese monopoly capitalism in preparation for worldwide revolution, the Red Army Faction planned a variety of attacks on police and government officials, as well as criminal activities such as bank robberies to fund their planned communist revolution. Most notably on March 30, 1970, members of the group hijacked Japan Air Lines Flight 351, eventually flying the aircraft to North Korea where the hijackers were granted political asylum.

== History ==
=== Origins ===
In 1966, the New Left student organization the Communist League, defunct since 1960, reformed, becoming known as the "Second Bund" (第二次ブント, Dainiji Bunto). At this time, the "Kansai faction" of the Second Bund, based out of Doshisha University in Kyoto and led by Kyoto University philosophy major dropout Takaya Shiomi (塩見孝也, Shiomi Takaya), comprised the far left wing of the already far-left Second Bund. Around June 1968, the Kansai faction began calling itself the "Red Army Faction," and began making plans for a violent uprising in Japan, originally intended to coincide with the 1970 Anpo protests.

The main theory of the Red Army Faction was that by first carrying out a successful armed proletarian revolution in Japan, Japan would become the headquarters of a worldwide revolution against the United States of America and its allies, and the Red Army Faction would become the leaders of that revolution.

Finding the rest of the Second Bund unamenable to the cause of immediate, armed revolution, the Red Army Faction signaled its open split from its parent organization by launching an assault on the Bund's National Congress held at Meiji University in Tokyo on July 5, 1969, briefly seizing control of the venue. The next day, Bund students from Chuo University launched a counter-attack, kidnapping Red Army chairman Shiomi and others, and imprisoning them for three weeks in a stronghold on the Chuo University campus, where they were subjected to threats and torture. Although Shiomi and the others eventually managed escape by descending from a third floor window using a makeshift rope constructed from a curtain and a hose, during the escape Red Army Faction member Jо̄ji Mochizuki fell and hit his head and would die from his injuries several weeks later.

As a result of this incident, the Japan Communist Party expelled all known members of the Red Army Faction the following month. On September 5, 1969, Shiomi and other Faction members publicly appeared at Hibiya Public Hall in Tokyo to declare the independence of the Red Army Faction from the Communist League and announce the start of an immediate armed revolution. The Hall was surrounded by uniformed police, while plainclothes police officers photographed the 300 or so people present, many of whom wore ski masks to conceal their identities.

=== Launch of armed struggle ===
On September 21, 1969, members of the Red Army Faction threw molotov cocktails at three police boxes in Osaka, in an incident grandiosely recollected by Faction members as the "Osaka War." Similarly on September 30, Faction members threw molotov cocktails at the Motofuji police box in Tokyo, which they then declared to have been the "Tokyo War."

Meanwhile, the group planned more significant attacks against government agencies and the Prime Minister's official residence, for which they began "training" at the Daibosatsu mountain pass northwest of Tokyo. However, on November 5, 1969, having been tipped off by informants, police raided the inn where the student militants were sleeping, arresting 53 group members (including many key Red Army leaders) and capturing detailed plans for the intended attacks. Realizing that they could no longer operate openly in Japan, the group went underground, and began searching for a way to escape Japan and continue their guerrilla training overseas.

=== Airline hijacking ===
In early 1970, Shiomi began making plans to hijack a Japanese airliner, codenamed "Operation Phoenix," that would allow group members to fly to Cuba and continue their training. However, just before the hijacking could take place, Shiomi was arrested by chance on the street in Komagome, Tokyo on March 15, 1970, having been mistaken for a common thief. Nevertheless, the remaining hijackers pressed on with their plans, and on March 31, 1970, nine members the Red Army Faction, armed with katana swords and a homemade bomb, hijacked Japan Airlines Flight 351, a domestic Japan Airlines Boeing 727 out of Tokyo International Airport carrying 129 people aboard. After being informed that the airliner did not have enough fuel to fly all the way to Cuba, they forced the crew to fly the plane to Fukuoka and later Gimpo Airport in Seoul, where all the passengers were freed. The aircraft then flew to North Korea, where the hijackers abandoned it and the crewmembers were released. The hijackers were granted political asylum by the North Korean government of Kim Il Sung, and several of them still reside in North Korea.

=== Robberies and schism ===
Between February and July 1971, Red Army Faction members who remained in Japan, now under the leadership of Tsuneo Mori, carried out a series of relatively successful armed robberies of banks and post offices, in an effort to secure funds for their armed uprising. However, by this time the loss of Shiomi's ideological leadership, combined with relentless pursuit by police and continued arrests of key members, had taken a severe toll on the organization's cohesion. A schism arose between those remaining members who wished to carry out Shiomi's last command to relocate overseas, and those who wished to implement Shiomi's original vision of starting the worldwide revolution in Japan. Those that wanted to relocate overseas became the Japanese Red Army, led by Shigenobu Fusako and Tsuyoshi Okudaira, while those who wished to continue the revolution at home in Japan joined forces with the Kanagawa prefectural branch of the Revolutionary Left Faction to form the United Red Army, led by Tsuneo Mori and Hiroko Nagata.

== Notable members ==
- Tsuneo Mori
- Tsuyoshi Okudaira
- Fusako Shigenobu
- Takaya Shiomi
- Moriaki Wakabayashi

== See also ==
- Japan Air Lines Flight 351
- Japanese Red Army
- United Red Army
- Zengakuren
- New Left in Japan
- Communist League (Japan)
