= United Red Army =

Revolutionary group in Japan

United Red Army; 連合赤軍
- Leaders: Tsuneo Mori; Hiroko Nagata
- Active regions: Japan
- Ideology: Communism; Marxism–Leninism–Maoism; New Left
- Status: Dissolved

The United Red Army (連合赤軍, Rengō Sekigun) (URA) was a far-left militant organization that operated in Japan between July 1971 and March 1972. The URA was formed as the result of a merger that began on 13 July 1971 between two extremist groups, the Marxist–Leninist–Maoist Red Army Faction (赤軍派, Sekigunha), led in 1971 by Tsuneo Mori, and the Reformed Marxist Revolutionary Left Wing group, Japanese Communist Party Kanagawa Prefecture Committee, also known as the Keihin Anti-Security Treaty Joint Struggle Group (京浜安保共闘, Keihin Anpo Kyōtō), led by Hiroko Nagata.

The group intended to disrupt the Japanese political system to enable the emergence of communism.

The United Red Army's internal functioning was marked by violence: members who had defected from the group were murdered, while others were routinely beaten and humiliated to eliminate their "bourgeois" tendencies and ultimately killed. The group had 29 members and lost 14 due to internal killings in less than a year. The URA came to a sudden end with the Asama-Sanso incident, a nine-day siege and hostage situation at their mountain hideout in Nagano Prefecture in February 1972. This event was widely publicized, with viewers across Japan able to view the shoot-out between the radicals and riot police on TV.

Immediately after the URA's disbanding, public perception of the group was varied. Many were strongly opposed to the group and their tendency toward violence, whilst others initially sympathized with them and their desire to bring down the "police state". This perception changed after the group's internal functioning was revealed to the public.

== Formation ==
The Red Army Faction was an organization led by Japanese college students after having split from its parent group, Bund, otherwise known as the Communist League. This split came as a result of a tense disagreement regarding the militant policies the Red Army Faction had adopted. The group consisted mainly of students from regional Japan that attended elite universities with the intention to "do something bold and different that would move the process of revolution forward". These actions were targeted towards police, the group's ultimate enemies and motivation for attack. The Red Army Faction lost its numbers over time due to deaths resulting from violent missions and protests, as well as arrests. Despite this, the group was able to amass large amounts of money from their 'Operation M' which involved a series of robberies.

The Revolutionary Left group split off from the Japanese Communist Party after World War II. They reached the peak of their popularity in the 1960s where they garnered support from university and high school students for their controversial view that such higher education institutions were acting only to serve the state. Much like the Red Army, their protests grew more violent toward police. The group also instilled an element of performance, allowing themselves, in some instances, to be beaten violently to convey metaphorically that they were the victims. The Revolutionary Left escalated their violent approaches with the intentions of obtaining weaponry, such as with their gun shop robbery of 1971.

The alliance between the Revolutionary Left and Red Army Faction began as each had resources that the other desired. The Revolutionary Left were able to provide guns that the Red Army needed to support their 'armed conflict', for which they received much needed funds. This relationship developed with the groups co-operating with some of their rallies and demonstrations. This ultimately led to the groups forming an alliance. The formation of their United Red Army was publicly announced on 15 July 1971 in the magazine that the groups had created, entitled Jūka, meaning "Gunfire". This new group was led by Red Army Faction leader Tsuneo Mori, with his second in command being the female leader of the Revolutionary Left, Hiroko Nagata. The purpose of the group was initially outlined as to "carry out hit-and-run attacks" on the Japanese "imperialist bourgeoisie". However, after troubleshooting their conflicting underlying beliefs and purposes, a unified resolve "to fight a war of annihilation of guns, against the Japanese authorities" was decided to be the group's manifesto.

== Training and treatment of members ==
Soon after the United Red Army's formation, two members originally from the Revolutionary Left deserted the group. In order to make an example of the defectors, Nagata arranged their murders with the assistance of other URA members.

In December 1971, by the order of their leader Mori, the URA moved its headquarters to the training camps that the Red Army Faction had previously made use of. Aside from the preparation of their next movements and missions, the group underwent a process known as 'self-criticism', a ritual that had become normalized among Left groups in Japan at the time. The original intention of this practice was to allow members of the group to strengthen their alignment with the values and purpose of the cause.

However, Mori quickly introduced an element of violence to this process in keeping with the New Left's demand for individuals to demonstrate their commitment. The purpose of this violence against members was to test their devotion to the cause. Mori argued that beating members into unconsciousness would allow for them to be reborn with true "communistic subjectivity" when they were brought back to consciousness. Members of the URA expressed their concerns to Mori regarding this practice and the unpredictability as to the consequences of beatings, unsure of an exact way to achieve sending a member into unconsciousness. As such, it was through this process that several group members were killed.

Two members originally from the Revolutionary Left were the first victims of self-criticism. Kato Yoshitaka was selected for self-criticism as he had spoken to police during an earlier interrogation, and Kojima Kazuko for lacking the ability to fight her "bourgeois thinking". Initially the pair were refused food, and from 26–27 December Kato was tied up and beaten by group members. Kojima was also beaten by group members. As Kato had not lost consciousness during the beatings, Mori concluded that he had not achieved self-criticism and so he was tied to a post outside in the harsh mountain climate to suffer further beatings. Once the leaders Nagata and Mori were satisfied that Kato had achieved self-critique he was brought inside. However, he died from his injuries on 4 January 1972. This was not before another member, Ozaki Mitsuo, was killed in the self-critique process initiated against him on 28 December that resulted in his death two days later.

These violent beatings ultimately saw the death of 12 members of the URA who had been deemed not sufficiently revolutionary. Many of the twelve victims died tied to posts in the open, exposed to the elements, but others were beaten to death or slaughtered with knives. The last death occurred on 12 February. The bodies of the victims were buried in the woods nearby their mountain camp.

== Downfall ==
The police were able to trace the URA to their mountain hideout. In the surrounding areas, they located the bodies of members that had fallen victim to the so-called self-criticism sessions.

In early February 1972, Mori and Nagata took a trip to Tokyo. Whilst they were away, several URA members took the opportunity to desert the group. On 15 February, remaining group members discovered that police were aware of their whereabouts which led them to leave their training base. During their escape, two members were arrested. Mori and Nagata were also arrested upon return to the base to determine whether any group members remained. The members that had fled the training base took a dangerous route through the mountains to Nagano prefecture in order to avoid leaving traces of footsteps and the strong odor of dead bodies that they carried due to lack of bathing facilities. The following day, the group members split into two groups. One group was arrested shortly after at Karuizawa train station, having been reported by members of the public as suspicious due to their "bedraggled" look.

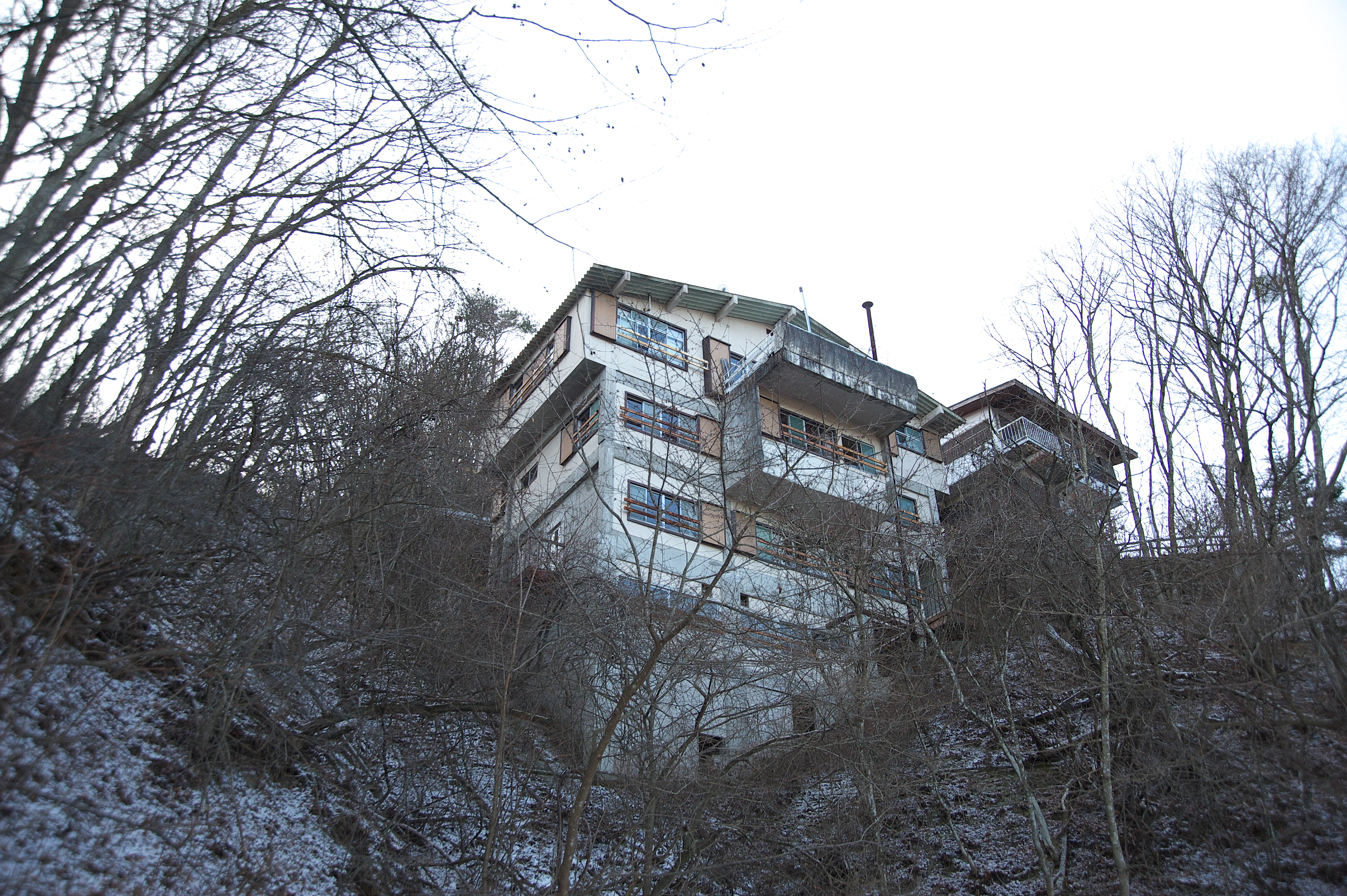
Asama Sanso Lodge pictured in 2009

The remaining group, consisting of five members, were chased by police into a lodge at the base of Mount Asama. Here the members took hostage of the lodge keeper's wife. A nine-day siege ensued which saw the mountain sealed off and 3 000 riot police on scene. The police did not close in on the group despite several exchanges of gunfire in order to protect the hostage. Before the police cut off power to the lodge after a few days, group members watched media coverage of the siege on TV. On the 28th of February, the tenth and final day of the incident, the police brought in a wrecking ball to destroy the entrance of the lodge and fired water mixed with teargas into the building to assist police in their room-by-room search. After a battle that lasted eight hours and the killing of two police officers, the members and their hostage were found taking shelter behind a mattress on the top floor of the building. This event was viewed on 90% of Japan's television screens and became known as the Asama-Sanso incident.

== Public perception ==
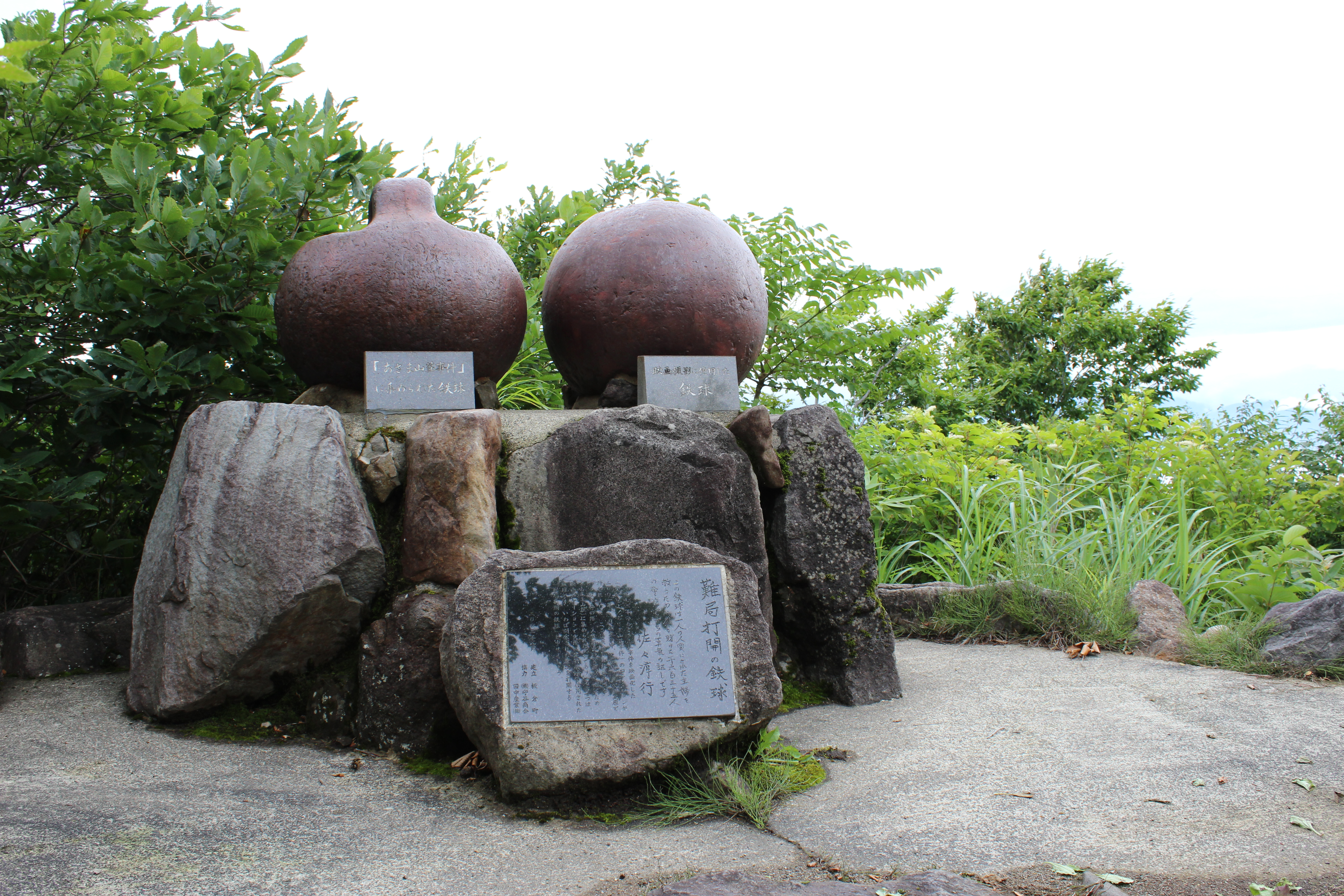
Wrecking ball memorial in recognition of the Asama-Sansō incident

Initially after the siege, public perception of the group was markedly less negative than what it would become. In the month following the Asama-Sanso incident, there was significant coverage relating to the interrogation of group members. With police having provided information about the group's killings, media communicated an image of the URA that associated "armed resistance with the murder of comrades". This saw a shift in public perception. This sentiment was conveyed by a student who was interviewed for one of Japan's most noteworthy news publications, the Asahi Shimbun. This student remarked "When they were captured without being completely defeated, I thought that they were definitely revolutionaries, and I felt a sense of resistance when adults labelled them a crazed group. But I can't understand the logic of the lynchings. I lost the will to defend them". Further, another student reported "Although I am, if anything, right wing, I understand the United Red Army members' feelings ... Whichever way you look at it, Japan resembles a police state. In challenging the system, their battles have to take such [combative] forms".

== Convictions ==
In the initial stages of the investigation, group members refused to give information to police. Mori wrote to police in the month following the Asama Sanso incident to take responsibility for the killings and to ask for the group members bodies to be returned to their families. This was interpreted as an act of weakness by other members of the group, who felt betrayed given that Mori had punished other members for more trivial matters. Following his speaking up, other members began to cooperate with police by providing statements. Each group member was given two options to choose from in how they could be tried by the courts. He or she could remain as in the collective and face a group trial given that the crimes were committed together, or be tried individually although this would result in being perceived as a traitor. Seven members, including Mori, opted to be tried together. However, Mori committed suicide in prison on 1 January 1973 before making it to trial. Bando, one of the seven who had opted to be tried as a group, was released by authorities before trial at the demand of the Japanese Red Army (JRA). The JRA also demanded the release of Sakaguchi; however, he chose to remain to face trial, Another two of the seven defected before trial, leaving only Nagata, Sakaguchi and Uegaki to face collective trial. Nagata and Sakaguchi were ultimately sentenced to death, whilst Uegaki received a 20-year sentence.

Nagata died on 5 February 2011 from a brain tumor while still being held in a detention facility. Sakaguchi's first application for a retrial was rejected by the Supreme Court in 2013. He remained on death row as of August 2026.

== Legacy ==
The group is the subject of the 2007 film United Red Army, directed by Kōji Wakamatsu and a 2019 documentary The United Red Army: A Troubled Legacy by NHK World-Japan with interviews of surviving members of the group.

== See also ==
- Red Army Faction (Japan)
- Japanese Red Army
- New Left in Japan
