= Tsuneo Mori =

Japanese radical leftist and terrorist

- 森 恒夫
- Born: December 6, 1944; Osaka, Japan
- Died: January 1, 1973 (aged 28); Tokyo Detention House, Katsushika ward, Tokyo, Japan
- Cause of death: suicide by hanging
- Education: Osaka City University
- Years active: 1965-1972
- Organization(s): Second Bund; Red Army Faction; United Red Army
- Movement: Communism, New Left

Tsuneo Mori (森 恒夫, Mori Tsuneo; December 6, 1944 – January 1, 1973) was a Japanese radical leftist and terrorist. He was born in Osaka and entered the Osaka City University where he became involved in leftist politics, eventually joining the Red Army Faction, which was a schismatic militant subfaction of the Japan Communist League. After many members of the Red Army Faction were arrested by the Japanese police with Mori remaining at large, several members of the group went to North Korea with Japan Airlines Flight 351 and some formed the Japanese Red Army. Mori remained in Japan and eventually became the leader of the United Red Army. Along with Hiroko Nagata, he allegedly killed 12 members and he was arrested in February 1972. He committed suicide by hanging in his cell in Tokyo on January 1, 1973.
