= Communist League (Japan) =

Japanese Marxist student organization

Communist League 共産主義者同盟 Kyо̄sanshugisha Dо̄mei
- Abbreviation: The Bund
- Founded: December 1958
- Dissolved: July 1960
- Preceded by: Zengakuren (internal schism)
- Succeeded by: Second Bund
- Ideology: Marxism; Communism; Anti-Stalinism; Trotskyism
- Political position: Far-left

The Communist League (共産主義者同盟; Kyо̄sanshugisha Dо̄mei), sometimes abbreviated Kyōsandō and better known by its nickname The Bund (ブント, Bunto), was a Marxist Japanese proto-New Left student organization established in December 1958 as a radical splinter group within the nationwide Zengakuren student federation. The organization took its name from the original Communist League (German: Bund der Kommunisten) established in London, England in 1847 under the guidance of Karl Marx and Friedrich Engels, whence it derived its nickname "The Bund."

After successfully seizing control of Zengakuren through a variety of electioneering efforts, the Bund carried out a number of protest activities in the late 1950s and early 1960s, including playing a starring role in the massive 1960 Anpo protests against the U.S.-Japan Security Treaty, before splitting into a number of smaller groups.

Although lasting only for a few years, the Bund is widely cited as marking the origins of "New Left"-style student activism in Japan.

In 1966, some remnant factions of the original group reunited to form the Second Bund (第二次ブント, Dainiji Bunto), which carried out a variety of protest activities during the 1968–69 Japanese university protests. The Second Bund's "Red Army Faction" splinter group would become the progenitor of two notorious terrorist groups, the United Red Army and the Japan Red Army.

== Formation ==
The Bund was established by radical student activists who sought to break free from the influence of the Japan Communist Party (JCP), which had facilitated the formation of the Zengakuren federation in 1948, and had strongly influenced its actions in the decade that followed.

Anger among students at the JCP had been growing over the course of the 1950s. In the early postwar period, the JCP had pursued a "peaceful line" of attempting to gradually build support for communism while winning over voters in elections. However, in 1951, in response to the so-called "Cominform Criticism" issued by the Soviet-backed Cominform at the urging of Soviet Premier Joseph Stalin, which demanded that the JCP abandon its "peaceful line" and pursue immediate, violent communist revolution in Japan, the JCP had ordered the student activists to go into the mountains to form "mountain village guerrilla squads" and foment the violent revolution Stalin had demanded. However, when Japanese voters vented their anger at the JCP in the 1952 general election, stripping the party of all 35 of its National Diet seats, the JCP rapidly reversed course, returning to its former peaceful line and even blaming the student activists themselves for the violence.

Student anger was compounded by the JCP's failure to denounce Stalinism or renounce ties with the Soviet Union following the revelations of Stalin's crimes in Nikita Khrushchev's "Secret Speech" in February 1956 and the USSR's brutal suppression of the Hungarian Revolution later that same year.

In fact, in an attempt to win back voters with extreme moderacy, the JCP urged Zengakuren student activists to refrain from contentious protests or strikes of any kind and instead focus their energies on organizing sporting events, potlucks, and other social activities. However, many of the student activists who would go on to found the Bund refused to follow this advice and instead took part in the violent Sunagawa Struggle against expansion of the U.S. air base at Tachikawa, which the JCP condemned and refused to condone. Having gotten a taste of "direct action" in the Sunagawa Struggle, the radical students wanted to pursue similar struggles in the future.

Thoroughly disgusted at the JCP for having "betrayed" the students who had fought in the "mountain village guerrilla squads" and then attempted to prevent them from taking direct action to fight for farmers and the working classes and pursue a communist revolution, the Bund students finally split with the JCP in December 1958, declaring the twin pillars of their platform to be "anti-Imperialism" (i.e. anti-U.S. bases and anti-U.S.-Japan Security Treaty) and "anti-Stalinism" (i.e. anti-JCP), and vowing "unceasing" resistance to the "bureaucratic Yoyogi faction" (i.e. the students still adhering to the commandments of the JCP, which was headquartered in Tokyo's Yoyogi district). In return, the JCP-linked factions denounced the new group as "Trotskyite provocateurs" advocating "extreme-left adventurism."

== Seizing control of Zengakuren ==
Over the course of 1959, the Bund worked in concert with another Zengakuren splinter group, a group of students affiliated with Trotskyist philosopher Kan'ichi Kuroda's Revolutionary Communist League (abbreviated Kakukyōdō in Japanese), to seize control of the Zengakuren-member student associations (jichikai) at colleges and universities across Japan, in some cases, Bund leaders later confessed, by rigging leadership elections.

By November 1959, the Bund and the Kakukyōdō-affiliated students had gained control of approximately 60% of the Zengakuren jichikai, becoming the "mainstream faction" (shūryū-ha) and making them strong enough to elect charismatic Bund member Kentarō Karōji chairman of the entire Zengakuren organization and redirect the federation's protests toward more confrontational "direct action," over and against the wishes of the JCP and the JCP-linked "anti-mainstream faction" (han-shūryū-ha) of the Zengakuren.

== The Anpo protests ==
On November 27, 1959, as part of the Anpo protests against proposed revision the U.S.-Japan Security Treaty, Bund members led Zengakuren students to smash their way into Japan's National Diet compound, where they proceeded to dance and sing protest songs for several hours before disbanding peacefully. This "violent" action drew condemnation from the JCP and other members of the nationwide coalition organized to protest the Security Treaty.

The Bund was undeterred however, and in January 1960, helped organize a sit-in in Tokyo's Haneda Airport to try to physically block Prime Minister Nobusuke Kishi from traveling to Washington, D.C. to sign the new treaty.

Finally on June 15, 1960, at the climax of the protests, the Bund led students in once again smashing their way into the Diet compound to show their anger at the Treaty. This time, however, they were met by hundreds of police armed with truncheons, who attempted to force them back out, precipitating a bloody struggle that lasted for many hours, long into the night. It was during this violent confrontation that female Bund activist Michiko Kanba was killed, shocking the nation and helping to precipitate the fall of the Kishi cabinet.

However, despite helping bring about the resignation of Kishi and the cancellation of a planned visit to Japan by U.S. President Dwight D. Eisenhower, the Anpo protests failed to stop the revision of the Security Treaty, which took effect on June 19, 1960, bringing the protest movement to an end.

== Dissolution ==
In July 1960, just after the end of the protests, the Bund dissolved into a number of warring factions over the question of who was to blame for the failure of the Anpo protests to stop the treaty from taking effect. These warring factions would later undergo further schisms, leading to the formation of a number of the New Left student "sects" that carried out the 1968–69 Japanese university protests and other activities such as the 1970 Anpo protests and the Sanrizuka Struggle against the construction of Narita Airport.

== Differences from the New Left ==
Although the Bund is often considered a "New Left" group, historian Nick Kapur argues that it represented more of a "transitional" stage between the "old" and "new" left in Japan. Kapur points out that unlike later New Left groups in Japan, such as the Zenkyōtō ("All-Campus Joint-Struggle Councils") that carried out the 1968–1969 university protests, which disdained hierarchy and valorized egalitarianism and direct democracy, the Bund was organized according to a strict hierarchy and practiced "Old Left"-style democratic centralism. Kapur also argues that whereas the Bund was outward-looking and characterized by "brightness," later New Left groups tended to be inward-looking and often morosely serious. However, historian Kenji Hasegawa emphasizes that the Bund nevertheless played a crucial role as midwife to the Japanese New Left by helping the student movement decisively break free of the influence of the Japan Communist Party.

== Second Bund ==
Although the nationwide Bund organization splintered in July 1960, the local Bund organization in the Kansai region of central Japan remained united. In 1966, the Kansai Bund merged with some other splinter groups to re-form the Communist League as a nationwide organization, which came to be nicknamed the "Second Bund" (Dainiji Bunto). The Second Bund would later join with two other radical student sects, Chūkaku-ha and Kaihō-ha to form the "Three-Faction Zengakuren" (Sanpa Zengakuren) which carried out a number of violent protest actions in the latter half of the 1960s. It was the Second Bund's "Red Army Faction" (Sekigun-ha) splinter group that would become the progenitor of two infamous Japanese New Left terrorist groups, the United Red Army and the Japan Red Army.

== Notable members (original Bund) ==
- Masahiko Aoki
- Kōji Ikuta
- Michiko Kanba
- Kōjin Karatani
- Kōyama Ken'ichi
- Kentarō Karōji
- Minoru Morita
- Susumu Nishibe
- Shigeo Shima
- Takeo Shimizu

== Notable members (Second Bund) ==
- Tsuneo Mori
- Fusako Shigenobu
- Takaya Shiomi
- Moriaki Wakabayashi
