= Lod Airport massacre =

1972 terrorist attack in Tel Aviv, Israel

- The attack site
- Location: 31°59′42″N 34°53′39″E; Lod Airport outside Tel Aviv, Israel
- Date: 30 May 1972; 54 years ago 12:04 – 12:28
- Attack type: Shooting spree, mass shooting, mass murder
- Weapons: vz. 58 assault rifles and grenades
- Deaths: 26 (+2 attackers)
- Injuries: 80 (+1 attacker)
- Perpetrator: Japanese Red Army (guided by PFLP)
- No. of participants: 3

The Lod Airport massacre was an attack that was carried out by the Japanese Red Army on the Lod Airport (now Ben Gurion International Airport) near Tel Aviv on 30 May 1972. It resulted in the killing of 26 people and the wounding of 80 others. Two of the attackers (Tsuyoshi Okudaira and Yasuyuki Yasuda) were killed, while a third (Kōzō Okamoto) was captured after being wounded.

The dead comprised 17 Christian pilgrims from Puerto Rico, a Canadian citizen, and eight Israelis, including Aharon Katzir, an internationally renowned protein biophysicist. Katzir was head of the Israeli National Academy of Sciences, a popular scientific radio show host, and a likely frontrunner in the upcoming Israeli presidential election. His brother, Ephraim Katzir, was elected President of Israel the following year.

Because airport security was focused on the possibility of a Palestinian attack, the use of Japanese attackers took the guards by surprise. The attack has often been described as a suicide mission, but it has also been asserted that it was the outcome of an unpublicized larger operation that went awry. The three perpetrators had been trained in Baalbek, Lebanon; the actual planning was handled by Wadie Haddad (a.k.a. Abu Hani), head of PFLP External Operations, with some input from Okamoto. In the immediate aftermath, Der Spiegel speculated that funding had been provided by some of the $5 million ransom paid by the West German government in exchange for the hostages of hijacked Lufthansa Flight 649 in February 1972.

== Attack ==
At 10 p.m. the attackers arrived at the airport aboard an Air France flight from Rome. Dressed conservatively and carrying slim violin cases, they attracted little attention. As they entered the waiting area, they opened up their violin cases and extracted Czech vz. 58 assault rifles with the butt stocks removed. They began to fire indiscriminately at airport staff and visitors, which included a group of pilgrims from Puerto Rico, and tossed grenades as they changed magazines. Yasuda was accidentally shot dead by one of the other attackers, and Okudaira moved from the airport building into the landing area, firing at passengers disembarking from an El Al aircraft before being killed by one of his own grenades, either due to accidental premature explosion or as a suicide. Okamoto was shot by security, brought to the ground by an El Al employee, and arrested as he attempted to leave the terminal. Whether the attackers were responsible for killing all of the victims has been disputed, as some victims may have been caught in the crossfire of the attackers and airport security.

== Aftermath ==
The Japanese public initially reacted with disbelief to initial reports that the perpetrators of the massacre were Japanese until a Japanese embassy official sent to the hospital confirmed that Okamoto was a Japanese national. Okamoto told the diplomat that he had nothing personal against the Israeli people, but that he had to do what he did because "It was my duty as a soldier of the revolution." Okamoto was tried by an Israeli military tribunal and sentenced to life imprisonment in June 1972. During his trial, he actively undermined his own defense, and in particular protested his lawyer's requests for a psychiatric evaluation, but managed to avoid the death penalty by pleading guilty. Okamoto served only 13 years of his prison sentence. He was released in 1985 with more than 1,000 other prisoners in an exchange for captured Israeli soldiers. He settled in Lebanon's Bekaa Valley. He was arrested in 1997 for passport forgery and visa violations, but in 2000 was granted political refugee status in Lebanon. He was still wanted by the Japanese government as of 2021. Four other JRA members arrested at the same time were extradited to Japan.

Reflecting on the attack, JRA leader Fusako Shigenobu stated that while Japanese people were accustomed to sacrificing themselves for their nation, it was rare for Japanese people to sacrifice themselves for others, in this case, Palestinians.

In response to the attack, the PFLP's spokesman, Ghassan Kanafani, was assassinated by the Mossad a few weeks later. Mossad agents planted a bomb in his car that detonated after he turned on the ignition. Kanafani's 17-year-old niece was also killed.

Various news media have claimed that the primary organizer of the attack, Wadie Haddad, was assassinated by Mossad, although official records state he died of leukemia.

=== Lod Massacre Remembrance Day and Memorial ===
In June 2006 a legislative initiative (Senate Bill (PS) 1535) by José Garriga Picó, a senator of Puerto Rico, was approved by unanimous vote of both houses of the Legislative Assembly of Puerto Rico, making every 30 May 'Lod Massacre Remembrance Day'. The initiative was signed into law on 2 August 2006 by Governor Aníbal Acevedo Vilá, making 30 May 2007, the 35th anniversary of the massacre, the first official 'Lod Massacre Remembrance Day' in Puerto Rico. The purpose of Lod Massacre Remembrance Day is to commemorate those events, to remember and honor both those murdered and those who survived, and to educate the Puerto Rican public against terrorism.

The Legislative Assembly subsequently commissioned a Lod Massacre Memorial adjacent to its Holocaust Memorial south of the Puerto Rico Capitol. The Lod Massacre Memorial was installed in 2012. It consists of a granite tablet describing the Lod Massacre and listing the names of the 17 American citizens, all from Puerto Rico, who died at the Tel Aviv airport when visiting as part of a religious pilgrimage. It also includes a time capsule. The text in English reads:

The Lod Airport massacre revealed the power of terrorist ideology to incite murder. A new form of violence, targeting civilian non-combatants with the intent to create a mood of fear and intimidation, became a means for terrorists to popularize extremist political and social agendas.

On May 30, 1972, three terrorists supported by the General Command of the Popular Front of the Liberation of Palestine, perpetuated a massacre at the Lod airport in Israel, firing indiscriminately against passengers waiting for their luggage. Among them was a group of Puerto Ricans eagerly awaiting pilgrimage in the Holy Land. This cowardly terrorist attack left seventy-eight wounded people, twenty six killed; seventeen were Puerto Ricans.

The memory of these blessed souls remain alive in the hearts of the survivors and in the collective memory of both nations, Puerto Rico and Israel..

— Puerto Rico Memorial of the Lod Massacre, San Juan

=== North Korea trial ===
In 2008, the eight surviving children of Carmelo Calderón Molina, who was killed in the attack, and Pablo Tirado, the son of Pablo Tirado Ayala, who was wounded, filed a lawsuit in the United States District Court for the District of Puerto Rico. They sued the government of North Korea for providing material support to the PFLP and the JRA and for planning the attack. The plaintiffs claimed a right to sue the North Korean government based on the Foreign Sovereign Immunities Act of 1976. Preliminary hearings to examine evidence began on 2 December 2009, with district judge Francisco Besosa presiding. The North Korean government did not respond to the lawsuit and had no representatives present. The victims' families were represented by attorneys from the Shurat HaDin Israel Law Center, including its founder, Nitsana Darshan-Leitner.

In July 2010, the U.S. court ordered North Korea to pay US$378 million to families as compensation for the terror attack.

== See also ==
- Lydda massacre (1948)
