= Hiroko Nagata =

Japanese activist

- Nagata in an undated photo
- Born: February 8, 1945; Tokyo, Empire of Japan
- Died: February 5, 2011 (aged 65); Tokyo Detention Center, Tokyo, Japan
- Occupation: Leftist radical
- Status: Deceased
- Conviction: Murder
- Penalty: Death

Hiroko Nagata (永田 洋子, Nagata Hiroko; February 8, 1945 – February 5, 2011), sometimes mistakenly referred to as Yōko Nagata, was a Japanese leftist revolutionary and terrorist who was convicted of murder and sentenced to death. She was convicted of murdering, or participating in the murders of, fellow members of the United Red Army (URA) during a group purge in Gunma Prefecture in February 1972.

During the purge, Nagata, acting as vice-chairman of the URA, directed the killing of twelve members of the group by beatings or by forced exposure to frigid winter air temperatures. A civilian who was not a member of the URA who was present during the purge was also killed. Arrested on February 16, 1972, Nagata was tried, convicted, and sentenced to death for her participation in the killings. While awaiting execution, Nagata died from brain cancer on February 5, 2011, at the Tokyo Detention House.

== Biography ==
Hiroko Nagata was born in Tokyo and, after graduation from Chofu Gakuen High School, entered Kyoritsu College of Pharmacy (defunct in 2008 and merged into Keio University) to receive training to be a pharmacist. During her time in college, Nagata became involved full-time in left wing politics, eventually becoming vice-chairman of the United Red Army (URA). Nagata would work herself into what was described as an "hysterical rage" when excited, usually over political issues. She was (by the standard of medicine of that time) infertile from Basedow syndrome. Nagata was particularly harsh with other female members of her group.

== Purge incident ==
Japan's leftist student movement in the 1960s pervaded the country's universities, and, by late in the decade, had become balkanised, competitive, and violent. After a series of incidents in which student groups injured or killed law enforcement officials as well as the general public, Japan's National Police Agency cracked down on these organizations, raiding their hideouts and arresting dozens in 1971 and 1972. Attempting to escape from the police, a core group of radicals from the URA, including Nagata, retreated to a compound in the mountains of Gunma Prefecture during the winter of 1972.

During the second week of February 1972 at the compound, Nagata and the URA's chairman, Tsuneo Mori, initiated a violent purge of the group's members. In the purge, Nagata and Mori directed the beating deaths of eight members and one non-member who happened to be present. Six other members were tied to trees outside, subsequently freezing to death in the extremely cold weather. Nagata especially targeted members who, in her opinion, "took too much interest in relations with women and did not devote enough ardour to the revolution." A few were killed for "attempting to escape"; one member was killed for asking for some tissue paper while inside his sleeping bag, an act that Nagata apparently construed as having a sexual significance.

On February 16, police arrested Mori, Nagata, and six other URA members both at the compound and at a nearby village. Five others, armed with rifles and shotguns, managed to escape, fleeing on foot through the mountains towards Karuizawa in nearby Nagano Prefecture, eventually taking refuge in a mountain guest lodge, initiating the Asama-Sansō incident.

== Criminal trial, sentence, illness, and death ==
Nagata was sentenced to death in the Tokyo District Court on June 18, 1982. On September 26, 1986, the Tokyo High Court upheld her death sentence. On February 19, 1993, the Supreme Court of Japan upheld her death sentence. Nagata submitted a plea for a retrial, which was declined by the courts on November 28, 2006.

Nagata wrote several books during her time in prison and attracted the attention of a support group. Her supporters reported that she had suffered from declining health, including a brain tumor, for several years which had gone untreated. Nagata underwent surgery for a brain tumor in 1984. She collapsed from brain atrophy in 2006 and was transferred to a medical prison in Hachioji. Nagata returned to the Tokyo Detention House in 2007, but was bedridden.

On October 11, 2008, it was revealed that Nagata had fallen into a critical condition due to the tumor, so her family was called for visitation to the Tokyo Detention Center. Nagata died on February 5, 2011.
