= Council of Government =

Council of Government may refer to:

== Spain ==
- Government of the Community of Madrid, executive and administrative body of the autonomous community of Madrid
- Council of Government of the Principality of Asturias, the executive branch of the General Junta of Asturias, an autonomous community
- Council of Government of the Region of Murcia, executive and administrative body of the autonomous community of the Region of Murcia

== United States ==
- Councils of governments, a number of regional councils in the United States, also known as planning districts and other names
  - Councils of governments in California
  - Councils of governments in Connecticut
  - Councils of governments in North Carolina
  - Deep East Texas Council of Governments

== Others ==
- Council of Government of Brazil, an advisory body to the President of Brazil
- Council of Government of Luxembourg, the governing body in Luxembourg
- Council of Government of Malta, historical bodies
  - 1870 Maltese Council of Government referendum
- Council of Government of Monaco, the Prince of Monaco's governing body
- Council of Government of the Philippines, two incarnations in the Philippines
- Council of Government of South Australia, a government body in early colonial days (1836–1843)
- Council of Government of Vietnam, former executive organ body of the Vietnamese government, 1959 to 1980

== See also ==
- Council
- National Council (disambiguation)
- National Council of Government (disambiguation)
- Supreme Council of Government, a military junta which acted as head of state and head of government of Ecuador from 1976 to 1979
