= 2017 People's Climate March =

Climate change protests in the United States

People's Climate March
- Part of the climate movement
- People's Climate Movement logo
- Date: April 29, 2017 (except April 22 for Madison, Wisconsin)
- Location: United States
- Caused by: Environmental policy of the first Donald Trump administration

The People's Climate March was a protest which took place on Washington, D.C.'s National Mall, and at locations throughout the United States on April 29, 2017. The organizers were the People's Climate Movement. They announced the demonstration in January 2017 to protest the environmental policies of the then U.S. President Donald Trump and his administration. The protests were held at the end of his first 100 days as president, during stormy weather across the U.S. There were an estimated 200,000 participants in the D.C. march.

== Locations across the United States ==
The event in Augusta, Maine was organized by the Natural Resources Council of Maine and took place outside the Maine State House. Dylan Voorhees, director of the organization's Climate and Clean Energy Project, spoke at the rally.

The event in Boston was organized by Boston People's Climate Mobilization, with special efforts from Lisa Young of the Better Future Project, Cambridge, Massachusetts.

In Illinois, demonstrations were planned at two places. One in Chicago's Federal Plaza and the other at Main Square Park in Highland. The Highland event was organized by Heather Leddy and Alex Bazan. It was free to attend, however the organizers accepted jugs of water, NSF-53 water filters, and donations to aid East Chicago residents affected by lead contamination.

In Columbus, Ohio, marchers started at COSI and ended at the Ohio Statehouse.

The Erie, Pennsylvania demonstration was organized by Our Water, Our Air, Our Rights, co-sponsored by the Erie Benedictines for Peace, Unitarian Universalist Congregation of Erie, Sisters of St. Joseph, S.O.N.S. of Lake Erie, Sisters of Mercy, Benedictine Sisters of Erie, and Solar Revolution Erie, The event was endorsed by the Lake Erie Group and the Pennsylvania Chapter of the Sierra Club. Organizers anticipated up to 1,000 participants. Marchers started at the Lake Erie boat launch near East Avenue, passed the Erie Coke Corp. Planned, then headed south on East Avenue to Wayne Park at East Sixth Street for the rally. The demonstration in Florence, Alabama was sponsored by the Shoals Environmental Alliance and Indivisible Northwest Alabama, and took place outside the Lauderdale County Courthouse. The rally featured guest speakers and music by Mitch Mann and the Mojo Mixers, and was reportedly the only climate march organized in the U.S. states of Alabama, Georgia, or Mississippi.

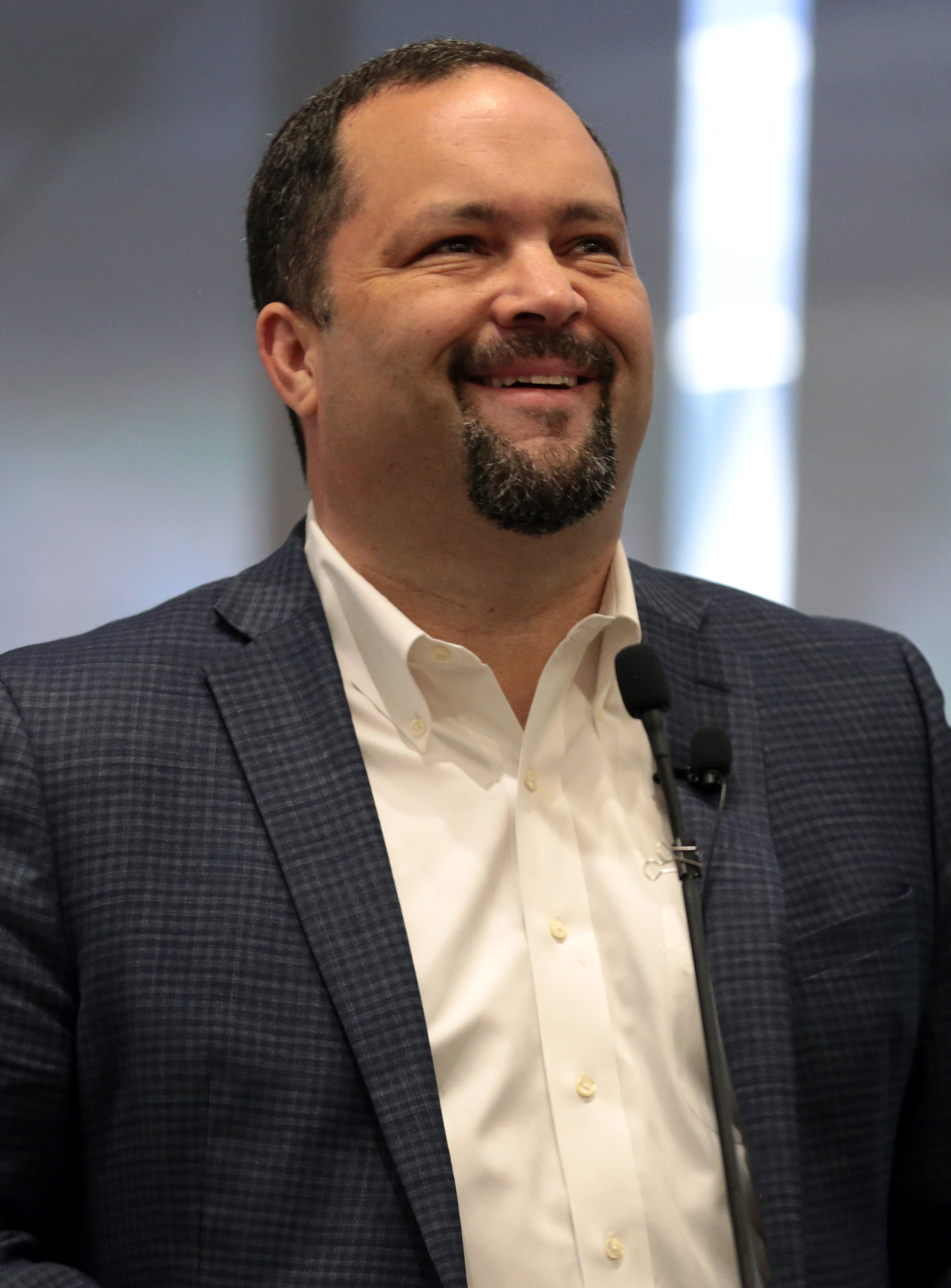
The event in Hagerstown, Maryland was organized by Benjamin Jealous (pictured in 2017), former president and chief executive offer of the National Association for the Advancement of Colored People (NAACP).

In Hagerstown, Maryland, former president and chief executive offer of the National Association for the Advancement of Colored People, Benjamin Jealous, lead a march and rally on April 30. Event attendees gathered at Public Square, then marched through the Arts and Entertainment District to City Park's Peter Buys Band Shell to listen to guest speakers and artists. Speakers included Brooke Harper, the Maryland/District of Columbia policy director for Chesapeake Climate Action Network who helps lead the Don't Frack Maryland Coalition, city council member Emily Keller, who also serves as the community advocacy chairman at the Hagerstown Chamber of Commerce GenNext Committee, Tekesha "FiyahFly" Martinez, and the president of the Labor Network for Sustainability, Joe Uehlein. Spoken word artist Maheen Haq, a University of Maryland Baltimore County Sondheim Scholar who organized the Interfaith Candle Vigil and Unity March, also performed.

Marches were held in Indiana. The Kansas City, Missouri event was held at Washington Square Park and featured guest speakers Bob Berkebile, founding chairman of the American Institute of Architects' National Committee on the Environment (AIA/COTE), Davis Hammet, who serves as president of the organization Loud Light, and Margaret J. May, who serves as executive director of the Ivanhoe Neighborhood Council and former chair of the Environmental Protection Agency National Environmental Justice Advisory Council. Sergio Moreno, an interfaith chaplain in the Clinical Pastoral Education program at Saint Luke's Hospital of Kansas City, John Reyna of the Lakota/Dakota Standing Rock Sioux tribe, Dr. Carissa Stanton, a pediatrician with the University of Kansas Health System, and Terrence Wise, who represents the National Organizing Committee, also spoke at the event. In Keene, New Hampshire, the Cities for Climate Protection program and the Committee Climate Action Team of the Monadnock Progressive Alliance organized a march along Main Street to Central Square. Scheduled speakers include Joel Huberman of the Citizens Climate Lobby, Michael Simpson, who serves as director at the Center for Climate Preparedness and Community Resilience at Antioch University New England, Duncan Watson, assistant director of public works, solid waste manager, and a guest speaker from The Climate Reality Project. The Monadnock Chapter of the Citizen's Climate Lobby also screened the film The Burden: Fossil Fuel, The Military and National Security at the Keene Public Library.

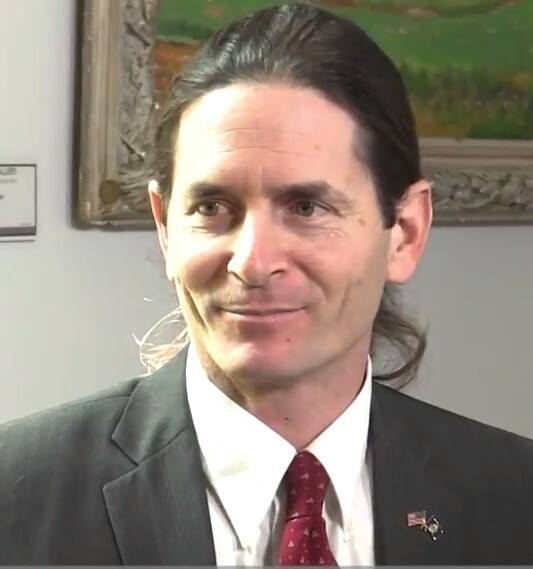
David Zuckerman, Lieutenant Governor of Vermont, is scheduled to speak at the demonstration in Montpelier.

Madison, Wisconsin's rally was held on April 22, in conjunction with Earth Day. Participants gathered outside the Wisconsin State Capitol and marched to the MG&E power plant. In Miami, an event was planned at José Martí Park. In Montpelier, Vermont, demonstrators gathered outside the State House. Supporting organizations included the Vermont Chapter of the Sierra Club, 350VT, Vermont Public Interest Research Group, Vermont Rights and Democracy, the Vermont Natural Resources Council, and Vermont Interfaith Power, with dozens more endorsing the event. Speakers included Reverend Arnold Davis, former State Representative Kesha Ram, Lieutenant Governor David Zuckerman, and performers included the Central Vermont Solidarity Singers, Chris Gruen, Headphone Jack, and Chad Hollister. The Oklahoma City event was held at Harkins Bricktown Plaza. After a rally with featuring guest speakers, music, and children's activities, marchers made their way the Oklahoma River for a Native American sacred water ceremony at the Devon Boathouse. Supporting organizations included the Asia Society of Oklahoma, Black Lives Matter OKC, BOLD Oklahoma, Citizens' Climate Lobby of Norman, Green Connections, Human Community Network, Indivisible Oklahoma, OK Conference of Churches Environmental Committee, Oklahoma Interfaith Power & Light, Oklahoma Progressive Network, Oklahoma Sierra Club, Oklahoma United Methodist Environmental Coalition, Peace House, Sierra Club Cimarron Group, Sierra Club Red Earth Group, SixTwelve, Turtle Rock Farm Retreat Center, and Your Earth, Our Future.

The Washington, D.C. demonstration was organized by People's Climate Movement, with Paul Getsos serving as national coordinator. More than 13,000 people had expressed interest in attending the event on Facebook by early February 2017.

=== California ===
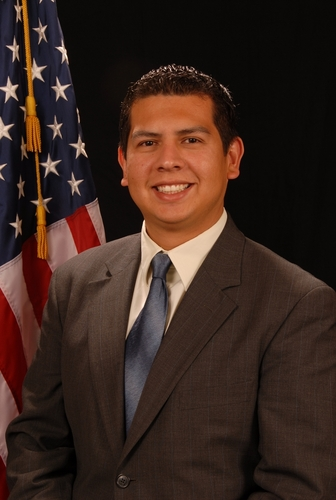
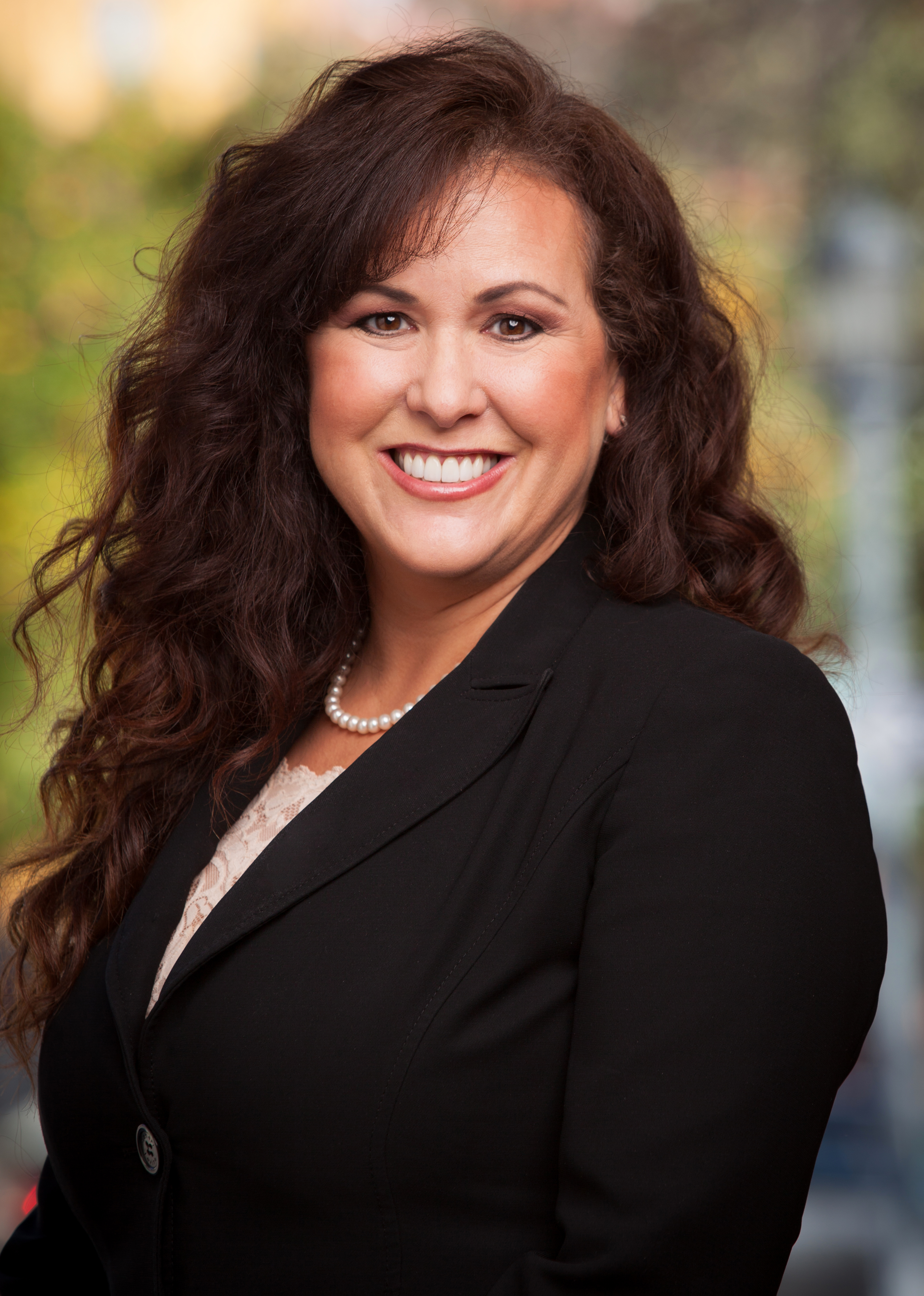
David Alvarez (left) and Lorena Gonzalez Fletcher (right) were scheduled to speak at the San Diego demonstration.

In California, demonstrations were held in Nevada City, San Diego, Oakland, San Jose and Sonoma. The Nevada City event was organized by Sierra Nevada Group/Sierra Club and featured a screening of The Future of Energy: Lateral Power to the People at Seaman's Lodge, followed by a march from Pioneer Park to Broad Street. San Diego participants gathered in front of the County Administration Center, along with Waterfront Park and San Diego Bay. Speakers included David Alvarez, Lorena Gonzalez Fletcher, and Rev. Dr. J. Lee Hill, Jr., who serves as Senior Pastor of the Christian Fellowship Congregational Church (UCC). In Sonoma, marchers started at First Congregational Church/Congregation Shir Shalom's Burlingame Hall, or outside Sonoma Valley High School and ended with a rally in the Sonoma Plaza. The demonstration was sponsored by Sonoma Climate Coalition. There was also a protest in Riverside.

=== Colorado ===
In Colorado, demonstrations were held in Denver's Civic Center Park, and in Durango, from the Durango and Silverton Narrow Gauge Railroad depot to Buckley Park. The Durango event featured activist and climber Kitty Calhoun, live music, and opportunities to test drive electric vehicles. Prior to the march, Citizens' Climate Lobby hosted two climate change educational events at Durango Public Library; the documentary film Merchants of Doubt (2014) was screened on April 27, and the April 28 event featured a presentation by Calhoun called "Last Assents" and a screening of the film, Age of Consequences.

=== Connecticut ===
The demonstration in Hartford was organized by Harrison Hayward, a medical student at the University of Connecticut, and took place at Mortensen Riverfront Plaza. New Haven's event was organized by Diane Krause, a professor at the Yale School of Medicine, and took place at East Rock Park. Preceding the march was a science fair; the rally also featured speakers from Wesleyan University and Yale University, as well as Robert Klee, who serves as commissioner of the Connecticut Department of Energy and Environmental Protection. Diane Lentakis, an organizer for 350 Connecticut and the Connecticut Sierra Club, coordinated several bus trips to transport people to the climate march in Washington, D.C.

=== Idaho ===
In Idaho, demonstrations were planned at the Idaho State Capitol in Boise, Driggs, and Sandpoint. Boise participants could attend a happy hour party to make signs for the event at IRU Headquarters on April 28. The Driggs march began at the courthouse and ended at the city park; local nonprofit groups were on site, manning tables and providing educational information. A sign making party was held at the local library on April 27. The Sandpoint march started at Farmin Park and ended at Community Hall where a presentation on Citizens' Climate Lobby was made and local nonprofit groups were on site, manning tables and providing educational information.

=== Massachusetts ===
The Massachusetts marches began at several different sites around Greater Boston and converged on the Boston Common around noon on Saturday, April 29, 2017. The event in Boston was organized by Boston People's Climate Mobilization, specifically by Lisa Young of the Better Future Project in Cambridge, Massachusetts.

=== Michigan ===
The events in Kalamazoo, Grand Rapids, Bay City, Marquette, Detroit, and Traverse City were organized by Michigan Climate Action Network, the MI League of Conservation Voters, and many other organizations. Debbie Stabenow and State Rep. Jon Hoadley spoke at the Kalamazoo event.

=== New York ===
The Plattsburgh demonstration was organized by Adam Guillette and took place at Trinity Park. Supporting organizations included 350 Plattsburgh, Adirondack Women's March, North Country RESPECT, and Plattsburgh-Adirondack Building Bridges. Speakers at the rally preceding the march included City Councilor Rachelle Armstrong, wildlife advocate John Davis, Mayor Colin Read, and scientist Dr. Curt Stager, as well as other local activists. From the park, marchers followed Broad Street, to Rugar Street, to the State University of New York at Plattsburgh's Amity Plaza, before returning to Trinity Park. The Syracuse demonstration was a march from Franklin Square Park, north along the Onondaga Creekwalk to a rally in the Inner Harbor neighborhood. More than 500 people took part.

=== North Carolina ===
The event in Asheville was organized by the local chapter of the Indivisible movement and took place at Pack Square's Vance Monument. The rally, which was emceed by Drew Jones of Climate Interactive, began with a Native American healing ceremony, followed by speeches by Buncombe County Commission chairman Brownie Newman, environmental and justice advocates, students, and clergy. Leading up to the march, the Sierra Club sponsored a screening of the film Before the Flood (2016) on April 21, and The Block off Biltmore screened the documentary film Cowspiracy (2014) on April 23.

Another march with a corresponding rally was held in Charlotte.

=== Oregon ===
In Oregon, demonstrations were planned in Bend's Drake Park, Medford, and Portland. Portland's event was organized by OPAL Environmental Justice and the Oregon Just Transition Alliance, and was held at Dawson Park.

=== Washington ===
In Washington, demonstrations were planned in Port Angeles and Walla Walla. Speakers in Port Angeles included Chad Bowechop, who manages the Makah Tribal Council Office of Marine Affairs, Jefferson County Commissioner Kate Dean, Clallam County commissioner Mark Ozias, Jon Preston of Forks City Council, author and activist Dianna Somerville, and Port Townsend Mayor Deborah Stinson. The march, which was organized by Sierra Club North Olympic Group and the Olympic Climate Action group, began at Port Angeles City Pier, went through downtown, then returned to the pier.

== Partners ==
The following organizations are listed as steering committee members on the event's official website:

- 32BJ SEIU
- 350.org
- 1199SEIU United Healthcare Workers East
- Alliance for Climate Education
- Amalgamated Transit Union
- American Federation of Teachers
- American Postal Workers Union
- The B Team
- BlueGreen Alliance
- Center for Biological Diversity
- Center for Community Change
- Center for Popular Democracy
- Chesapeake Climate Action Network
- Chispa
- Climate Justice Alliance
- Climate Nexus
- Climate Reality Project
- Color of Change
- Communications Workers of America
- Earthjustice
- Emerald Cities Collaborative
- EMPOWER
- Engage Virginia
- Environmental Justice Leadership Forum on Climate Change
- Franciscan Action Network
- Grassroots Global Justice
- GreenFaith
- GreenLatinos
- Green for All
- Hip Hop Caucus
- Indigenous Environmental Network
- Labor Network for Sustainability
- League of Conservation Voters
- Maryland Working Families
- Moms Clean Air Force
- National Association for the Advancement of Colored People (NAACP)
- Native Organizers Alliance
- Natural Resources Defense Council
- NextGen America
- Oceana
- One Earth. One Voice.
- People's Action
- People's Collective Arts/Colectivo de Arte Popular
- People's Climate Movement NY
- Power Shift Network
- Public Citizen
- Service Employees International Union
- Sierra Club
- Sojourners
- Union of Concerned Scientists
- UPROSE
- US Climate Action Network
- Win Without War

== Gallery ==
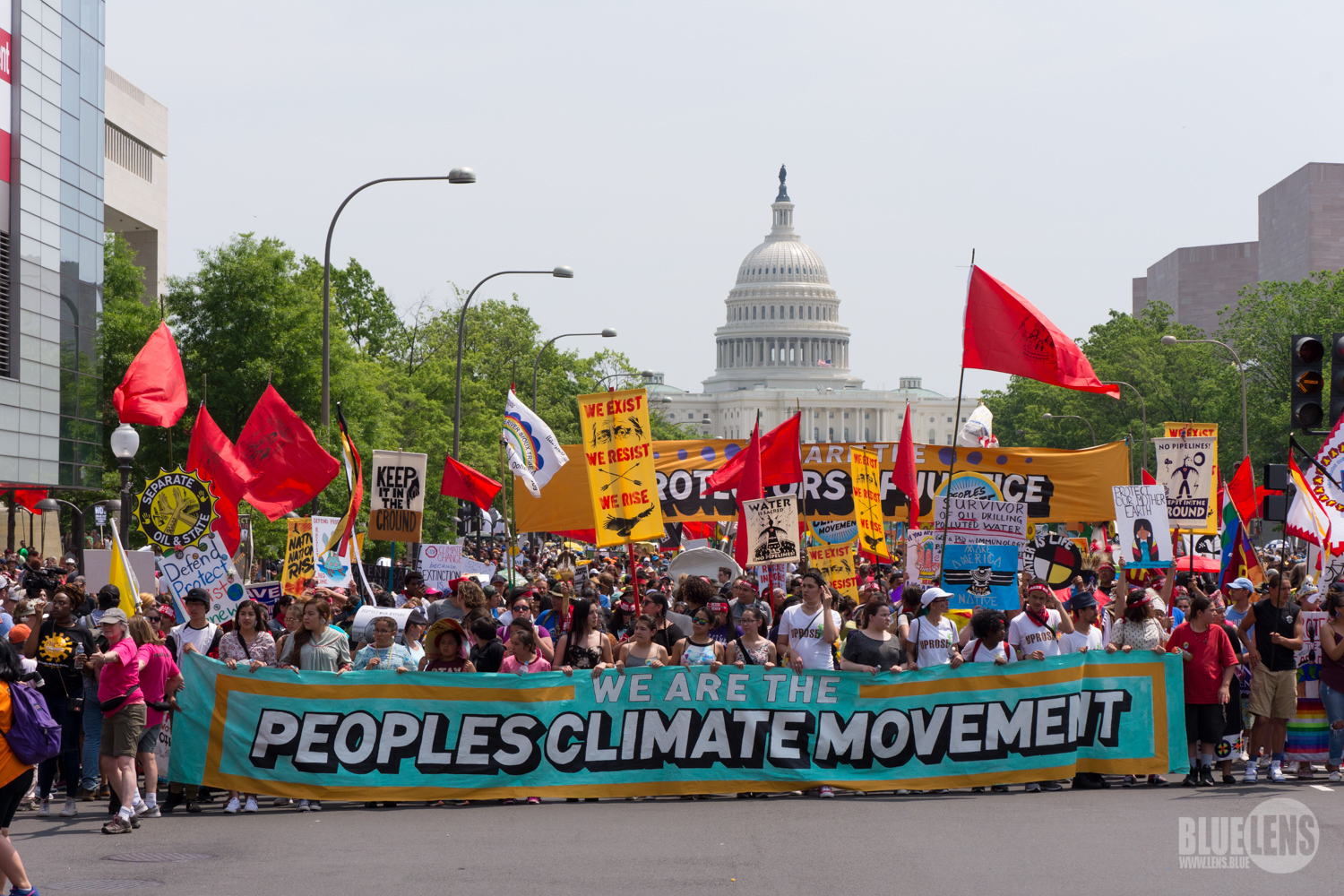
Demonstrators in Washington, DC

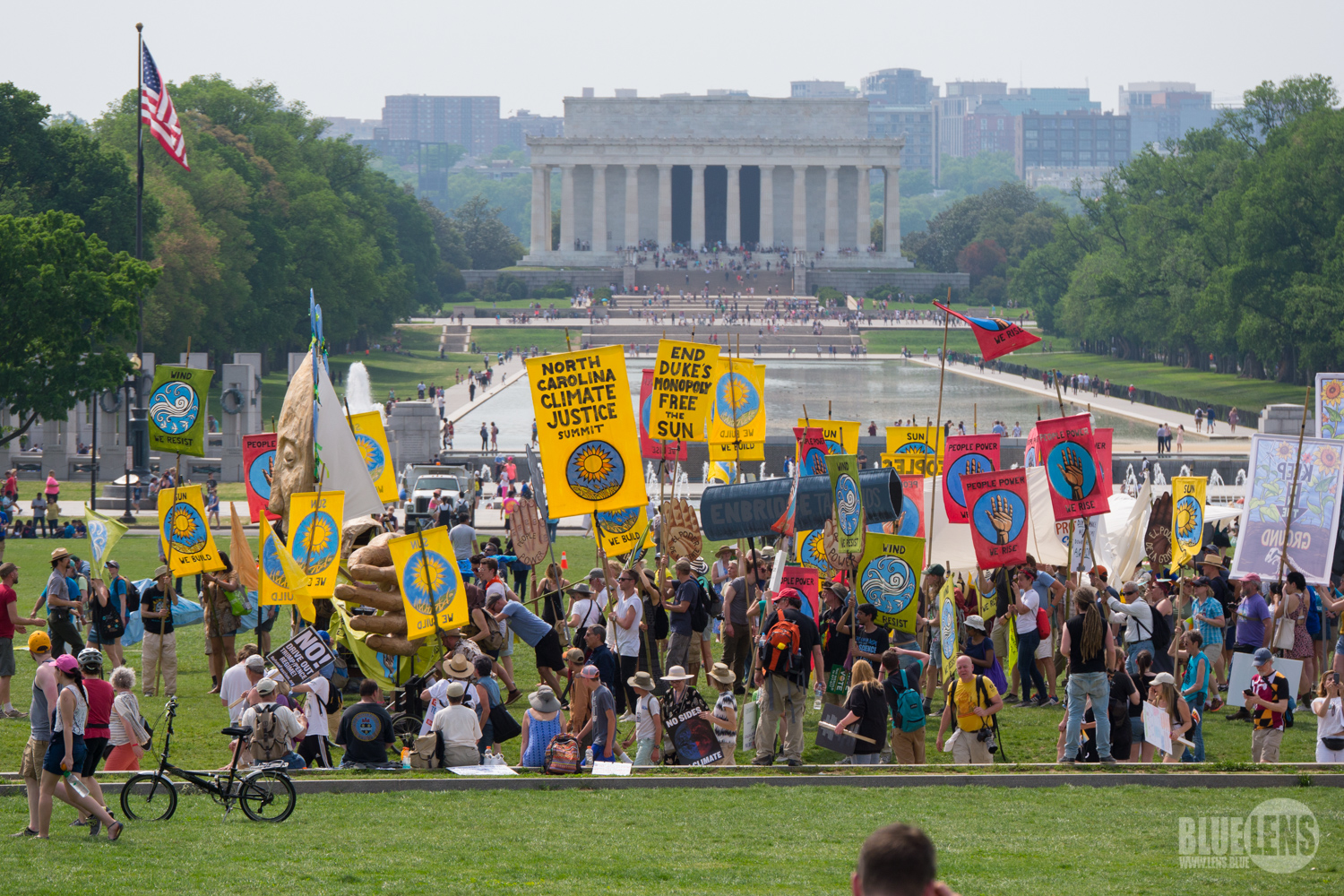
Demonstrators in Washington, DC

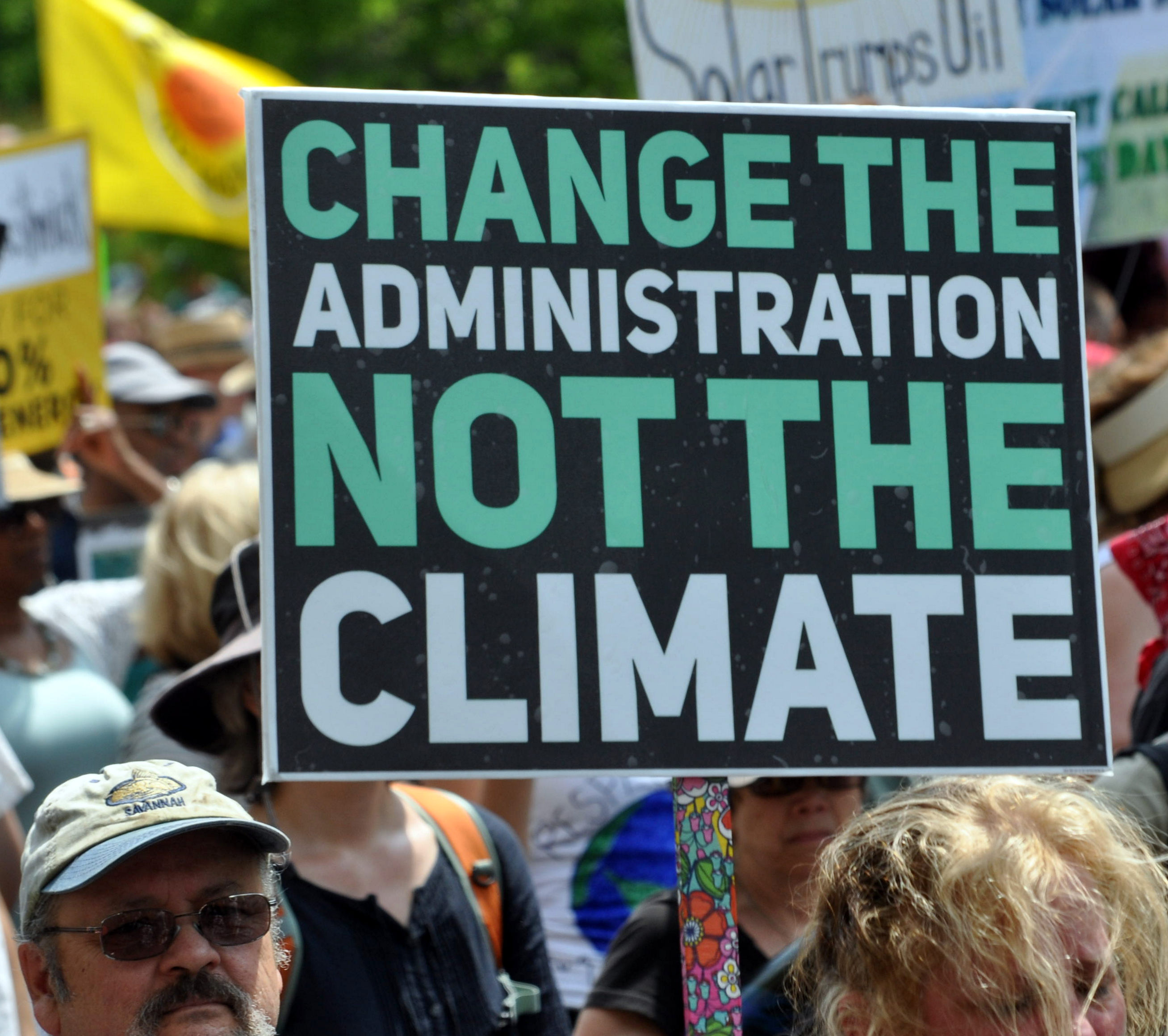
Demonstrators in Washington, DC

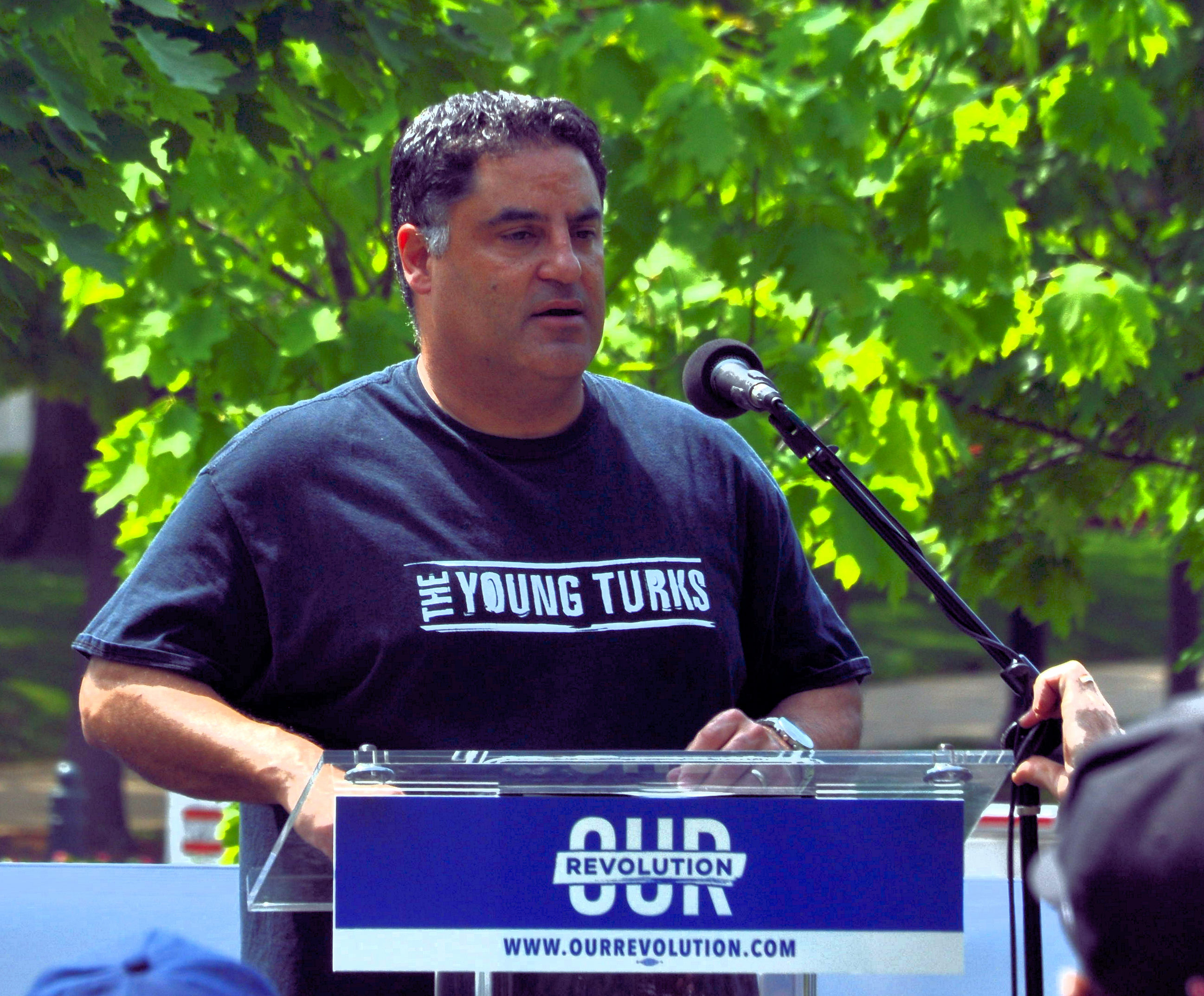
Cenk Uygur speaking at the march in Washington, DC

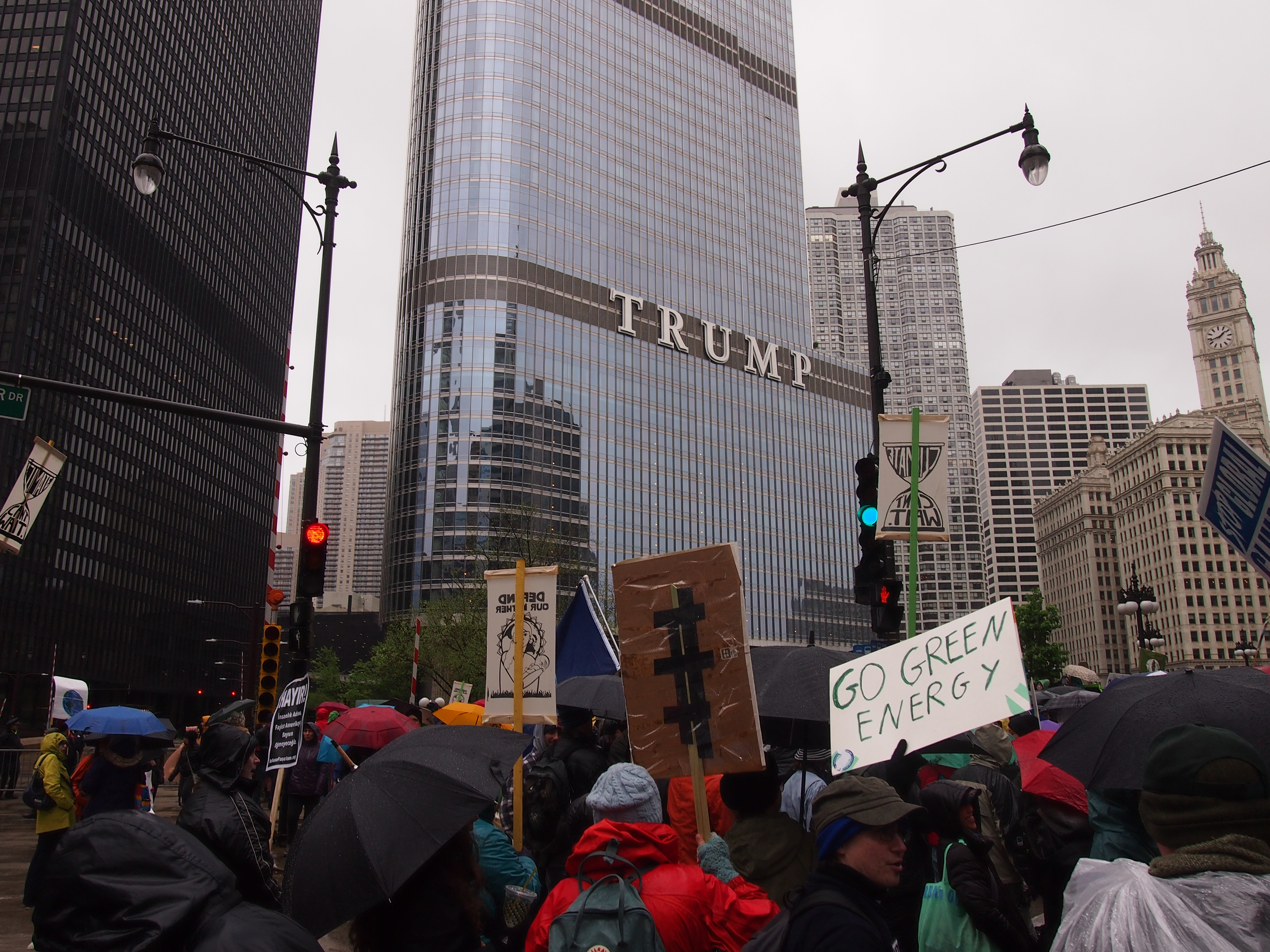
Demonstrators outside Chicago's Trump International Hotel and Tower

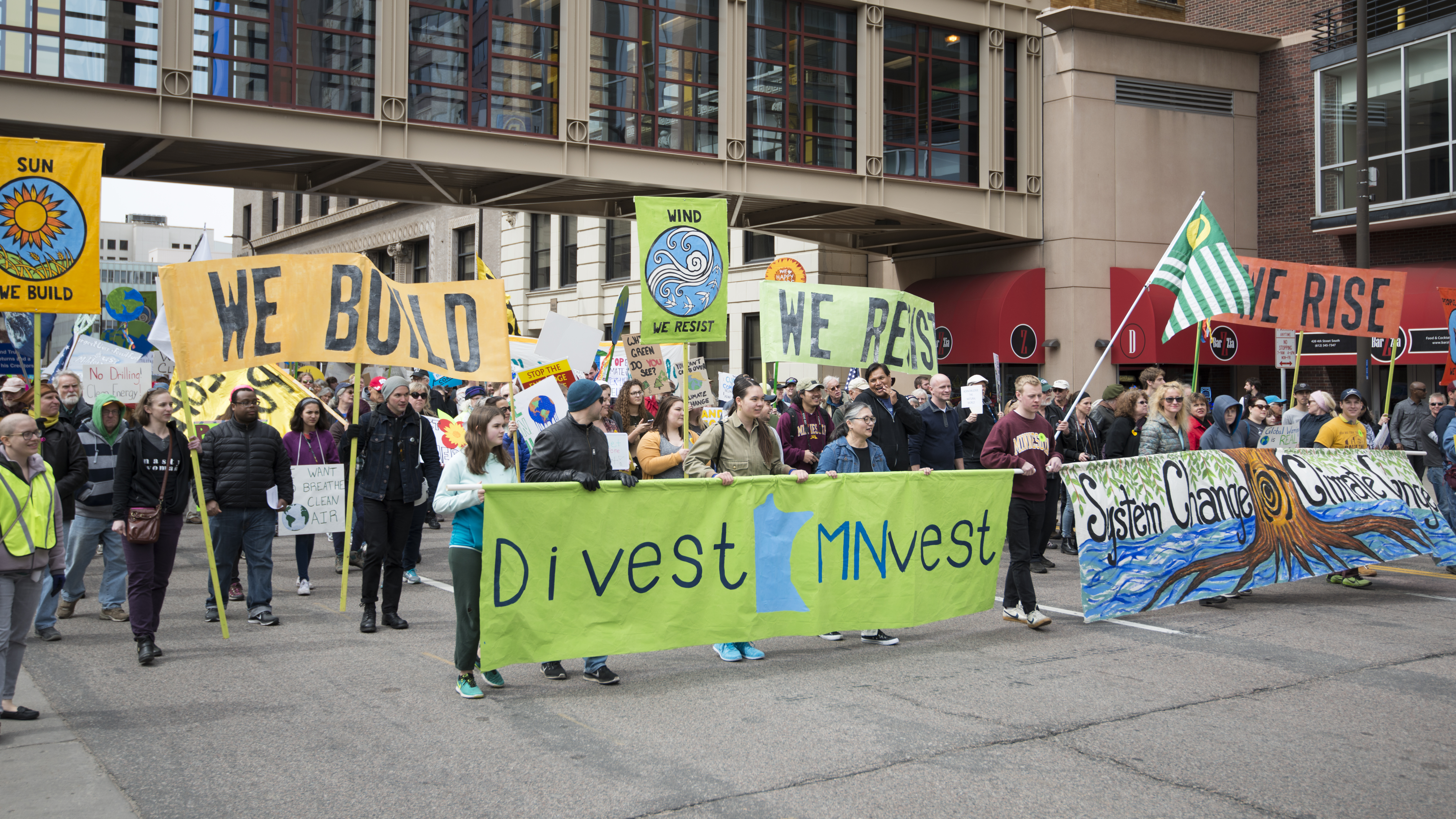
Demonstrators in Minneapolis

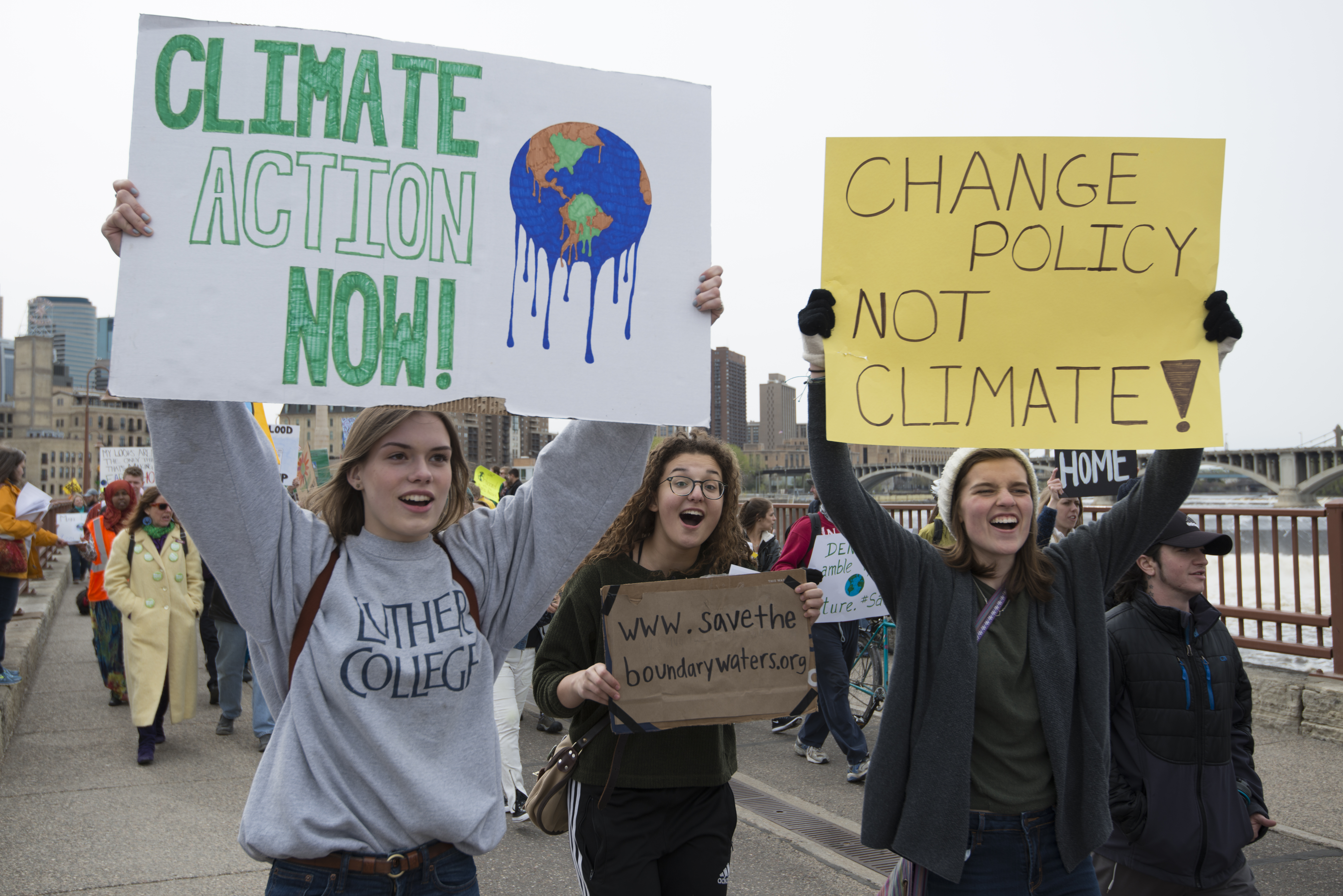
Demonstrators in Minneapolis

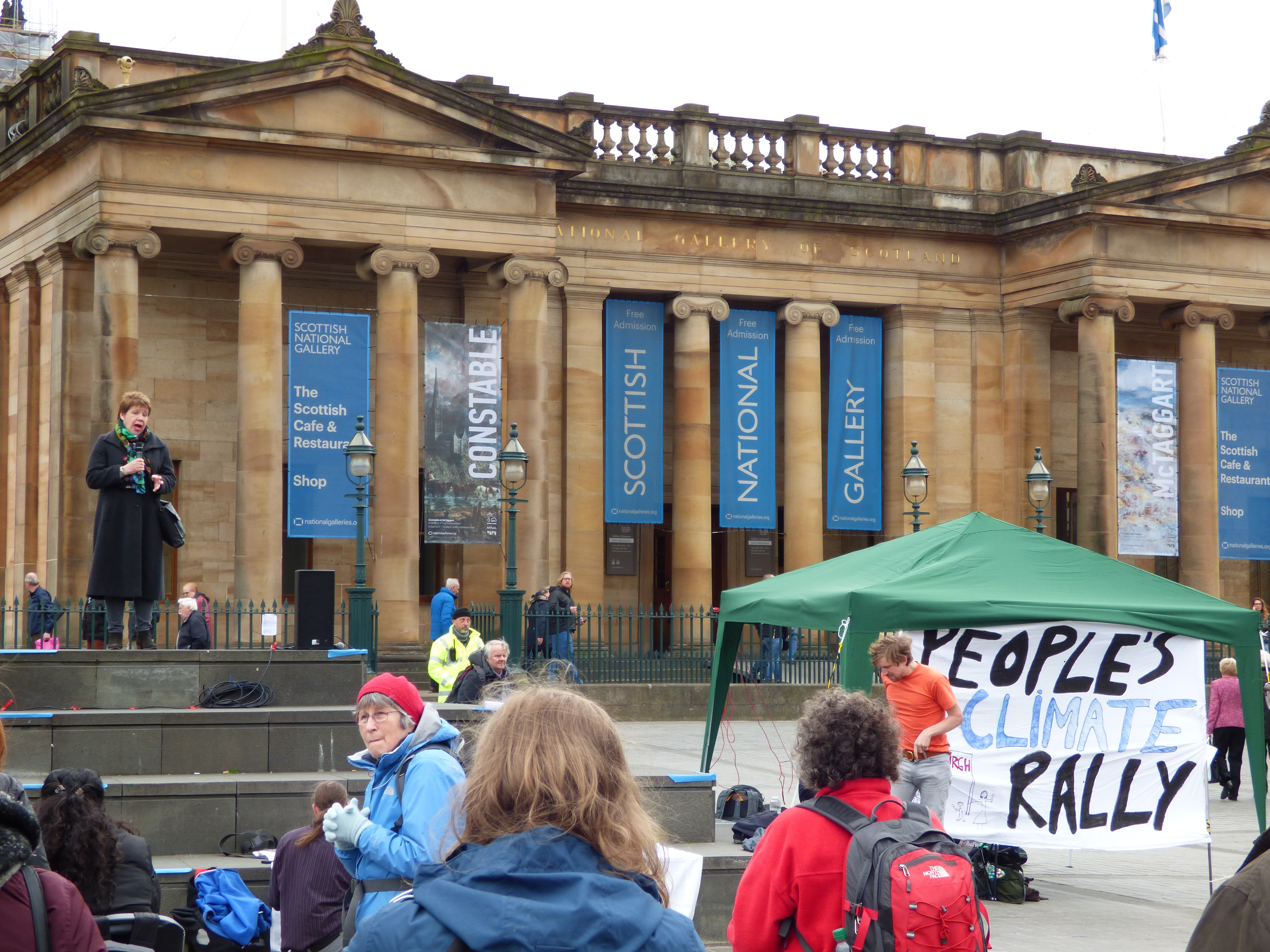
Lesley Hinds speaking at the march in Edinburgh

== See also ==
- Climate change in the United States
- Individual and political action on climate change
- List of environmental protests
- List of rallies and protest marches in Washington, D.C.
- Right-wing antiscience
