= National Council =

National Council may refer to:

== Conservation ==
- National Council for Science and the Environment, a US-based non-profit organization which has a mission to improve the scientific basis for environmental decision-making
- National Council for the Conservation of Plants and Gardens, former name of Plant Heritage, a British registered charity

== Economics ==
- National Competitiveness Council, an independent policy advisory body in the Republic of Ireland
- National Council of Welfare, a Canadian citizens' body
- National Council on Economic Education, a nationwide non-profit organization that leads in promoting economic and financial literacy
- National Economic Development Council, a UK economic planning forum set up in 1962

== Education ==
- Kenya National Examinations Council, the national body responsible for overseeing national examination in Kenya
- National Assessment and Accreditation Council, an autonomous body funded by University Grants Commission of Government of India based in Bangalore
- National Council for Accreditation of Teacher Education, a council of educators created to ensure and raise the quality of preparation for their profession
- National Council of Educational Research and Training, Indian governmental organization for school textbooks
- National Council for the Social Studies, a US-based association devoted to supporting social studies education
- National Council for the Training of Journalists, an organisation that oversees the training of journalists for the newspaper industry in the UK
- National Council of Examiners for Engineering and Surveying, a national non-profit organization composed of engineering and land surveying licensing boards representing all U.S. states and territories
- National Council on Education for the Ceramic Arts, the most influential organization in the US promoting ceramics as an art form
- National Council on Educational Reform, a governmental organization in Japan
- National Council for Teacher Education, a governmental organization in India
- National Council on Teacher Quality, a Washington D.C.–based think tank that advocates for tougher teacher evaluations

== Politics ==
=== Political parties ===
- Assam Jatiya Parishad (lit. 'Assam National Council'), a political party in Assam, India
- Codava National Council, a political party in the Indian state of Karnataka
- Garo National Council, a political party in Meghalaya, India
- Iraqi National Dialogue Council, a Sunni Arab political party initially established as an umbrella organization of approximately 10 smaller Sunni parties to take part in the 2005 Iraqi Constitution drafting process
- National Council of Nigeria and the Cameroons, a Nigerian political party from 1944 to 1966
- National Council for the Defense of Democracy, a former ethnic Hutu rebel group that now functions as a political party in Burundi
- National Council for the Defense of Democracy – Forces for the Defense of Democracy, another former rebel group and current political party in Burundi
- National Council of Venezuelan Indians, a political party in Venezuela
- United African National Council, a party led by Abel Muzorewa

=== Legislative bodies ===
- Federal National Council, the legislature of the United Arab Emirates
- National Council, the second chamber of the National Assembly of Estonia from 1938 to 1940
- National Council (Austria), one of the two houses of the Austrian parliament
- National Council (Bhutan), the upper chamber of the parliament of the Kingdom of Bhutan
- National Council (Greece), short-lived legislative body convened by the National Liberation Front in Greece in May 1944
- Czech National Council
- National Council (East Timor), a deliberative body in United Nations Administered East Timor
- National Council (Monaco), the parliament of the Principality of Monaco
- National Council (Namibia), the upper chamber of the country's bicameral Parliament
- National Council (Nepal), a national legislature
- National Council of Provinces, the upper house of the Parliament of South Africa under the constitution which came into full effect in 1997
- National Council (Switzerland), the large Chamber of the parliament
- National Council (Slovakia), the parliament of Slovakia since 1 October 1992
- National Council of Turkmenistan, a defunct parliament of Turkmenistan
- Palestinian National Council, the parliament in exile of the Palestinian people
- Provisional National Defence Council, the Ghanaian government after the People's National Party's elected government was overthrown by Jerry Rawlings
- Sahrawi National Council, the legislature of the government in exile of the Sahrawi Arab Democratic Republic
- State National Council, a parliament-like political body formed in the late stages of the Second World War in the Soviet Union

=== Unification ===
- National Unification Advisory Council, a constitutional governmental organization to advise the President of South Korea on the formulation of Korean peaceful unification policy
- National Unification Council, a governmental body in the Republic of China on Taiwan whose aim is to promote unification with Mainland China

=== Racial reconciliation ===
- Chinese Canadian National Council, an organization whose purpose is to monitor racial discrimination against Chinese in Canada
- Métis National Council, a national representative of the Métis people in Canada
- National Council for Combating Discrimination, an agency of the Romanian government
- National Council on Canada-Arab Relations, a non-profit organization dedicated to building bridges of understanding and cooperation between Canada and the Arab world

=== Other uses in politics ===
- Estonian National Council, one of the oldest and largest Estonian central organisations in Sweden
- Jewish National Council, executive body of the Jewish community in Mandatory Palestine
- National Advisory Council (India) (NAC) of India, an advisory body set up, during the First and Second Manmohan Singh ministries to monitor the implementation of the United Progressive Alliance government's manifesto
- National Councils, local government institutions of the Polish People's Republic from 1952 to 1990
- National Council of Administration, a former executive body in Uruguay (1919–1933)
- National Council of La Raza, a non-profit, non-partisan political advocacy group in the US, now known as UnidosUS
- National Council of Resistance of Iran, an Iranian exile organisation
- National Council of the Union of Burma, a liberal resistance organisation in Myanmar
- National Council of Women's Organizations, an American non-profit political organization headed by Martha Burk
- National Council of American–Soviet Friendship, the successor organisation to the National Council on Soviet Relations
- National Electoral Council (Venezuela), the institution in charge of all electoral processes that take place in Venezuela
- National Operations Council, an emergency administrative body which attempted to restore law and order in Malaysia after the May 13 Incident in 1969
- National Peace Keeping Council, a Thai military junta that overthrew the civilian elected government of Chatichai Choonhavan in 1991
- National Council (Vichy Government)

== Religion ==
- National Council of Churches, a religious organization consisting of 35 Protestant, Anglican, Orthodox, African-American and historic Christian denominations in the US
- National Council of Churches in Australia, an ecumenical organisation bringing together a number of Australia's Christian churches in dialogue and practical cooperation
- National Council on Bible Curriculum in Public Schools, a nonprofit organization that promotes the use of its 300-page Bible curriculum in schools throughout the US

== Science ==
- National Science Council, the main governmental promotion and funding body for science research in Taiwan
- National Scientific and Technical Research Council, an Argentine government agency which directs and co-ordinates most of the scientific and technical research done in public universities and institutes

== Social aid ==
- National Council of Women of Australia, an Australian organization founded in 1931
- National Council on Alcoholism and Drug Dependence, an American organization
- National Council on Compensation Insurance, a U.S. insurance rating and data collection bureau specializing in workers compensation
- National Council on Disability, an advisory board within the Department of Education
- National Council on Problem Gambling (Singapore), a council set up in Singapore on 31 August 2005 to address problem gambling
- National Temperance Council, a 1913 establishment

== Unionization ==
- National Council of Trade Unions, a national trade union center in South Africa
- National Council of Unions of the Industrial and Lower Income Group of Government Workers, a national trade union center in Malaysia

== Volunteering ==
- Boy Scouts of America National Council
- National Council for Voluntary Organisations, the umbrella body for the voluntary sector in England
- National Council of Jewish Women, a volunteer organization
- National Council of Negro Women, a voluntary non-profit membership organization with the mission to advance the opportunities and the quality of life for African American women, their families and communities

== Other ==
- Australian National Kennel Council, the peak body in Australia responsible for promoting excellence in breeding, showing, trialling, obedience, and other canine-related activities
- Greek National Council for Radio and Television, an independent supervisory and regulatory administrative authority of the radio and television market
- National Advertising Review Council, former name of Advertising Self-Regulatory Council, an organization based in New York US that provides self-regulatory services to the American advertising industry
- National Chicken Council, the non-profit trade association representing the U.S. chicken industry
- National Council (Slovenia), the constitutional representative of social, economic, professional and local interest groups
- National Council for the Maltese Language, an associate member of the European Federation of National Institutions for Language in the EU
- National Council for the Traditional Arts, a private, non-profit arts organization based in the US that promotes the traditional arts
- National Council of Architectural Registration Boards, the professional association of architectural registration boards of the various states in the US
- National Council on Radiation Protection and Measurements, a U.S. organization which seeks to formulate and widely disseminate information, guidance and recommendations on radiation protection
- National Crime Prevention Council, an American educational nonprofit organization whose mission is to enable people to create safer and more caring communities by addressing the causes of crime and violence
- National Fire Information Council, a US agency that encourages and perpetuates the use of a standardized national incident reporting system as a means of addressing the nation's fire problem and related emergency services issues
- National Foreign Trade Council, a US-based business lobby group for free trade and multinational corporations
- National House Building Council, the National House Builders Registration Council in the UK
- National Intelligence Council (Japan), council of the Japanese government on intelligence affairs
- National Intelligence Council (United States), the center for midterm and long-term strategic thinking within the United States Intelligence Community
- National Multicultural Greek Council, an umbrella council for thirteen Multicultural Greek Letter Organizations established in 1998
- National Pan-Hellenic Council, an umbrella organization for nine historically-black, international Greek letter fraternities and sororities
- National Peace Council (United Kingdom), the co-ordinating body for almost 200 groups across Britain
- National Safety Council, a not-for-profit safety organization chartered by the US government in 1913
- Singapore National Olympic Council, a registered society
- National Council Against Health Fraud, a US-based organization

== See also ==
- Armenian National Council
- National Arts Council (disambiguation)
- National Council of Government (disambiguation)
- National Council of Teachers (disambiguation)
- National Council of Women (disambiguation)
- National Economic Council (disambiguation)
- National Research Council (disambiguation)
- National security council
- National Youth Council (disambiguation)
