= National Research Centre =

National Research Centre can refer to:

== Agriculture and animals ==
- National Research Centre for Citrus, a research institute in India
- National Research Centre on Camels, Bikaner, a research institute in India
- National Research Centre on Equines, a research institute in India
- National Research Centre on Mithun, a research institute in India
- National Research Centre on Plant Biotechnology, Hisar, a research institute in India

== Multidisciplinary ==
- National Research Centre (Egypt), a research facility in Egypt
- National Research Centre for Growth and Development, a government-funded institute in New Zealand
- National Research Center for Physical Sciences Demokritos, a research centre in Greece

== Other ==
- Housing and Building National Research Center, Egyptian agency affiliated with the Ministry of Housing
- National Research Center for Women & Families, an American research center now known as the National Center for Health Research
- National Research Centre "Kurchatov Institute", a nuclear energy research facility in Russia
- Sequoyah National Research Center, an American repository for Native American publications

== See also ==
- National Centre for Research (disambiguation)
- NRC (disambiguation)
- National Research Council (disambiguation)
