= People's Climate Movement =

US Climate Change organization

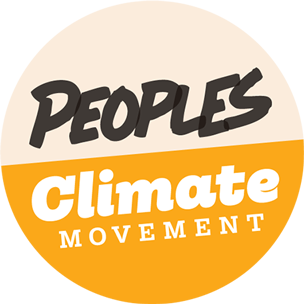
- Founded: 2014
- Dissolved: 2020
- Ideology: Climate movement Social justice
- Political position: Center-left

Website
- https://peoplesclimate.org/

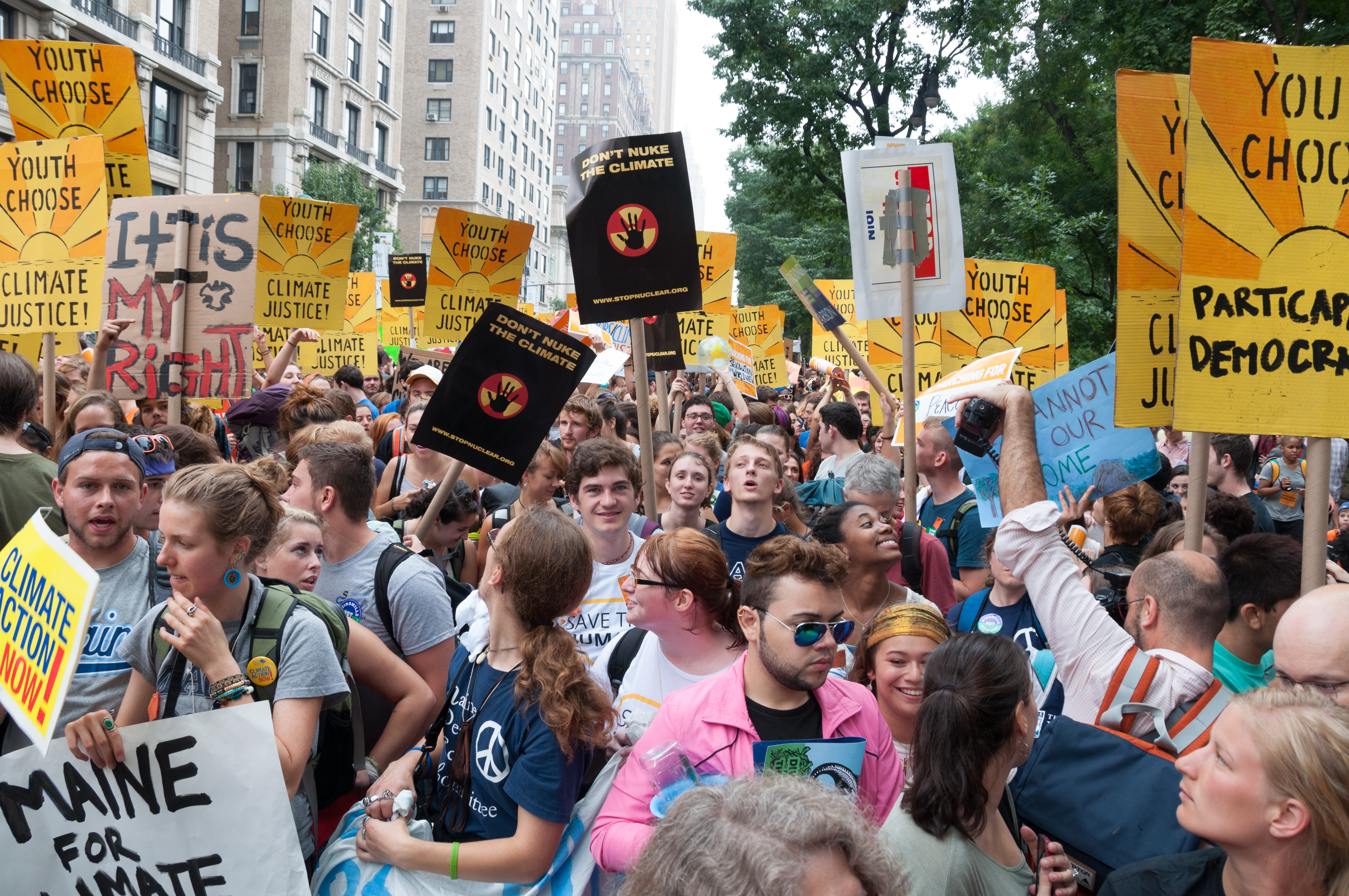
September 2014 People's Climate March

The People's Climate Movement (PCM) was a climate change activist coalition in the United States. PCM organized the 2014 People's Climate March and 2017 People's Climate March.

PCM included trade unions, social justice groups, and civil society, environmental, and religious organizations. PCM emphasized the inclusion of underrepresented groups, job creation and economic prosperity.

In 2020, PCM suspended organizing events or updating their social media, citing the COVID-19 pandemic.

== History ==
PCM started in 2014 to organize the People's Climate March in New York and the National Day of Action in 2015. PCM attendees or supporters included the Sierra Club, Sunrise Movement, Alliance for Climate Education, Clean Water Action, Service Employees International Union, and Union of Concerned Scientists, among others.

PCM organized the 2014 People's Climate March, 2015 National Day of Action, 2017 People's Climate March, 2017 "100 Days Mobilization", and 2018 "Rise for Climate, Jobs and Justice March". The 2018 march in San Francisco had over 30,000 participants, while organizing several more events throughout the United States.

== Ideology ==
PCM's platform included the following demands: A "100% Clean and Renewable Future", "Economic Opportunity for Everyone", "Prioritizing a Just Resilience, Relief and Recovery", "Union Wages that Support a Family", "Pollution-Free Communities and Workplaces", and "Protection of Workers".

PCM march organizers relied heavily on 2 approaches: "mass mobilization" and "movement alignment". Mass mobilization is the ability to motivate large crowds to converge upon one location with one goal as a unified force. This indicates the importance of the movement and serves as a visual for media coverage of the movement. Social media can enable movements to share information or organize a specific event. Movement alignment can increase one's impact by unifying other groups or social movements that are formally unaffiliated but working towards an identical or similar goal. Movement alignment differs from mass mobilization as it refers to a technique used to unify movements and organizations rather than individuals.

== Criticism ==
PCM was criticized by ecosocialists as symbolic and too friendly to corporations. Chris Hedges argued that real change could come only from "those willing to breach police barricades". The People's Climate Marches were criticized as merely symbolic, with no real plan to address the issues contributing to climate change.

== See also ==
- Sunrise Movement
- Sierra Club
- Democratic Socialists of America
