= History of education in Japan =

The history of education in Japan dates back at least to the sixth century, when Chinese learning was introduced at the Yamato court. Foreign civilizations have often provided new ideas for the development of Japan's own culture.

== 6th to 15th century ==
Chinese teachings and ideas flowed into Japan from the sixth to the ninth century. Along with the introduction of Buddhism came the Chinese system of writing and its literary tradition, and Confucianism.

By the ninth century, Heian-kyō (today's Kyoto), the imperial capital, had five institutions of higher learning, and during the remainder of the Heian period, other schools were established by the nobility and the imperial court. During the medieval period (1185–1600), Zen Buddhist monasteries were especially important centers of learning, and the Ashikaga School, Ashikaga Gakkō, flourished in the fifteenth century as a center of higher learning.

== 16th century ==
In the sixteenth century Japan experienced intense contact with the major European powers. Jesuit missionaries, who accompanied Portuguese traders, preached Christianity and opened a number of religious schools. Japanese students thus began to study Latin and Western classical music, as well as their own language.

see: Nanban trade period

== Edo period ==
Japan was very unified by the Tokugawa regime (1600–1867); and the Neo-Confucian academy, the Yushima Seidō in Edo was the chief educational institution of the state. Its administrative head was called Daigaku-no-kami as head of the Tokugawa training school for shogunate bureaucrats.

When the Tokugawa period began, few common people in Japan could read or write. By the period's end, learning had become widespread. Tokugawa education left a valuable legacy: an increasingly literate populace, a meritocratic ideology, and an emphasis on discipline and competent performance. Under subsequent Meiji leadership, this foundation would facilitate Japan's rapid transition from feudal society country to a modernizing nation.

During the Tokugawa period, the role of many of the bushi, or samurai, changed from warrior to government bureaucrat, and as a consequence, their formal education and their literacy increased proportionally. Samurai curricula stressed morality and included both military and literary studies. Confucian classics were memorized, and reading and reciting them were common methods of study. Arithmetic and calligraphy were also studied. Most samurai attended schools sponsored by their han (domains), and by the time of the Meiji Restoration of 1868, more than 200 of the 276 han had established schools. Some samurai and even commoners also attended private academies, which often specialized in particular Japanese subjects or in Western medicine, modern military science, gunnery, or Rangaku (Dutch studies), as European studies were called.

Education of commoners was generally practically oriented, providing basic training in reading, writing, and arithmetic, emphasizing calligraphy and use of the abacus. Much of this education was conducted in so-called temple schools (terakoya), derived from earlier Buddhist schools. These schools were no longer religious institutions, nor were they, by 1867, predominantly located in temples. By the end of the Tokugawa period, there were more than 11,000 such schools, attended by 750,000 students. Teaching techniques included reading from various textbooks, memorizing, abacus, and repeatedly copying Chinese characters and Japanese script.

Public education was provided for the samurai; ordinary people taught the rudiments to their own children or joined to hire a young teacher. By the 1860s, 40–50% of Japanese boys, and 15% of the girls, had some schooling outside the home. These rates were comparable to major European nations at the time (apart from Germany, which had compulsory schooling).

In 1858 Fukuzawa Yukichi founded a private school of Western studies which then became Keio University, known as a leading institute in Japanese higher education.

The educational infrastructure created by the state in the 7th–8th centuries underwent significant changes in its forms (state schools for officials, home education, schools at Buddhist temples, private schools, etc.). However, one thing remained unchanged: the prestige of the written word and its everyday functioning as a carrier of information necessary for the existence of society and culture. Even the first Christian missionaries who visited Japan in the 16th–17th centuries noted the extraordinary thirst for learning among the Japanese. Indeed, a huge number of written documents have survived from that time, including numerous agricultural treatises and diaries written by simple peasants. "Even though Latin is so unfamiliar to them... they are by nature so capable, skilled, teachable and diligent that it is surprising that even children sit in their seats for three or four hours in class without moving, just as if they were adults..." (missionary Alessandro Valignano, late 16th century). The fact that Japan had a fairly literate population during the Tokugawa era is confirmed by the fact that the country experienced a "book explosion" at that time. The poetry of Matsuo Basho, the dramas of Chikamatsu Monzaemon, and the prose of Ihara Saikaku marked the beginning of a new type of literature and occupied a special place in the cultural heritage of Japan. At the same time, a kind of guidebooks to the country appeared. Asai Ryoi's guide "Tokaido meiseoki" ("Notes on the Sights of the Tokaido Highway") was especially popular; it was even used as a teaching aid. The book boom had a great impact on the spread of education in the country, which in turn contributed to the increase in demand for all types of book products. Many specialized bookstores appeared, where a book could be borrowed for a quarter or a third of its price, as well as libraries "kashihonya", where a book could be borrowed for a while on a cash deposit. By the beginning of the 18th century, there were 656 such libraries in the city of Edo, where those who wanted to could get acquainted with new books if they did not have the opportunity to buy them. Since the Edo period saw rapid growth of the urban population, with Edo estimated to have a population of over one million by the early 18th century, making it the largest city in the world, and the literacy rate was so high that many commoners could read books, books were published in a wide variety of genres, including entertainment, such as cookery, gardening, travel guides, art books, bunraku (puppet theater) scripts, kibyoshi (satirical novels), sarebon (urban culture books), kokkeibon (humor books), ninjobon (romance novels), yomihon, and Kusazōshi. There were 600 to 800 rental bookstores in Edo, and people would rent or buy woodblock print books. The best-selling books during this period were Ihara Saikaku's Koshoku Ichidai Otoko (Life of a Man in Love), Kyokutei Bakini's Satomi and the Eight Dogs, and Jippensha Ikku's Walking the Tokaido Highway, and these books were reprinted many times. Education in the Tokugawa period was quite adequate to the needs of Japanese society at that time. The experience accumulated in this area at that time was used in the subsequent period. The decisive turn in the field of education in the Meiji period would not have been possible without the development of the school system in the bakumatsu period. The country had a large number of teachers with work experience, education was really accessible not only to the upper classes, but also to commoners. As a result, in 1870 the literacy rate in Japan was higher than in Europe, which served as a good basis for the successful industrialization of the country. In the first half of the 19th century, the literacy rate of the Japanese was one of the highest in the world at that time (40% among men and 15% among women), and a significant percentage of them were peasants. According to one estimate, by 1800 almost 100% of samurai and about 50-60% of chōnin (artisans and merchants) and nomin (peasants) were literate. Information processes were carried out in Japan with a high degree of intensity even before the arrival of Europeans. The high social status of knowledge was one of the key factors in the extremely rapid introduction of the Japanese to the achievements of the West. Many technical innovations in agriculture, which began to be systematically applied by peasants, led to the emergence of intensive farming. The level of agronomic knowledge is evidenced by the appearance of books on farming (nōsho) in the 17th century, which summarized previous experience and took into account local natural conditions. This indirectly indicated that the peasants were literate, otherwise it was impossible to become familiar with agronomic knowledge, to pass on accumulated experience from generation to generation. There were no books of this kind in Europe at that time. The widespread development of the school education system created a significant literate population in Japan, which subsequently had great significance for the successful implementation of the process of modernization of the country after the Meiji Restoration.

== Meiji period ==
After 1868 new leadership set Japan on a rapid course of modernization. The Meiji leaders established a public education system to help Japan catch up with the West and form a modern nation. Missions like the Iwakura mission were sent abroad to study the education systems of leading Western countries. They returned with the ideas of decentralization, local school boards, and teacher autonomy. Such ideas and ambitious initial plans, however, proved very difficult to carry out. After some trial and error, a new national education system emerged. As an indication of its success, elementary school enrollments climbed from about 30% percent of the school-age population in the 1870s to more than 90 percent by 1900, despite strong public protest, especially against school fees.

A modern concept of childhood emerged in Japan after 1850 as part of its engagement with the West. Meiji era leaders decided the nation-state had the primary role in mobilizing individuals—and children—in service of the state. The Western-style school was introduced as the agent to reach that goal. By the 1890s, schools were generating new sensibilities regarding childhood. After 1890 Japan had numerous reformers, child experts, magazine editors, and well-educated mothers who bought into the new sensibility. They taught the upper middle class a model of childhood that included children having their own space where they read children's books, played with educational toys and, especially, devoted enormous time to school homework. These ideas rapidly disseminated through all social classes

After 1870 school textbooks based on Confucian ethics were replaced by westernized texts. However, by the 1890s, after earlier intensive preoccupation with Western, particularly American educational ideas, a more authoritarian approach was imposed. Traditional Confucian and Shinto precepts were again stressed, especially those concerning the hierarchical nature of human relations, service to the new state, the pursuit of learning, and morality. These ideals, embodied in the 1890 Imperial Rescript on Education, along with highly centralized government control over education, largely guided Japanese education until 1945, when they were massively repudiated.

=== Women's Education ===
The education for women in the Meiji-period was heavily influenced by the essay "Creating Good Mothers", written by Nakamura Masanao. He argued that to create a stronger Japan, women should represent the religious as well as moral foundations in the households, acting as educators of their children and better halves of their husbands. He was also famous for coining the phrase “Good Wife; Wise Mother” (良妻賢母, ryōsai kenbo), saying that this ideal suits the affectionate character of Japanese women who are able to raise a new generation of Japanese who can defend the country. Furthermore, he argued that men could deliver desired results only if women could fulfill their role as good wives who follow a well-defined code of behavior.

Starting 1872 the Gakusei law was passed on education and it was possible for women to have official teaching positions and many taught in schools exclusively for girls (女学校, jogakkō).

== 1912–1945 ==
In the early 20th century, education at the primary level was egalitarian and virtually universal, but at higher levels it was multitracked, highly selective, and elitist. College education was largely limited to the few imperial universities, where German influences were strong. Three of the imperial universities admitted women, and there were a number of women's colleges, some quite prestigious, but women had relatively few opportunities to enter higher education. During this period, a number of universities were founded by Christian missionaries, who also took an active role in expanding educational opportunities for women, particularly at the secondary level.

After 1919 several of the private universities received official status and were granted government recognition for programs they had conducted, in many cases, since the 1880s. In the 1920s, the tradition of liberal education briefly reappeared, particularly at the kindergarten level, where the Montessori method attracted a following. In the 1930s, education was subject to strong military and nationalistic influences, under Sadao Araki.

== Occupation period ==
By 1945 the Japanese education system had been devastated, and with the defeat came the discredit of much prewar thought. A new wave of foreign ideas was introduced during the postwar period of military occupation.

Occupation policy makers and the United States Education Mission, set up in 1946, made a number of changes aimed at democratizing Japanese education: instituting the six-three-three grade structure (six years of elementary school, three of lower-secondary school, and three of upper-secondary school) and extending compulsory schooling to nine years. They replaced the prewar system of higher-secondary schools with comprehensive upper-secondary schools (high schools). Curricula and textbooks were revised, the nationalistic morals course was abolished and replaced with social studies, locally elected school boards were introduced, and teachers unions established.

With the abolition of the elitist higher education system and an increase in the number of higher education institutions, the opportunities for higher learning grew. Expansion was accomplished initially by granting university or junior college status to a number of technical institutes, normal schools, and advanced secondary schools.

== Post-occupation period ==
After the restoration of full national sovereignty in 1952, Japan immediately began to modify some of the changes in education, to reflect Japanese ideas about education and educational administration. The postwar Ministry of Education regained a great deal of power. School boards were appointed, instead of elected. A course in moral education was reinstituted in modified form, despite substantial initial concern that it would lead to a renewal of heightened nationalism. The post-occupation period also witnessed a significant widening of educational opportunities. From 1945 to 1975, the ratio of junior high school graduates who went on to high school rose considerably, from 42.5% in 1950 to 91.9% in 1975.

By the 1960s, postwar recovery and accelerating economic growth brought new demands to expand higher education. But as the expectations grew that the quality of higher education would improve, the costs of higher education also increased. In general, the 1960s was a time of great turbulence in higher education. Late in the decade especially, universities in Japan were rocked by violent student riots that disrupted many campuses. Campus unrest was the confluence of a number of factors, including the anti-Vietnam War movement in Japan, ideological differences between various Japanese student groups, disputes over campus issues, such as discipline; student strikes, and even general dissatisfaction with the university system itself.

The government responded with the University Control Law in 1969 and, in the early 1970s, with further education reforms. New laws governed the founding of new universities and teachers' compensation, and public school curricula were revised. Private education institutions began to receive public aid, and a nationwide standardized university entrance examination was added for the national universities. Also during this period, strong disagreement developed between the government and teachers groups.

Despite the numerous educational changes that have occurred in Japan since 1868, and especially since 1945, the education system still reflects long-standing cultural and philosophical ideas: that learning and education are esteemed and to be pursued seriously, and that moral and character development are integral to education. The meritocratic legacy of the Meiji period has endured, as has the centralized education structure. Interest remains in adapting foreign ideas and methods to Japanese traditions and in improving the system generally.

== 1980s ==
In spite of the admirable success of the education system since World War II, problems remained through the 1980s. Some of these difficulties as perceived by domestic and foreign observers included rigidity, excessive uniformity, lack of choices, undesirable influences of the university examinations (入学試験, nyūgaku shiken), and overriding emphasis on formal educational credentials. There was also a belief that education was responsible for some social problems and for the general academic, behavioral, and adjustment problems of some students. There was great concern too that Japanese education be responsive to the new requirements caused by international challenges of the changing world in the twenty-first century.

Flexibility, creativity, internationalization (国際化, kokusaika), individuality, and diversity thus became the watchwords of Japan's momentous education reform movement of the 1980s, although they echoed themes heard earlier, particularly in the 1970s. The proposals and potential changes of the 1980s were so significant that some compared them to the educational changes that occurred when Japan opened to the West in the nineteenth century and to those of the occupation.

Concerns of the new reform movement were captured in a series of reports issued between 1985 and 1987 by the National Council on Educational Reform, set up by Prime Minister Yasuhiro Nakasone. The final report outlined basic emphases in response to the internationalization of education, new information technologies, and the media and emphases on individuality, lifelong learning, and adjustment to social change. To explore these new directions, the council suggested that eight specific subjects be considered: designing education for the twenty-first century; organizing a system of lifelong learning and reducing the emphasis on the educational background of individuals; improving and diversifying higher education; enriching and diversifying elementary and secondary education; improving the quality of teachers; adapting to internationalization; adapting to the information age; and conducting a review of the administration and finance of education. These subjects reflected both educational and social aspects of the reform, in keeping with the Japanese view about the relationship of education to society. Even as debate over reform took place, the government quickly moved to begin implementing changes in most of these eight areas. These reforms have been on-going, and although most have now forgotten about the work done by the reform council in the 1980s, the contents of many changes can be traced back to this time.

== History of women's education ==
Education for females, often bound by constraints, had become an issue as far back as in the Heian period over a thousand years ago. But the Sengoku period finally made it clear that women had to be educated to defend the country when their husbands died. The Tale of Genji was written by a well-educated female from the Heian period and writings by women blossomed throughout Japanese history. However, Chika Kuroda was the first female Bachelor of Science, graduating in 1916 from Tohoku Imperial University.

== See also ==
- Rangaku
- Han school (schools run by daimyōs)
- National Seven Universities
- Imperial Rescript on Education
- Foreign government advisors in Meiji Japan
- Japanese history textbook controversies
  - Shotouka-Chiri
