= National Arts Council =

National Arts Council is the name of a number of national bodies which oversee government funding of the arts.

- Australia Council for the Arts
- National Culture Fund of Bulgaria
- Canada Council
- Cayman National Cultural Foundation
- Arts Council England
- Arts Council of Finland
- Arts Council of Great Britain
- Arts Council of Ireland
- Creative New Zealand
- Pakistan National Council of the Arts
- National Commission for Culture and the Arts of the Philippines
- Scottish Arts Council
- National Arts Council (Singapore)
- National Arts Council of South Africa
- National Council for the Traditional Arts, United States
- National Council on Education for the Ceramic Arts, United States
- National Arts Council of Tanzania
- Arts Council of Wales
- National Arts Council of Zimbabwe

== See also ==
- Arts council
