= Terakoya =

Japanese Edo period educational institutions

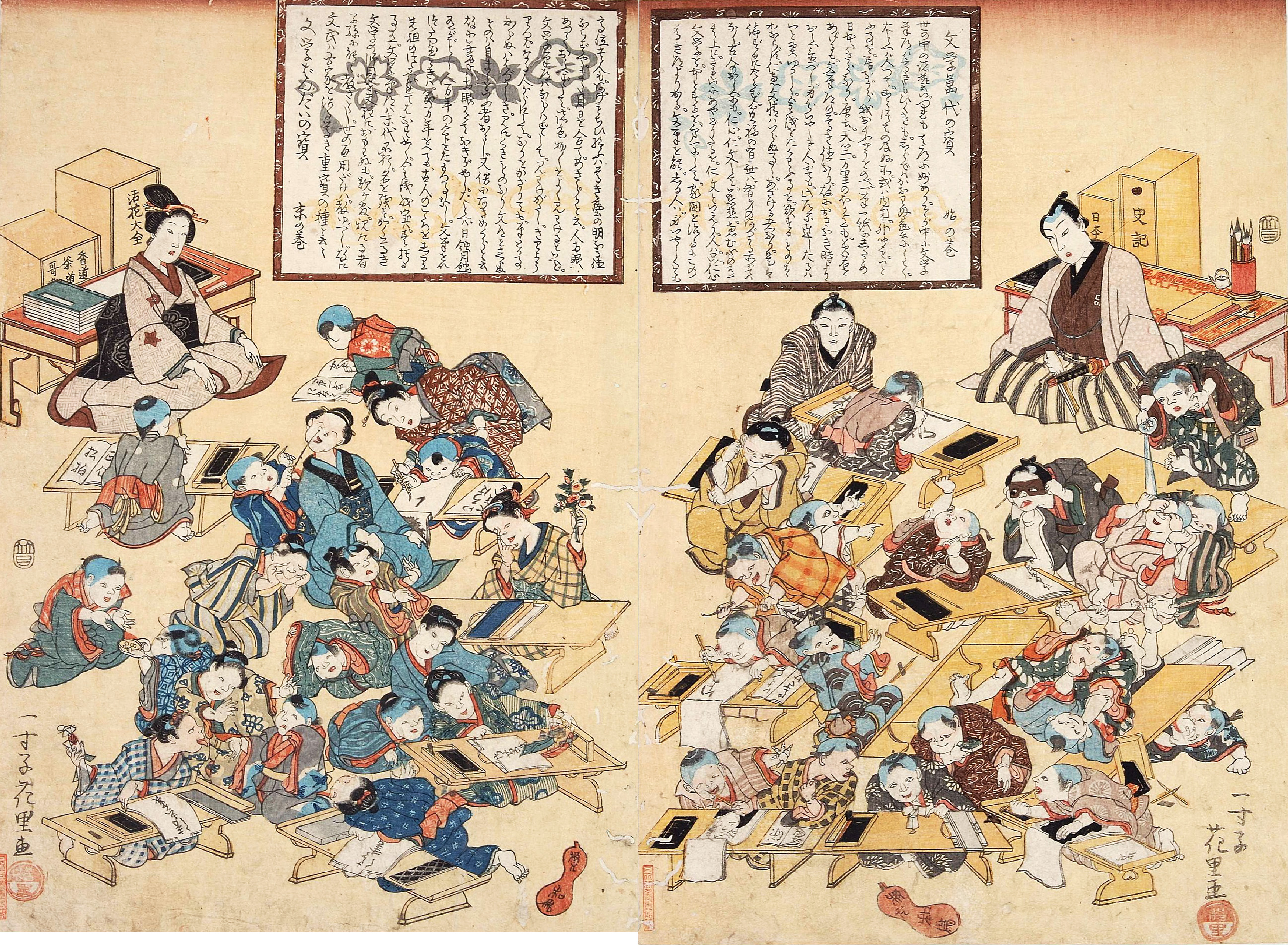
Terakoya school in the Edo period

Terakoya (寺子屋, terako-ya; lit. "temple schools, private elementary schools") were private educational institutions that taught reading and writing to the children of Japanese commoners during the Edo period.

== History ==
The first terakoya made their appearance at the beginning of the 17th century, as a development from educational facilities founded in Buddhist temples. Before the Edo period, public educational institutions were dedicated to the children of samurai and ruling families, thus the rise of the merchant class in the middle of the Edo period boosted the popularity of terakoya, as they were widely common in large cities as Edo and Osaka, as well as in rural and coastal regions.

The terakoya attendance rate reached 70% in the capital Edo at the end of the 18th century and the beginning of the 19th century. The terakoya were abolished in the Meiji period, when the government instituted the Education System Order (学制, Gakusei) in 1872, when attending public schools was made compulsory to give basic education to the whole population.

== Curriculum ==
Terakoya focused on reading and writing, but they dealt with extra subjects and disciplines, as counting with the abacus (soroban), history, and geography. They taught girls sewing, tea ceremony rituals, flower arranging techniques and other arts and crafts.

The classes usually took place in private homes of samurai, Buddhist priests, or even commoner citizens. The instructors, called shishō (師匠) or te-narai-shishō (手習い師匠) were mostly commoners, but samurai and Buddhist clergy also taught at terakoya. The administration tasks were often taken care of by the teachers themselves. A few terakoya were administered by Shinto priests and medical doctors.

Unlike centers of popular education that taught mainly skills needed in everyday life, terakoya offered a higher level of education. The curriculum began with calligraphy courses, as pupils imitated their instructor examples, the so-called tehon (手本). Once the basics of writing were mastered, the pupils advanced to textbooks known as ōrai-mono (往来物), which dated back to the Heian period and were mainly used for samurai education. These copybooks were compiled by Japanese men of letters and were written in kanji combined with kana. They contained useful information about the daily lives of people, as household precepts, conversation skills and moral values, as well as historical and geographical contents, which showed a wider scope of social life to the students.

Although only a handful of terakoya offered commercial courses for the children of the merchant class, calculating with the abacus became more and more popular at the end of the Edo period.

Through the system of terakoya and han schools, the Japanese population had achieved a high degree of literacy at the end of the Edo period.

== Contemporary ==
Today, there have been instances of organisations and events bearing the name of terakoya in modern Japan, such as the Nichiren-affiliated Hosei-ji temple in Tokyo which held a two-day terakoya gathering in which elementary schoolers engaged in religious practices such as the copying of Buddhist images (写仏 shabutsu) and disciplined study of sutras while seated in the seiza style, in addition to many recreational activities. In Honjō, Saitama, the Honjō Terakoya organisation brings together volunteers, young students, and Buddhist clerics to provide both exposure to spiritual practices, such as the aforementioned shabutsu and zazen, but also personal and social development for the youths.

The Terakoya Network promotes the creation of modern-day terakoya and have thus far helped to establish more than 40 such institutions around the entire country. These terakoya involve cooperation between university student volunteers, local business leaders, religious figures, and humanities professionals with a heavy emphasis on community and regional engagement in addition to personal and interpersonal development.

== See also ==
- Education in Japan
- History of education in Japan
