= National Centre for Research =

National Centre for Research can refer to:

== Government ==
- French National Centre for Scientific Research, state research centre in France
- National Centre for Polar and Ocean Research, an Indian research and development centre affiliated with the Ministry of Earth Sciences
- National Centre for Research (Sudan), Sudanese research institute under the Ministry of Higher Education and Scientific Research
- National Centre for Research and Development, Polish government agency
- National Center for Research Resources, former center within the US National Institutes of Health
- National Center for Toxicological Research, branch of the Food and Drug Administration (FDA) in the United States

== University centres ==
- National Center for Research, a doctoral management course at the College of Defence Management
- National Center for Research in Economic Education, American research center affiliated with the University of Nebraska–Lincoln
- National Centre for Research on Europe, centre at the University of Canterbury in New Zealand
- National Center for Research on Evaluation, Standards, and Student Testing (CRESST), research center at University of California, Los Angeles

== Other ==
- National Center for Atmospheric Research, an American research center
- National Center for Research in Advanced Information and Digital Technologies, American education research center
- National Center for Research on Earthquake Engineering, research centre in Taiwan
- National Centre for Social Research, British charity and research institute
- National Centre for Vocational Education Research, an Australian nonprofit

== See also ==
- National Research Centre (disambiguation)
- NCR (disambiguation)
- National Research Council (disambiguation)
