= National Council of Teachers =

National Council of Teachers may refer to:

- National Council of Teachers of English, an education organization
- National Council of Teachers of Mathematics, the world's largest organization concerned with mathematics education

== See also ==
- National Council for Teacher Education, a governmental organization in India
- National Council (disambiguation)
