= National Research Council =

National Research Council may refer to:

- National Research Council Canada, sponsoring research and development
- National Research Council (Italy), scientific and technological research organisation
- National Research Council (United States), part of the U.S. National Academy of Sciences and U.S. National Academy of Engineering
- National Scientific and Technical Research Council, Argentine government agency which directs scientific research in universities and institutes

== See also ==
- National Council of Educational Research and Training, India
- National Council (disambiguation)
- National Research Centre (disambiguation)
- National Research Council (disambiguation)
- National Centre for Research (disambiguation)
