= National Council of Women =

National Council of Women may refer to:

- National Council of Women of Australia
  - National Council of Women of Queensland
- National Council of Women of Canada
- National Council of Women (Chile)
- National Council of Women of Great Britain
- National Council of Women in India
- National Council of Women of Kenya
- National Council of Women of New Zealand
- National Council of Women of Thailand
- National Council of Women of the United States
- Solomon Islands National Council of Women

== See also ==
- Conseil national des femmes belges, Belgium
- Consiglio Nazionale delle Donne Italiane, Italy
- Dutch Women's Council
- International Council of Women
- National Council for Women, Egypt
- National Council of French Women
- National Council of Ghana Women
- National Council of Greek Women
- National Council of Jewish Women
- National Council of Negro Women, United States
- National Council of Swedish Women
- National Council of Women's Organizations, United States
- National Council of Women's Societies, Nigeria
- National Commission for Women (India)
- National Organization for Women, United States
