= Emerald Cities Collaborative =

US non-profit organization

- Founded: 2009
- Type: Non-governmental organization
- Purpose: Green Building, Social Justice
- Location: Washington, DC, United States
- Region served: United States
- Method: Job training, investment, advocacy
- Key people: Denise Fairchild, President and CEO
- Website: www.emeraldcities.org

Emerald Cities Collaborative (ECC) is a national non-profit organization based in Washington, D.C., with affiliate offices in Boston, Los Angeles, New York, Oakland, San Francisco and Seattle. Founded in 2009, Emerald Cities has the stated goal of creating "high-road" local economies that are sustainable, just and inclusive.

== Overview ==
The collaborative comprises more than 21 national organizations and focuses on retrofitting urban building stock, developing infrastructure, and promoting diverse local economies built around energy efficiency.

In 2022, Emerald Cities Collaborative, along with HR&A Advisors, Elevate, and the American Council for Energy-Efficient Economy (ACEEE), announced the launch of Residential Retrofits for Energy Equity (R2E2) program. The aim is to introduce energy-saving home retrofit strategies for communities throughout the United States that are often left out of climate investments.

== Services ==
Emerald Cities runs a number of programs oriented towards sustainability and energy efficiency, including the RENEW Multi-family Program, the Community College Initiative, and an online training program for small and minority contractors on energy efficiency and renewable energy retrofitting. The organization also engages in workforce development, providing labor-community partnerships, training programs, and career pipelines to pair qualified individuals with green jobs. These programs include the Architecture, Construction and Engineering Students (ACES) Pathway Program and Skills Build us, a construction apprenticeship assistance program and a contractor academy for minority businesses in Boston. Additionally, Emerald Cities advocates locally and nationally for policy supporting efficient infrastructure and contracting that includes minority-owned businesses.

== Chapters ==
The Emerald Cities Collaborative has chapters in the following cities:

- Boston
- Los Angeles
- New York City
- Oakland
- San Francisco
- Seattle

== Board ==
- Bronze Investments
- Building and Construction Trades Department, AFL-CIO
- On Wisconsin Strategy
- Community Action Partnership
- The Corps Network
- Council of Large Public Housing Authorities
- Enterprise Community Partners
- Green For All
- International Brotherhood of Electrical Workers
- International Union of Painters and Allied Trades
- Laborer International Union of North America
- The Local Initiatives Support Corporation
- MIT Community Innovators Lab
- NeighborWorks America
- Partnership For Working Families
- PolicyLink
- United Association of Plumbers and Pipefitters
- YouthBuild USA

== Affiliates ==
=== Donors ===
Donors to the Emerald Cities Collaborative include:

- Annie E. Casey Foundation
- Atlantic Philanthropies
- Nathan Cummings Foundation
- The Joyce Foundation
- The Kendeda Fund
- The Kresge Foundation
- Living Cities
- The Rockefeller Foundation
- Surdna Foundation

=== Partner organizations ===
- AFL-CIO Center for Green Jobs
- Building Futures
- C-Change Investments
- California Construction Academy
- Change to Win Federation
- Civic Ventures
- DC Project
- Detroiters Working for Environmental Justice
- KGS Buildings, LLC
- National Association for the Advancement of Colored People
- Pantheon Properties
- PA State Representative John Siptroth
- United Steelworkers
- US Green Building Council
- Wider Opportunities for Women
