= National Council of Women's Organizations =

American nonprofit umbrella organization

The National Council of Women's Organizations (NCWO) is an American non-profit umbrella organization of more than 100 women's organizations. The organization has a membership of more than 11 million women. In 2005, Susan Scanlan became the chair of NCWO. Shireen Mitchell is the founding chair of the Media and Technology taskforce.

== Member organizations ==
- American Association of University Women
- American Medical Women's Association
- American Nurses Association
- American Physical Therapy Association
- American Psychological Association
- American Women in Radio and Television
- Aquinas College Women's Studies Center
- Association for Women in Science
- Association of Reproductive Health Professionals
- CODEPINK: Women for Peace
- Catholics for Choice
- Choice USA
- Church Women United
- Claremont Graduate University, Applied Women's Studies
- Coalition of Labor Union Women
- Equal Rights Advocates
- Equality Now
- Feminist Majority Foundation
- Gender Public Advocacy Coalition
- Girls Incorporated
- Guttmacher Institute
- International Center for Research on Women
- League of Women Voters
- Legal Momentum
- Million Mom March with the Brady Campaign
- Ms. Foundation for Women
- NARAL
- National Abortion Federation
- National Association for Female Executives
- National Association of Women Business Owners
- National Coalition of Abortion Providers
- National Congress of Black Women
- National Council of Jewish Women
- National Council of Negro Women
- National Foundation for Women Legislators
- National Organization for Women
- National Osteoporosis Foundation
- National Women's Health Network
- National Women's History Museum
- National Women's History Project
- National Women's Law Center
- National Women's Political Caucus
- National Women's Conference
- National Women's Hall of Fame
- National Women's Health Resource Center
- Northern Illinois University Women's Studies Program
- Oregon State University Women's Studies Program
- Peace X Peace
- Planned Parenthood Federation of America, Inc.
- Religious Coalition for Reproductive Choice
- Running Start: Bring Young Women to Politics
- Sewall–Belmont House and Museum
- Society for Women's Health Research
- U.S. Women's Chamber of Commerce
- United American Nurses, AFL-CIO
- United Methodist Church, General Board of Church and Society
- United Methodist Church, Women's Division, General Board of Global Ministries
- Veteran Feminists of America
- Vital Voices Global Partnership
- Wider Opportunities for Women
- Women's Action for New Directions
- Women's International League for Peace and Freedom
- Women's Ordination Conference
- Women's Sports Foundation
- Women for Women International
- Women in Military Service for America Memorial
- YWCA USA
