= Christian Fellowship Congregational Church (UCC) =

Coordinates: 32.721034°N 117.074908°W

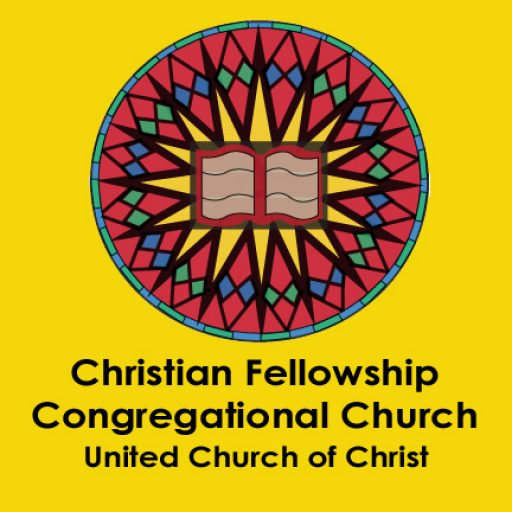
- Christian Fellowship Congregational Church (UCC)
- Location: 1601 Kelton Road, San Diego, California 92114
- Denomination: United Church of Christ
- Website: www.christianfellowshipucc.org

History
- Former name(s): Second Congregational Church, Logan Heights Congregational Church
- Founded: 1886

Christian Fellowship Congregational Church (Christian Fellowship UCC) is a United Church of Christ church located in southeast San Diego in the community of Emerald Hills. Since 1963 the church has been situated upon the former Emerald Hills Golf Course and Country Club. The congregation is a progressive, inclusive, bible-based Christian community of faith that seeks in every way to recontextualize Christianity through black liberation theology and praxis. The church hosts a weekly Sunday evening Jazz Vespers worship services which attracts a very diverse community; Jazz Vespers @ Christian Fellowship UCC.

== Brief history ==
The church was established in 1887 as the Second Congregational Church and later renamed in 1905 the Logan Heights Congregational Church upon locating to the Logan Heights community in the City of San Diego.

The Second Congregational Church, known as the Logan Heights Church, had its beginning on the second Sunday in November, 1887, when Rev. A. B. White, of Toledo, Ohio, began to preach in the schoolhouse on Twenty-seventh Street. On February 19, 1888, the church building at Twenty-sixth Street and Kearney Avenue was dedicated, Mr. Silcox preaching the sermon. The Land & Town Company gave the lots and the members of the First Congregational Church contributed liberally to the building fund.

In 1950 the church changed its name to Christian Fellowship Congregational Church, and in 1957 the congregation voted to unite with the newly formed United Church of Christ.

== Clergy serving from 1887 to present ==
- The Reverend A.B White (1887–1888)
- The Reverend F. B. Perkins (1888–1890)
- The Reverend George A Hall (1890–1895)
- The Reverend R. T. Earl (1895–1902)
- The Reverend J. L Pearson (1902–1905)
- The Reverend E. E. P. Abbot (1905–1908)
- The Reverend Stephen G. Emerson (1908–1914)
- The Reverend F. C. Reid (1914–1917)
- The Reverend W. H. Harmaford (1918–1920)
- The Reverend Arthur Metcalf (1921–1926)
- The Reverend C. H. Baldwin (1927)
- The Reverend J. Frederick Saunders (1927–1930)
- The Reverend J. Dayton Auxill (1932–1940)
- The Reverend Alvin G. Rowe (1941–1942)
- The Reverend Raymond E. Kinney (1943–1944)
- The Reverend E. Lowell Cantrell (1945–1946)
- The Reverend E. Major Shavers (1946–1963)
- The Reverend John Everett (interim pastor)
- The Reverend Adlai Mack (1978–1984)
- The Reverend Dr. James Hester Hargett (1986–1997, Pastor Emeritus)
- The Reverend Dr. Arthur L. Cribbs, Jr. (1999–2007)
- The Reverend Dr. Ameila Walker (interim pastor, 2008-09)
- The Reverend Virginia Brown (sabbatical pastor, 2018)
- The Reverend Dr. J. Lee Hill, Jr. (2010 – 2021)
