= National Council of Government =

National Council of Government may refer to:

- National Council of Government (Haiti) (French: Conseil National de Gouvernement), provisional ruling body in Haiti (1986-1988)
- National Council of Government (Uruguay) (Spanish: Consejo Nacional de Gobierno), former constitutional ruling body in Uruguay (1952-1967)

== See also ==
- National Council (disambiguation)
