= National Research Centre on Camels, Bikaner =

Research institute in Rajasthan, India

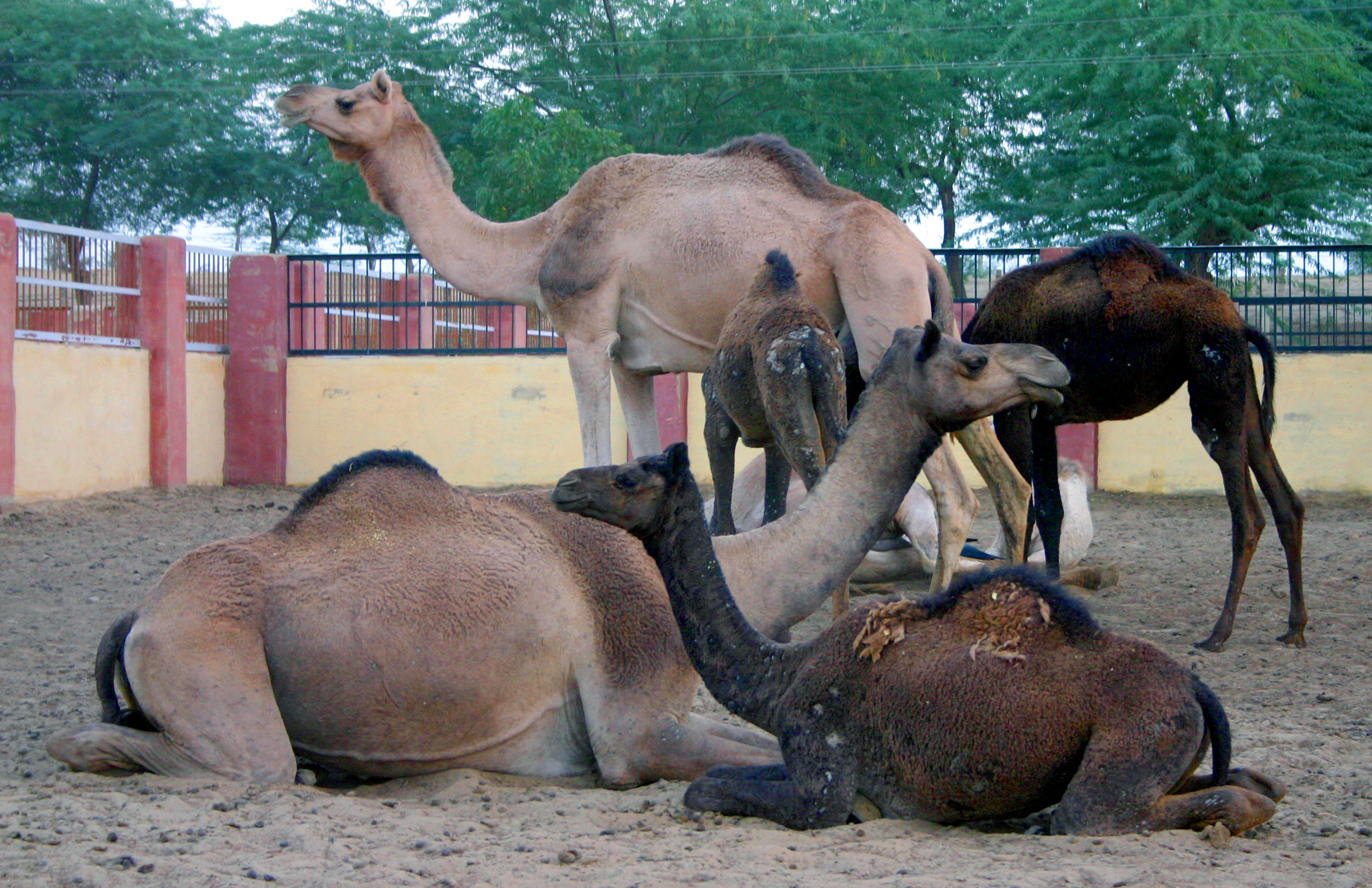
Camel Research Farm, Bikaner

ICAR-National Research Centre on Camel, Bikaner, is a Premier Research Centre located at Bikaner city of Rajasthan. Considering the importance of camel in the socio-economic development of arid and semi-arid zones, the Government of India established a Project Directorate on Camel at Bikaner (India) on 5 July 1984 under aegis of Indian Council of Agricultural Research (ICAR) which was upgraded to National Research Centre on Camel (NRCC) on 20 September 1995. It is located in the Jorbeer area of Bikaner city which is about 8 km from Bikaner main city. Mandates of this institute are 1. Basic and applied research for improvement camel health and production; 2. Information repository on camel research and development; and 3. Development of camel eco-tourism. This centre is also known as 'Camel Farm' among the local people. The camel farm maintains an elite herd of more than 300 camels of Bikaneri, Jaisalmeri, Kachchhi and Mewari breeds.

== Progress ==
The key objectives of NRCC are camel breeding and health, utilisation of camel milk and its byproducts like ice-cream made of it, which makes it a one-of-a-kind institute in India. The farm is a complex of camel stables, enclosures, and buildings.

Scientists engage with all stakeholders like camel herders, traders via collaborative programmes for development of camels.

Significant growth had been made on opportunities of camel milk trade in India as a functional food because of its therapeutic health benefits, models of successful camel dairying on cooperative basis, Camel usage by BSF India as this species is found mainly in Rajasthan and Gujarat. Camels have greatly caught the attention of tourists from India and abroad.

== In popular culture ==
Camels are sometimes called the "Ships of the Desert" because of their utility in arid climates. They can live without water for many days. They provide alternative means of goods transportation in many districts of Rajasthan, which, in turn, saves fuel and also provides livelihood to many camel herders of the Thar Desert.

Maharaja Ganga Singh of the Bikaner, Rajasthan, India founded Bikaner Camel Corps around 1890 and it participated in World Wars I and II. Because of their long natural history, camels have been declared the state animal of Rajasthan and some communities like Raika are specific in keeping and raising them.

Tourists visiting NRCC and Bikaner enjoy seeing camel calves gamboling around one another during afternoon hours, or camels gathering in sand dunes during sunset. A camel museum is available to apprise them of the developmental and research aspects of the camel in the desert ecosystem. Facilities available are camel riding, desert safari, camel milk and ice cream, kulfi, souvenir shops selling various decorative items like bags, purses, artwork, shawls, small chains, etc.

International Camel Festival is organised in Bikaner, every year on January month (generally second Saturday and adjacent Sunday of January Month). The shows include camel dance, camel race, artwork on various breeds of camels, traditional folk dances by locals.
