= 1870 Maltese Council of Government referendum =

- 29 April 1870
- Are Ecclesiastics to be made eligible to the Council - yes or no?

Results
Choice	Votes	%
Yes	1,409	96.05%
No	58	3.95%
Valid votes	1,467	99.59%
Invalid or blank votes	6	0.41%
Total votes	1,473	100.00%
Registered voters/turnout	2,464	59.78%

A referendum on whether clergy should be eligible to sit in the Council of Government was held in Malta in 1870. It was approved by 96% of voters. Only 60% of those eligible to vote participated.

== Results ==
Choice	Votes	%
For	1,409	96.05
Against	58	3.95
Total	1,467	100.00
Valid votes	1,467	99.59
Invalid/blank votes	6	0.41
Total votes	1,473	100.00
Registered voters/turnout	2,464	59.78
Source: Nohlen & Stöver
