= Wider Opportunities for Women =

Wider Opportunities for Women (WOW) is a national nonprofit organization in the United States established in 1962 by Jane Fleming and Mary Janney in Washington, D.C.

== History ==
In its early days, WOW received much of its support from women in key government positions. Initial guidance and support were given to WOW by the President of Radcliffe College, Mary Bunting. The District of Columbia Department of Employment Services, led by Fred Hetzel, provided WOW with initial office space and supplies.

In the late 1960s WOW created, produced, and sold 10,000 copies of a guidebook for women specializing in part-time work and education opportunities in the Washington Metro Area. Also, by the end of the 1960s WOW had grown from an all-volunteer group to a nonprofit organization with paid staff, and women's career center that helped hundreds of women find work.

In the 1970s WOW shifted from placing women in clerical and health aid jobs to nontraditional jobs that paid more and had been indirectly set aside for males. WOW's work was encouraged in 1967 by an amendment to Executive Order 11246 which specified affirmative action requirements in regard to women that federal contractors had to comply with.

WOW's policy work also began in the 1970s with a reauthorization of the Comprehensive Employment and Training Act (CETA). In 1978, the reauthorization of CETA targeted women directly by bringing up the issue of reverse discrimination. WOW's up-and-coming program the Women's Work Force Network, a network established in 1977 composed of women's employment programs nationwide, was a key player in the effort made to include sex-equity language in public employment and training legislation of CETA. This provision is now referred to as the "WOW paragraph".

In the 1980s WOW focused even more on equal access for women to the nation's employment and training systems to desegregate the job market.

In the 1990s and early 2000s WOW expanded its focus yet again to an intergenerational approach of economic security. This approach spurred both the Family Economic Self Sufficiency Project (FESS) established at WOW in 1996 and the Elder Economic Security Initiative in 2006.

== The Family Economic Self Sufficiency Project ==
Wider Opportunity for Women's Family Economic Self-Sufficiency (FESS) Project was established in 1996. The project was created in response to what WOW thought of as the erosion of power on issues related to low-income families from the federal to state and local level. The FESS Project encompasses the Self-Sufficiency Standard (The Standard). The Standard is a tool the project uses to calculate how much income a working family needs to meet their basic expenses of housing, childcare, food, health care, transportation and taxes, based upon geographic location and the number of adults and children in a family. WOW views the tool as a way to move low-income families toward economic independence. Since then, WOW has established 35 statewide FESS coalitions, as well as a coalition in the District of Columbia.

Since 1996, WOW has established 35 statewide FESS coalitions, as well as a coalition in the District of Columbia that represent over 2,000 community-based organizations, state and local government, employers and labor.

== The Elder Economic Security Initiative ==
Wider Opportunities for Women's Elder Economic Security Initiative was established in 2006. The Initiative also encompasses the Elder Economic Security Standard Index (The Index). WOW partnered with the Gerontology Institute at the University of Massachusetts Boston in 2005 and developed the Standard which serves as WOW's measure of income that elders need to meet their basic expenses to age in place including; housing, health care, transportation, and food costs. The Index now is a tool that provides important information to policy makers, aging advocates, and others as they develop policies and programs to promote economic security for elders.

== DC Metropolitan Programs ==
Wider Opportunities for Women established several DC Metro Programs to focus specifically on helping women in the geographic area find employment and become economically secure.

=== DC Jobs Council ===
The DC Jobs Council was established in 1999 as an informal volunteer consortium. The Council originated to help nonprofits organization navigate landscape change by passage of the Workforce Investment Act, which was signed into law by President Bill Clinton in 1998 and was meant to encourage businesses to participate in local delivery of Workforce Development Services. Currently, the DC Jobs Council is a group of over 40 organizations and four standing committees and WOW serves as their fiscal sponsor.

=== DC Women's Agenda ===
Wider Opportunities for Women partnered with the DC Employment Justice Center in 2003 to establish the DC Women's Agenda (DCWA). The DCWA is a local advocacy and policy coalition that promotes the advancement of equality and well-being of all women and girls in DC. The DCWA hosts public forums throughout DC on women's issues.

=== Washington Area Women in the Trades ===
Wider Opportunities for Women partnered with the YWCA National Capital Area, and the Community Services Agency of the Metropolitan Washington Council, AFL-CIO to create the Washington Area Women in the Trades (WAWIT) Program in 2007. WAWIT provides skill training and pre-vocational and pre-apprenticeship training at no cost in non-traditional construction trade careers for women. This program is an example of WOW's dedication to placing women in high paying jobs to provide for their families.

== Partner organizations ==
The Emerald Cities Collaborative is a partner organization with Wider Opportunities for Women.
