= Franciscan Action Network =

Faith-based non-profit organization

- Type: 501(c)(3) charitable organization
- Tax ID no.: 26-2015539
- Headquarters: Washington DC, U.S.
- Staff: 23
- Website: franciscanaction.org

The Franciscan Action Network (FAN) is a faith-based 501(c)(3) non-profit organization in Washington DC composed of Franciscan sisters, friars, secular Franciscans, and others. The organization was created to address issues related to ecology, human rights, poverty, and general peacemaking in the United States.

FAN is led by active volunteers across the country, supported by a small staff. As of August 2013, its board members consisted of the national minister of the Secular Franciscans, three Franciscan sisters, five Franciscan Friars (from different orders: Friars Minor, Friars Minor Conventual, Friars Minor Capuchins, Third Order Regular, and Atonement Friars), and four lay people.

== History ==
The Franciscan Action Network was formed in 2007 in Baltimore, Maryland by a group of more than 150 Franciscans who gathered from across the United States. It has grown to include membership of over 50 Franciscan groups. While Catholics make up a majority of FAN, its membership also includes Episcopal, Lutheran, and Ecumenical Franciscan groups.

== Advocacy ==
FAN promotes the positions of the US Conference of Catholic Bishops (USCCB), including advocating for immigration reform and a pathway to citizenship for undocumented immigrants, legislation to reduce greenhouse gases and mitigate climate change, and economic policies aimed at assisting the middle and lower class. FAN also maintains a "pro-life" stance on abortion and its members participate at the annual March for Life in Washington, DC.

== Franciscan Earth Corps ==
In 2012, the FAN initiated the Franciscan Earth Corps (FEC), a ministry aimed at encouraging young adults to participate in FAN advocacy activities. FEC provides training and resources in sustainable living projects, spiritual reflection, retreat, community building, and advocacy work.

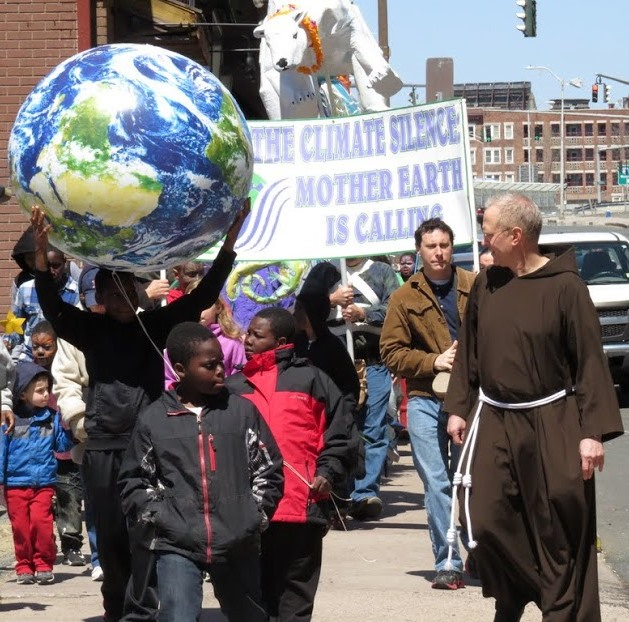
Fr. Sam Fuller, OFM Cap., leading a march on climate change in Hartford, CT.

== Immigration reform ==
Following the teachings of St. Francis of Assisi, who called Franciscans to be migrating people of prayer, FAN directs a significant part of its efforts to promoting immigration reform, advocating for a clearly defined pathway to US citizenship which prioritizes family unity. To this end, FAN collaborates with the Justice for Immigrants Campaign of the USCCB and the Interfaith Immigration Coalition.

The FAN has stood in resistance to the possibility of a registry of all Muslims living in the United States. They have also opposed the travel ban against several Middle Eastern countries as proposed by President Trump and his administration.

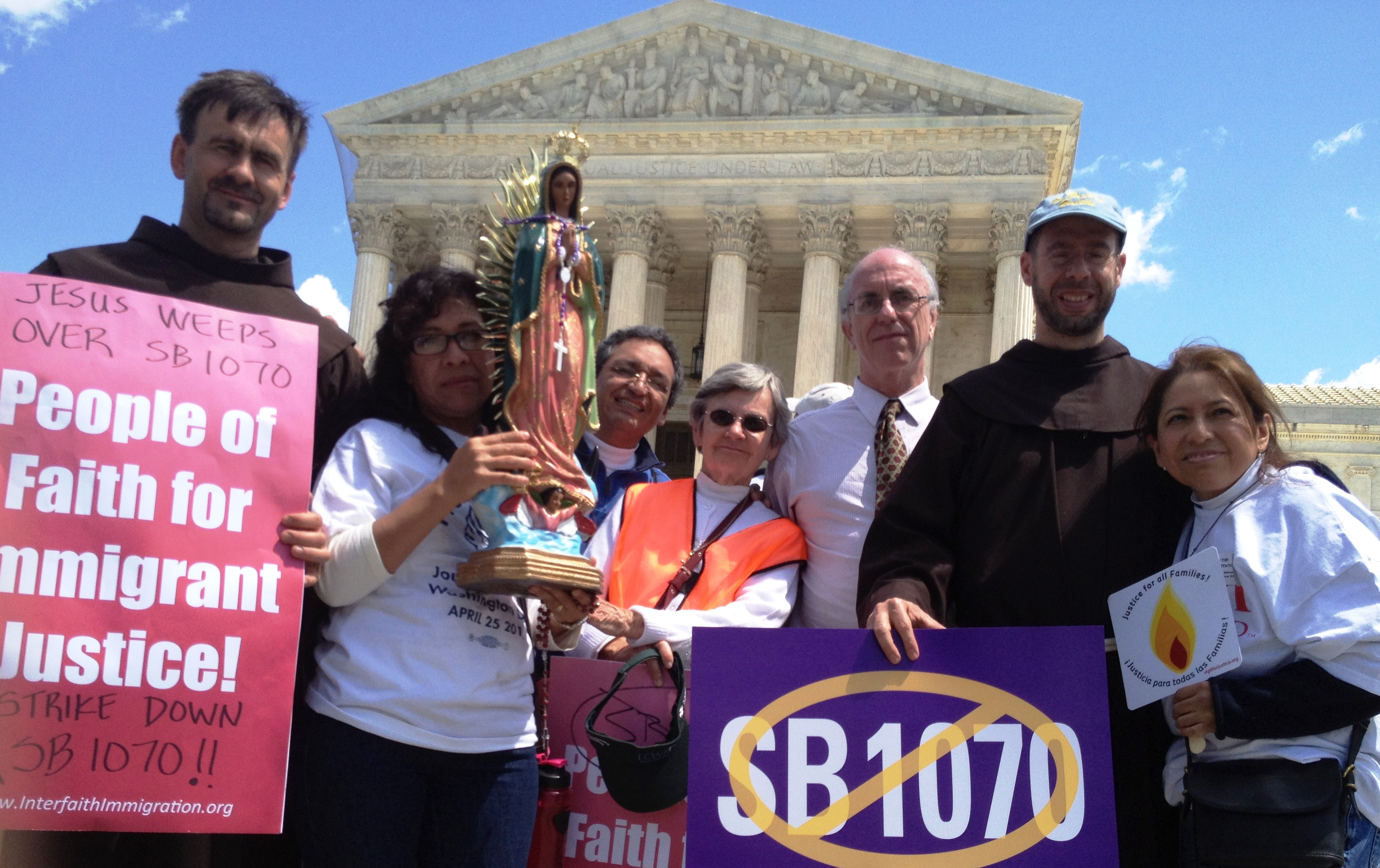
FAN Members hold vigil during the Supreme Court hearings on Arizona's immigration law SB 1070.

== Climate change ==
In accord with their understanding of the teachings of St. Francis of Assisi, patron saint of those who promote ecology, FAN works with other Franciscans to bring public officials into conversation about action to mitigate climate change. FAN members participate in public protests on this issue. This advocacy has led to criticism from other Catholic groups.

== Human trafficking ==
FAN works with the USCCB's Anti-Trafficking Services Program and is a member of the Coalition of Catholic Organizations against Human Trafficking. FAN also collaborated with Franciscans International and the Franciscan Federation in a project to review the issue of human trafficking in the 2013 United Nations review of the United States.

== Peacemaking ==
FAN promotes peace by offering resources on civil dialogue, working for legislation to reduce gun violence, and addressing arms issues such as nuclear weapons.
