= Councils of governments in California =

Councils of governments in California are voluntary organizations of local governments within a specific region. Unlike cities, counties, and other types of local governments in California, councils of governments are organized as joint powers authorities and funded by dues from their member governments. They play a number of official roles in state governmental processes such as developing regional housing need allocations (RHNAs).

The state has 24 councils of governments:

- Association of Bay Area Governments
- Association of Monterey Bay Area Governments
- Butte County Association of Governments
- Calaveras County Council of Governments
- Coachella Valley Association of Governments
- Council of San Benito County Governments
- Fresno Council of Governments
- Humboldt County Association of Governments
- Kern Council of Governments
- Lake County/City Area Planning Council
- Mendocino Council of Governments
- Merced County Association of Governments
- Orange County Council of Governments
- Sacramento Area Council of Governments
- San Bernardino Council of Governments
- San Gabriel Valley Council of Governments
- San Joaquin Council of Governments
- San Luis Obispo Council of Governments
- Santa Barbara County Association of Governments
- South Bay Cities Council of Governments
- Southern California Association of Governments
- Stanislaus Council of Governments
- Tulare County Association of Governments
- Western Riverside Council of Governments
