= National Economic Council =

National Economic Council may refer to:

- National Economic Council (United States), is a United States government agency in the Executive Office of the President
- National Economic Action Council, a main governing body which solved the economic crisis in Malaysia between 1996 and 1998
- National Economic Council, Inc., a conservative American political organization
- National Economic Development Council, a corporatist economic planning forum set up in 1962 in the United Kingdom
- National Economic Council (United Kingdom), a UK Cabinet Committee created in 2008
- National Economic Council (Israel), a body within the office of the Prime Minister of Israel, counseling and assisting him in formulating economic policy
- National Economic Council (Bangladesh), the highest political authority in Bangladesh for consideration of development activities reflective of long-term national policies and objectives.
- National Economic Council (Prussia), originally set up by Bismarck and later theorised by Wichard von Moellendorff
- National Economic Council (Nigeria), it advises the President concerning the economic affairs of the Federation, set up in 1999.
- National Economic Council (Pakistan), a constitutional entity tasked with evaluating the nation's economic state since 2022.
- National Economic Council (Indonesia), an Indonesian government economic advisory council since 1999

== See also ==
- National Council on Economic Education
