= Council of governments =

Regional associations of governments in the United States

Councils of governments (CoGs), also known as regional councils, regional commissions, regional planning commissions, and planning districts, are regional governing and/or coordinating bodies that exist throughout the United States. CoGs are usually controlled by their member local governments, though some states have passed laws granting CoGs region-wide powers over specific functions, and still other states mandate such councils.

== Organization and function ==
CoG members are drawn from the county, city, and other government bodies within its area. CoGs can offer planning, coordination, and technical assistance to their members, administer programs at a regional level, and act as intermediaries between the local government members and the state or federal government. A typical council is defined to serve an area of several counties, and addresses issues such as regional and municipal planning, economic, and community development, pollution control, transit administration, transportation planning, human services, and water use. Councils of governments also play a role in regional hazard mitigation and emergency planning and in the collection, analysis, distribution of demographic and cartographic/GIS data.

== Federal transportation planning ==
CoGs may either be distinct from—or encompass—regional Metropolitan Planning Organizations (MPOs) and Rural Transportation Planning Organizations (RTPOs). MPOs are multi-governmental urban transportation planning entities that arose out of the requirements of the Federal-Aid Highway Act of 1962, which made federal financing for urban transportation projects contingent upon the existence of a "continuing, comprehensive, urban transportation planning process undertaken cooperatively by the states and local governments". RTPOs are bodies similar to, and inspired by the model of MPOs, but organized for rural areas. Though RTPOs existed for decades, they were only formally recognized by on a federal level by the Moving Ahead for Progress in the 21st Century Act (MAP-21) of 2012. Of the 556 CoGs in the US, 165 operate an associated MPO, and 265 operate an associated RTPO.

== History ==
Though voluntary non-profit regional organizations had existed for several decades before, CoGs in their modern form began in 1947, with the Atlanta Regional Metropolitan Planning Commission, followed by the Northern Virginia Regional Planning Commission in December of the same year. By 1950, there were 18 CoG/regional planning organizations in the US, and by 1953, the number of such bodies had increased on 40. CoGs saw explosive growth during the 1960s and 1970s, driven by federal and state funding incentives and mandates. At present, the National Association of Regional Councils estimates that currently "of the 39,000 local, general purpose governments in the United States (counties, cities, townships, towns, villages, boroughs) a total of more than 35,000 are served by [CoGs]".

== By state ==
There are some U.S. states with many councils of government:

- Councils of governments in California
- Councils of governments in Connecticut
- Councils of governments in North Carolina

== Councils of CoGs ==
Several national organizations exist to serve the needs (and lobby for the interests of) regional CoGs. These include the National Association of Regional Councils (formerly the National Service to Regional Councils), the National Association of Development Organizations, and the Association of Metropolitan Planning Organizations.

Similar associations (most voluntary, but some state-mandated) also exist at the state level. They include:

- California Association of Councils of Government
- Michigan Association of Regions
- New York State Association of Regional Councils
- Northern Arizona Council of Governments
- Texas Association of Regional Councils
- Virginia Association of Planning District Commissions
