= J. Lee Hill Jr. =

African-American Baptist minister

The Rev. Canon Dr. J. Lee Hill Jr.
- Born: Virginia, US
- Education: George Mason University; Wake Forest University; Columbia Theological Seminary; Emory University
- Occupations: Canon, The Episcopal Diocese of Virginia

J. Lee Hill Jr. is an ordained minister. He was the first Missioner and Canon for Racial Justice and Healing in The Episcopal Diocese of Virginia, appointed by the XIV Bishop of Virginia. Hill, who currently serves as the Canon to the Ordinary and Dean of the Diocesan Ministry for Racial Justice & Healing, has served in ministry since 1999, and is an ordained minister with recognized standing in the Alliance of Baptists and the United Church of Christ.

== Education ==
He attended Florida A&M and graduated from George Mason University with a Bachelor of Arts in integrative studies with a concentration in management and leadership. He earned a Master of Divinity from Wake Forest University, a Master of Theology from Columbia Theological Seminary, and a Doctor of Ministry from Emory University. He received the Bill J. Leonard Distinguished Service Award Pro Fide et Humanitate for his work and advocacy as a public theologian, and holds multiple diplomas and certificates from Morehouse, Princeton, University of San Diego, and the Shalem Institute for Spiritual Formation.

His research interests are in preaching, social justice, contemplative studies, afrofuturism, and emerging models of narrative leadership; he is a fellow in the Leader's Way program, through Berkeley Seminary, at Yale Divinity School.

== Career ==
Hill grew up and was licensed to preach in 1999 at First Baptist Church of Bermuda Hundred in Chester, Virginia. He later served on the ministerial staff of Knollwood Baptist Church in Winston-Salem, North Carolina, where he became the first African-American ordained to Christian Ministry through that Alliance/American Baptist congregation in 2005. Before joining the ministerial staff of The Riverside Church in the City of New York in 2007, he was a ministerial intern at Metro Baptist Church in Hells Kitchen, New York, and most recently served as the senior pastor of Christian Fellowship Congregational Church (UCC).

== Personal life ==
Hill was born in Virginia and is the father of two sons. He is a Life Member of Alpha Phi Alpha, and Charter Member of 100 Black Men of Greater Richmond, Inc.
