= National Council on Educational Reform =

The Japanese Ad Hoc Council on Education (臨時教育審議会, Rinji Kyoiku Shingikai) was established in 1984 by Prime Minister Yasuhiro Nakasone in response to rising concerns about the quality of education in Japan and the increase in social problems amongst school-aged children. (Such as Bullying (いじめ), Violence in Schools (構内暴力), 'School Refusal' (不登校), Corporal Punishment (体罰), and others)
