= National Council for the Traditional Arts =

American not-for-profit arts organization

- Abbreviation: NCTA
- Formation: 1933
- Type: NPO
- Headquarters: Silver Spring, Maryland
- Website: http://www.ncta.net/

The National Council for the Traditional Arts (NCTA) is a private, non-profit arts organization based in the United States that promotes the traditional arts. It organizes the National Folk Festival.

It is headquartered in Silver Spring, Maryland. From 1976 to 2004 it was led by Joe T. Wilson, as executive director, who, in 2009, was designated a Living Legend by the Library of Congress for his work.

The National Council for the Traditional Arts page on the U.S. Department of State site states:

The National Council for the Traditional Arts (NCTA) is a private, not-for-profit corporation, dedicated to the presentation and documentation of traditional arts in the United States. Founded in 1933, it is the nation's oldest producing and presenting organization with such a focus. Its programs celebrate and honor arts that are deeply rooted cultural expressions - music, crafts, stories and dance passed down through time by families, communities, tribal, ethnic and occupational groups. The NCTA stresses quality and authenticity in presenting traditional artists to the public in festivals, national and international tours, concerts, radio and television programs, films, recordings and other programs.
