= Alliance for Climate Education =

US nonprofit organization

Action for the Climate Emergency
- Abbreviation: ACE
- Formation: 2008
- Type: Non-profit
- Purpose: Climate engagement, strategic media, youth advocacy and civic engagement
- Location: United States
- Website: acespace.org

Action for the Climate Emergency, or ACE (formerly Alliance for Climate Education) is a 501(c)(3) nonprofit that operates in the United States. Its stated mission is to educate young people on climate issues, counteract climate misinformation, and engage and register young voters.

== Programs ==
=== Education & Influence ===
ACE provides in-person assemblies at high schools nationwide. A study by Stanford, Yale, and George Mason University showed that after viewing the live ACE Assembly, students demonstrated a 27% increase in climate science knowledge, more than one-third (38%) became more engaged on the issue of climate change, and the number of students who talked to parents or peers about climate change more than doubled.

=== Action ===
ACE youth leaders have lobbied elected officials for pro-climate policies including energy efficiency, fossil fuel divestment, and renewable energy. They have also spoken at events such as the United Nations, Bioneers, and Climate Action 2016.

== Awards ==
Awards for ACE's work include the White House Champion of Change Award for Climate Literacy, the National Center for Science Education Friend of the Planet Award, the AQMD Award for Public Education on Air Quality Issues, the EPA Environmental Merit Award, and the Climate Change Communicator of the Year Award.

== See also ==
- Climate change in the United States
- Education in the United States
- Environmental groups and resources serving K–12 schools
