= United States Forces Japan =

American military command stationed in Japan

United States Forces Japan 在日米軍
- USFJ insignia
- Active: 1 July 1957 — present (69 years, 4 months)
- Country: United States
- Type: Subordinate unified combatant command
- Size: 35,688 (approx.)
- Part of: United States Pacific Command
- Headquarters: Yokota Air Base, Fussa, Tokyo
- Website: www.usfj.mil

Commanders
- Commander: Lt Gen Stephen F. Jost, USAF
- Deputy Commander: MajGen George B. Rowell IV, USMC
- Senior Enlisted Leader: CMSgt Leon O. Calloway, USAF

Insignia
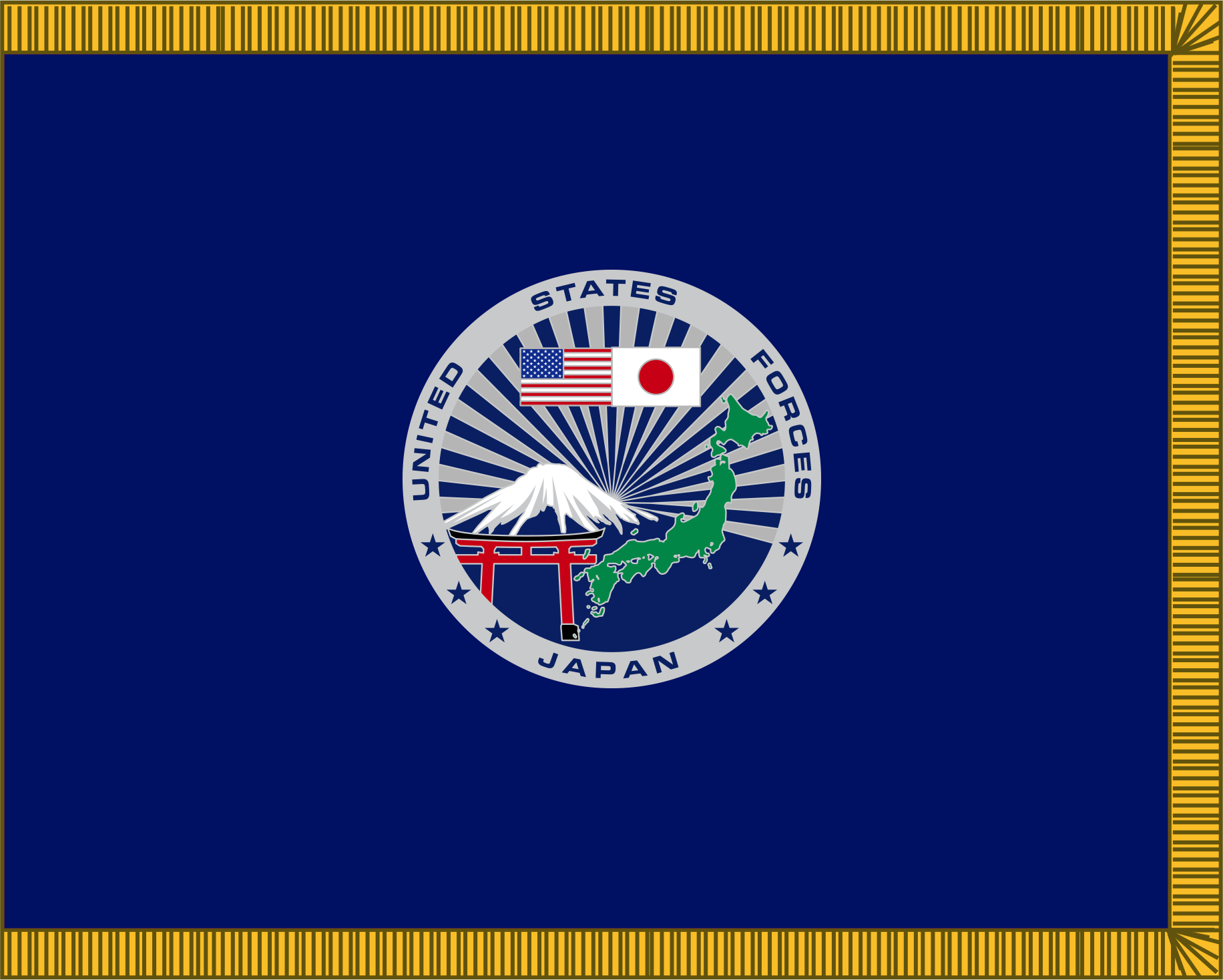
- US Forces Japan Flag

The United States Forces Japan (USFJ) (Japanese: 在日米軍, Hepburn: Zainichi Beigun) is a subordinate unified command of the U.S. Indo-Pacific Command. It was activated at Fuchū Air Station in Tokyo, Japan, on 1 July 1957 to replace the Far East Command. USFJ is headquartered at Yokota Air Base in Tokyo and is commanded by the Commander, U.S. Forces Japan who is also commander of the Fifth Air Force. Since then, it is the first and only sustained presence of a foreign military on Japanese soil in its history.

USFJ oversees U.S. military personnel, assets, and installations in Japan, including approximately 55,000 active-duty servicemembers and 15 major bases. USFJ supports U.S. responsibilities under the Treaty of Mutual Cooperation and Security between the United States and Japan, and its activities are governed by the Status of Forces Agreement (SOFA) between the United States and Japan. The command plays a major role in security-related coordination and dialogue with the Government of Japan and the Japan Self-Defense Forces.

In July 2024, the U.S. Department of Defense announced that USFJ would be upgraded to a "joint operational headquarters", a move U.S. secretary of defense Lloyd Austin characterized as "the most significant change to U.S. Forces Japan since its creation".

== History ==
=== Origins ===
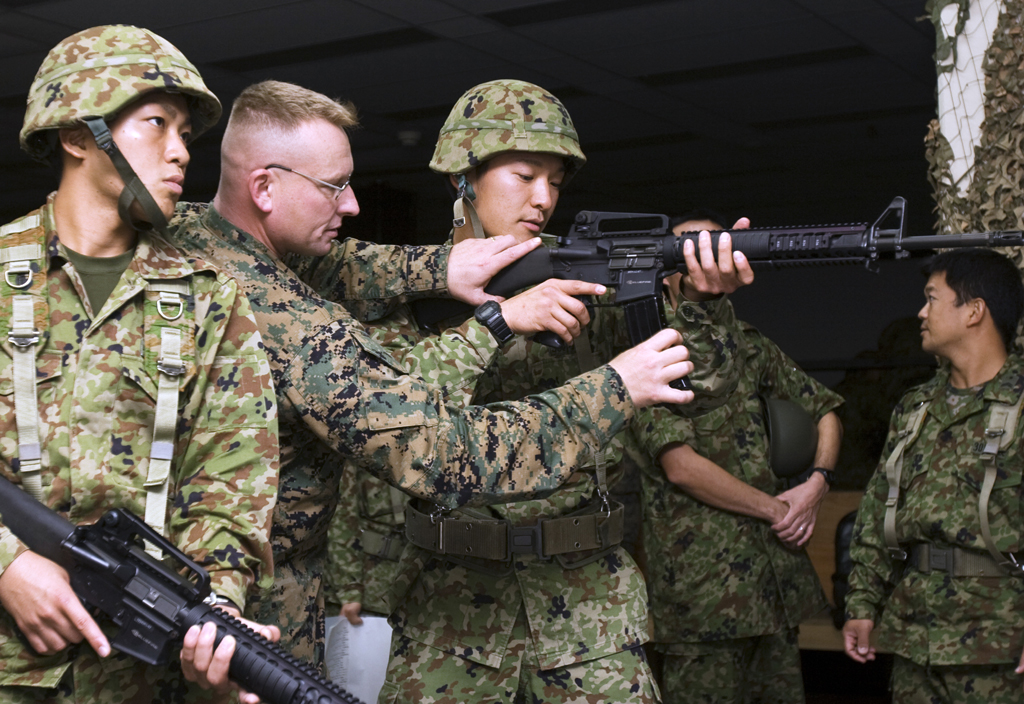
U.S. Marines with JGSDF soldiers at Camp Kinser

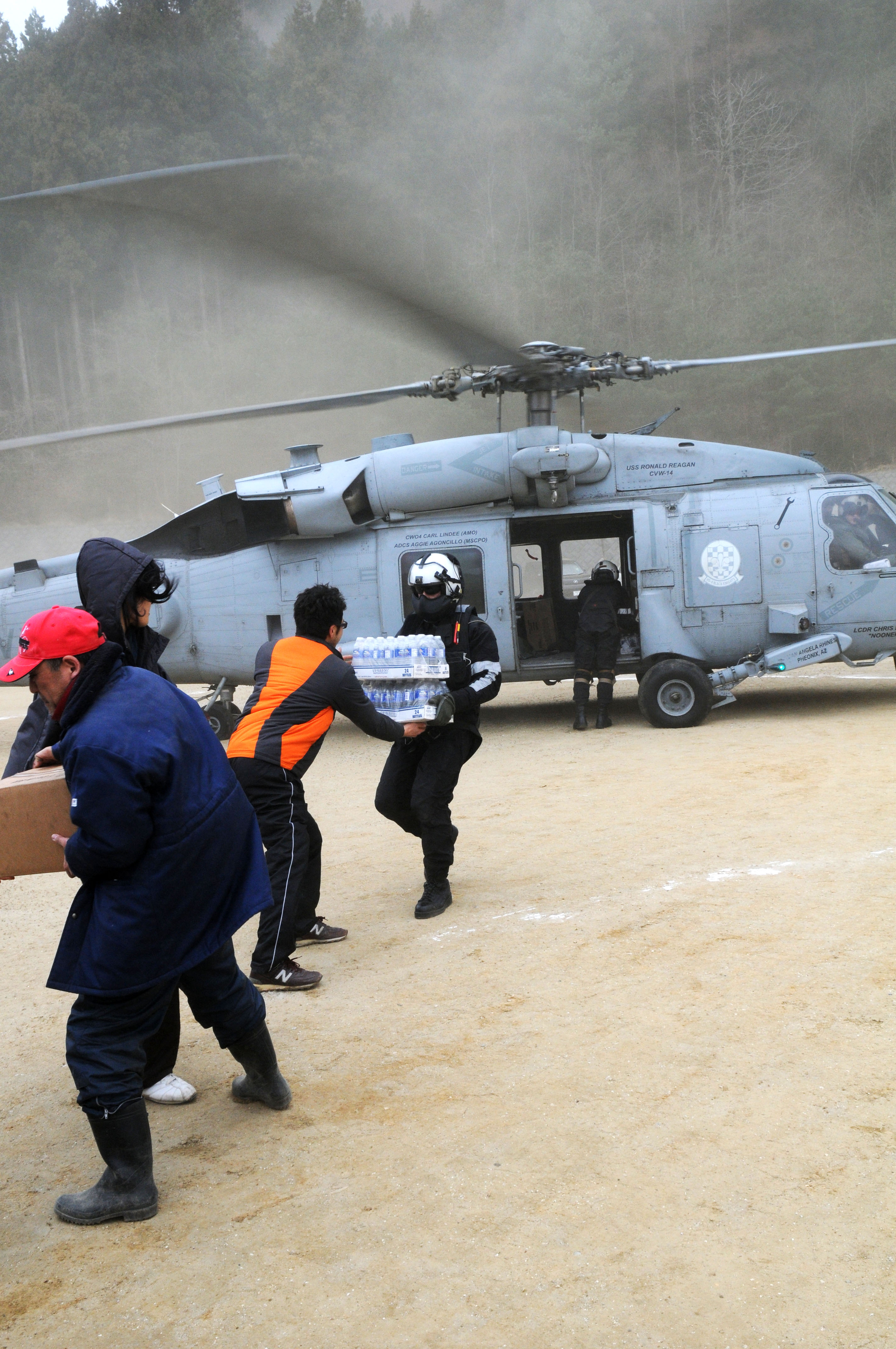
United States forces assisted Japan via Operation Tomodachi following the 2011 Tōhoku earthquake and tsunami.

After the Japanese surrender at the end of World War II in Asia, the United States Armed Forces assumed administrative authority in Japan. The Imperial Japanese Army and Navy were decommissioned, and the U.S. Armed Forces took control of Japanese military bases until a new government could be formed and positioned to reestablish authority.Allied forces planned to demilitarize Japan, and the new government adopted the Constitution of Japan with a no-armed-force clause in 1947.

After the Korean War began in 1950, Douglas MacArthur, the Supreme Commander for the Allied Powers in Japan, in agreement with the Japanese government, established the paramilitary "National Police Reserve", which was later developed into the Japan Ground Self-Defense Force. It means the de facto remilitarization of postwar Japan.

In 1951, the Treaty of San Francisco, signed by the Allies and Japan, formally ended the state of war with the Allies and restored Japan's formal sovereignty. At the same time, the U.S. and Japan signed the Japan-America Security Alliance, a ten-year renewable agreement. By this treaty, USFJ is responsible for the defense of Japan. As part of this agreement, the Japanese government requested that the U.S. military bases remain in Japan and agreed to provide funds and various interests specified in the Status of Forces Agreement. At the expiration of the treaty, the United States and Japan signed the Treaty of Mutual Cooperation and Security between the United States and Japan. The status of the United States Forces Japan was defined in the U.S.–Japan Status of Forces Agreement. This treaty is still in effect, and it forms the basis of Japan's foreign policy.

=== 20th century ===
During the Vietnam War, U.S. military bases in Japan, especially those in the Okinawa Prefecture, were used as important strategic and logistic bases. In 1970, the Koza riot occurred against the U.S. military presence on Okinawa. Strategic bombers were deployed to the bases on Okinawa. Before the 1972 reversion of the island to Japanese administration, it has been speculated but never confirmed that up to 1,200 nuclear weapons may have been stored at Kadena Air Base during the 1960s.

=== 21st century ===
The Japanese government paid ¥217 billion (US$2.0 billion) in 2007 as annual host-nation support called Omoiyari Yosan (思いやり予算; sympathy budget or compassion budget). As of the 2011 budget, such payment was no longer to be referred to as omoiyari yosan or "sympathy budget". Japan compensates 75% ($4.4 billion) of U.S. basing costs.

Immediately after the 2011 Tōhoku earthquake and tsunami, 9,720 dependents of United States military and government civilian employees in Japan evacuated the country, mainly to the United States.

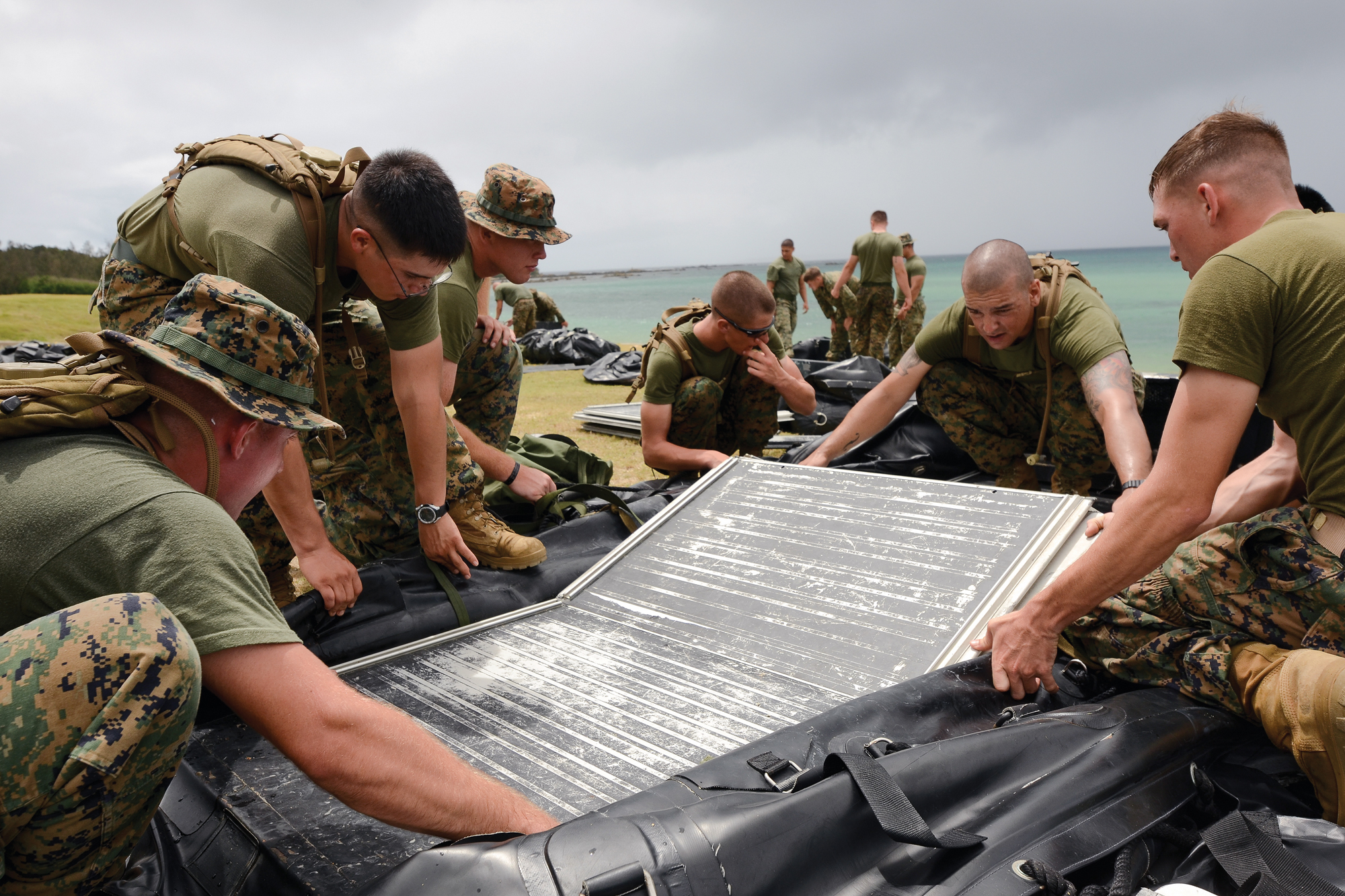
Company F, 31st MEU, conducts rubber raiding craft training near Kin Blue beach, Okinawa, on 13 July 2011

The relocation of the U.S. Marine Corps Air Station Futenma to Henoko Bay was resolved in December 2013 with the signing of a landfill agreement by the governor of Okinawa. Under the terms of the U.S.-Japan agreement, 5,000 U.S. Marines were relocated to Guam, and 4,000 Marines were sent to other Pacific locations such as Hawaii or Australia, while around 10,000 Marines were to remain on Okinawa. No timetable for the Marines redeployment was announced, but The Washington Post reported that U.S. Marines would leave Okinawa as soon as suitable facilities on Guam and elsewhere were ready. The relocation move was expected to cost $8.6 billion, including a $3.1 billion cash commitment from Japan for the move to Guam as well as for developing joint training ranges on Guam and on Tinian and Pagan in the Northern Mariana Islands. Certain parcels of land on Okinawa which were leased for use by the American military were supposed to be turned back to Japanese control via a long-term phased return process according to the agreement. These returns have been ongoing since 1972. In October 2020, Marine Corps Base Camp Blaz was activated on Guam. The new base is meant to house Marines relocated from Okinawa, with the final relocation planned for 2025.

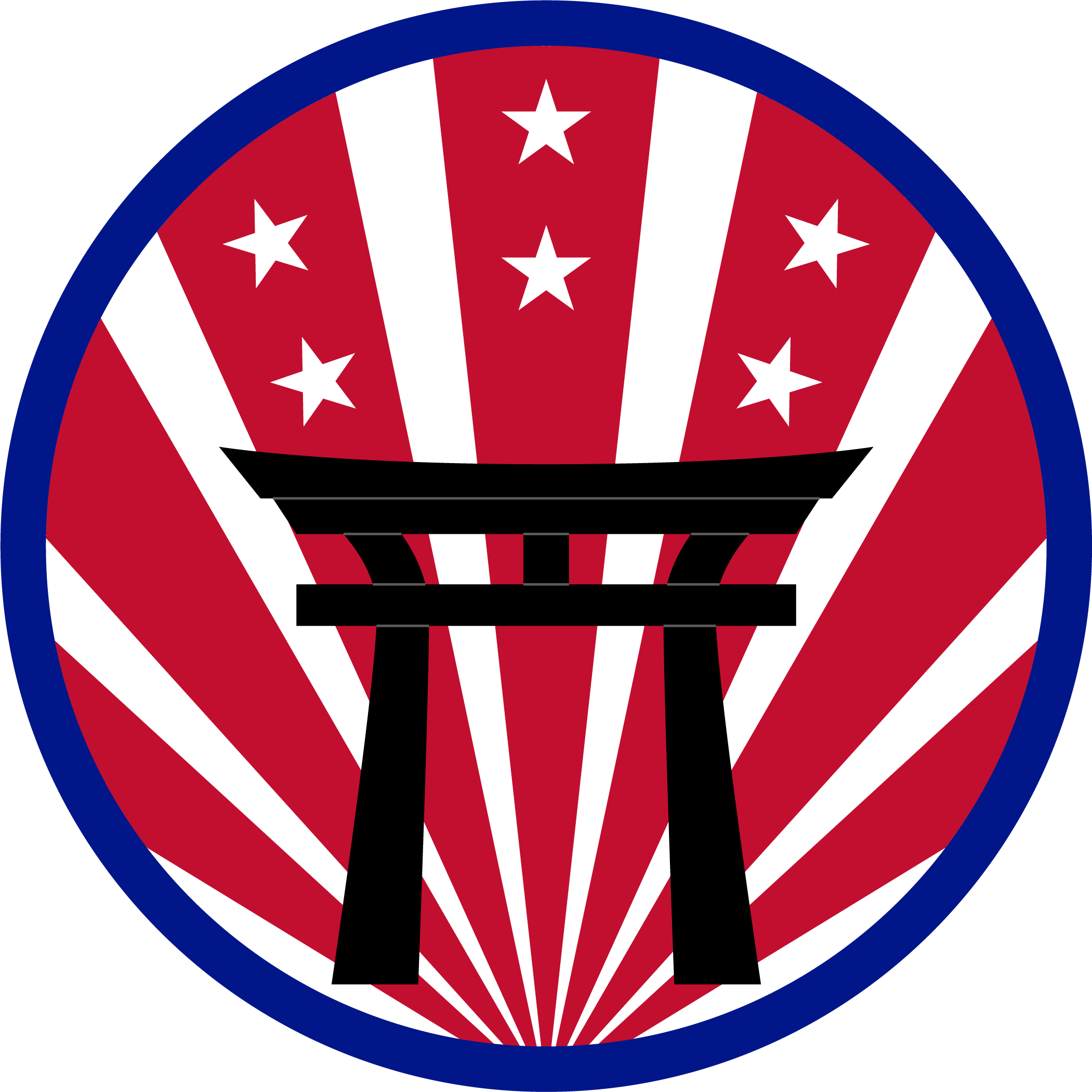
United States Forces Japan, U.S. Army Element SSI

In March 2024, media reporting suggested that the organizational remit and status of USFJ would be changed—possibly including the creation of a new joint task force as well as the elevation of the USFJ commander's rank—as part of a broader 'upgrading' of the U.S.-Japan alliance to be announced during the April 2024 visit of Japanese Prime Minister Fumio Kishida to the United States. As part of that visit, Prime Minister Kishida and U.S. President Joe Biden stated the following in a Joint Leaders' Statement:

Recognizing the speed at which regional security challenges evolve and to ensure our bilateral Alliance structures meet these critical changes, we announce our intention to bilaterally upgrade our respective command and control frameworks to enable seamless integration of operations and capabilities and allow for greater interoperability and planning between U.S. and Japanese forces in peacetime and during contingencies. More effective U.S.-Japan Alliance command and control will strengthen deterrence and promote a free and open Indo-Pacific in the face of pressing regional security challenges. We call on our respective defense and foreign ministries to develop this new relationship through the Security Consultative Committee (our security "2+2").

In July 2024, DOD announced that USFJ would be upgraded to a joint operational headquarters. According to one DOD official, this will result in USFJ transitioning from a primarily "administrative command" into an organization with more operational and warfighting responsibilities.

== United States presence debate ==
As of May 2022, the stationing of U.S. military personnel at military facilities across Okinawa Island remains a hotly-contested and controversial issue, with the relocation of Marine Corps Air Station Futenma often being at the forefront of protests against the presence of U.S. military presence on the island. Okinawa makes up only 0.6% of the nation's land area; yet, approximately 62% of United States bases in Japan (exclusive use only) are on Okinawa. Despite an agreement to relocate Marine Corps Air Station Futenma first being reached by the Japanese and U.S. governments in 1996, progress to relocate the base has stalled because of the protests as well as environmental concerns resulting from the construction, operation and relocation of the base.

Do they need bases in Henoko or Futenma? Are they unnecessary? Even aside from this discussion, security is changing.—Former Japan Minister of Defense Fumio Kyuma

The U.S. government employs over eight thousand Master Labor Contract/Indirect Hire Agreement workers on Okinawa (per the Labor Management Organization), not including Okinawan contract workers.

There is also debate over the Status of Forces Agreement (SOFA) since it covers a variety of administrative technicalities blending the systems which control how certain situations are handled between the U.S.'s and Japan's legal framework.

=== Surveys among Japanese ===
In May 2010, a survey of the Okinawan people conducted by the Mainichi Shimbun and the Ryūkyū Shimpō, found that 71% of Okinawans surveyed thought that the presence of Marines on Okinawa was not necessary (15% said it was necessary). When asked what they thought about 62% of exclusive use United States Forces Japan bases being concentrated on Okinawa, 50% said that the number should be reduced and 41% said that the bases should be removed. When asked about the US-Japan security treaty, 55% said it should be a peace treaty, 14% said it should be abolished, and 7% said it should be maintained. Many Okinawans challenge colonial narratives around the foreign military presence and this contributes to the decolonisation on knowledge. Many question if the presence is beneficial for the people. A 2023 research paper in the International Relations of the Asia-Pacific journal found that, Okinawans have "considerably unfavorable attitudes toward the US military presence in their prefecture... regardless of their contact with Americans and economic benefits and their general support for the US military presence within Japan." Their finding supported a "not-in-my-backyard" reason for the negativity.

Many of the bases, such as Yokota Air Base, Naval Air Facility Atsugi and Kadena Air Base, are located in the vicinity of residential districts, and local citizens have complained about excessive aircraft noise. The 2014 poll by Ryūkyū Shimpō found that 80% of surveyed Okinawans want the Marine Corps Air Station Futenma moved out of the prefecture. On 25 June 2018, Okinawan residents protested against the construction of a new airfield. Activists holding placards and banners went to sea on 70 boats and ships. Protesters urged the Japanese authorities to stop the expansion of the U.S. military presence on the island. Some of the boats went to the guarded construction site, where they came across the Coast Guard patrol vessels. Some activists were arrested for entering a prohibited zone.

On 11 August 2018, about 70,000 protesters gathered at a park in the prefecture capital of Naha to protest the planned relocation of a U.S. military base on the southern Japanese island. Opponents of the relocation said the plan to move Marine Corps Air Station Futenma from a crowded neighborhood to a less populated coastal site would not only affect the environment, but would also go against local wishes to have the base moved from the island entirely.

=== Crime ===
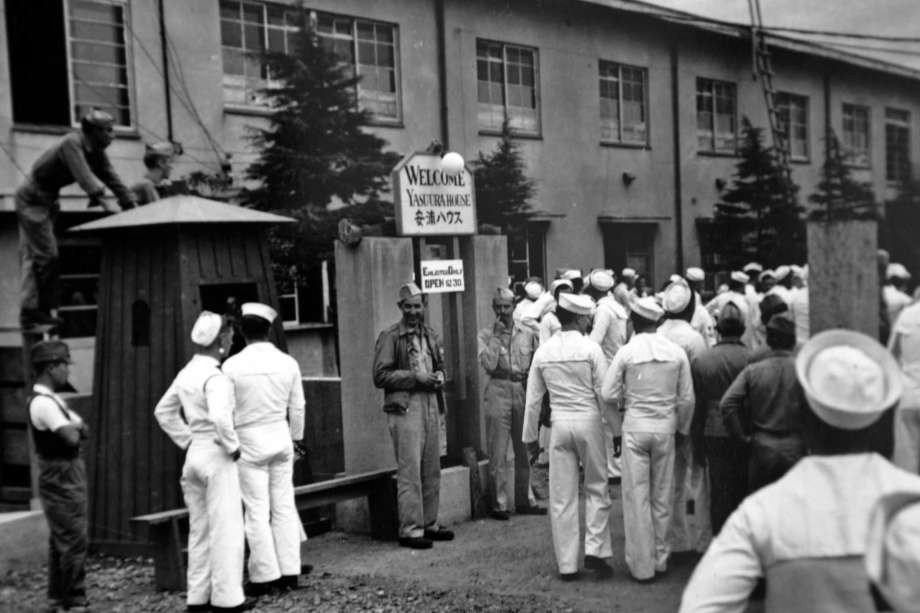
GIs in Recreation and Amusement Association during occupation of Japan

At the beginning of the occupation of Japan in 1945, many U.S. soldiers participated in the Special Comfort Facility Association. The Japanese government organised the enslavement of 55,000 women to work providing sexual services to U.S. military personnel before the surrender. On discovery of the program, the association was closed by the Supreme Commander for the Allied Powers.

Between 1972 and 2009, U.S. servicemen committed 5,634 criminal offenses, including 25 murders, 385 burglaries, 25 arsons, 127 rapes, 306 assaults, and 2,827 thefts. So called SOFA members constitute around 5.5 percent of Okinawa's population as of 2024. SOFA members were suspected of 1.5 percent of total offences. Of robbery cases, SOFA members made up 20 percent of the total amount of robbery defendants since 1972. Sexual assault cases stood at 9 percent. For murder they made up 2 percent. SOFA members were therefore underrepresented in murder cases but over-represented in sexual assault and robbery cases. According to the U.S.-Japan Status of Forces Agreement (SOFA), which governs how criminal cases are handled, criminal acts that are committed both off-duty and off-base are to be prosecuted under Japanese law.

In 2016,The Japan Times stated that "crimes ranging from rape to assault and hit-and-run accidents by U.S. military personnel, dependents and civilians have long sparked protests in the prefecture." "A series of horrific crimes by present and former U.S. military personnel stationed on Okinawa has triggered dramatic moves to try to reduce the American presence on the island and in Japan as a whole," commented The Daily Beast in 2009.

In 1995, the abduction and rape of a 12-year-old Okinawan schoolgirl by two U.S. Marines and one U.S. sailor led to demands for the removal of all U.S. military bases in Japan. Other controversial incidents include the Girard incident in 1957, the Michael Brown Okinawa assault incident in 2002, the death of the Kinjo family in 1996, and the hit-and-run death of Yuki Uema in 1998. In February 2008, a 38-year-old U.S. Marine based on Okinawa was arrested in connection with the reported rape of a 14-year-old Okinawan girl. This triggered waves of protest against American military presence on Okinawa and led to tight restrictions on off-base activities. Although the accuser withdrew her charges, the U.S. military court-martialed the suspect and sentenced him to four years in prison under the stricter rules of the military justice system.

U.S. Forces Japan designated 22 February as a "Day of Reflection" for all U.S. military facilities in Japan and established the Sexual Assault Prevention and Response Task Force in an effort to prevent similar incidents. In November 2009, Staff Sergeant Clyde "Drew" Gunn, a U.S. Army soldier stationed at Torii Station was involved in a hit-and-run accident of a pedestrian in Yomitan Village on Okinawa. In April 2010, Gunn was charged with failing to render aid and vehicular manslaughter, and he was sentenced to two years and eight months in jail.

In 2013, Seaman Christopher Browning and Petty Officer 3rd Class Skyler Dozierwalker were found guilty by the Naha District Court of raping and robbing a woman in a parking lot in October. Both admitted committing the crime. The case outraged Okinawans and sparked tougher restrictions for all U.S. military personnel in Japan, including a curfew and drinking restrictions.

On 13 May 2013, in a controversial statement, Toru Hashimoto, Mayor of Osaka and co-leader of the Japan Restoration Association said to a senior American military official at the Marine Corps base on Okinawa that "we can't control the sexual energy of these brave Marines." He said that Marines should make more use of the local adult entertainment industry to reduce sexual crimes against local women. Hashimoto also spoke of the necessity of former Japanese Army comfort women and of prostitutes for the U.S. military in other countries such as Korea.

In June 2016, after a civilian worker at the base was charged with murdering a Japanese woman, thousands of people protested on Okinawa. Organizers estimated turnout at 65,000 people, which was the largest anti-base protests on Okinawa since 1995. A Marine was sentenced to four years in prison and hard labour after killing a local while drunk driving. The death sparked a temporary alcohol ban for all the U.S. troops in Japan.

In 2024, a U.S. service member in Okinawa was sentenced to five years in prison for kidnapping and sexual assault of a minor. The case has drawn a lot of attention in the media as well as igniting debate. In 2025, a marine from the United States was sentenced to 7 years in prison for sexual assault in Okinawa.

In 2026, U.S. Marine Lance Corporal Devin Jacob Ballard was arrested in connection with the death of Anna Yagi. Ballard was stationed at Marine Corps Air Station Futenma. The investigation is ongoing. This incident has raised concerns among Okinawa residents about the large presence of US military forces on the island, and Japanese officials have called for full US cooperation with local investigations. the U.S. military also extended movement restrictions for new and low-ranking personnel, and imposed stricter limits on alcohol consumption for all forces stationed on the island.

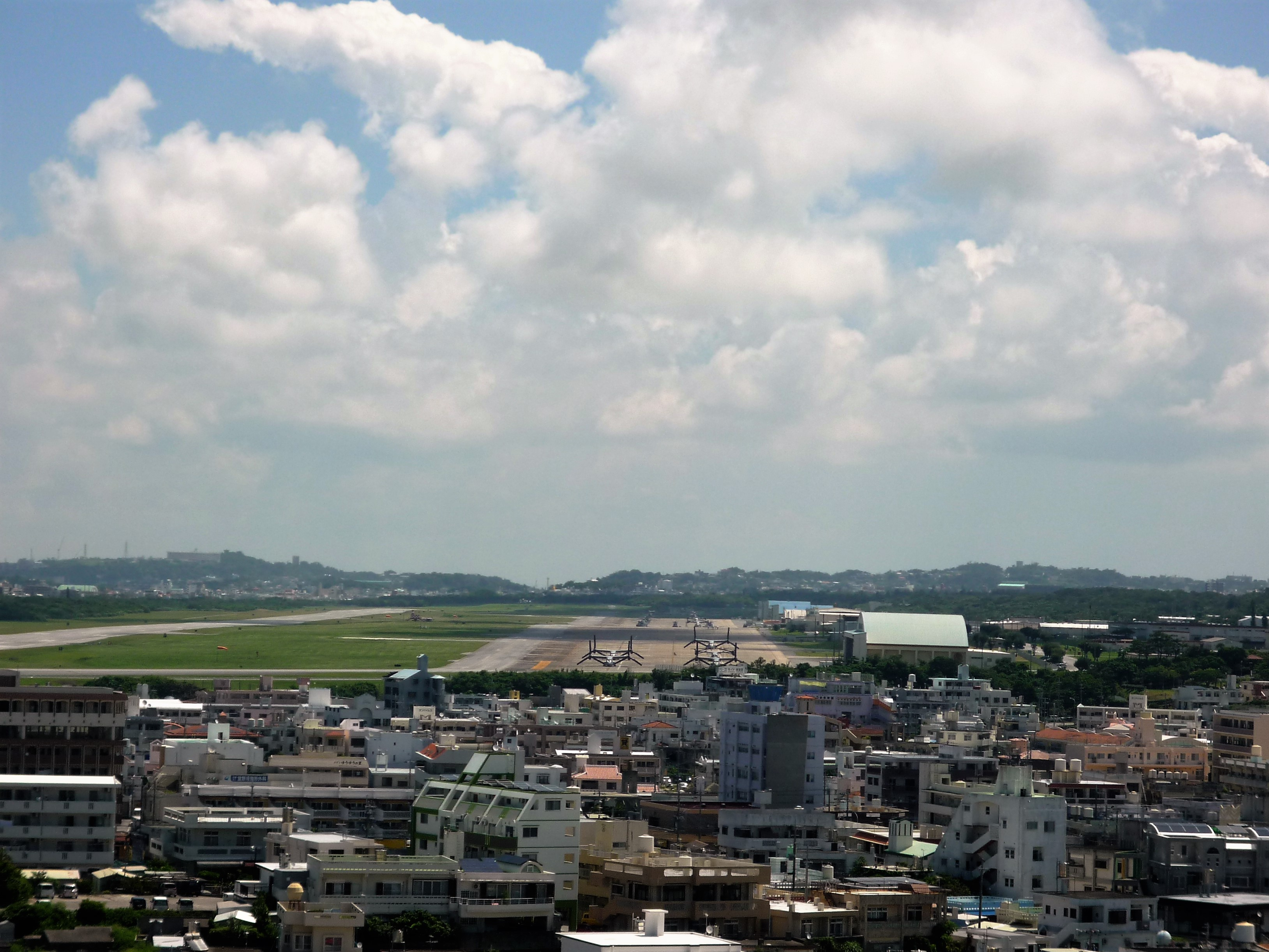
U.S. Marine Corps Air Station Futenma in 2016

=== Osprey deployment ===
In October 2012, twelve MV-22 Ospreys were transferred to Marine Corps Air Station Futenma to replace aging Vietnam-era Boeing Vertol CH-46 Sea Knight helicopters. In October 2013, an additional 12 Ospreys arrived. Japanese Defense Minister Satoshi Morimoto explained that the Osprey aircraft is safe, adding that two recent accidents were "caused by human factors". Japanese Prime Minister Yoshihiko Noda also stated that the Japanese government was convinced of the MV-22's safety. Various incidents involving V-22 Ospreys have occurred on Okinawa. On 5 April 2018, it was announced that the U.S. Air Force would officially deploy CV-22 Osprey aircraft at its Yokota Air Base.

=== Environmental concerns ===
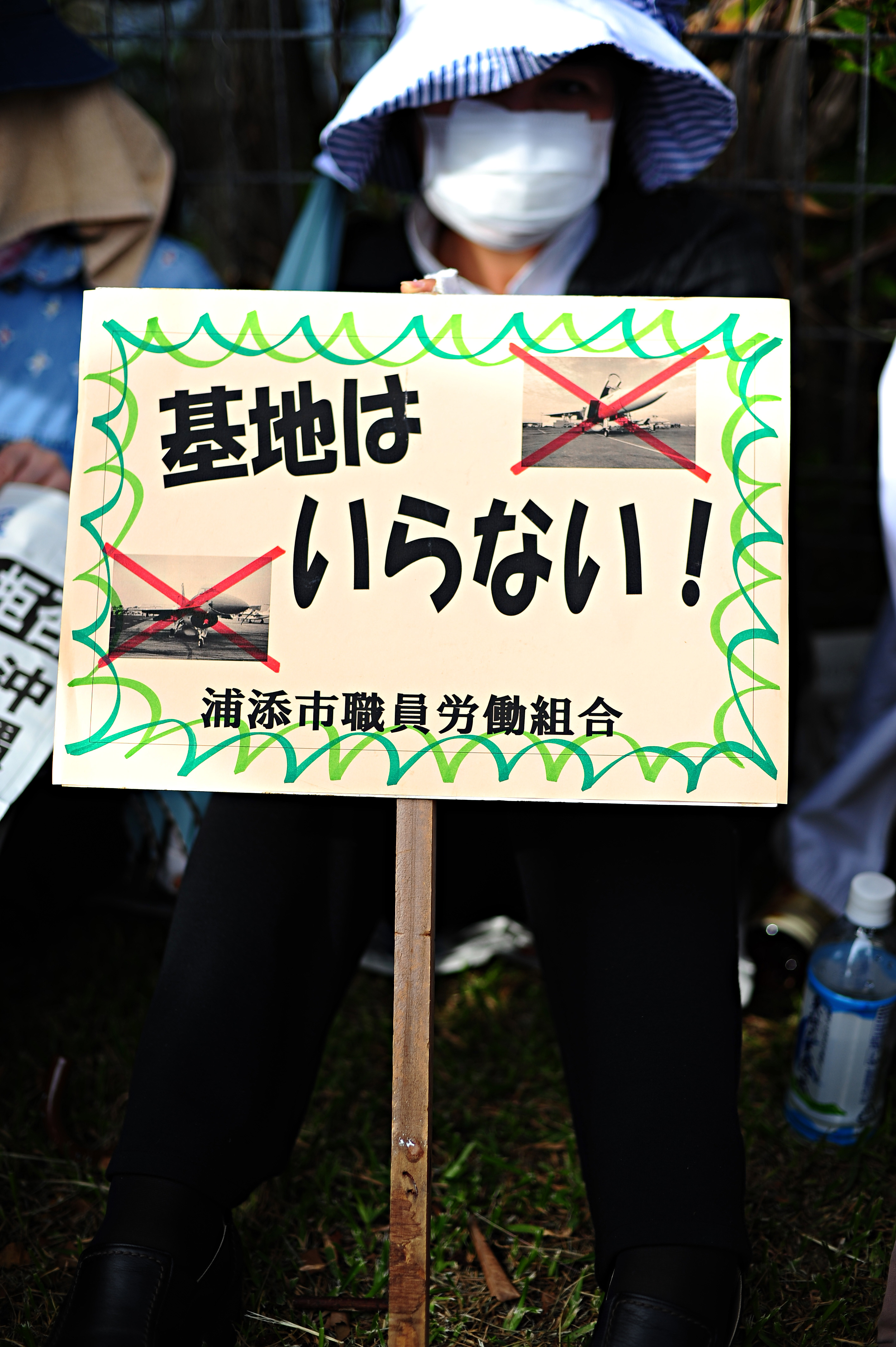
Protestor holding a "no base" sign opposing the relocation of MCAS Futenma

Environmental concerns have taken the forefront of the debate over the presence of U.S. military forces on Okinawa. Since the late 1990s, environmental concerns elevated by both local residents as well as larger Okinawan and Japanese environmental action groups and independent activists have often resulted in public protests and demonstrations against the relocation of existing U.S. military bases and the construction of replacement facilities, which have been labelled by some as examples of "modern colonialism". In particular, lingering environmental concerns over the disruption or destruction of coastal and marine habitats off the shores of Okinawa from construction, relocation and operation of U.S. military bases on Okinawa, has resulted in the protracted and continuing delayal of plans to relocate military facilities, such as Marine Corps Air Station Futenma.

==== Okinawa dugong lawsuit ====
During the late 1990s and early 2000s, initial plans to relocate Marine Corps Air Station Futenma to a new facility located offshore in Henoko Bay were met with strong resistance after sightings of dugong were reported in areas surrounding territory earmarked for the relocated airbase. A critically endangered species, dugong were traditionally fished and hunted throughout Okinawa and the Ryukyu Islands. This drew the attention of local, national and international environmental action groups, who raised concerns that land reclamation projects tied to the construction of an offshore airbase in Henoko Bay would result in the destruction of nearby dugong habitats and coastal ecosystems. Despite this, plans were set forth to continue ahead with the relocation of the base, notably, flouting the results of a 1997 referendum where the majority voted to reject a replacement facility.

In opposition to this, in September 2003, a group of Okinawan, Japanese and U.S. environmental organizations filed a lawsuit in San Francisco Federal Court to protest the relocation of Marine Corps Air Station Futenma. This lawsuit, initially entitled Okinawa Dugong v. Rumsfeld, argued that the U.S. Department of Defense failed to consider the impacts that relocating the base would have upon the local dugong population, in turn, violating the U.S. National Historic Preservation Act. This case was closed in January 2008; notably for the plaintiffs, it was ruled that the Department of Defense, by not considering the impacts of the relocated airbase upon the local dugong population, had in fact violated the National Historic Preservation Act, thus delaying the relocation of the base.

==== Water contamination ====
Concerns over water contamination have also exacerbated recent tensions surrounding the presence of U.S. military bases in Okinawa. In June 2020, following the announcement of an earlier leak of firefighting foam from Marine Corps Air Station Futenma in April 2020, a water quality study conducted by the Japanese Ministry of the Environment published findings of elevated contamination levels of PFOS and PFOA at 37 different water sources near U.S. military bases and industrial areas which exceeded provisional national targets. Further incidents concerning the release of the cancer-inducing toxins also occurred in August 2021, further worsening tensions over the presence of 'alarming' levels of these toxic chemicals.

Subsequent tests around Kadena Air Base, specifically the training site 50 meters west of Dakujaku River, confirmed severe contamination in the water system with PFAS chemicals. These chemicals reach 10s of meters underground while plumes spread for several kilometers from these contaminated training sites flowed into nearby wells and waterways of Dakujaku River and Hija River which contaminated the drinking water of 450,000 residents. These toxic chemicals originate from firefighting foams which contain PFAS and were used at training sites during the 1970s and 80s. However, the U.S. and Japanese governments say that the source of the issue cannot be confirmed.

== Facilities ==
=== List of current facilities ===
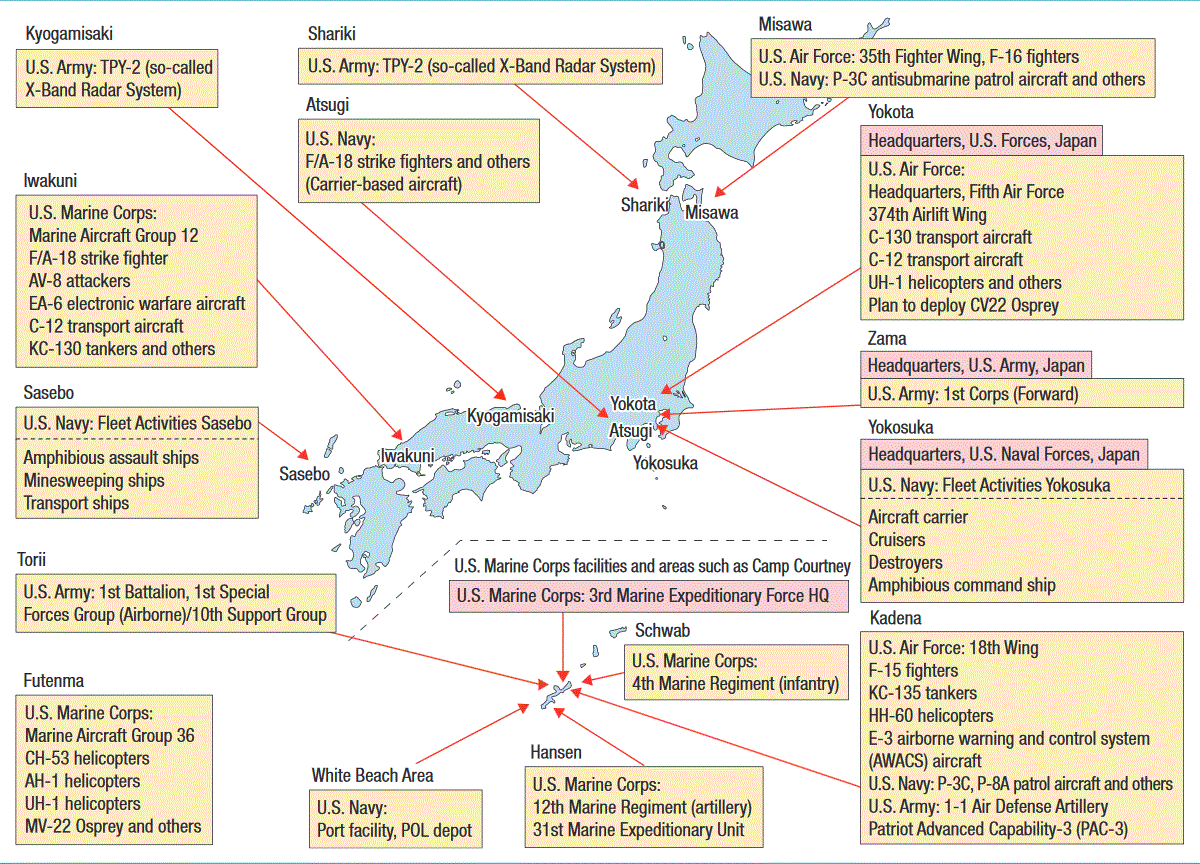
Military facilities of the United States in Japan, 2016

U.S. military bases in Japan

U.S. military facilities in Okinawa Prefecture between 1945 and 2026

The USFJ headquarters is at Yokota Air Base, about 30 km west of central Tokyo.

The U.S. military installations in Japan and their managing branches are as follows:

Branch (MilDep)	USFJ Facilities Admin Code	Name of Installation	Primary Purpose (Actual)	Location
Air Force	FAC 1054	Camp Chitose (Chitose III, Chitose Administration Annex)	Communications	Chitose, Hokkaido
Air Force	FAC 2001	Misawa Air Base	Air Base	Misawa, Aomori
Air Force	FAC 3013	Yokota Air Base	Air Base	Fussa, Tokyo
Air Force	FAC 3016	Fuchu Communications Station	Communications	Fuchu, Tokyo
Air Force	FAC 3019	Tama Service Annex (Tama Hills Recreation Center)	Recreation	Inagi, Tokyo
Air Force	FAC 3048	Camp Asaka (South Camp Drake AFN Transmitter Site)	Barracks (Broadcasting)	Wako, Saitama
Air Force	FAC 3049	Tokorozawa Communications Station (Tokorozawa Transmitter Site)	Communications	Tokorozawa, Saitama
Air Force	FAC 3056	Owada Communication Site	Communications	Niiza, Saitama
Air Force	FAC 3162	Yugi Communication Site	Communications	Hachioji, Tokyo
Air Force	FAC 4100	Sofu Communication Site	Communications	Iwakuni, Yamaguchi
Air Force	FAC 5001	Itazuke Auxiliary Airfield	Air Cargo Terminal	Hakata-ku, Fukuoka
Air Force	FAC 5073	Sefurisan Liaison Annex (Seburiyama Communications Station)	Communications	Kanzaki, Saga
Air Force	FAC 5091	Tsushima Communication Site	Communications	Tsushima, Nagasaki
Air Force	FAC 6004	Okuma Rest Center	Recreation	Kunigami, Okinawa
Air Force	FAC 6006	Yaedake Communication Site	Communications	Motobu, Okinawa
Air Force	FAC 6022	Kadena Ammunition Storage Area	Storage	Onna, Okinawa
Air Force	FAC 6037	Kadena Air Base	Air Base	Kadena, Okinawa
Air Force	FAC 6077	Tori Shima Range	Training	Kumejima, Okinawa
Air Force	FAC 6078	Idesuna Jima Range	Training	Tonaki, Okinawa
Air Force	FAC 6080	Kume Jima Range	Training	Kumejima, Okinawa
Army	FAC 2070	Shariki Communication Site	Communications	Tsugaru, Aomori
Army	FAC 3004	Akasaka Press Center (Hardy Barracks)	Office	Minato, Tokyo
Army	FAC 3067	Yokohama North Dock	Port Facility	Yokohama, Kanagawa
Army	FAC 3079	Camp Zama	Office	Zama, Kanagawa
Army	FAC 3084	Sagami General Depot	Logistics	Sagamihara, Kanagawa
Army	FAC 3102	Sagamihara Housing Area	Housing	Sagamihara, Kanagawa
Army		Kyogamisaki Communication Site	Communications	Kyōtango, Kyoto
Army	FAC 4078	Akizuki Ammunition Depot	Storage	Etajima, Hiroshima
Army	FAC 4083	Kawakami Ammunition Depot	Storage	Higashihiroshima, Hiroshima
Army	FAC 4084	Hiro Ammunition Depot	Storage	Kure, Hiroshima
Army	FAC 4152	Kure Pier No. 6	Port Facility	Kure, Hiroshima
Army	FAC 4611	Haigamine Communication Site	Communications	Kure, Hiroshima
Army	FAC 6007	Gesaji Communication Site	Communications	Higashi, Okinawa
Army	FAC 6036	Torii Communications Station (Torii Station)	Communications	Yomitan, Okinawa
Army	FAC 6064	Naha Port	Port Facility	Naha, Okinawa
Army	FAC 6076	Army POL Depots	Storage	Uruma, Okinawa
Navy	FAC 2006	Hachinohe POL Depot	Storage	Hachinohe, Aomori
Navy	FAC 2012	Misawa ATG Range (R130, Draughon Range)	Training	Misawa, Aomori
Navy	FAC 3033	Kisarazu Auxiliary Landing Field	Air Facility	Kisarazu, Chiba
Navy	FAC 3066	Negishi Dependent Housing Area (Naval Housing Annex Negishi)	Housing	Yokohama, Kanagawa
Navy	FAC 3083	Naval Air Facility Atsugi	Air Facility	Ayase, Kanagawa
Navy	FAC 3087	Ikego Housing Area and Navy Annex	Housing	Zushi, Kanagawa
Navy	FAC 3090	Azuma Storage Area	Storage	Yokosuka, Kanagawa
Navy	FAC 3096	Kamiseya Communications Station - returned to Japanese Gov 2015 (Naval Support Facility Kamiseya - returned to Japanese Gov 2015)	Communications (Housing)	Yokohama, Kanagawa
Navy	FAC 3097	Fukaya Communication Site (Naval Transmitter Station Totsuka)	Communications	Yokohama, Kanagawa
Navy	FAC 3099	United States Fleet Activities Yokosuka	Port Facility	Yokosuka, Kanagawa
Navy	FAC 3117	Urago Ammunition Depot	Storage	Yokosuka, Kanagawa
Navy	FAC 3144	Tsurumi POL Depot	Storage	Yokohama, Kanagawa
Navy	FAC 3181	Iwo Jima Communication Site	Communications (Training)	Ogasawara, Tokyo
Navy	FAC 3185	New Sanno U.S. Forces Center	Recreation	Minato, Tokyo
Navy	FAC 5029	United States Fleet Activities Sasebo	Port Facility	Sasebo, Nagasaki
Navy	FAC 5030	Sasebo Dry Dock Area	Port Facility	Sasebo, Nagasaki
Navy	FAC 5032	Akasaki POL Depot	Storage	Sasebo, Nagasaki
Navy	FAC 5033	Sasebo Ammunition Supply Point	Storage	Sasebo, Nagasaki
Navy	FAC 5036	Iorizaki POL Depot	Storage	Sasebo, Nagasaki
Navy	FAC 5039	Yokose POL Depot	Storage	Saikai, Nagasaki
Navy	FAC 5050	Harioshima Ammunition Storage Area	Storage	Sasebo, Nagasaki
Navy	FAC 5086	Tategami Basin Port Area	Port Facility	Sasebo, Nagasaki
Navy	FAC 5118	Sakibe Navy Annex	Hangar	Sasebo, Nagasaki
Navy	FAC 5119	Hario Dependent Housing Area (Hario Family Housing Area)	Housing	Sasebo, Nagasaki
Navy	FAC 6028	Tengan Pier	Port Facility	Uruma, Okinawa
Navy	FAC 6032	Camp Shields	Barracks	Okinawa, Okinawa
Navy	FAC 6046	Awase Communications Station	Communications	Okinawa, Okinawa
Navy	FAC 6048	White Beach Area	Port Facility	Uruma, Okinawa
Navy	FAC 6084	Kobi Sho Range	Training	Ishigaki, Okinawa
Navy	FAC 6085	Sekibi Sho Range	Training	Ishigaki, Okinawa
Navy	FAC 6088	Oki Daito Jima Range	Training	Kitadaito, Okinawa
Marine; Corps	FAC 3127	Camp Fuji	Barracks	Gotenba, Shizuoka
Marine; Corps	FAC 3154	Numazu Training Area	Training	Numazu, Shizuoka
Marine; Corps	FAC 4092	Marine Corps Air Station Iwakuni	Air Station	Iwakuni, Yamaguchi
Marine; Corps	FAC 6001	Northern Training Area (Incl. Camp Gonsalves)	Training	Kunigami, Okinawa
Marine; Corps	FAC 6005	Ie Jima Auxiliary Airfield	Training	Ie, Okinawa
Marine; Corps	FAC 6009	Camp Schwab	Training	Nago, Okinawa
Marine; Corps	FAC 6010	Henoko Ordnance Ammunition Depot	Storage	Nago, Okinawa
Marine; Corps	FAC 6011	Camp Hansen	Training	Kin, Okinawa
Marine; Corps	FAC 6019	Kin Red Beach Training Area	Training	Kin, Okinawa
Marine; Corps	FAC 6020	Kin Blue Beach Training Area	Training	Kin, Okinawa
Marine; Corps	FAC 6029	Camp Courtney	Barracks	Uruma, Okinawa
Marine; Corps	FAC 6031	Camp McTureous	Barracks	Uruma, Okinawa
Marine; Corps	FAC 6043	Camp Kuwae (Camp Lester)	Medical Facility	Chatan, Okinawa
Marine; Corps	FAC 6044	Camp Zukeran (Camp Foster)	Barracks	Chatan, Okinawa
Marine; Corps	FAC 6051	Marine Corps Air Station Futenma	Air Station	Ginowan, Okinawa
Marine; Corps	FAC 6056	Makiminato Service Area (Camp Kinser)	Logistics	Urasoe, Okinawa
Marine; Corps	FAC 6082	Tsuken Jima Training Area	Training	Uruma, Okinawa

- Camp Smedley D. Butler, Okinawa Prefecture, Yamaguchi Prefectures. (Although these camps are dispersed throughout Okinawa and the rest of Japan they are all under the heading of Camp Smedley D. Butler):
  - Camp McTureous, Okinawa Prefecture
  - Camp Courtney, Okinawa Prefecture
  - Camp Foster, Okinawa Prefecture
  - Camp Kinser, Okinawa Prefecture
  - Camp Hansen, Okinawa Prefecture
  - Camp Schwab, Okinawa Prefecture
  - Camp Gonsalves (Jungle Warfare Training Center), Okinawa Prefecture
  - Kin Blue Beach Training Area, Okinawa Prefecture
  - Kin Red Beach Training Area, Okinawa Prefecture
  - Higashionna Ammunition Storage Point II
  - Henoko Ordnance Ammunition Depot
- Marine Corps Air Station Futenma, Okinawa Prefecture
- Marine Corps Air Station Iwakuni
- Camp Fuji, Shizuoka Prefecture
- Numazu Training Area, Shizuoka Prefecture
- Ie Jima Auxiliary Airfield, Okinawa Prefecture
- Tsuken Jima Training Area, Okinawa Prefecture

Joint Use Facilities and Areas

Temporary use facilities and areas are as follows:

USFJ Facilities Admin Code	Name of Installation	Primary Purpose	Location
FAC 1066	Camp Higashi Chitose (JGSDF)	Training	Chitose, Hokkaido
FAC 1067	Hokkaido Chitose Maneuver Area (JGSDF)	Training	Chitose, Hokkaido
FAC 1068	Chitose Air Base (JASDF)	Air Base	Chitose, Hokkaido
FAC 1069	Betsukai Yausubetsu Large Maneuver Area (JGSDF)	Training	Betsukai, Hokkaido
FAC 1070	Camp Kushiro (JGSDF)	Barracks	Kushiro, Hokkaido
FAC 1071	Camp Shikaoi (JGSDF)	Training	Shikaoi, Hokkaido
FAC 1072	Kamifurano Medium Maneuver Area (JGSDF)	Training	Kamifurano, Hokkaido
FAC 1073	Camp Sapporo (JGSDF)	Training	Sapporo, Hokkaido
FAC 1074	Shikaoi Shikaribetsu Medium Maneuver Area (JGSDF)	Training	Shikaoi, Hokkaido
FAC 1075	Camp Obihiro (JGSDF)	Training	Obihiro, Hokkaido
FAC 1076	Asahikawa Chikabumidai Maneuver Area (JGSDF)	Training	Asahikawa, Hokkaido
FAC 1077	Camp Okadama (JGSDF)	Recreation	Sapporo, Hokkaido
FAC 1078	Nayoro Maneuver Area (JGSDF)	Training	Nayoro, Hokkaido
FAC 1079	Takikawa Maneuver Area (JGSDF)	Training	Takikawa, Hokkaido
FAC 1080	Bihoro Training Area (JGSDF)	Training	Bihoro, Hokkaido
FAC 1081	Kutchan Takamine Maneuver Area (JGSDF)	Training	Kutchan, Hokkaido
FAC 1082	Engaru Maneuver Area (JGSDF)	Training	Engaru, Hokkaido
FAC 2062	Camp Sendai (JGSDF)	Training	Sendai, Miyagi
FAC 2063	Camp Hachinohe (JGSDF)	Barracks	Hachinohe, Aomori
FAC 2064	Iwate Iwatesan Medium Maneuver Area (JGSDF)	Training	Takizawa, Iwate
FAC 2065	Taiwa Ojojihara Large Maneuver Area (JGSDF)	Training	Taiwa, Miyagi
FAC 2066	Kasuminome Airfield (JGSDF)	Airfield	Sendai, Miyagi
FAC 2067	Aomori Kotani Maneuver Area (JGSDF)	Training	Aomori, Aomori
FAC 2068	Hirosaki Maneuver Area (JGSDF)	Training	Hirosaki, Aomori
FAC 2069	Jinmachi Otakane Maneuver Area (JGSDF)	Training	Murayama, Yamagata
FAC 3104	Nagasaka Rifle Range (JGSDF)	Training	Yokosuka, Kanagawa
FAC 3183	Fuji Maneuver Area (JGSDF)	Training	Fujiyoshida, Yamanashi; Gotenba, Shizuoka
FAC 3184	Camp Takigahara (JGSDF)	Training	Gotenba, Shizuoka
FAC 3186	Takada Sekiyama Maneuver Area (JGSDF)	Training	Joetsu, Niigata
FAC 3187	Hyakuri Air Base (JASDF)	Air Base	Omitama, Ibaraki
FAC 3188	Soumagahara Maneuver Area (JGSDF)	Training	Shinto, Gunma
FAC 3189	Camp Asaka (JGSDF)	Training	Asaka, Saitama
FAC 4161	Komatsu Air Base (JASDF)	Air Base	Komatsu, Ishikawa
FAC 4162	1st Service School (JMSDF)	Training	Etajima, Hiroshima
FAC 4163	Haramura Maneuver Area (JGSDF)	Training	Higashihiroshima, Hiroshima
FAC 4164	Imazu Aibano Medium Maneuver Area (JGSDF)	Training	Takashima, Shiga
FAC 4165	Gifu Air Base (JASDF)	Recreation	Kakamigahara, Gifu
FAC 4166	Camp Itami (JGSDF)	Training	Itami, Hyogo
FAC 4167	Nihonbara Medium Maneuver Area (JGSDF)	Training	Nagi, Okayama
FAC 4168	Miho Air Base (JASDF)	Air Base	Sakaiminato, Tottori
FAC 5115	Nyutabaru Air Base (JASDF)	Air Base	Shintomi, Miyazaki
FAC 5117	Sakibe Rifle Range (JMSDF)	Training	Sasebo, Nagasaki
FAC 5120	Hijudai-Jumonjibaru Maneuver Area (JGSDF)	Training	Yufu, Oita; Beppu, Oita
FAC 5121	Tsuiki Air Base (JASDF)	Air Base	Chikujo, Fukuoka
FAC 5122	Omura Air Base (JMSDF)	Recreation	Omura, Nagasaki
FAC 5123	Oyanohara-Kirishima Maneuver Area (JGSDF)	Training	Yamato, Kumamoto; Ebino, Miyazaki
FAC 5124	Camp Kita Kumamoto (JGSDF)	Training	Kumamoto, Kumamoto
FAC 5125	Camp Kengun (JGSDF)	Training	Kumamoto, Kumamoto
FAC 6181	Ukibaru Jima Training Area	Training	Uruma, Okinawa

On Okinawa, U.S. military installations occupy about 10.4% of the total land usage. Approximately 74.7% of all the U.S. military facilities in Japan are located on the island of Okinawa.

=== List of former facilities ===
The United States has returned some facilities to Japanese control. Some are used as military bases of the JSDF; others have become civilian airports or government offices; many are factories, office buildings or residential developments in the private sector. Due to the Special Actions Committee on Okinawa, more land on Okinawa is in the process of being returned. These areas include Camp Kuwae (also known as Camp Lester), MCAS Futenma, areas within Camp Zukeran (also known as Camp Foster) located about 9,900 acres (40 km^{2}) of the Northern Training Area, Aha Training Area, Gimbaru Training Area (also known as Camp Gonsalves), a small portion of the Makiminato Service Area (also known as Camp Kinser), and Naha Port.

Army:

- Army Composite Service Group Area (later, Chinen Service Area), Nanjō, Okinawa
- Army STRATCOM Warehouse (later, Urasoe Warehouse), Urasoe, Okinawa
- Bluff Area (later, Yamate Dependent Housing Area), Yokohama, Kanagawa
- Bolo Point Auxiliary Airfield (later, Trainfire Range), Yomitan, Okinawa
- Bolo Point Army Annex, Yomitan, Okinawa
- Camp Bender, Ōta, Gunma
- Camp Boone, Ginowan, Okinawa
- Camp Burness, Chūō, Tokyo
- Camp Chickamauga, 19th Infantry, Beppu, Oita
- Camp Chigasaki, Chigasaki, Kanagawa
- Camp Chitose Annex (Chitose I, II), Chitose, Hokkaido
- Camp Coe, Yokohama, Kanagawa
- Camp Crawford, Sapporo, Hokkaido
- Camp Drake, Asaka, Saitama
- Camp Drew, Ōizumi, Gunma
- Camp Eta Jima, Etajima, Hiroshima
- Camp Fowler, Sendai, Miyagi
- Camp Fuchinobe (Office Japan, NSAPACREP), Sagamihara, Kanagawa
- Camp Hakata, Higashi-ku, Fukuoka
- Camp Hardy, Ginoza, Okinawa
- Camp Haugen, Hachinohe, Aomori
- Camp Katakai, Kujūkuri, Chiba
- Camp King (later, Omiya Ordnance Sub Depot), Omiya, Saitama
- Camp Kokura, Kitakyushu, Fukuoka
- Camp Kubasaki (later, Kubasaki School Area), [Nakagusuku, Okinawa]
- Camp Loper, Tagajō, Miyagi
- Camp McGill, Yokosuka, Kanagawa
- Camp McNair, Fujiyoshida, Yamanashi
- Camp Mercy, Ginowan, Okinawa
- Camp Moore, Kawasaki, Kanagawa
- Camp Mower 34th Infantry, Sasebo, Nagasaki
- Camp Nara, Nara, Nara
- Camp Ojima, Ōta, Gunma
- Camp Otsu, Ōtsu, Shiga
- Camp Palmer, Funabashi, Chiba
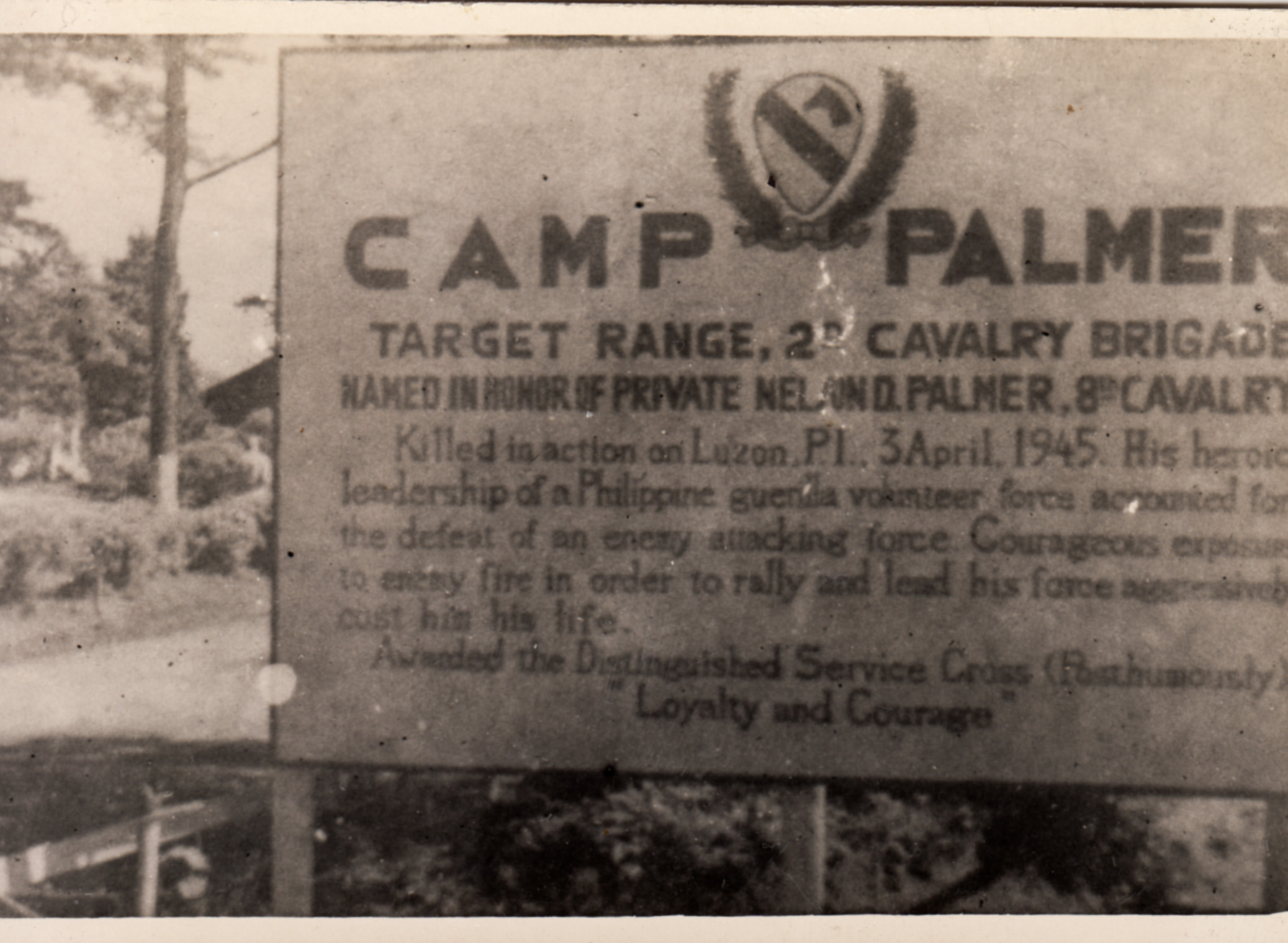
  Camp Palmer sign
- Camp Schimmelpfennig, Sendai, Miyagi
- Camp Stilwell, Maebashi, Gunma
- Camp Weir, Shinto, Gunma
- Camp Whittington, Kumagaya, Saitama
- Camp Wood, 21st Infantry, Kumamoto
- Camp Younghans, Higashine, Yamagata
- Chibana Army Annex (later, Chibana Site), Okinawa, Okinawa
- Chinen Army Annex (later, Chinen Site), Chinen, Okinawa
- Chuo Kogyo (later, Niikura Warehouse Area), Wako, Saitama
- Deputy Division Engineer Office, Urasoe, Okinawa
- Division School Center, Kokura
- Etchujima Warehouse, Koto, Tokyo
- Funaoka Ammunition Depot, Shibata, Miyagi
- Hachinohe LST Barge Landing Area, Hachinohe, Aomori
- Hakata Transportation Office, Hakata-ku, Fukuoka
- Hamby Auxiliary Airfield, Chatan, Okinawa
- Hosono Ammunition Depot, Seika, Kyoto
- Iribaru (Nishihara) Army Annex, Uruma, Okinawa
- Ishikawa Army Annex, Uruma, Okinawa
- Japan Logistical Command (Yokohama Customs House), Yokohama, Kanagawa
- Jefferson Heights, Chiyoda, Tokyo
- Kanagawa Milk Plant, Yokohama, Kanagawa
- Kashiji Army Annex, Chatan, Okinawa
- Kishine Barracks, Yokohama, Kanagawa
- Kobe Pier No. 6, Kobe, Hyogo
- Kobe Port Building, Kobe, Hyogo
- Koza Radio Relay Annex (later, Koza Communication Site), Okinawa, Okinawa
- Kure Barge Landing Area, Kure, Hiroshima
- Lincoln Center, Chiyoda, Tokyo
- Moji Port, Kitakyushu, Fukuoka
- Nagoya Procurement (Purchasing and Contracting) Office, Nagoya, Aichi
- Naha Army Annex (later, Naha Site), Naha, Okinawa
- Naha Service Center, Naha, Okinawa
- Namihira Army Annex, Yomitan, Okinawa
- Negishi Racetrack Area, Yokohama, Kanagawa
- Okinawa Regional Exchange Cold Storage (later, Naha Cold Storage), Naha, Okinawa
- Okinawa Regional Exchange Dry Storage Warehouse (later, Makiminato Warehouse), Urasoe, Okinawa
- Onna Point Army Annex (later, Onna Site), Onna, Okinawa
- Oppama Ordnance Depot, Yokosuka, Kanagawa
- Ota Koizumi Airfield (Patton Field Air Drop Range), Oizumi, Gunma
- Palace Heights, Chiyoda, Tokyo
- Pershing Heights (Headquarters, U.S. Far East Command/United Nations Command), Shinjuku, Tokyo
- Sakuradani Rifle Range, Chikushino, Fukuoka
- Sanno Hotel Officer's Quarter, Chiyoda, Tokyo
- Shikotsuko Training Area, Chitose, Hokkaido
- Shinzato Communication Site, Nanjo, Okinawa
- South Ammunition Storage Annex (later, South Ammunition Storage Area), Yaese, Okinawa
- Sunabe Army Annex, Chatan, Okinawa
- Tana Ammunition Depot, Yokohama, Kanagawa
- Tairagawa (Deragawa) Communication Site, Uruma, Okinawa
- Tengan Communication Site, Uruma, Okinawa
- Tokyo Army Hospital, Chūō, Tokyo
- Tokyo Quartermaster Depot, Minato, Tokyo
- Tokyo Ordnance Depot (later, Camp Oji), Kita, Tokyo
- U.S. Army Medical Center, Sagamihara, Kanagawa
- U.S. Army Printing and Publication Center, Far East, Kawasaki, Kanagawa
- U.S. Army Procurement Agency, Japan, Yokohama, Kanagawa
- Yokohama Center Pier (MSTS-FE), Yokohama, Kanagawa
- Yokohama Engineering Depot, Yokohama, Kanagawa
- Yokohama Motor Command, Yokohama, Kanagawa
- Yokohama Ordnance Depot, Yokohama, Kanagawa
- Yokohama POL Depot, Yokohama, Kanagawa
- Yokohama Servicemen Club, Yokohama, Kanagawa
- Yokohama Signal Supply Depot, Kawasaki, Kanagawa
- Yokohama Signal Maintenance Depot (JLC Air Strip), Yokohama, Kanagawa
- Yokohama South Pier, Yokohama, Kanagawa
- Yomitan Army Annex, Yomitan, Okinawa
- Zama Rifle Range, Sagamihara, Kanagawa
- Zukeran Propagation Annex (later, Communication Site), Chatan, Okinawa

Navy:

- Haiki (Sasebo) Rifle Range, Sasebo, Nagasaki
- Inanba Shima Gunnery Firing Range, Mikurajima, Tokyo
- Kinugasa Ammunition Depot, Yokosuka, Kanagawa
- Koshiba POL Depot, Yokohama, Kanagawa
- Ominato Communication Site, Ominato, Aomori
- Omura Rifle Range, Omura, Nagasaki
- Makiminato Service Area Annex, Urasoe, Okinawa
- Minamitorishima Communication Site, Ogasawara, Tokyo
- Nagahama Rifle Range, Kure, Hiroshima
- Nagai Dependent Housing Area (Admiralty Heights), Yokosuka, Kanagawa
- Nagiridani Dependent Housing Area, Sasebo, Nagasaki
- Naval Air Facility Naha, Naha, Okinawa
- Naval Air Facility Oppama, Yokosuka, Kanagawa
- Navy EM Club, Yokosuka, Yokosuka, Kanagawa
- Niigata Sekiya Communication Site, Chuo-ku, Niigata
- Shinyamashita Dependent Housing Area (Bayside Court), Yokohama, Kanagawa
- Sobe Communication Site (NSGA Hanza), Yomitan, Okinawa
- Tokachibuto Communication Site, Urahoro, Hokkaido
- Tomioka Storage Area, Yokohama, Kanagawa
- Tsujido Maneuver Area, Chigasaki, Kanagawa
- Yokohama Bakery, Yokohama, Kanagawa
- Yokohama Beach (Honmoku) Dependent Housing Area, Yokohama, Kanagawa
- Yokohama Chapel Center, Yokohama, Kanagawa
- Yokohama Cold Storage, Yokohama, Kanagawa
- Yokosuka Naval Pier, Yokosuka, Kanagawa
- Yosami Communication Site, Kariya, Aichi

Air Force:

- Ashiya Air Base (later, ATG Range), Ashiya, Fukuoka
- Asoiwayama Liaison Annex, Tobetsu, Hokkaido
- Brady Air Base (later, Gannosu Air Station), Higashi-ku, Fukuoka
- Chiran Communication Site, Chiran, Kagoshima
- Chitose Air Base, Chitose, Hokkaido
- Daikanyama Communication Site, Yugawara, Kanagawa
- Fuchu Air Station (Headquarters, USFJ/Fifth Air Force, 1957–1974), Fuchu, Tokyo
- Funabashi Communication Site, Funabashi, Chiba
- Grant Heights Dependent Housing Area, Nerima, Tokyo
- Green Park Housing Annex, Musashino, Tokyo
- Hachinohe Small Arms Range, Hachinohe, Aomori
- Hamura School Annex, Hamura, Tokyo
- Haneda Air Base (later, Postal Service Annex), Ota, Tokyo
- Hanshin Auxiliary Airfield, Yao, Osaka
- Hirao Communication Site, Chuo-ku, Fukuoka
- Itami Air Base, Itami, Hyogo
- Itazuke Administration Annex (Kasugabaru DHA), Kasuga, Fukuoka
- Itazuke Air Base, Hakata-ku, Fukuoka
- Johnson Air Base (later, Air Station, Family Housing Annex), Iruma, Saitama
- Kadena Dependent Housing Area, Yomitan, Okinawa
- Kanto Mura Dependent Housing Area and Auxiliary Airfield, Chofu, Tokyo
- Kasatoriyama Radar Site, Tsu, Mie
- Kashiwa Communication Site (Camp Tomlinson), Kashiwa, Chiba
- Komaki (Nagoya) Air Base, Komaki, Aichi
- Kozoji Ammunition Depot, Kasugai, Aichi
- Kume Jima Air Station, Kumejima, Okinawa
- Kushimoto Radar Site, Kushimoto, Wakayama
- Miho Air Base, Sakaiminato, Tottori
- Mineoka Liaison Annex, Minamiboso, Chiba
- Mito ATG Range, Hitachinaka, Ibaraki
- Miyako Jima Air Station, Miyakojima, Okinawa
- Miyako Jima VORTAC Site, Miyakojima, Okinawa
- Moriyama Air Station, Nagoya, Aichi
- Naha Air Base, Naha, Okinawa
- Naha Air Force/Navy Annex, Naha, Okinawa
- Najima Warehouse Area, Higashi-ku, Fukuoka
- Niigata Air Base, Niigata, Niigata
- Ofuna Warehouse, Yokohama, Kanagawa
- Oshima Communication Center, Oshima, Tokyo
- Rokko Communication Site, Kobe, Hyogo
- Senaha Communications Station, Yomitan, Okinawa (returned to the Japanese government in September 2006)
- Sendai Kunimi Communication Site, Sendai, Miyagi
- Showa (later, Akishima) Dependent Housing Area, Akishima, Tokyo
- Shiroi Air Base, Kashiwa, Chiba
- Sunabe Warehouse, Chatan, Okinawa
- Tachikawa Air Base, Tachikawa, Tokyo
- Tokyo Communication Site (NTTPC Central Telephone Exchange), Chūō, Tokyo
- Wajima Liaison Annex, Wajima, Ishikawa
- Wajiro Water Supply Site, Higashi-ku, Fukuoka
- Wakkanai Air Station, Wakkanai, Hokkaido
- Washington Heights Dependent Housing Area, Shibuya, Tokyo
- Yamada Ammunition Depot, Kitakyushu, Fukuoka
- Yokawame Communication Site, Misawa, Aomori
- Yozadake Air Station, Itoman, Okinawa

Marines:

- Aha Training Area, Kunigami, Okinawa
- Camp Gifu, Kakamigahara, Gifu
- Camp Hauge, Uruma, Okinawa
- Camp Okubo, Uji, Kyoto
- Camp Shinodayama, Izumi, Osaka
- Gimbaru Training Area, Kin, Okinawa
- Ihajo Kanko Hotel, Uruma, Okinawa
- Makiminato Housing Area, Naha, Okinawa
- Onna Communication Site, Onna, Okinawa
- Awase Golf Course, Okinawa Prefecture (returned to the Japanese government in April 2010)
- Yaka Rest Center, Kin, Okinawa
- Yomitan Auxiliary Airfield, Yomitan, Okinawa (returned to the Japanese government in 2006, parachute drop training ended in March 2001)

== See also ==
- United States Military Government of the Ryukyu Islands
- United States Civil Administration of the Ryukyu Islands
