= Hagushi =

Human settlement in Japan

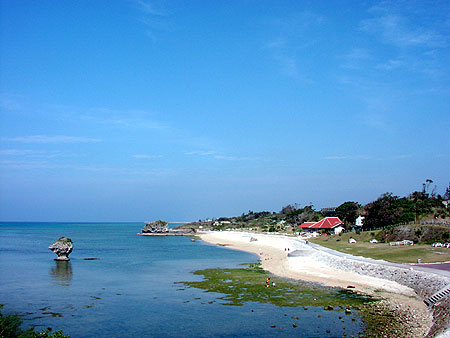

- Location within Japan
- Location: Yomitan, Okinawa
- Coordinates: 26°21′47″N 127°44′21″E
- River sources: Hija River
- Primary outflows: Toguchi Beach

Hagushi bay is located in Yomitan, Okinawa. The bay is at the mouth of Hija River. The north side of the mouth of the river has a public beach called Toguchi Beach.

== World War II ==
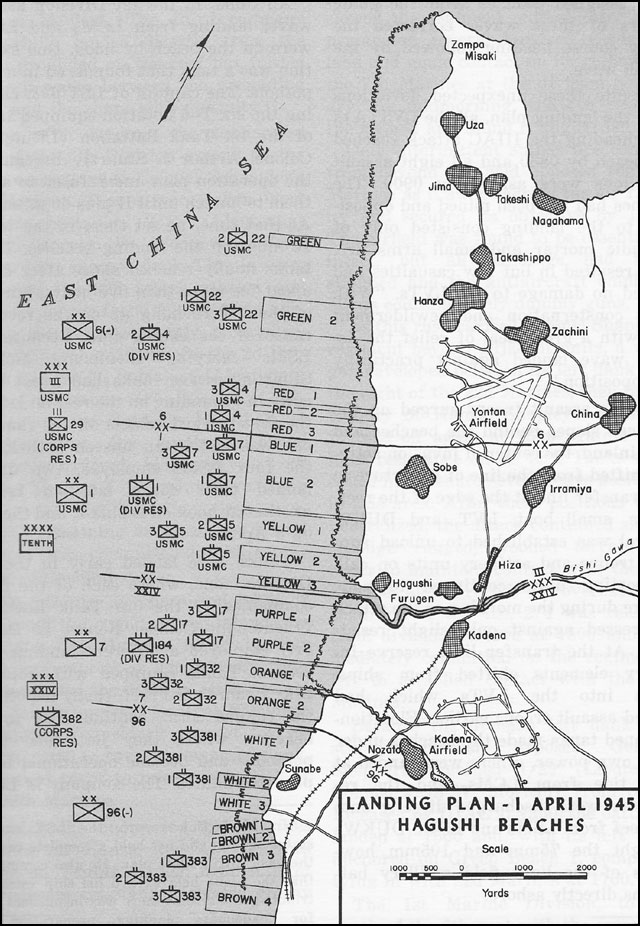
Hagushi landing

Hagushi bay was the primary unloading point for American supplies during the invasion of Okinawa during World War II. The bay, at the mouth of the Bishi River (now called Hija River), was the dividing line between the First and Sixth US Marine divisions, which landed on the Hagushi beaches to the north, and the Seventh and Ninety-sixth Infantry Divisions of the US Army which landed south of the river's mouth. In the seven-day campaign of aerial and naval bombardment which preceded the 1 April 1945 landings, Japanese beach defenses and shipping at the Bishi River's mouth were heavily bombarded, and US Navy frogmen swept the Hagushi beaches of thousands of landmines and nearly 3000 wooden posts. The beach landings were unopposed by the Imperial Japanese Army aside from scattered artillery and sniper fire, and by nightfall on 1 April 1945, 60,000 American troops were ashore.

== See also ==
- SS Minot Victory
