= Tsutomu Aragaki =

Japanese tenor (born 1952)

Tsutomu Aragaki (新垣 勉, Aragaki Tsutomu; born 1952 in Yomitan, Okinawa Prefecture) is a Japanese tenor.

He was born in Yomitan, Okinawa Prefecture. He was blinded shortly after birth when a midwife put overly-strong drops in his eyes. When he was a year old, his parents divorced and his Mexican-American father went back to the United States. His mother, who was Okinawan, remarried when he was still a child, and Tsutomu was sent to live with his maternal grandmother. His grandmother raised him until he was 14, when she died, leaving him without relatives in Japan. One day Tsutomu heard a hymn on the radio. This led him to visit a church, where he told the minister about his life. Sympathetic to Tsutomu's loss, the minister took him in and raised him as family. It was this meeting that led Tsutomu both to sing and to become a Baptist minister. The song, "Sugar Cane Field", was top three in classical CD sales in Japan in 2002.

The Fuji TV movie Mada Minu Chichi e, Haha e [まだ見ぬ父へ母へ] (To the Father and Mother I Still Haven't Seen) is a dramatization of his life.
