= 1998 Eskridge car crash =

Fatal hit-and-run in Okinawa caused by an intoxicated U.S. Marine

The 1998 Eskridge car crash was a hit-and-run that occurred in Okinawa, Japan, on October 7, 1998. Randall Eskridge, a member of the United States Marine Corps, was drunk driving when he struck Yuki Uema, an 18-year-old Okinawan student. Eskridge failed to stop and help Uema, who entered a coma and died a week later from a brain contusion. Uema's death caused an uproar in Okinawa due to the raw emotion after the 1995 Okinawan rape incident, the fact the Marines refused to hand over Eskridge, and continued opposition to the U.S. military presence in Japan.

== Crash ==
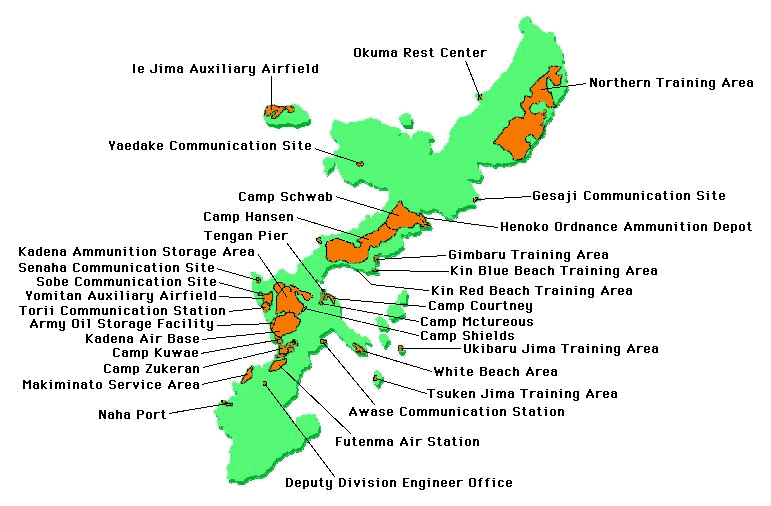
Map of United States military facilities on Okinawa Island and other outlying islands. Between 50 and 75 percent of the 47,000 US troops based in Japan live on the island of Okinawa in bases that take up one fifth of the island.

At 4:30 AM on October 7, 1998, Yuki Uema, an 18-year-old Okinawan high school student, was riding her motorcycle home on Okinawa Island when she was knocked down by a hit-and-run driver outside Camp Zukeran, a base of the United States military north of Naha, the capital of Okinawa Prefecture. Randall Eskridge, a 23-year-old corporal of the United States Marine serving as a Flight Equipment Technician with the Marine Aerial Refueler Transport Squadron 152, was identified as the driver that struck Uema after a guard at Camp Zukeran's gate noticed heavy damage to the grille of his vehicle. Initially, the US military refused to hand over Eskridge to Japanese civil authorities as the Status of Forces Agreement (SOFA) agreement between Japan and the United States requires the accused to be handed over to local authorities only for a heinous crime. The refusal sparked outrage and protests among Okinawa's populace, but Eskridge was finally handed over to the local police a week after the incident. Around this time, Uema died from a brain contusion caused by complications from her injuries sustained in the incident, after having spent the week in a coma.

== Trial ==
During Eskridge's trial, the prosecution said that he had committed a "malicious crime due to his low regard for human life," seriously injuring Yuki Uema while driving under the influence of alcohol. Eskridge was tried on charges of drunken driving, leaving the scene of a crash and professional negligence to cause injury. Even though Eskridge admitted his wrongdoing, the prosecutor told the court that the accused deserved a stiff penalty. In 1999, Eskridge was sentenced to 20 months in an Okinawa jail.

== Aftermath ==
The incident brought to light one of many grievances felt by the people of Okinawa towards the US military presence, to which opposition was becoming increasingly popular and vocal since the 1995 Okinawan rape incident, where three US servicemen rented a van then kidnapped and raped a 12-year-old Japanese girl. After the 1996 Padilla car crash in particular, which involved a US serviceman and Japanese victims, it was revealed that there were over a thousand car crashes a year in Okinawa involving US military personnel. Chalmers Johnson stated that it was not until 1997 that American military-owned vehicles were required to have license plates, often making it impossible for hit-and-run victims to identify the vehicle that hit them.

== See also ==
- 1996 Padilla car crash

== Bibliography ==
Notes

References

- Johnson, Chalmers (2001). Blowback: The Costs and Consequences of American Empire (2001 ed.). Macmillan. ISBN 9781429928113. - Total pages: 288
