= 1996 Padilla car crash =

Fatal crash in Okinawa caused by a speeding U.S. serviceman

Coordinates: 26.2956°N 127.7610°E

The 1996 Padilla car crash occurred in Okinawa, Japan, on 7 January 1996. Lori Padilla, a member of the United States Marine Corps in Okinawa, was speeding in a car which swerved off the road, killing Rojita Kinjo and her young daughters Mitsuko and Mariko. The crash sparked outrage in Okinawa and strengthened opposition to the U.S. military presence in Japan, which was already facing scrutiny over the 1995 Okinawan rape incident that occurred only a few months earlier.

== Crash ==
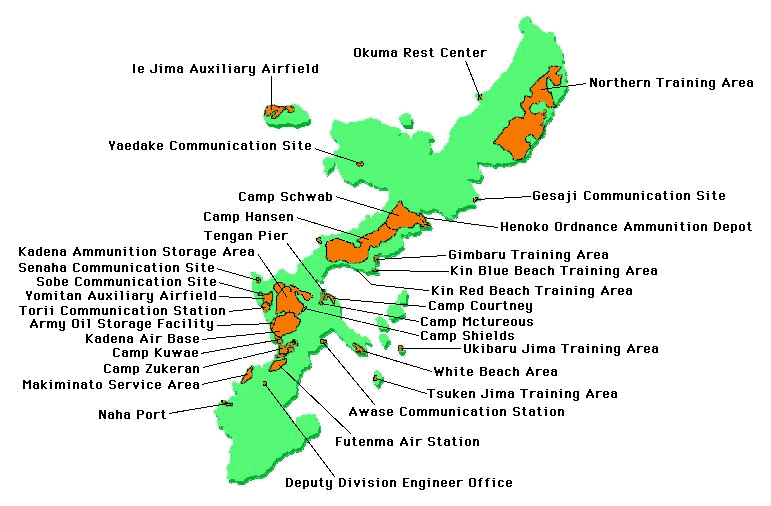
US Military Facilities in Okinawa. Between 50 and 75 per-cent of the 47,000 US troops based in Japan live on the island of Okinawa in bases that take up one fifth of the island.

At around 1 p.m. on Sunday, January 7, 1996, a car driven by Lori Padilla, a 20-year-old Lance Corporal of the United States Marine Corps stationed in Okinawa as part of the United States Forces Japan, crashed at the Kitamae gate to Camp Foster on Route 58, located on Okinawa Island in Japan. The car struck and killed Rojita Kinjo, a 36-year-old Japanese civilian, and her two young daughters, 10-year-old Mitsuko and 1-year-old Mariko. Padilla and passenger Carrie Smith, a 21-year-old Private First Class in the US Marines, were slightly injured and taken to a United States Navy hospital.

Okinawa police stated that Padilla had abruptly changed lanes and lost control of her car because she was driving too fast. The US military was criticized for refusing requests by the Japanese authorities for access to Padilla or to administer a breathalyzer test, as standard Japanese procedure calls for alcohol testing to rule out drunk driving as the cause of the crash. The incident brought to light one of many grievances felt by the people of Okinawa towards the US military presence on the island chain, and after the Padilla crash it was revealed that over a thousand car crashes involving US military personnel occurred in Okinawa per year. From 1997, US soldiers were required to have two forms of car insurance, the Japanese Compulsory Insurance and an additional comprehensive insurance.

== Trial ==
Padilla was eventually given a two-year jail sentence by a Japanese court, and the Kinjo family sued Padilla and the co-owner of the car for ¥62 million (US$580,000 in 1996, US$1,190,643 in 2025) solatium or blood money. The court ruled that the defendants should pay the money, but had already left Japan and Padilla had no money or insurance. The American government eventually paid 25 million yen and the Japanese government paid the difference.

== Aftermath ==
The Padilla crash was the second of three notorious events of misconduct by United States servicemen in Okinawa during the mid-to-late 1990s which strengthened opposition to American military presence in Japan. The crash occurred only four months after the 1995 Okinawa rape incident, where two US Marines and a US Navy Seaman stationed at Camp Hansen rented a van then kidnapped and raped a 12-year-old Japanese girl in Okinawa, sparking significant outrage among the populace. Two years after the Padilla crash, the 1998 Eskridge car crash occurred. In this case, a drunk US Marine struck a Japanese teenager who died a week later from her injuries.

== See also ==
- 1998 Eskridge car crash
