= Tokushin Yamauchi =

Japanese politician (1935–2026)

- 山内 徳信
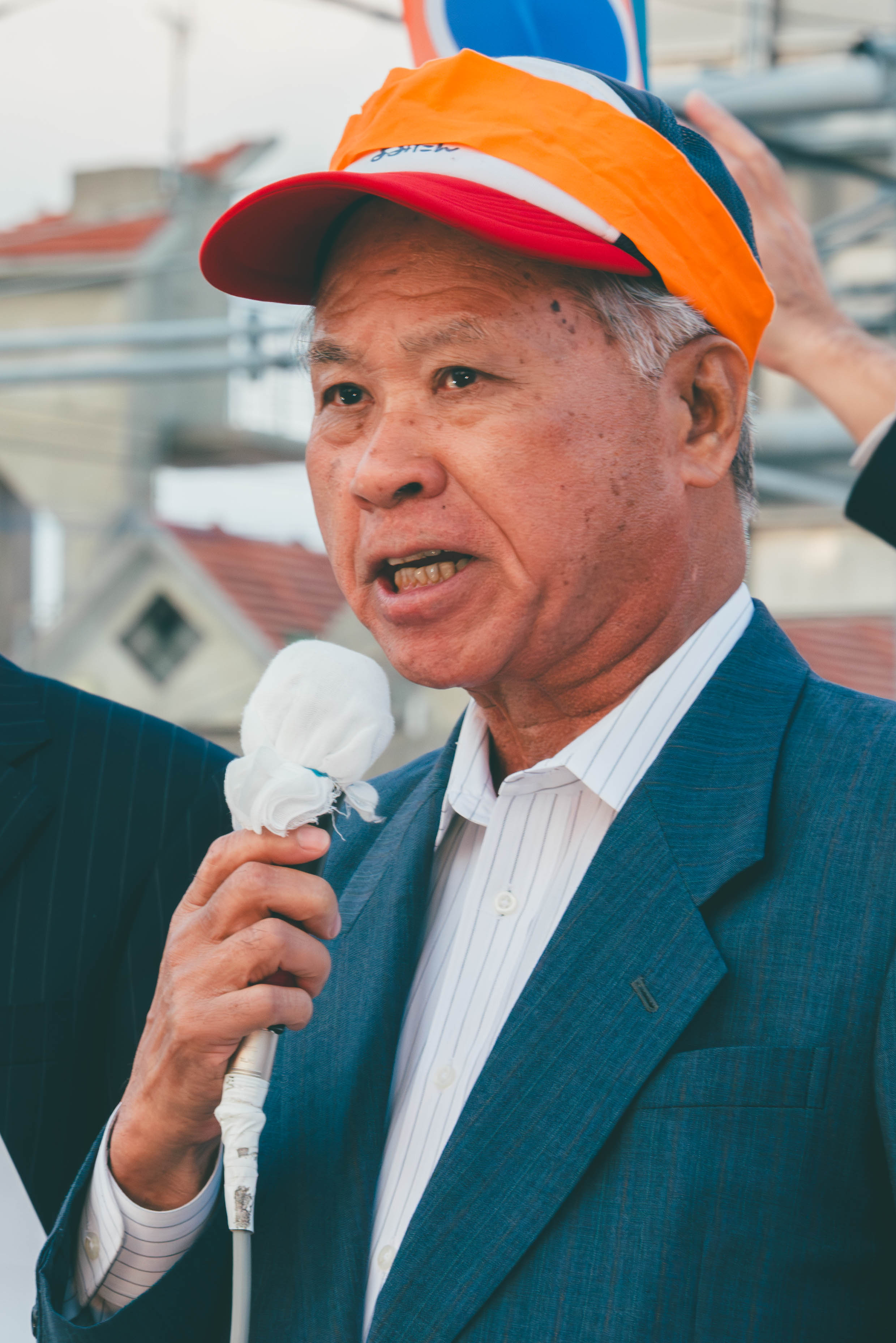
- Yamauchi in 2014

Member of the House of Councillors
- In office 29 July 2007 – 28 July 2013
- Constituency: National PR

Mayor of Yomitan
- In office 1974–1998

Personal details
- Born: 15 February 1935 Yomitan, Okinawa, Japan
- Died: 26 September 2026 (aged 91) Yomitan, Okinawa, Japan
- Party: Social Democratic
- Education: University of the Ryukyus

Tokushin Yamauchi (山内 徳信, Yamauchi Tokushin; 15 February 1935 – 26 September 2026) was a Japanese politician of the Social Democratic Party, a member of the House of Councillors in the Diet (national legislature). A native of Yomitan, Okinawa and 1958 graduate of Ryukyu University, he was elected to the House of Councillors for the first time in 2007 after serving as mayor of Yomitan for six terms (24 years). Yamauchi died on 26 September 2026, aged 91.
