= Momenbaru Site =

- 木綿原遺跡 (Japanese)
- Momenbaru Site Momenbaru Site (Japan)
- Interactive map of Momenbaru Site
- 26°22′12″N 127°44′06″E
- Type: midden, cemetery
- Periods: Shellmidden Period
- Location: Yomitan, Okinawa, Japan

Site notes
- Public access: Yes (no facilities)

Momenbaru Site (木綿原遺跡, Momenbaru iseki) is an archaeological site with a middle period Okinawan Shellmidden Period settlement located in the Toguchi neighborhood of the village of Yomitan, Okinawa Prefecture, Japan. It was designated as a National Historic Site in 1978. it was the first place in Okinawa where prehistoric box-shaped stone cist tombs were discovered.

== Overview ==
The Momenbaru Site is situated on a coastal sand dune overlooking the East China Sea in the central part of Okinawa Island. It is primarily is a burial site dating from the early to late periods of the Okinawan Shellmidden Period (corresponding to the Yayoi period in mainland Japan). Seven box-shaped stone cist tombs and 17 sets human remains have been discovered. Stone cist tombs are constructed by combining stone slabs and covering them with a capstone, while stone-enclosed tombs are burial pits filled with pebbles, and unlike stone cist tombs, they do not have small stones or capstones. The stone cist tombs are constructed using coral and beach rock, measuring 173 to 182 centimeters in length, 34 to 51 centimeters in width, and 35 to 41 centimeters in height. Most of the tombs are accompanied by a covering stone (a mound of pebbles or coral piled up as a marker on the ground surface of the tomb), and only Tomb 5 does not have a covering stone. Tombs 2 and 3 have coral gravel burial beds. Tombs 3 through 7 each contain one body, but Tombs 1 and 2 are divided into upper and lower sections, indicating that secondary burials were performed . A total of thirteen individual human remain were identified from four of the stone cist tombs, with a total of three individuals buried in layers in the first box-shaped stone cist tomb. Of these, only one individual from the middle layer was well-preserved, showing a prone, extended burial position, with two clam shells at the feet and the top of a conch shell placed on the forehead. In addition two pit burials, and three additional human remains where burial facilities could not be confirmed were unearthed. Eight of the remains were determined to be male, five female, two of children and two of unknown gender. Four of the remains showed evidence of tooth ablation.

The upper layer of the graves included earthenware vessels and shell jewelry as grave goods, and a Yayoi pottery jar and a polished stone axe were found adjacent to the outside of the stone cist. The shell artifacts included shell bracelets made from Turbo marmoratus, Strombus luhuanus, Patella vulgata, and Trochus niloticus, as well as perforated shell artifacts made from Conus, Cypraea, and Patella vulgata. In some cases, shells were placed on the face and chest of the deceased. In one case the body was buried in a prone extended position, a Trochus niloticus shell was placed on the forehead, and Tridacna gigas shells were placed on both feet. A shell midden has also been confirmed in the hinterland about 40 meters south from the burial site .

== See also ==
- List of Historic Sites of Japan (Okinawa)
