= Kadena, Okinawa =

Kadena Kadina 嘉手納町
- Town
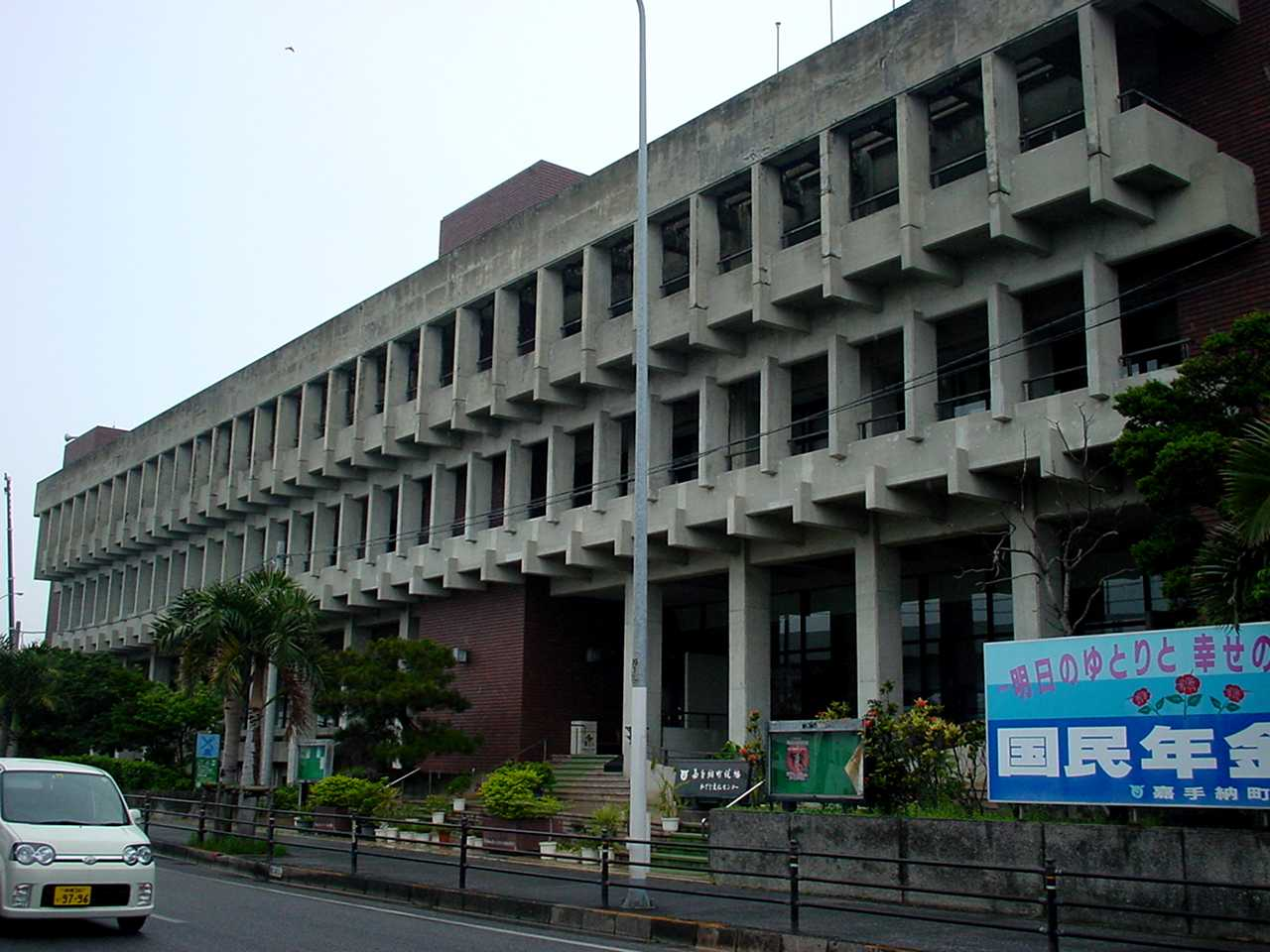
- Kadena Town Hall

- Flag Seal

- Location of Kadena in Okinawa Prefecture

- Coordinates: 26°21′42″N 127°45′19″E
- Country: Japan
- Region: Kyushu
- Prefecture: Okinawa Prefecture
- District: Nakagami

Government
  - Mayor: Hiroshi Toyama

Area
  - Total: 15.04 km^{2} (5.81 sq mi)

Dimensions
  - Length: 8 km (5.0 mi)
  - Width: 5 km (3.1 mi)

Population (October 2016)
  - Total: 13,671
  - Density: 909.0/km^{2} (2,354/sq mi)
- Time zone: UTC+9 (Japan Standard Time)
- Tree: Kuroki Ebenales
- Flower: Hibiscus
- Address: 588 Kadena, Kadena-chō, Nakagami-gun, Okinawa; 904-0293
- Website: www.town.kadena.okinawa.jp

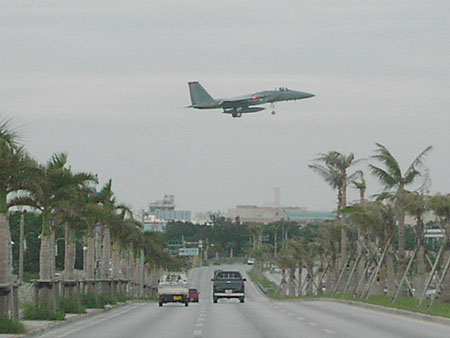
Japan National Route 58 at Kadena

Kadena (嘉手納町, Kadena-chō; Okinawan: Kadina) is a town located in Nakagami District, Okinawa Prefecture, Japan.

As of October 2016, the town had an estimated population of 13,671 and a density of 910 persons per km^{2}. The total area is 15.04 square kilometres (5.81 mi^{2}). Approximately 85% of the town is controlled by the US Government including Kadena Air Base, the second-largest base in the United States Air Force.

== Geography ==
Kadena faces the East China Sea to the west.

=== Administrative divisions ===
The town includes eight wards.

- Kadena (嘉手納)
- Kaneku (兼久)
- Kudoku (久得)
- Kuninao (国直)
- Mizugama (水釜)
- Noguni (野国)
- Nozato (野里)
- Yara (屋良)

=== Neighboring municipalities ===
Kadena borders three other municipalities in Okinawa Prefecture.

- Chatan to the south
- Okinawa to the east
- Yomitan to the north

== History ==
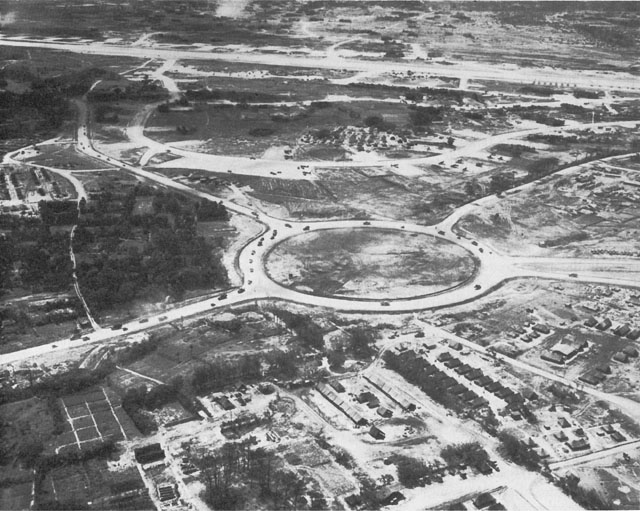
Kadena Circle in 1945

The Kadena area has some of the oldest settlement remains, in the form of shell mounds, on Okinawa Island. The Hija River, the modern border between Yomitan and Kadena, was the focus of these early settlements. A number of ruins of minor gusuku (castles and forts) can be found in the area. Amawari, an infamous warlord, was born in the Kadena area while it was still part of Chatan. Japan annexed the island in 1879, and Chatan became a village in 1908. During the Pacific War, Japan built an airstrip in the Kadena area. During the Battle of Okinawa in 1945, the United States landed on the banks of the Hija River and captured the airstrip. The airstrip became Kadena Air Force Base. On December 4, 1948, the American military government separated Kadena from Chatan and established Kadena village. The United States built Kadena Circle outside the base. On January 1, 1976, four years after Okinawa reverted to Japanese control, Kadena was elevated to town status.

== Economy ==
The economy of Kadena is largely dependent on the presence of Kadena Air Force Base. The town otherwise produces a small amount of pineapples and sugarcane.

== Education ==
Municipal schools include:

- Kadena Elementary School (嘉手納小学校)
- Kadena Junior High School (嘉手納中学校)
- Yara Elementary School (屋良小学校)

The Okinawa Prefectural Board of Education operates Okinawa Prefectural Kadena High School.

The DoDEA operates schools on Kadena AB for dependents of American employees, although several schools are not in Kadena Town.

== Cultural Properties ==
- Name (Japanese) (Type of registration)

=== Cultural Properties ===
- Hija River Estuary Southern Hill Site (比謝川口南丘陵遺跡) (Municipal)
- Kadena Gusuku (嘉手納グスク) (Municipal)
- Kadena Shell Mound (嘉手納貝塚) (Municipal)

=== Historic Sites ===
- Amagā-bira Hill paved road (天川坂)
- Hija Bridge (比謝橋)
- Noguni Shell Mound Cluster (野国貝塚群) (Prefectural)
- Noguni Sōkan's Shrine (野國總管宮)
- Noguni Sōkan's Tomb (野国総官の墓) (Prefectural)
- Yara Castle Site (屋良城跡 (大川城))
- Yara Muruchi (Sacred) Pond (屋良ムルチ)

=== Natural Monuments ===
- Large banyan tree of Kadena Uganju Praying Site (字嘉手納拝所の大ガジュマル) (Municipal)
- Large Deigo tree of Kadena Elementary School (嘉手納小学校の大デイゴ) (Municipal)
- Large Deigo tree of the Shimabukuro Family tomb (島袋家基地の大デイゴ) (Municipal)
