= Hija River =

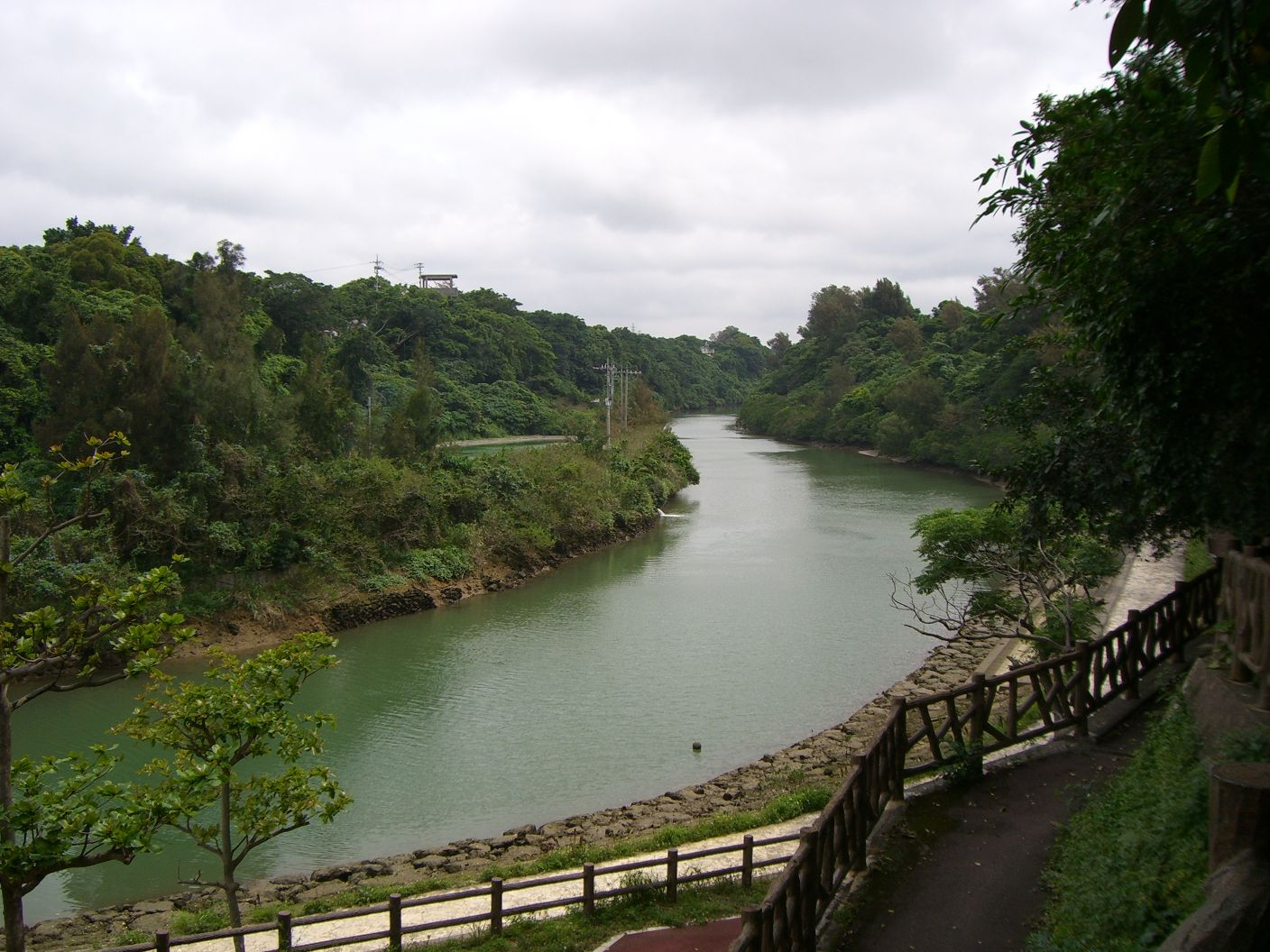
- The Hija River in Kadena
- Native name: 比謝川 (Japanese)

Location
- Country: Japan
- Prefecture: Okinawa Prefecture

Physical characteristics
- Source
  - location: Okinawa City, Okinawa
- Mouth: East China Sea
  - coordinates: 26°21′46″N 127°44′27″E
- Length: 15.4 km (9.6 mi)
- Basin size: 50.4 km^{2} (19.5 sq mi)

Basin features
- Tributaries
  - right: Kahunja River, Yonabaru River, Nagata River

The Hija River (Japanese: 比謝川; Hijagawa) is the largest river on the Japanese island of Okinawa. It runs through Okinawa City and meets the East China Sea on the western side of the island between the municipalities of Kadena and Yomitan. It supplies much of the island's drinking water.

== Course ==
The Hija River originates from a group of hills in the southern portion of Okinawa City in the central portion of the island of Okinawa. It flows north through a densely urbanized portion of the city, receiving the Kahunja River from the east as it passes through the neighborhood of Misato. Soon after this, it turns west, and receives additional tributaries, including the Yonabaru River to the north. After passing under a stretch of National Route 58, it joins with the Nagata River, and then drains into the East China Sea on the western side of the island, at the border between Kadena and Yomitan.

== Description ==
The Hija River has a length of 15.4 kilometres (9.6 mi) and a drainage basin measuring 50.9 square kilometres (19.7 sq mi) in area. It is the largest river on the island of Okinawa. The area exhibits a humid subtropical climate, with annual rainfall averaging around 2,000 mm (6.6 ft), and an average annual temperature of 23 °C (73 °F). Along with its largest tributary, the Yonabaru, it supplies much of Okinawa's drinking water.

The upper portion of the river basin is composed largely of mudstone of the Shimajiri Group. Regions of conglomerate rocks are found within the northern areas of the basin, while much of the southern region consists of limestone.

The central reaches of the river run through a forested environmentally-protected area, which includes dense groves of Ryukyu pines. Much of the river's watershed lies within American military bases. During the Ryukyu Kingdom, a large stone bridge was built at the river's mouth near Yara Castle. This was destroyed during the Battle of Okinawa, following which a new bridge at the site was built by American forces.

The region around the river's estuary mainly consists of sand and gravel, with a small amount of coral, especially of the subfamily Faviinae and the genus Acropora.
