= Yomitan =

Village in Okinawa Prefecture, Japan

Yomitan 読谷村 Yuntan
- Village
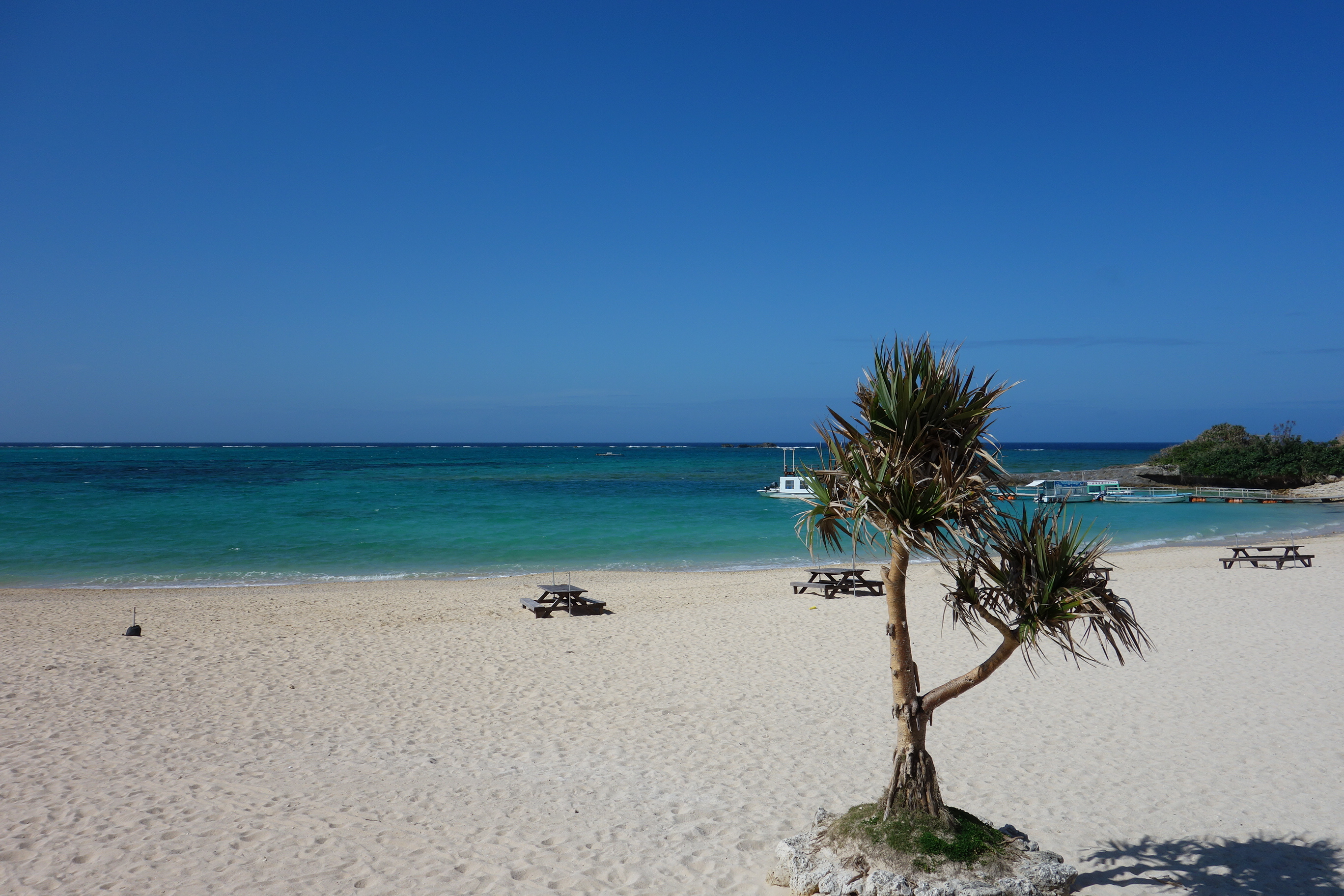
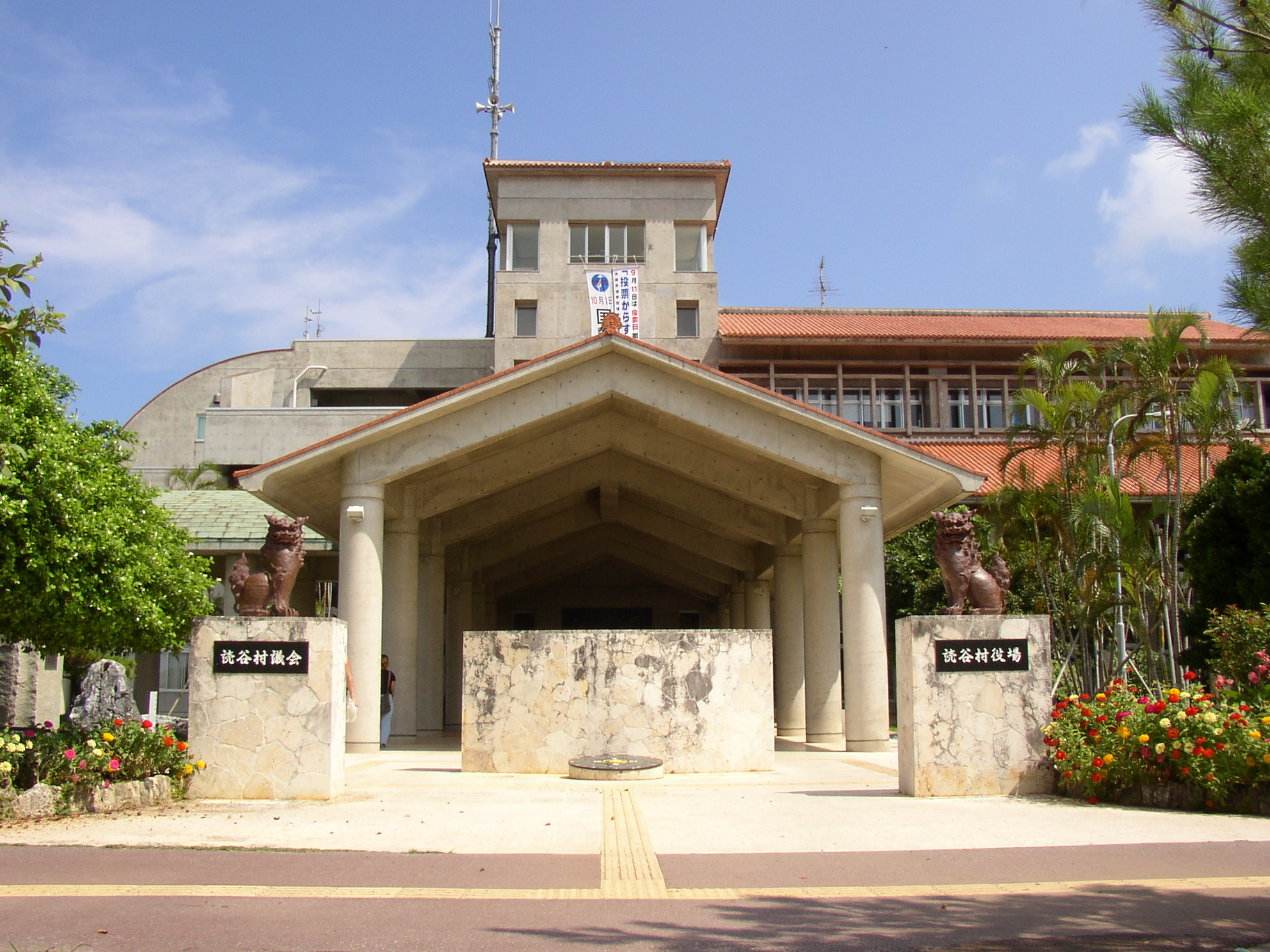
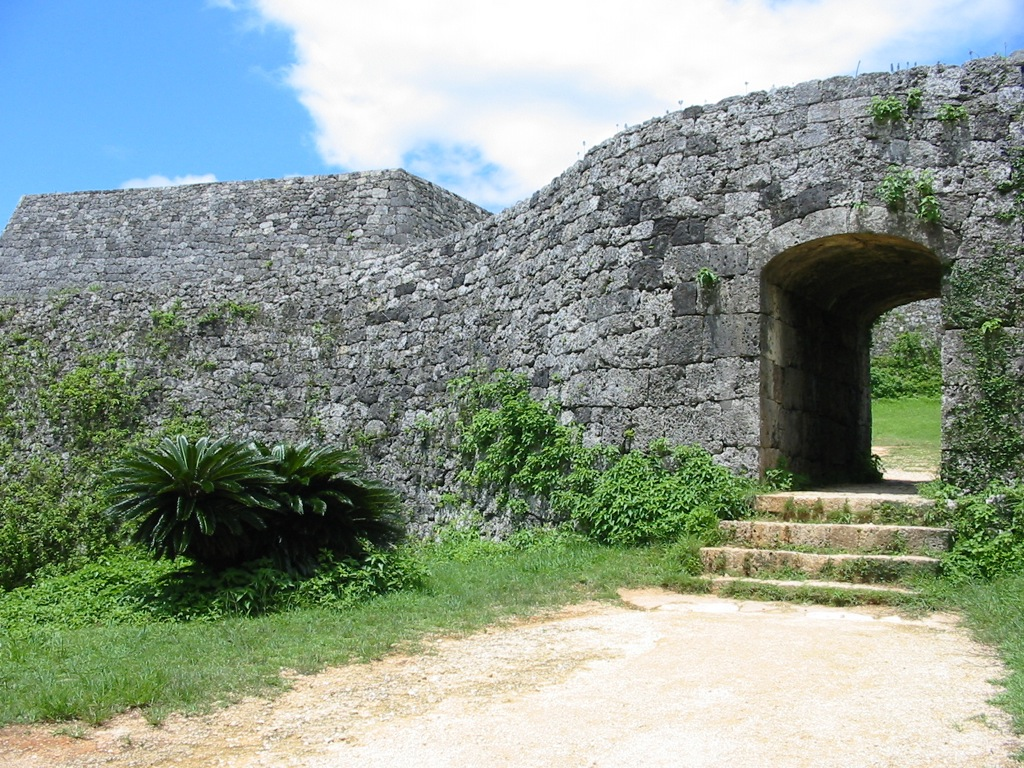
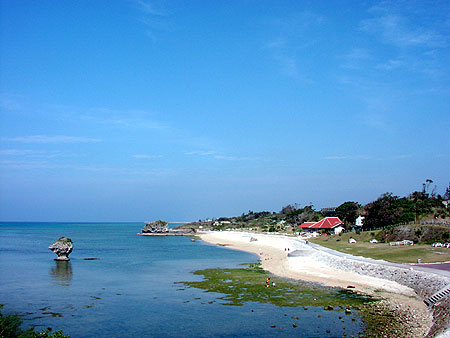
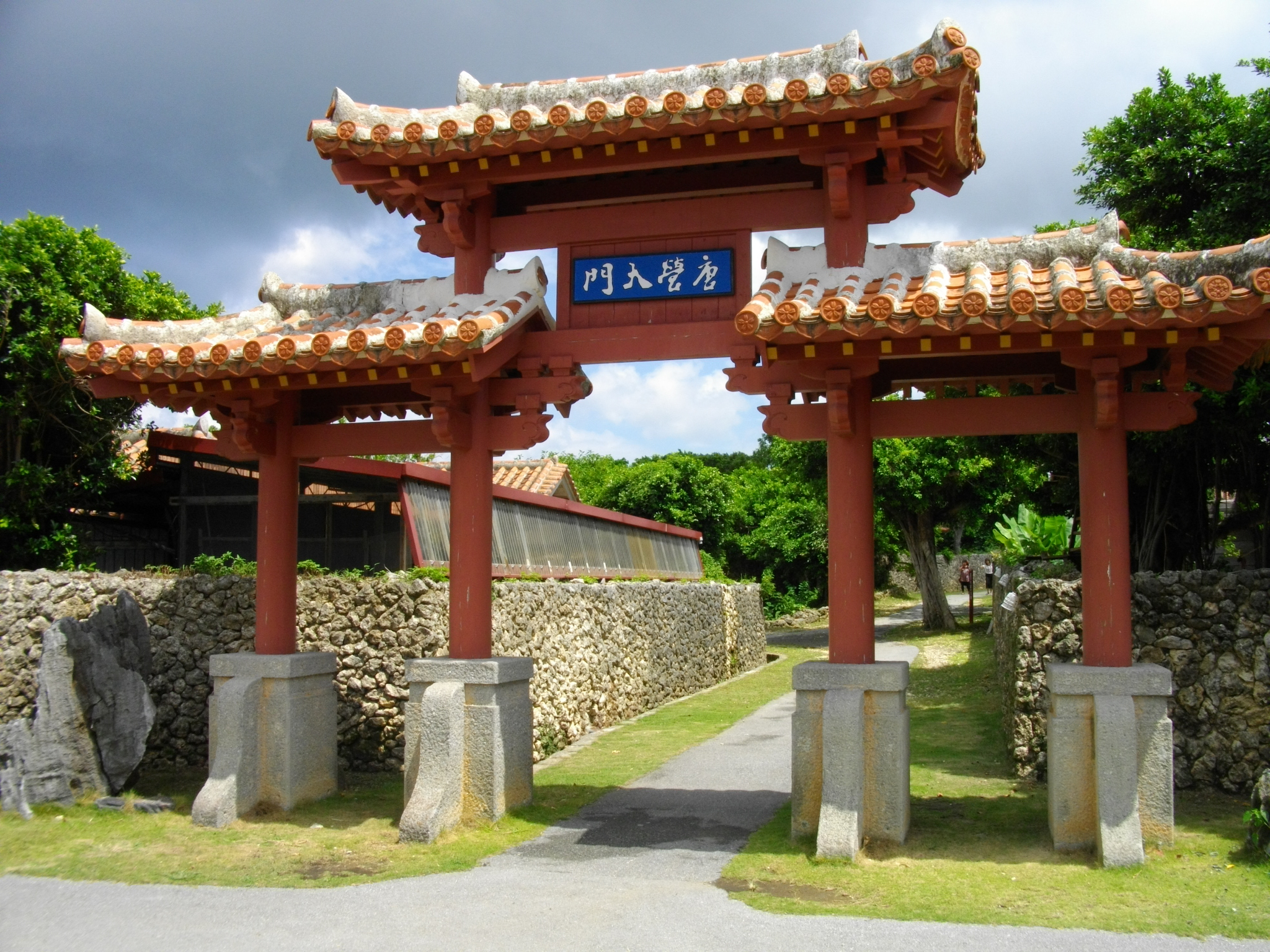
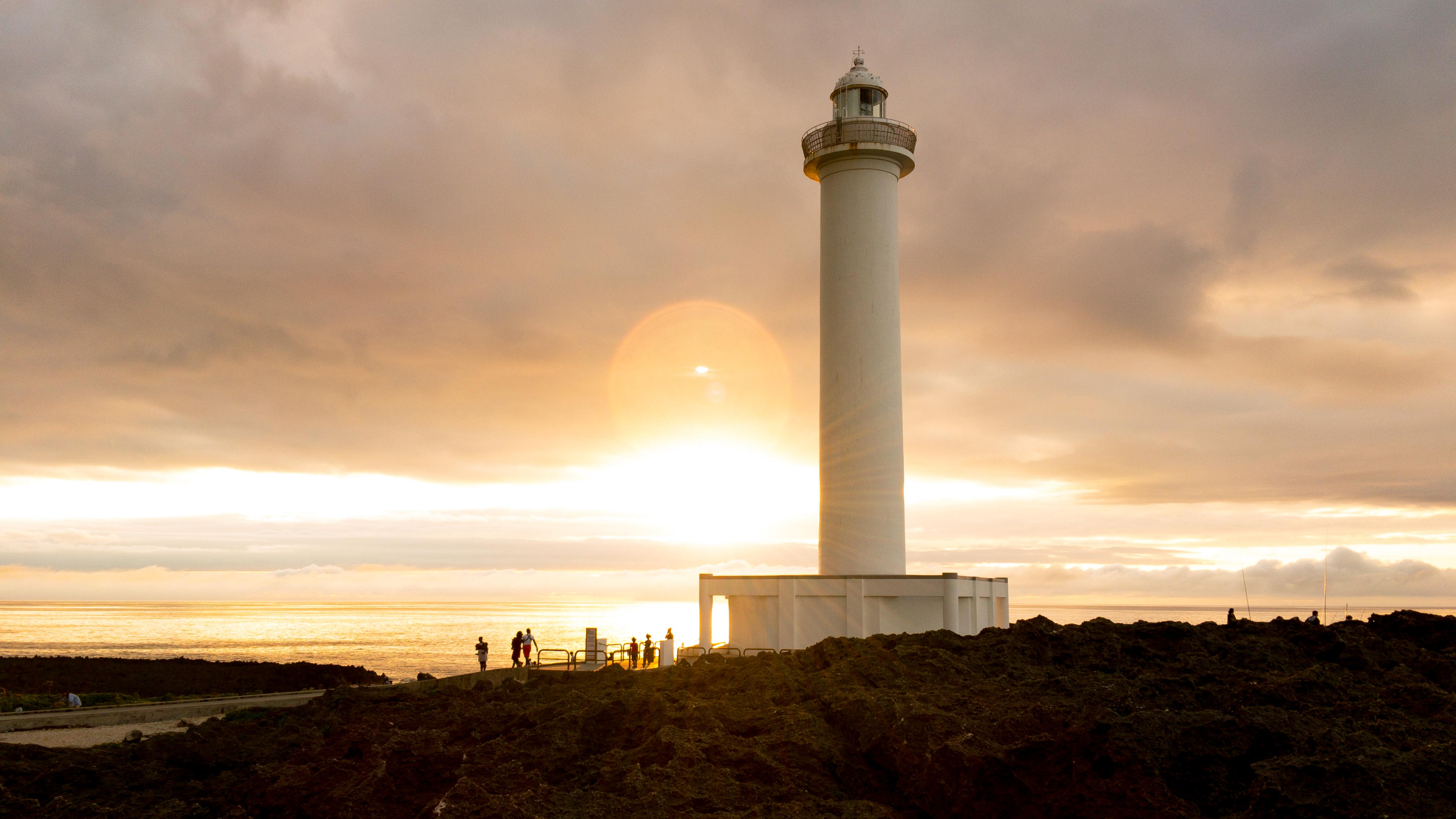
- Zanpa Beach Yomitan Village Office Zakimi Castle Toguchi Beach Murasaki Mura Cape Zanpa Lighthouse

- Flag Seal

- Location of Yomitan in Okinawa Prefecture

- Location in Japan
- Coordinates: 26°23′46″N 127°44′40″E
- Country: Japan
- Region: Kyushu
- Prefecture: Okinawa Prefecture
- District: Nakagami

Government
  - Mayor: Denjitsu Ishimine

Area
  - Total: 35.17 km^{2} (13.58 sq mi)

Population (October 1, 2020)
  - Total: 41,206
  - Density: 1,172/km^{2} (3,034/sq mi)
- Time zone: UTC+09:00 (JST)
- Website: web.archive.org/web/20070809122333/http://www.vill.yomitan.okinawa.jp:80/1/99.html

Yomitan (Japanese: 読谷村, Hepburn: Yomitan-son; Okinawan: Yuntan) is a village located in Nakagami District, Okinawa Prefecture, Japan.

== Geography ==
Yomitan is located on the western coast of the central part of Okinawa Island. The village is bound to the north by Onna, to the east by Okinawa City, to the south by Kadena, and to the west by the East China Sea.

31.5% of the land area is zoned for agriculture, 35.7% is zoned as forest, 12.3% is zoned for housing, and the remaining 20.6% is zoned for other uses.

=== Administrative divisions ===
The village includes twenty-three wards.

- Furugen (古堅)
- Gima (儀間)
- Hija (比謝)
- Hijabashi (比謝矼)
- Iramina (伊良皆)
- Kina (喜名)
- Makibaru (牧原)
- Nagata (長田)
- Nagahama (長浜)
- Namihira (波平)
- Ōki (大木)
- Ōwan (大湾)
- Oyashi (親志)
- Senaha (瀬名波)
- Sobe (楚辺)
  - Ōsoe (大添)
- Takashiho (高志保)
- Toguchi (渡具知)
- Tokeshi (渡慶次)
- Toya (都屋)
- Uechi (上地)
- Uza (宇座)
- Zakimi (座喜味)

== History ==
Originally known as Yomitanzan (読谷山; Okinawan: Yuntanja), it was part of the Kingdom of Chūzan during the Sanzan period. In 1416, the Aji of Yomitanzan Magiri, Gosamaru, helped Shō Hashi invade Hokuzan. Although Gosamaru lived in Yamada Castle, Shō Hashi allowed him to build Zakimi Castle. The castle, along with other castle sites in Okinawa, was designated a World Heritage Site by UNESCO in November 2000. The port of Hamanaga, which was located in the north of Yomitanzan, was an important center of Nanban, or "southern barbarian", trade of the Ryukyu Kingdom. Yomitanzan was also the site of a landing during the Invasion of Ryukyu by Satsuma Domain in 1609. After Japan annexed Ryukyu in 1879, Yomitanzan continued to be a magiri; all of the magiri were abolished in 1907 and Yomitanzan became a village.

Yomitan was the initial site of fighting on Okinawa Island during World War II. Zakimi Castle was used as a gun emplacement by the Japanese military. The Hija River, between Yomitan and then-Chatan (Kadena area), was the site of the initial landing of the Allied forces in the Battle of Okinawa. The United States Marine Corps landed on the Yomitan-side of the river, while the United States Army landed on the Chatan side. The village is known for one of the most devastating examples of mass suicide during World War II. Villagers took refuge in Chibichiri Cave during the Battle of Okinawa. Faced with the rapid advance of American troops, approximately 140 men, women, and children were convinced or ordered by the Japanese military to commit mass suicide (shūdan jiketsu) on April 2, 1945. After the war, the village was renamed Yomitan.

== Population ==
As of December 2012, the village had an estimated population of 40,517 and a population density of 1,200 inhabitants per square kilometre (3,100/sq mi). The total area of the village is 35.17 square kilometres (13.58 mi^{2}). This is the largest village in Japan by population.

== Government ==
The mayor of Yomitan is Denjitsu Ishimine. As Yomitan is designated as a village, it is under the administration of Nakagami District. Once Yomitan reaches a population of over 50,000 it can then be classified as a city shi (市), thereby gaining a measure of autonomy and independence.

The village has adopted as its symbol the flying phoenix, playing on the fact that the shape of the village resembles a bird in flight. The village flower is the bougainvillea.

== Industry ==
6% of the working population of Yomitan is engaged in so-called "primary" industries, including agriculture and fishing. 25% is engaged in the "secondary" industries, i.e. food processing and manufacturing; and 69% is engaged in the "tertiary" industries, services and trade.

== Agriculture ==
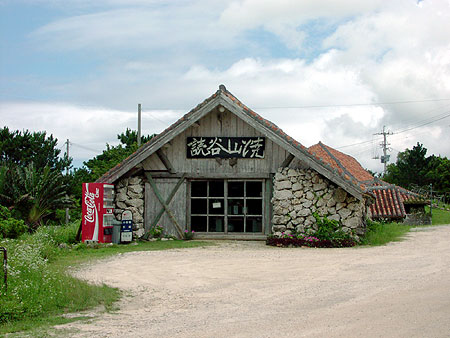
Kiln in Yomitan producing yachimun

The chief cash crop of Yomitan is the chrysanthemum, which, unlike in mainland Japan, can be grown in Okinawa during the winter months with the aid of artificial light at night. Chrysanthemums are followed in value by sugarcane and pigs, in that order.

Sugarcane is particularly suited to cultivation in Okinawa, as it does not require significant infrastructure (such as irrigation), grows well in Okinawa's soil, and can be left unattended for 18 months until harvest. The harvesting, refining, and butchering of commercial agricultural products are coordinated by the National Mutual Insurance Federation of Agricultural Cooperatives (JA), and the growers receive a share of the profits.

Another important crop in Yomitan is the purple sweet potato (紅いも, beni imo), if not for its value as a cash crop then as part of the local culture and tourist industry; the town promotes itself as the "beni imo hometown" (紅いもの里, beni imo no sato), and holds a Miss Beni Imo (紅いも娘, beni imo musume) contest each year. Sweet potato cultivation first reached Japan via Okinawa from present-day Taiwan, predating rice cultivation, and either Yomitan or neighboring Kadena can lay claim as the first cultivators of sweet potato in Japan.

== Culture ==
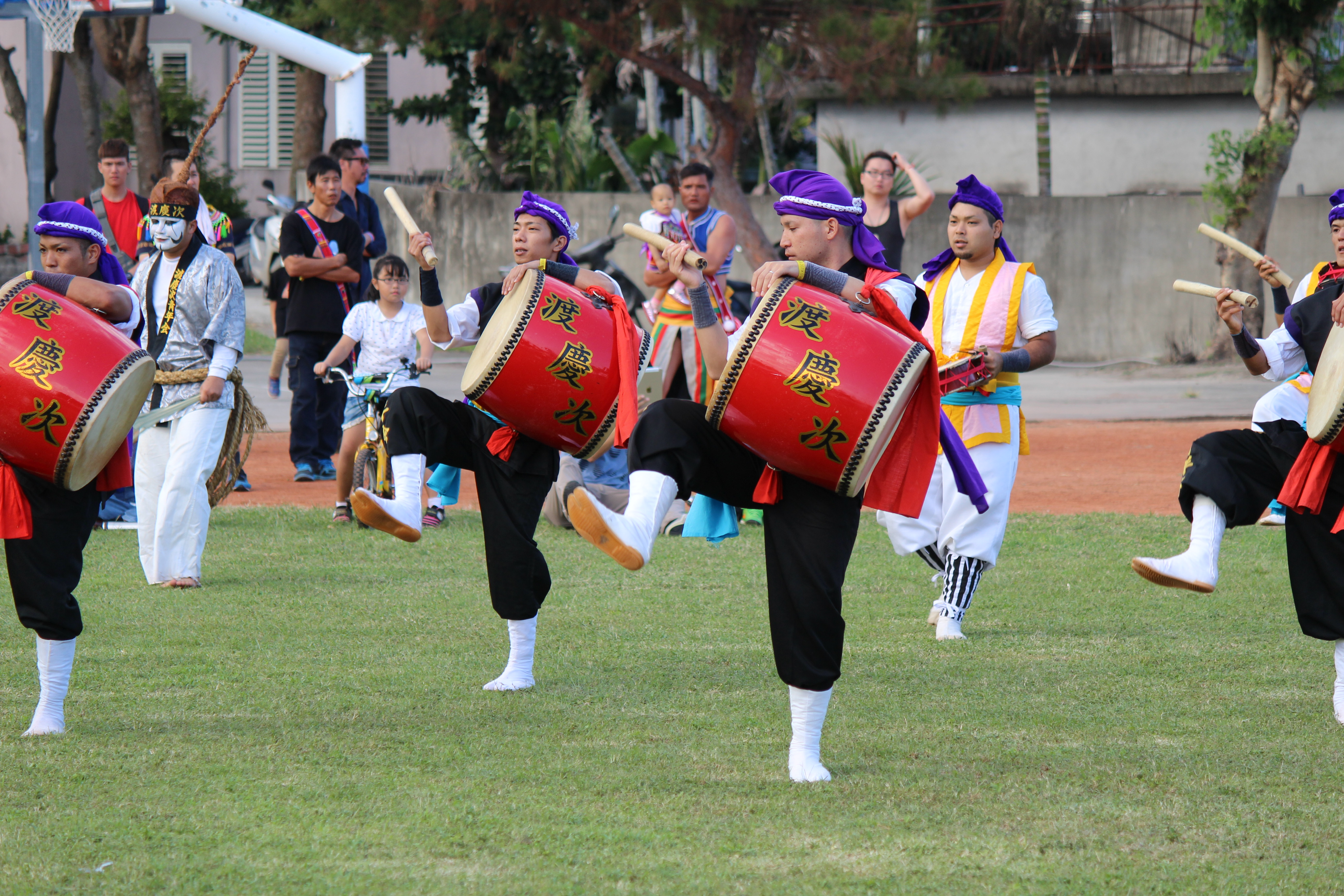
Yomitan youth performing an eisa dance

In addition to largely unspoiled beaches, Yomitan attracts tourists for its folk crafts, including Ryukyuan pottery (yachimun, or やちむん in Okinawan), glassblowing (Ryukyu glass being a famed product), sugar making, and salt making. There are several facilities where tourists can try their hand at these crafts and take their handiwork home as souvenirs.

Also of interest are the remains of Zakimi Castle (座喜味城, Zakimi Gusuku).

== Cultural and natural assets ==
Yomitan Village hosts twelve designated or registered tangible cultural properties and monuments, at the national, prefectural or municipal level.

- Name (Japanese) (Type of registration)

=== Cultural Properties ===
- Hija Bridge Inscription (比謝橋碑文) (Municipal)
- Yomitan Zero Milestone (読谷村道路元標 / 讀谷山村道路元標) (Municipal)
- Zakimi Castle Site (座喜味城跡) (Prefectural)

=== Folk Cultural Properties ===
- Kina Kannondō Shrine (喜名観音堂) (Municipal)
- Kina Tūtīkū Praying Site (喜名土帝君) (Municipal)
- Tī-uhaka Tomb (樋御墓) (Municipal)

=== Historic Sites ===
- Bunker (掩体壕) (Municipal)
- Chibichirigama Cave (チビチリガマ) (National)
- Kina Banjo Guards House (喜名番所跡) (Municipal)
- Momenbaru Site (木綿原遺跡) (National)
- Monument to the Loyal Dead (忠魂碑) (Municipal)
- Nagahama Shell Mound (長浜貝塚) (Municipal)
- Zakimi Castle Site (座喜味城跡)

== U.S. military bases ==
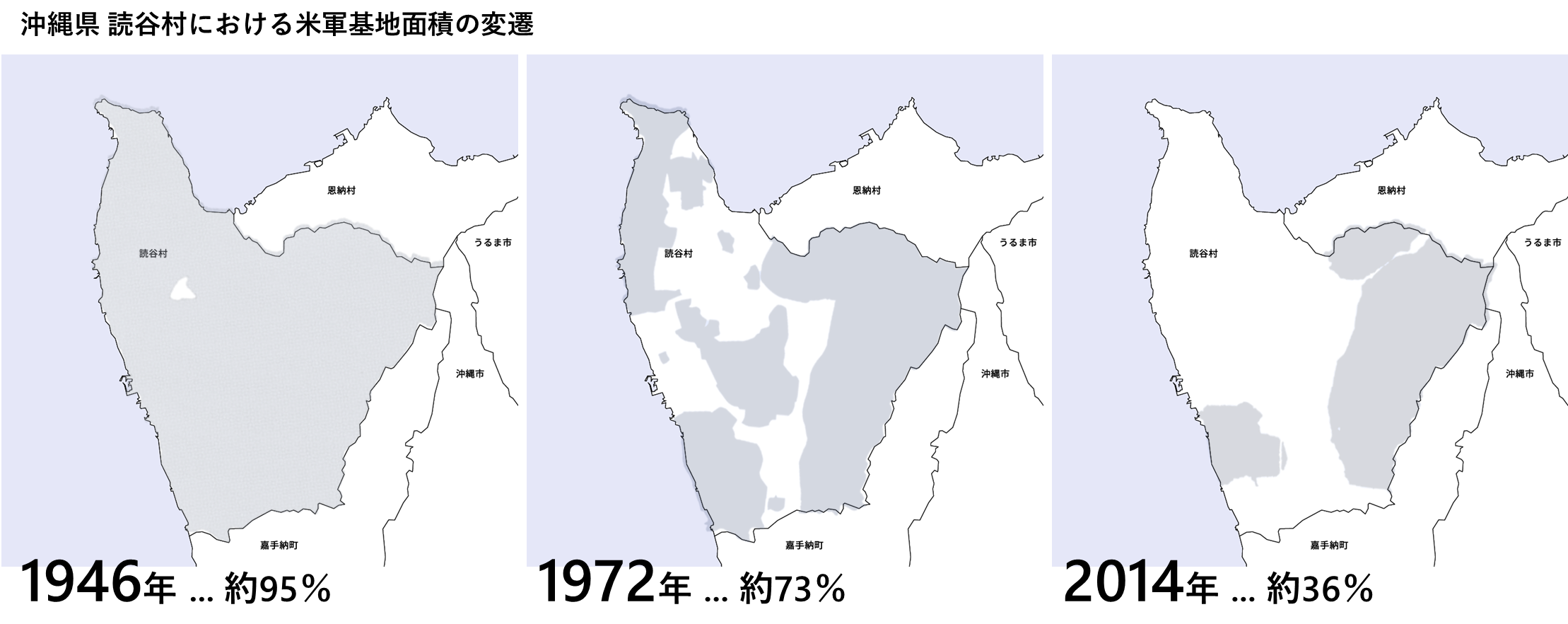
Reclamation of Yomitan for civilian use: Grey denotes the area leased to the U.S. military in 1946, 1972, and 2014.

Approximately 1,261 hectares (3,120 acres; 12.61 km^{2}), which is 36% of the area of the village, is leased to the Ministry of Defense of Japan and used as United States military bases under the U.S.–Japan Status of Forces Agreement. Areas outside the current boundary of Torii Station were developed as American family housing, but have been returned to Okinawan ownership.

Two facilities, Torii Communication Station (Army; 194 ha) and a part of Kadena Ammunition Storage Area (Air Force and Marine; 1066 ha), are located in the village. Senaha Communication Site (Air Force; 61 ha), Sobe Communication Site (aka Elephant Cage, decommissioned in 2006, Navy; 54 ha), and Yomitan Auxiliary Airfield (Marine; 191 ha) were returned in 2007 and have been developed into the Yomitan Village Office and civic facilities, including running tracks and baseball fields.

== Transportation ==
Yomitan is connected to Naha and other areas of Okinawa Island by bus. The town is crossed by Japan National Route 58.

== Notable people from Yomitan ==
- Tsutomu Aragaki, tenor
- Keiko Itokazu, politician
- Tokushin Yamauchi, politician
- Chōbyō Yara, former politician
