= Fink (surname) =

- Pronunciation: German: [fɪŋk]
- Language: German, Yiddish, English

Origin
- Language: German
- Meaning: 'finch'

Fink is a surname. Notable people with the surname include:

== People ==
- Aaron Fink (musician), guitarist of Breaking Benjamin
- Aaron Fink (artist) (born 1955), American artist
- Aiden Fink (born 2004), Canadian ice hockey player
- Albert Fink (1827–1897), German-born American civil engineer
- Ashley Fink (born 1986), American actress
- Benjamin Fink (1847–1909), Australian financier, land speculator, and politician
- Bernarda Fink (born 1955), Argentine mezzo-soprano
- Brigitte Fink (1940–2024), Italian luger
- Bruce Fink (1861–1927), American lichenologist
- Bruce Fink, American Lacanian psychoanalyst
- Charles Fink, American politician
- Cristina Fink (born 1964), Mexican high jumper
- Conrad Fink (1900–1981), German politician
- Denman Fink (1880–1956), American artist and magazine illustrator.
- Eugen Fink (1905–1975), German philosopher
- Gottfried Wilhelm Fink (1783–1846), German composer, music theorist, poet and Protestant clergyman
- Grant Fink (born 1990), American baseball coach
- Günter Fink (1918–1943), German Luftwaffe fighter ace
- Heinrich Fink (1935–2020), German politician
- Jens Fink-Jensen (born 1956), Danish artist and poet
- Jesse Fink (born 1973), British-Australian author
- John Fink (born 1940), American actor
- Kathryn Ferguson Fink (1917–1989), American biochemist
- Larry Fink (photographer), (1941–2023), American photographer
- Laurence D. Fink (born 1952), American businessman
- Leon Fink (historian) (born 1948), American historian
- Marcos Fink (born 1950), Argentine bass-baritone
- Matic Fink (born 1990), Slovenian footballer
- Doctor Fink, stage name of Matthew Fink, American musician
- Michael Fink (footballer) (born 1982), German footballer
- Nadia Fink (born 1977), Argentine author
- Olaf Fink (1914–1973), American educator and state senator
- Orenda Fink (born 1975), American musician
- Patricia Fink (born 1960), singer in Japan
- Paulette Fink (1911–2005), French Jewish nurse and resistance worker
- Peter Thomas Fink, Australian Chief Defence Scientist
- Reuben Fink (1889–1961), Ukrainian-American Yiddish writer
- Robert O. Fink (1905–1988), American papyrologist
- Shaney Fink, American volleyball player athletic director
- Stanley Fink (1936–1997), American lawyer and politician
- Stanley Fink (finance) (born 1957), British hedge fund executive
- Theodore Fink (1855–1942), Australian politician, newspaper proprietor and educationist
- Thomas Fink (born 1972), Anglo-American statistical physicist
- Thomas Fink (poet) (born 1954), American poet and literary critic
- Thorsten Fink (born 1967), German football player and coach
- Tom Fink (1928–2021), American politician from Alaska
- Ulf Fink (1942–2025), German politician
- Uri Fink (born 1963), Israeli comic book artist
- Walter Fink (1930–2018), German patron of music

== Fictional people ==
- Barton Fink, the title character of a movie by the Coen Brothers
- Gussie Fink-Nottle, a recurring character in P.G. Wodehouse's novels
- Jeremiah Fink, a major antagonist in the video game BioShock Infinite
- Mike Fink (1770–1823), a figure of American folklore
- Wilhelm Fink, alias of Green Day frontman Billie Joe Armstrong

== See also ==
- Senator Fink (disambiguation)
- Finkel
- Finkl
