= Patty (singer) =

- Birth name: Patricia Ann Fink
- Also known as: Patty Fink
- Born: November 5, 1960 (age 64); Johnson Air Base, Iruma, Saitama, Japan
- Occupation(s): Singer, tarento, model
- Years active: 1979–present
- Labels: King Records (1979); Toshiba EMI (1980–1983)
- Website: Patricia Fink Facebook

Patty (パティ, Patī; born November 5, 1960) is a former singer, tarento and English teacher in Japan. She is a hāfu American who started her music career under the name "Patty Fink" in 1979.

== Bio ==
Patricia Ann Fink was born on November 5, 1960, in Iruma, Saitama, to a Japanese mother, Hiroko Takahashi and an American father, an airman. She attended Kubasaki and Kadena High School in Okinawa and Yokota High School in Tokyo. In 1979, she made her recording debut with her first single "My Life", a soundtrack song of the movie "See How She Runs" (Japanese title: My Life) on the Seven Seas label (King Records) as Patty Fink. As Patty, she signed with Eastworld record label (Toshiba EMI) and released her second single, "Taiyo no Utopia" on February 5, 1980. This NTV drama theme music song peaked at No. 18 on the Oricon chart. In the same year, she sang other channel 4 drama's title songs "Konoyume no Hatemade" (Oricon #27) and "Ashita...Saku" (Oricon #29). Without English lyrics, "Ashita" is best remembered among Japanese people. She released three vinyl albums, "My Life" (1978), "Far Away" (1980), "Second Impression" (1981) and one compact disc, "Idol Miracle Bible Patty Best" (2003), reissue of her EMI albums and a single. As she is fluent in both Japanese and English, she appeared on television and radio shows a lot. She also posed in bikinis for Weekly Playboy magazine three times and the cover of Heibon Punch magazine. She now lives with two chihuahuas in Tampa, Florida.

== Music ==
=== Songs ===
- My Life (written by Jimmie Haskell)
- Taiyo no Utopia
- Konoyume no Hatemade / Yesterday Is Gone
- Kimagure ni Sayonara / Wind
- Ashita...Saku
- Létranger
- Blue My Love
- Ai no Country Song
- Ai no Coffee Break
- Omoide no Pendant (Kisetsu no Mayoigo)
- Cisco yori Ai wo Komete / You Never Made Me Feel Bad
- A Traveller in New Orleans
- Lovers in Paris
- The Land of the Midnight Sun
- Jiyu heno Kokai / Far Away
- Amor
- Summer Love Affair
- Squall Love
- Pearl Islands
- Nagisa no Omoide
- Yumeiro Heart
- Toki no Mayoigo

=== Albums ===
- My Life (Original Soundtrack, last name misspelled as "Finck")
- Far Away
- Second Impression
- Idol Miracle Bible Patty Best

== Television ==
- Bikkuri Nihon Shinkiroku
- Kakkurakin Daihoso!!
- Let's Go Young
- 8jidayo! Zenin Shugo (DVD release)
- Kohaku Utano Best Ten
- Yanyan Utau Studio

== Radio ==
- Hyakumannin no Eigo (English for Millions)

American English Dojo with Hyde Yano
This program was very popular among English learners.
American English Dojo Audio

- Yoru ha Tomodachi Koasa no Happy Talk
- Akashiya Sanma no All Night Nippon

== Magazines ==
- Weekly Playboy
- Heibon Punch

== Trivia ==
- One of her favorite memories was interviewing Styx for a concert at the age of 22. She was starstruck and could barely talk.
- She went to Japan with Diana Ross for her Amway Tokyo Dome concert as her manager in 1994.
