= Dick Palmer (American football) =

American football player (born 1947)

No. 50, 52, 51
- Position: Linebacker

Personal information
- Born: April 9, 1947 (age 79); Lexington, Kentucky, U.S.
- Listed height: 6 ft 2 in (1.88 m)
- Listed weight: 232 lb (105 kg)

Career information
- High school: Kubasaki (Japan)
- College: Kentucky
- NFL draft: 1970: 10th round, 252nd overall pick

Career history
- Miami Dolphins (1970); Buffalo Bills (1972); New Orleans Saints (1972–1973); Atlanta Falcons (1974)
- Stats at Pro Football Reference

Richard Harry Palmer (born April 9, 1947) is an American former linebacker who spent four seasons in the National Football League (NFL), playing with the Miami Dolphins, Buffalo Bills, New Orleans Saints and Atlanta Falcons. Palmer appeared in 43 total career games.
