= R. Lee Ermey =

US Marine sergeant and actor (1944–2018)

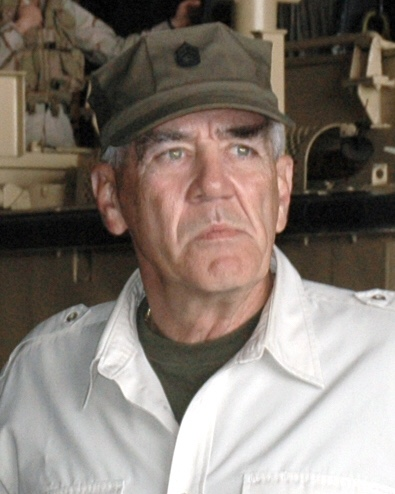
- Ermey aboard USS Belleau Wood in 2005
- Born: Ronald Lee Ermey; March 24, 1944; Emporia, Kansas, U.S.
- Died: April 15, 2018 (aged 74); Santa Monica, California, U.S.
- Burial place: Arlington National Cemetery
- Occupations: Actor; U.S. Marine drill instructor
- Years active: 1978–2017
- Political party: Independent
- Spouses: Dolores Janshen (m. 1962; div. 1969) Marianila Ypon (m. 1975)
- Children: 6
- Military career
- Allegiance: United States
- Branch: United States Marine Corps
- Service years: 1961–1972
- Rank: Staff sergeant Gunnery sergeant (honorary)
- Nickname: "Gunny"
- Units: India Company, 3rd Recruit Training Battalion; Marine Wing Support Group 17
- Conflicts: Vietnam War
- Awards: Meritorious Unit Commendation; Republic of Vietnam Gallantry Cross

Ronald Lee Ermey (March 24, 1944 – April 15, 2018) was an American actor and U.S. Marine drill instructor. He achieved fame for his role as Gunnery Sergeant Hartman in the 1987 film Full Metal Jacket, which earned him a Golden Globe nomination for Best Supporting Actor. Ermey was also a United States Marine Corps staff sergeant and an honorary gunnery sergeant.

Ermey was often typecast in authority figure roles, such as Mayor Tilman in the film Mississippi Burning (1988), Bill Bowerman in Prefontaine (1997), Sheriff Hoyt in The Texas Chainsaw Massacre (2003) and its prequel The Texas Chainsaw Massacre: The Beginning (2006), Jimmy Lee Farnsworth in Fletch Lives (1989), a police captain in Seven (1995), plastic army men leader Sarge in the first three films of the Toy Story franchise (1995–2010), Major "Maddogg" Madison in Rocket Power, and John House in House.

On television, Ermey hosted two programs on the History Channel: Mail Call, in which he answered viewers' questions about various military issues both modern and historic; and Lock n' Load with R. Lee Ermey, which concerned the development of different types of weapons. Ermey also hosted GunnyTime on the Outdoor Channel.

== Early life ==
Ronald Lee Ermey was born in Emporia, Kansas, on March 24, 1944, to John Edward (1924–2016) and Betty (née Pantle) Ermey (1926–2004). A few years after his birth, John moved the family (including Ermey and his five brothers) to a small farm outside Kansas City, Kansas. Then, in 1958, when Ermey was 14, his father moved the family to a rural home between Zillah, Washington, and Granger, Washington.

As a teenager, Ermey was an admitted "troublemaker and a bit of a hell-raiser" and frequently got into trouble. In 1961, when Ermey was 17, Betty took Ermey to a judge in an attempt to correct his behavior. The judge gave the young Ermey a choice between military service or jail; Ermey chose military service.

== Military career ==
Ermey enlisted in the United States Marine Corps in 1961 at age 17 and went through recruit training at Marine Corps Recruit Depot San Diego in San Diego, California. He served in the aviation support field for a few years before becoming a drill instructor in India Company, 3rd Recruit Training Battalion, at Marine Corps Recruit Depot San Diego, where Ermey was assigned from 1965 to 1967.

Ermey then served in Marine Wing Support Group 17 at Marine Corps Air Station Futenma on Okinawa, Japan. In 1968, he was ordered to South Vietnam with MWSG-17 and spent 14 months in-country. The remainder of his service was on Okinawa, where Ermey was advanced to Staff Sergeant (E-6). He was medically retired in 1972 because of several injuries. On May 17, 2002, Ermey received an honorary promotion to Gunnery Sergeant (E-7) by Commandant of the Marine Corps General James L. Jones.

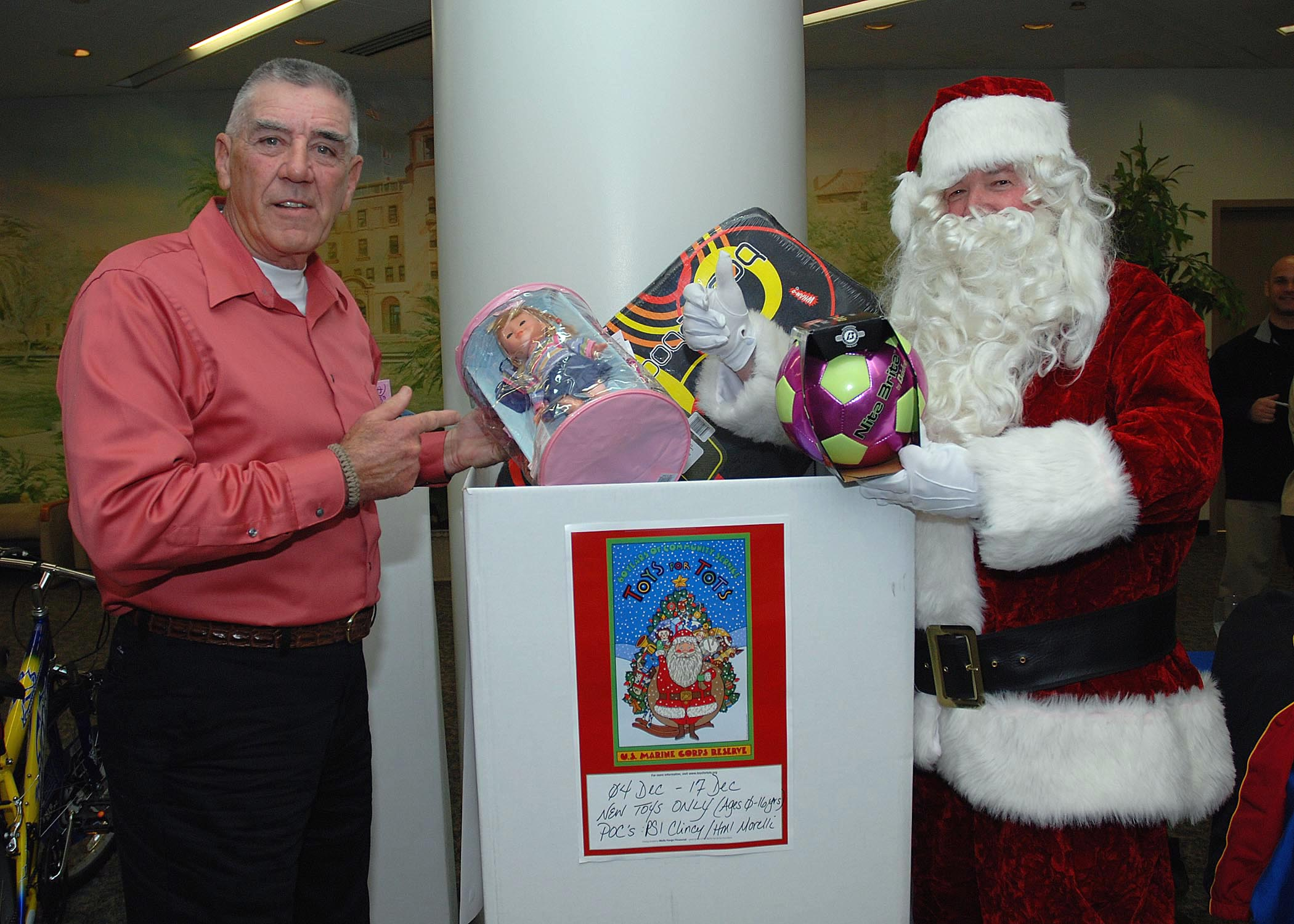
Ermey joins Santa Claus at the Toys for Tots donation box, Naval Medical Center San Diego (2008)

Ermey regularly took the opportunity to speak with new recruits, visiting the Marine Corps Recruit Depot San Diego in San Diego, California, and the Marine Corps Recruit Depot Parris Island. An episode of the History Channel's Mail Call was filmed at MCRD San Diego. He also acted as a spokesperson for Toys for Tots.

== Acting career ==
Ermey appeared in over 100 films and television shows, including roles as a voice actor.

=== Early technical advice and first roles ===
After his discharge from the Marines, Ermey attended the University of Manila in the Philippines, using his G.I. Bill benefits. While there, Ermey was cast in his first film role, playing a Marine drill instructor in The Boys in Company C (1978). Then, while serving as a technical advisor to director Francis Ford Coppola, Ermey was also cast as a First Air Cavalry helicopter pilot in one scene in Apocalypse Now (1979). He also appeared as a Gunnery Sergeant in 1984's Purple Hearts: shot, like all his early films, in the Philippines.

=== Full Metal Jacket ===
Ermey had infrequent film roles until 1987, when he was cast as drill instructor Gunnery Sergeant Hartman in Stanley Kubrick's Full Metal Jacket. As with The Boys in Company C and Apocalypse Now, Ermey was initially hired by the production only as a technical advisor.

Ermey recorded several 30-minute sessions on videocassette with the first casting choice for Hartman, Tim Colceri, in which they hurled insults at a group of extras. Kubrick had intended these rehearsals as a venue for Colceri to learn how drill instructors could remove the civilian mindset from the personalities of new recruits. Ermey, realizing that Kubrick was watching the tapes he recorded with Colceri, treated the recordings as an audition for the role of Hartman. To this end, Ermey not only continued berating recruits long after Colceri's 30-minute practice session had ended, but had stagehands pelt him with tennis balls and oranges as he did it, showing a real drill instructor's level of concentration while at work.

Kubrick grew fascinated with Ermey's performances, which sometimes ran to two hours. The director later said to Rolling Stone that Ermey's intense familiarity with the role had perfected his delivery and fluency of improvisation to a level he could not hope to discover in a professional actor, no matter how many takes they were given. Colceri was replaced by Ermey before filming. In consolation for his months of preparation for the role of Hartman, Colceri was given the smaller role of a helicopter door-gunner.

Seeking authenticity for the war movie, Kubrick allowed Ermey to write, edit and improvise his own dialogue. His was the only performance in a Kubrick film that had a significant proportion of improvised dialogue, with Ermey writing more than half of his dialogue. Kubrick later praised Ermey as an excellent performer. Despite the technical demands of Ermey's extended dialogue scenes — his character has by far the most lines in the film — the actor sometimes satisfied Kubrick after only three takes, because he was prepared. This was extremely unusual on a Kubrick production, where the director would regularly demand 40 takes. In some circumstances, Kubrick would demand considerably more takes, claiming that actors were focusing more on remembering their lines than delivering believable emotions. Ermey's performance was extremely well-received and he was nominated for a Golden Globe Award as Best Supporting Actor.

=== Later films ===
Ermey eventually appeared in about 60 films, often in roles of authority figures similar to his character in Full Metal Jacket. These include Mayor Tilman in Mississippi Burning (1988), Sergeant Major Bill Hafner in The Siege of Firebase Gloria (also a Vietnam film, 1989), Jimmy Lee Farnsworth in Fletch Lives (1989), General Kramer in Toy Soldiers (1991), a police captain in Se7en (1995), a businessman named Benedict in Savate (1995), the ghost of a drill instructor in The Frighteners (1996), Bill Bowerman in Prefontaine (1997), Frank Martin in the remake of Willard (2003), and Sheriff Hoyt in The Texas Chainsaw Massacre (2003) and The Texas Chainsaw Massacre: The Beginning (2006). He also appeared in Sommersby, Naked Gun 33 1/3: The Final Insult, On Deadly Ground, Murder in the First, Leaving Las Vegas, Dead Man Walking, Switchback, Life, Saving Silverman, The Salton Sea, Man of the House, Best of the Best 3: No Turning Back (uncredited in a key supporting role), and The Watch.

Ermey also lent his voice as "Sarge", the plastic army men leader, in Toy Story (1995), Toy Story 2 (1999), and Toy Story 3 (2010), as well as a sergeant in X-Men: The Last Stand (2006). His voice was also briefly heard through a voice disguise machine in Recess: School's Out (2001).

=== Television ===
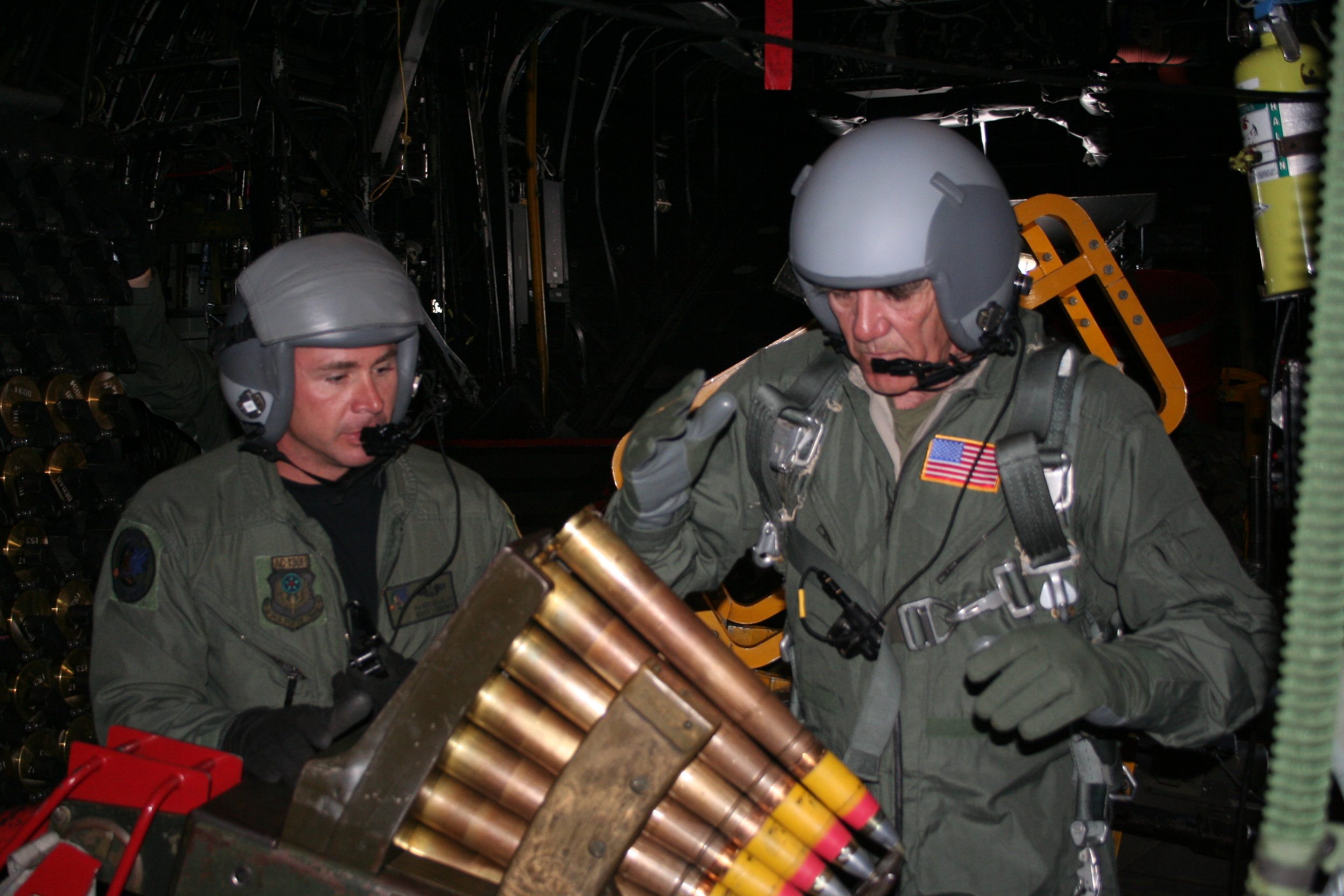
Ermey loading ammunition for the Bofors 40 mm gun aboard a Lockheed AC-130H "Spectre" Gunship in 2006

Ermey hosted two programs on the History Channel. The first program, Mail Call (2002–2009), consisted of him answering viewers' questions about various military issues both modern and historic. Ermey frequently discussed weaponry, tactical matters, and military history. Mail Call's subject matter was dictated by viewer emails; one episode focused on an M1 Abrams tank, while others involved World War II secrets, and others focused on elements of medieval warfare. The set consisted of a military tent, other military gear and weapons, and a World War II jeep. According to a 2005 episode of Mail Call filmed at Whiteman Air Force Base, he was the 341st person to fly in the B-2 stealth bomber.

Ermey hosted a second History Channel program entitled Lock n' Load with R. Lee Ermey (2009), which discussed the history of various weapons used by militaries of today.

Ermey served as host of GunnyTime, a show that debuted on Outdoor Channel in 2015.

Ermey guest-starred on a number of shows, usually appearing in a commanding military role. The shows included Kim Possible, The Simpsons, Roughnecks, Family Guy, SpongeBob SquarePants, The Grim Adventures of Billy & Mandy, Rocket Power, The Angry Beavers, Fillmore!, Miami Vice, Human Target, All Dogs Go to Heaven: The Series, Rough Riders, Cracker, My Life as a Teenage Robot, High Incident (as a retired USMC Major), and Invader Zim.

In 1993, Ermey appeared as the father of Bruce Campbell's character in The Adventures of Brisco County, Jr. for two episodes (1 and 8) of season one. On December 14, 1994, Ermey played a sheriff in Tales from the Crypt, season six, episode nine, "Staired in Horror". In 1995, he appeared unbilled as Sergeant Major Frank Bougus, USMC in the pilot episode of Space: Above and Beyond. Ermey also played the role of Reverend Patrick Findley, a minister, on The X-Files season 3, episode 11, "Revelations".

Ermey also made guest appearances on the television drama House, playing the role of Dr. Gregory House's father, who was a decorated naval aviator while serving in the Marine Corps ("Daddy's Boy", "Birthmarks"), and the sitcom Scrubs, playing the Janitor's father. He also voiced Wildcat in several episodes of Batman: The Brave and the Bold.

Ermey voiced Colonel Leslie "Hap" Hapablap in two episodes of The Simpsons ("Sideshow Bob's Last Gleaming" and "Waiting for Duffman"). In the episode of SpongeBob SquarePants "Inmates of Summer", he voiced an irate warden of a maximum-security island prison who demoralized the inmates whenever he could. In the episode of The Angry Beavers "Fancy Prance", Ermey voiced the Lipizzaner stallions' instructor, Drill Sergeant Goonther.

Ermey was also featured each week on ESPN's College GameDay. His role was to insult the experts' incorrect picks from the previous week. In 2010, Ermey appeared in the Law & Order: Special Victims Unit episode "Trophy" as a paroled sex offender. The following year, he starred as a drill instructor on the X-Play special on Bulletstorm. In the Family Guy episode "Grumpy Old Man", Ermey guest-starred, again as a drill instructor.

=== Video games ===
In 1993, Ermey played Lyle The Handyman in the full motion video game Mega-CD/Sega CD game Double Switch. In 1996, he was the player character's superior officer in Earthsiege 2.

Ermey lent his voice to several video games, including Fallout Tactics: Brotherhood of Steel (as General Barnaky) and Crash Bandicoot: The Wrath of Cortex (as Wa-Wa). Ermey also made a cameo in Real War: Air, Land, Sea, a real-time strategy video game based on the official Joint Chiefs of Staff training game. In 2014, he did voice-over work for Call of Duty: Ghosts.

Several characters have made references to Ermey and the character of Hartman. In the game Fallout 3, a recruitable companion is named Sergeant RL-3, a modified military robot with a personality very similar to Ermey (the companion's name is a reference to Ermey's initials wherein the 3 is leetspeak for the letter E). In the World of Warcraft: Cataclysm expansion there is a character named "Lieutenant Emry" that speaks some of Ermey's signature lines from Full Metal Jacket. In Half-Life: Opposing Force, the drill sergeant from the initial boot camp stage had dialogue and mannerisms very similar to Ermey's character in Full Metal Jacket.

=== Commercials ===
Ermey was an official spokesman for Black Book (National Auto Research), Glock firearms, TRU-SPEC apparel, Tupperware, Victory Motorcycles, Hoover, SOG Specialty Knives, WD-40, Young Marines, and appeared in commercials for Coors Light, Dick's Sporting Goods, GEICO, and pistachio nuts. In late 2010, Ermey starred in a GEICO commercial as a drill-instructor-turned-therapist who insults a client, in a parody of some of his iconic characters. Ermey provided the introduction for the Professional Bull Riders. He can be seen giving a service announcement for Alamo Drafthouse Cinemas, demanding that viewers be quiet during the film. Ermey was a board member of the National Rifle Association of America.

== Personal life ==
Ermey married his wife, Nila, in 1975. They had four children and remained married until his death in 2018. Ermey affectionately referred to his wife as "Mrs. Gunny" frequently in Lock n' Load with R. Lee Ermey.

=== Business venture ===
Ermey was a co-founder of Bravery Brewing in Lancaster, California.

=== Military appearances ===
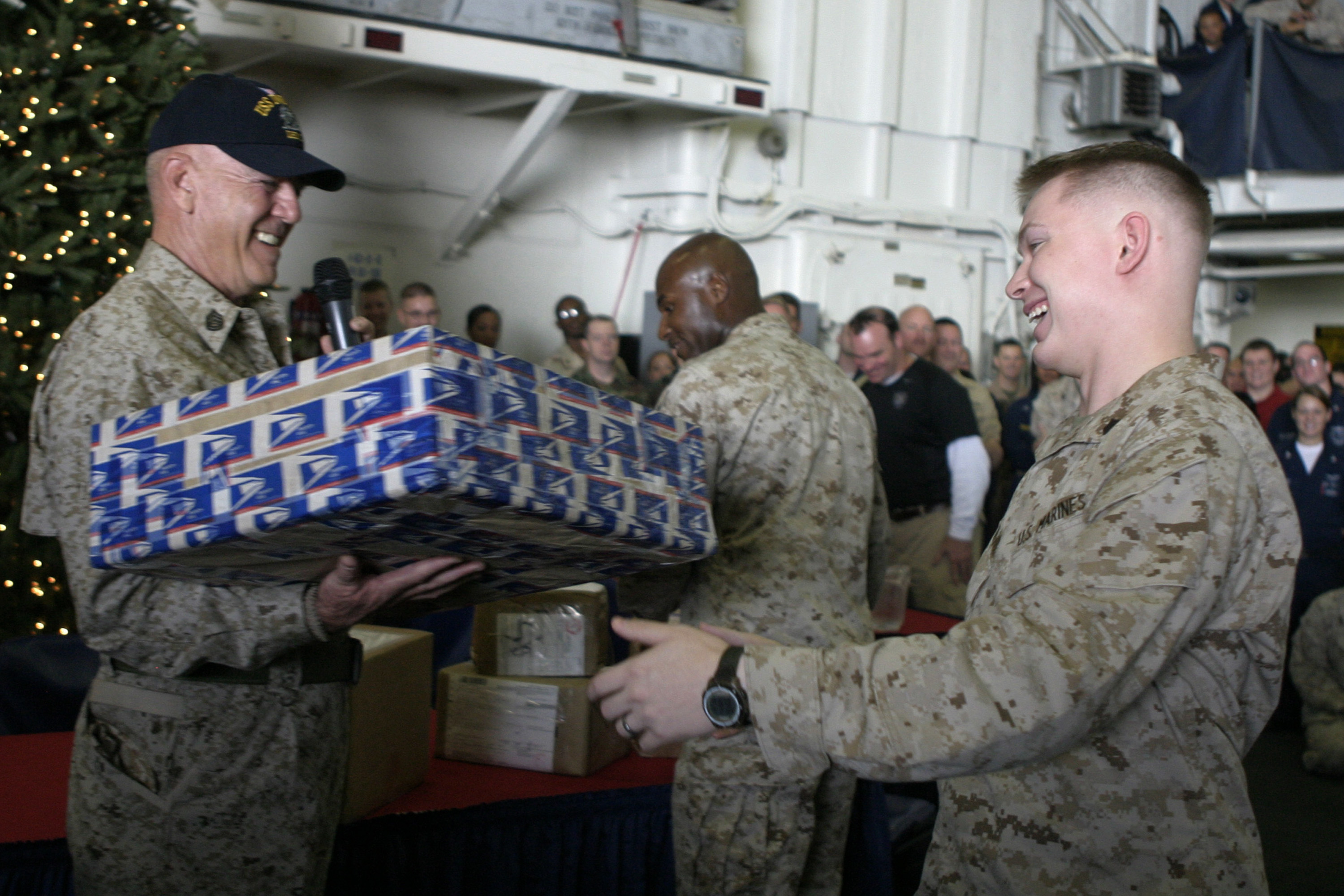
Ermey visits the USS Iwo Jima as a Morale, Welfare and Recreation event for deployed troops during the holidays. (2008)

On May 17, 2002, Ermey received an honorary post-service promotion to Gunnery sergeant from the Commandant of the Marine Corps General James L. Jones in recognition of his continuing support to Americans in military service.

Ermey traveled to Kuwait in June 2003 during the first phase of Operation Iraqi Freedom to film mail distribution by the Defense Department to service personnel for an episode of Mail Call.

Ermey conducted morale tours, visiting United States troops in locations such as Al Kut, Iraq, and Bagram Airfield, Afghanistan, in which he filmed parts for his television show Mail Call. While at Bagram Airfield, Ermey held a USO-type show in which he portrayed GySgt Hartman and conducted a comedy routine. Ermey also did the same at Doha, Qatar and Camp Doha, Kuwait City, Kuwait, in 2003.

=== Political views ===
Ermey described himself as an independent. In the 2008 presidential election, Ermey voted for Barack Obama, but subsequently criticized his economic policies, accusing Obama of attempting to "impose socialism" on the American people and "destroying the country." Ermey said in a 2015 interview that he supported Texas Senator Ted Cruz for president. Ermey said, "You know what, I just watched Ted Cruz – I mean, what a tough act to follow. I'm not going to tell you who I'm going to vote for, but I'm going to let you guess [...] and the first two guesses don't count!" He similarly praised presidential candidate Donald Trump in 2016.

Ermey was a supporter of the Second Amendment and a board member of the National Rifle Association.

== Death ==
Ermey died at a hospital in Santa Monica, California, from complications related to pneumonia on the morning of April 15, 2018, at age 74. His funeral was held in Arlington National Cemetery on January 18, 2019.

== Awards and decorations ==
R. Lee Ermey during the United States Marine Corps birthday ball, November 2006

Ermey was retroactively awarded the Marine Corps Drill Instructor Ribbon after he retired from the military due to his prior service as a Marine Corps recruit training instructor. Ermey's military awards included:

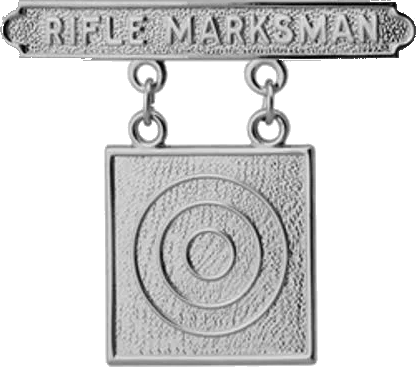
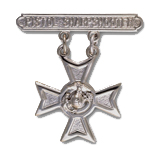

1st row	Meritorious Unit Commendation	Marine Corps Good Conduct Medal w/ two bronze Service stars	National Defense Service Medal
2nd row	Armed Forces Expeditionary Medal	Vietnam Service Medal w/ one bronze Campaign star	Marine Corps Drill Instructor Ribbon
3rd row	Republic of Vietnam Gallantry Cross with Palm	Vietnam Presidential Unit Citation	Republic of Vietnam Campaign Medal
Badges	Rifle Marksmanship Badge		Pistol Sharpshooter Badge

2 Service stripes

== Filmography ==
=== Film ===
Year	Title	Role	Notes
1978	The Boys in Company C	Staff Sergeant Loyce	Credited as Lee Ermey
1979	Apocalypse Now	Eagle Thrust Seven Helicopter Pilot	Uncredited
1979	Up from the Depths	Lee	
1984	Purple Hearts	Gunnery Sergeant "Gunny"	
1987	Full Metal Jacket	Gunnery Sergeant Hartman	Credited as "Lee Ermey"; Boston Society of Film Critics Award for Best Supporting Actor; Nominated – Golden Globe Award for Best Supporting Actor – Motion Picture
1988	Mississippi Burning	Mayor Tilman	
1989	The Siege of Firebase Gloria	Sergeant Major Bill Hafner / Narrator	Uncredited screenwriter
1989	Fletch Lives	Jimmy Lee Farnsworth	
1990	Demonstone	Colonel Joe Haines	
1990	The Rift	Captain Phillips	
1990	The Take	Weller	Television film
1990	I'm Dangerous Tonight	Lieutenant Ackman	Television film
1990	Kid	Luke	
1990	83 Hours 'Til Dawn	Glen Fairling	Television film
1991	The Terror Within II	Von Demming	
1991	Toy Soldiers	General Kramer	
1991	True Identity	Houston's Boss	Uncredited
1993	Hexed	Detective Ferguson	
1993	Sommersby	Dick Mead	
1993	Body Snatchers	General Platt	
1994	French Silk	Chief Crowder	Television film
1994	Chain of Command	Benjamin Brewster	
1994	On Deadly Ground	Stone	
1994	Rise and Walk: The Dennis Byrd Story	Mr. Byrd	Television film; uncredited
1994	Naked Gun 33 1/3: The Final Insult	Mess Hall Guard	Uncredited cameo
1994	Love Is a Gun	Frank Deacon	
1995	Murder in the First	Judge Clawson	
1995	Savate	Benedict	Short; Uncredited
1995	Best of the Best 3: No Turning Back	Preacher Brian	Uncredited
1995	Seven	Police Captain	
1995	Leaving Las Vegas	Conventioneer	
1995	Under the Hula Moon	Lieutenant Colonel J.P. McIntire	
1995	Toy Story	Sarge	Voice
1995	Dead Man Walking	Clyde Percy	
1995	Kidnapped	Frank	Television film
1996	Soul of the Game	Wilkie	Television film
1996	The Frighteners	The Late Master Sergeant Hiles	
1997	Prefontaine	Bill Bowerman	
1997	Dead Men Can't Dance	Senator Pullman T. Fowler	
1997	Weapons of Mass Distraction	Billy Paxton	Television film
1997	Switchback	Sheriff Buck Olmstead	
1997	Starship Troopers	News Announcer	Voice, Uncredited
1998	The Sender	Colonel Rosewater	
1998	Gunshy	Jerry	
1999	You Know My Name	Nix	Television film
1999	Life	Older Sheriff Pike	
1999	Avalanche	Gary	
1999	The Apartment Complex	Frank Stanton	Television
1999	Toy Story 2	Sarge	Voice
2000	The Chaos Factor	Colonel Ben Wilder	
2000	Skipped Parts	Caspar Callahan	
2000	Buzz Lightyear of Star Command: The Adventure Begins	Sarge	Voice; Direct-to-DVD
2000	Jericho	Marshall	
2001	Saving Silverman	Coach Norton	
2001	Recess: School's Out	Colonel O'Malley	Voice
2001	Megiddo: The Omega Code 2	President Richard Benson	
2001	Scenes of the Crime	Mr. Parker	
2001	Taking Sides	General Wallace	
2001	On the Borderline	Captain Elias	
2002	Run Ronnie Run!	Lead Kidnapper	Cameo
2002	The Salton Sea	Verne Plummer	
2002	Frank McKlusky, C.I.	Jockey Master	Uncredited cameo Direct-to-VD
2002	A.K.A. Birdseye	Sheriff Gathers	
2003	Willard	Frank Martin	
2003	The Texas Chainsaw Massacre	Charlie Hewitt / Sheriff Hoyt	Nominated – Fangoria Chainsaw Award for Best Supporting Actor
2004	Y.M.I.	John	
2005	Man of the House	Captain Nichols	
2006	X-Men: The Last Stand	Sergeant	Voice cameo
2006	Shark Bait	Jack	Voice
2006	The Texas Chainsaw Massacre: The Beginning	Charlie Hewitt / Sheriff Hoyt	
2008	Solstice	Leonard	
2010	Toy Story 3	Sarge	Voice
2010	An Okay Place to Eat	Sergeant Cereal	Voice
2012	The Watch	Manfred	

=== Television ===
Year	Title	Role	Notes
1987	Miami Vice	Detective Sergeant Ernest Haskell	Episode: "Rising Sun of Death"
1993	The Adventures of Brisco County, Jr.	Marshal Brisco County Sr.	2 episodes
1994	Tales from the Crypt	Sheriff	Episode: "Staired in Horror"
1995	Space: Above and Beyond	Sergeant Major Bougus	TV series
1995	The X-Files	Reverend Findley	Episode: "Revelations"
1996	Toy Story Treats	Sarge	
1995, 2015	The Simpsons	Colonel Leslie "Hap" Hapablap	Voice; 2 episodes
1997	The Angry Beavers	Sergeant Goonther	Voice; Episode: "Fancy Prance"
1997	Rough Riders	Secretary of State John Hay	2 episodes
1997–1998	Cracker	Lieutenant Fry	16 episodes
1998	All Dogs Go to Heaven: The Series	Sergeant Yorkie	Voice; Episode: "Dogfaces"
1999	Big Guy and Rusty the Boy Robot	General Thorton	Voice; 26 episodes
1999–2000	Roughnecks: Starship Troopers Chronicles	Sky Marshall Sanchez	Voice; 4 episodes
2001, 2011	Family Guy	Coach, Drill Sergeant	Voice; 2 episodes
2002	Scrubs	Janitor's Father	Episode: "My Old Man"
2002	Invader Zim	Sergeant Hobo 678	Voice; Episode: "Hobo 13"
2002–2009	Mail Call	Himself (Host)	
2003	Fillmore!	Colonel Thrift	Voice; Episode: "South of Friendship, North of Honor"
2003	Kim Possible	General Sims	Voice; 2 episodes
2003	Rocket Power	Madison	Voice; Episode: "Saving Lt. Ryan"
2004	The Grim Adventures of Billy & Mandy	Drill Sergeant	Voice; Episode: "Here Thar Be Dwarves!"
2004	Father of the Pride	Sergeant Bunny	Voice; Episode: "One Man's Meat Is Another Man's Girlfriend"
2005	My Life as a Teenage Robot	Sarge	Voice; Episode: "Last Action Zero"
2005–2008	House	John House	2 episodes
2007	SpongeBob SquarePants	Prison Warden	Voice; Episode: "The Inmates of Summer"
2008	Eleventh Hour	Bob Henson	Episode: "Agro"
2009	Lock n' Load with R. Lee Ermey	Himself (Host)	13 episodes
2009–2011	Batman: The Brave and the Bold	Wildcat	Voice; 4 episodes
2010	Law & Order: Special Victims Unit	Walter Burlock	Episode: "Trophy"
2012	Kung Fu Panda: Legends of Awesomeness	General Tsin	Voice, 3 episodes
2015–2017	GunnyTime	Himself (host)	31 episodes
2016	Military Makeover	Himself (host)	

=== Video games ===
Year	Title	Voice role	Notes
1993	Double Switch	Lyle, The Handyman	
1999	Toy Story 2: Buzz Lightyear to the Rescue	Sarge	
2001	Fallout Tactics: Brotherhood of Steel	General Barnaky	
2001	Real War: Rogue States	Briefings	
2001	Real War: Air, Land, Sea	Briefings	
2001	Crash Bandicoot: The Wrath of Cortex	Wa-Wa	Credited as R. Lee Ermy
2010	Toy Story 3	Sarge	
2013	Call of Duty: Ghosts	Drill Instructor DLC	

== Other media ==
- Ermey recorded voice lines for a "talking" 12-inch tall "motivational action figure" depicting him in USMC drill instructor uniform, which replays his signature put-downs with the press of an electronic button on the back. Sideshow Collectibles manufactured the figure in two versions, one with (somewhat) family-friendly language and one with "extra-salty" remarks that include profanity; the latter is packaged with an R rating as a warning to consumers. One of these figures appears occasionally on Mail Call, wherein it is often referred to as 'Mini-Lee' by the host, and is sometimes seen berating a G.I. Joe.
- Avenue N in Palmdale, CA was successfully petitioned to be renamed "R. Lee Ermey Avenue" in memoriam of the Antelope Valley resident. On 10 November 2023, at 1110 hours, an eastbound stretch of Avenue N east of Sierra Highway was officially opened as the R. Lee Ermey Musical Highway. By driving over the grooved pavement at 45 mph, the road will play 30 seconds of the Marine Corps Hymn.
