= Okinawa Christian School International =

School in Yomitan, Okinawa, Japan

Coordinates: 26°23′49″N 127°43′48″E

- 沖縄クリスチャンスクールインターナショナル
- Yomitan, Okinawa; Japan

Information
- Other names: OCSI
- Former names: Okinawa Christian School
- Type: Private
- Established: 1957; 69 years ago
- Campus: Suburban
- Colors: White, Red, and Black
- Website: www.ocsi.org

Okinawa Christian School International (OCSI) is a school located in Yomitan, Okinawa, Japan (not to be confused with the Okinawa Christian University).

== History ==
OCSI (Okinawa Christian School International) was established in 1957 to provide an English-language K-12 education for the children of American missionaries. During the first year, Esther Austin taught a class of 11 children in an unused building at the Far East Broadcasting Network's facility in Chatan, Okinawa. The purpose of the school was broadened to include children of non-Christian and non-church-affiliated families in the first few years. The school eventually moved into a more permanent facility on present-day Camp Lester (then called Camp Kuwae) consisting of two Quonset huts. OCSI purchased land on "Hacksaw Ridge" in Urasoe City, a site of fierce fighting during the Battle of Okinawa in World War II. By 1965 students moved into a new, larger school facility. Shortly after this expansion, OCSI celebrated its first commencement when the graduating class of 1969 received their high school diplomas. By 1986, OCSI was looking to expand again, and by 1996 a new campus overlooking the East China Sea in Yomitan Village was purchased. OCSI began classes in the new facility in the 1996–1997 school year.

OCSI, with over 500 PK-12 students, has been accredited by the Western Association of Schools and Colleges (WASC) since 1981, and by the Association of Christian Schools International (ACSI) since 1992.

- OCSI graduates are allowed by the Japan Ministry of Education (MEXT) to apply for Japanese university admissions.
- OCSI teaches in English and provides support for English language learners.

== Academics ==
OCSI uses a curriculum that is based on an American approach and a Christian philosophy of education. The course sequence and content are very similar to U.S. schools. The high school curriculum includes regular courses, honors courses, and AP courses which have a GPA weight of 4.0, 4.5, and 5.0 respectively (for an A or A+).

== Athletics ==
The school colors are white, red, and black. OCSI has a full-size gym with a newly remodeled fitness center. Next to the gym is a full-size soccer field.

OCSI competes in the following sports:

- Male & female volleyball
- Male & female cross-country
- Male & female basketball
- Male & female soccer
- Male & female track and field

The school's main rivals are Kadena High School, Kubasaki High School, and Zion Christian Academy.

== Recognition ==
The male Cross Country team has won 4 Cross Country Far-East titles (2012, 2013, 2014 & 2019).

== Alumni ==
- Liz Carmouche (Class of 2003), professional MMA fighter in the UFC

== See also ==
- Kadena High School
- Kubasaki High School
