= Marine Wing Headquarters Squadron 1 =

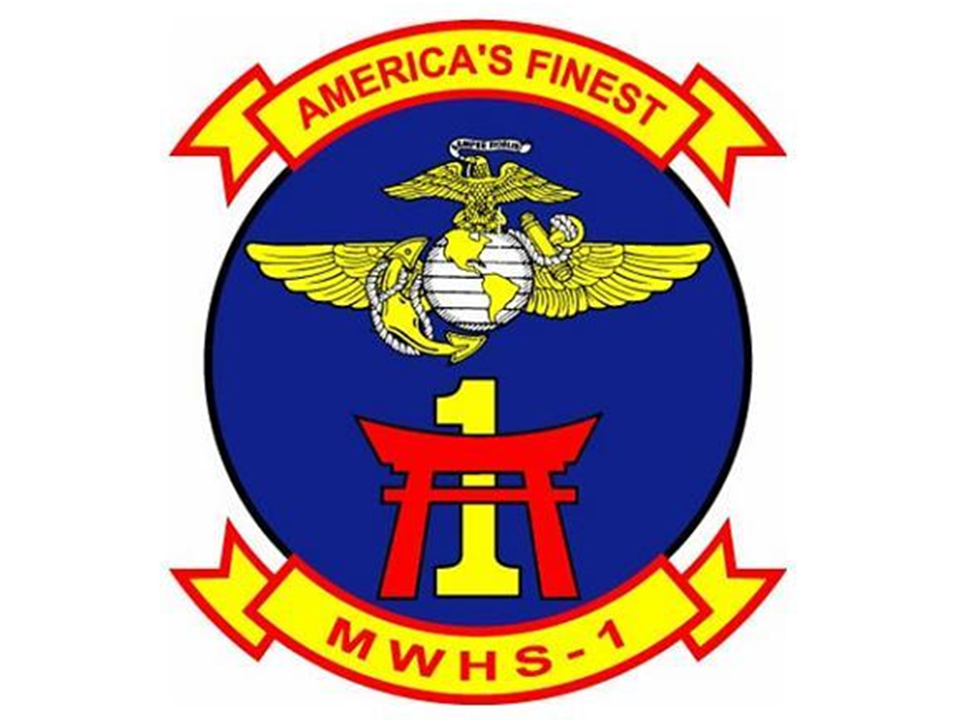
- Marine Wing Headqauarters Squadron 1 insignia
- Active: 7 July 1941-
- Country: United States
- Allegiance: United States of America
- Branch: United States Marine Corps
- Role: Headquarters
- Part of: 1st Marine Aircraft Wing; III Marine Expeditionary Force
- Garrison/HQ: Marine Corps Base Camp Foster
- Nickname: "America’s Finest"
- Engagements: World War II; Korean War; Vietnam War

Commanders
- Current commander: LtCol Colton Bowser

Marine Wing Headquarters Squadron 1 is the headquarters element of the 1st Marine Aircraft Wing and is located at Marine Corps Base Camp Foster on Okinawa, Japan.

== Mission ==
The mission of Marine Wing Headquarters Squadron 1 is to provide administrative and supply support for the 1st Marine Aircraft Wing Headquarters.

== History ==
=== World War II ===
The Squadron was organized on 7 July 1941, in Quantico, Virginia. Five months later, the Japanese struck Pearl Harbor. Shortly thereafter, the Squadron moved to NAS San Diego, California, in defense of the West Coast, which at the time was considered a potential Japanese target. As the Wing staff grew Headquarters Squadron often split to cover the advance and rear echelons. During World War II, the Squadron saw duty at Guadalcanal; New Caledonia; Espiritu Santo, New Hebrides; Emirau Island, St. Matthias and Solomon Islands; Bougainville; and Zamboanga, Philippine Islands. After World War II, Headquarters Squadron moved to China to accept the surrender of Japanese troops for the Chinese Central Government and to supervise the repatriation of Japanese military and civilians. The squadron arrived in Tientsin in October 1945, and remained until May 1947, when it moved to Barrigada Heights, Guam, before transferring to MCAS El Toro. Headquarters Squadron participated in exercises, joint maneuvers, organized reserve training, and other peacetime operations.

=== Korean War until present ===
In September 1950, the squadron deployed to Korea in support of the Wing throughout the Korean War. Following the truce, Headquarters Squadron relocated to MCAS Iwakuni, Japan. The unit deployed to Danang, South Vietnam in July 1965 to support the 1st MAW in Southeast Asia. The Squadron remained in Danang until April 1971 when it returned to MCAS Iwakuni. In 1976, Headquarters Squadron moved with the 1st MAW Headquarters to its current home at Okinawa.

== See also ==
- United States Marine Corps Aviation
- List of United States Marine Corps aviation support squadrons
