= Kitanakagusuku, Okinawa =

Kitanakagusuku 北中城村
- Village
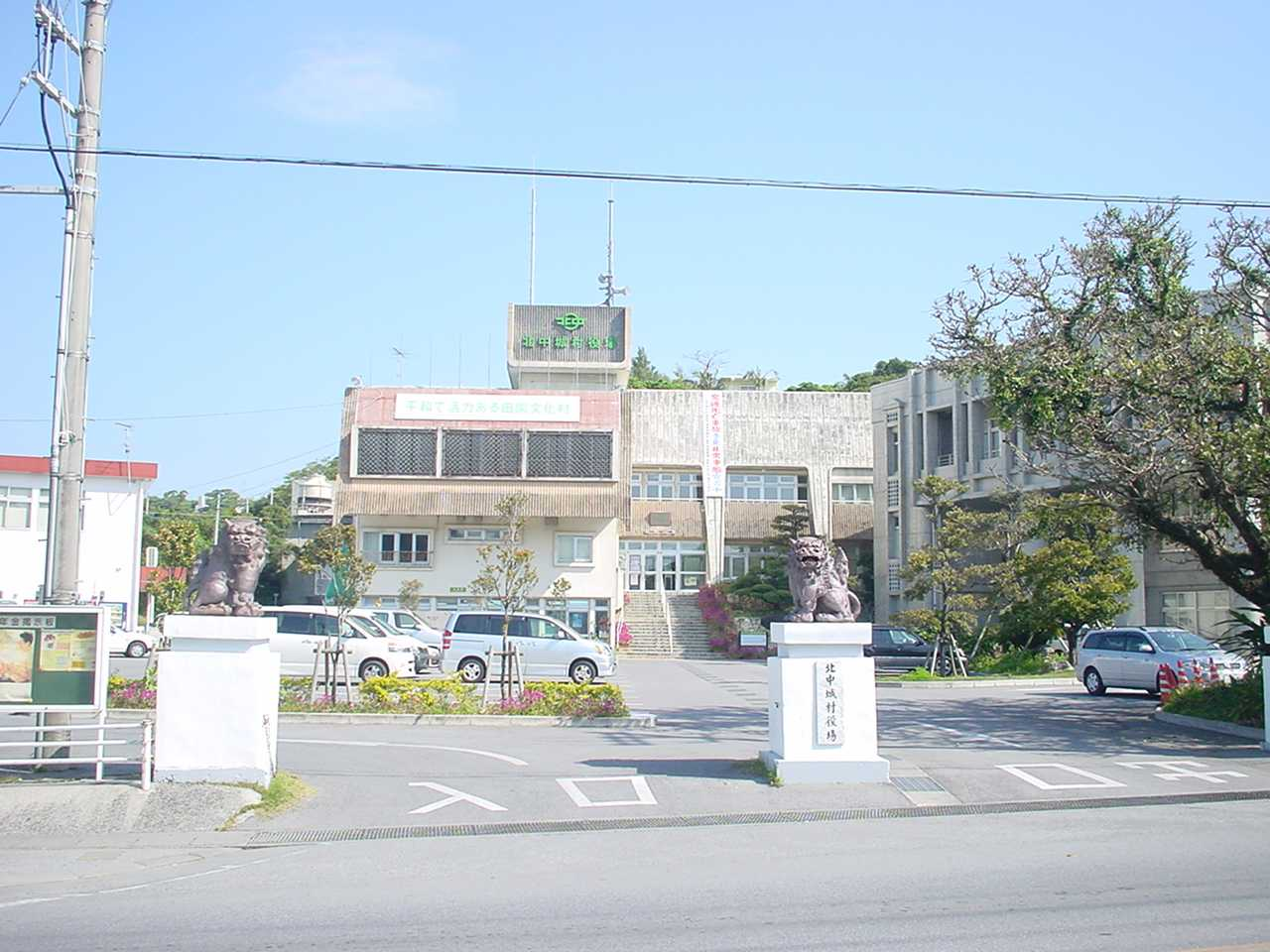
- Kitanakagusuku Village Office

- Flag Emblem

- Location of Kitanakagusuku in Okinawa Prefecture

- Location within Japan
- Coordinates: 26°18′4″N 127°47′35″E
- Country: Japan
- Region: Kyushu
- Prefecture: Okinawa Prefecture
- District: Nakagami

Area
  - Total: 11.53 km^{2} (4.45 sq mi)

Population (October 1, 2020)
  - Total: 17,969
  - Density: 1,558/km^{2} (4,036/sq mi)
- Time zone: UTC+09:00 (JST)
- Website: www.vill.kitanakagusuku.lg.jp

Kitanakagusuku (北中城村, Kitanakagusuku-son; Okinawan: キタナカグシク, romanized: Kitanakagushiku) is a village located in Nakagami District, Okinawa Prefecture, Japan.

As of 1 October 2020, the village has an estimated population of 17,969 and the density of 1,600 persons per km^{2}. The total area is 11.53 km^{2}. It is home to Nakagusuku Castle and the Nakagusuku Hotel ruins.

The village has a large number of centenarians.

== Geography ==
Kitanakagusuku Village is located in the central part of Okinawa Island, along the eastern coast, commanding Nakagusuku Bay. The U.S. military base Camp Foster occupies 14.2% of its area.

=== Administrative divisions ===
The village includes fourteen wards.

- Adaniya (安谷屋)
- Atta (熱田)
- Chunjun (仲順)
- Higa (比嘉)
- Kishaba (喜舎場)
- Misaki (美崎)
- Ogidō (荻道)
- Ōgusuku (大城)
- Rycom (ライカム)
- Shimabuku (島袋)
- Toguchi (渡口)
- Waniya (和仁屋)
- Yagibaru (屋宜原)
- Zukeran (瑞慶覧)

=== Neighbouring municipalities ===
- Chatan
- Ginowan
- Nakagusuku
- Okinawa

== Education ==
The village has the following municipal schools:

- Kitanakagusuku Junior High School (北中城中学校)
- Kitanagagusuku Elementary School (北中城小学校)
- Shimabuku Elementary School (島袋小学校)

The Okinawa Prefectural Board of Education operates nearby high schools, and the following special schools in Kitanakagusuku:

- Okinawa Prefectural Okinawa School for the Deaf (沖縄県立沖縄ろう学校)
- Okinawa Kenritsu Hanasakishien School (沖縄県立はなさき支援学校)

The Department of Defense Education Activity (DoDEA) operates schools in Camp Foster for children of American military personnel:

- Zukeran Elementary School
- Kubasaki High School

== Cultural Properties ==
- Name (Japanese) (Type of registration)

=== Cultural Properties ===
- Nakamura Family Residence (中村家住宅) (National)
- Sanshin – Yuna Type (三線与那型) (Prefectural)

=== Folk Cultural Properties ===
- Atta Māshirī Tomb (熱田マーシリー) (Municipal)
- Gan'yā Palanquin House of Kishaba (龕屋) (Prefectural)
- Mākā-nu-utaki Sacred Site (マーカーの御嶽) (Municipal)
- Niidukuru Hi-nu-kan (Fire God) (根所火の神) (Prefectural)
- Ogidō Hījā-gā Spring (荻道のヒージャーガー) (Prefectural)
- Sanskrit Stele inscribed "Abiraunken" of Toguchi (渡口の梵字の碑「アビラウンケン」) (Prefectural)
- Stone lion of Kishaba (喜舎場の石獅子) (Prefectural)
- Toguchi-no-tera/ Wanama-no-tera Sacred Site (渡口のテラ) (Prefectural)
- Tomb of Chunjun Ufushu (仲順大主の墓) (Prefectural)
- Tomb of Prince Kishaba (喜舎場公の墓) (Municipal)

=== Historic Sites ===
- Ii-no-utaki / Wana Ugan Praying Site (上の御嶽・和仁屋御願) (Municipal)
- Kishaba Ufukā Spring (喜舎場のウフカー) (Municipal)
- Nasu-no-Utaki Sacred Site (ナスの御嶽) (Municipal)
- Ogidō Shell Mound (荻堂貝塚) (National)
- Ōgusuku Iri-nu-kā Spring (大城のイリヌカー) (Municipal)
- Survey Stone of Toguchi (渡口の印部土手石 (ハル石)) (Municipal)
- Tomb of Nakagusuku Wakamatsu (中城若松の墓) (Municipal)
