= Revelations (The X-Files) =

- The X-Files episode
- Episode no.: Season 3 Episode 11
- Directed by: David Nutter
- Written by: Kim Newton
- Production code: 3X11
- Original air date: December 15, 1995
- Running time: 44 minutes

Guest appearances
- Kevin Zegers as Kevin Kryder; Sam Bottoms as Michael Kryder; Kenneth Welsh as Simon Gates; Michael Berryman as Owen Jarvis; Hayley Tyson as Susan Kryder; R. Lee Ermey as Reverend Patrick Findley

Episode chronology
← Previous "731"	Next → "War of the Coprophages"
- The X-Files season 3

"Revelations" is the eleventh episode of the third season of the science fiction television series The X-Files. It premiered on the Fox network on December 15, 1995. It was written by Kim Newton and directed by David Nutter, and featured guest appearances by R. Lee Ermey, Kevin Zegers, Sam Bottoms, Michael Berryman, and Kenneth Welsh. The episode is a "Monster-of-the-Week" story, unconnected to the series' wider mythology. "Revelations" earned a Nielsen household rating of 10, being watched by 15.25 million people in its initial broadcast. The episode received mixed to positive reviews.

The show centers on FBI special agents Fox Mulder (David Duchovny) and Dana Scully (Gillian Anderson) who work on cases linked to the paranormal, called X-Files. Mulder is a believer in the paranormal, while the skeptical Scully has been assigned to debunk his work. In this episode, Mulder and Scully investigate a case where fake stigmatics are being murdered. When a boy shows signs of being a real stigmatic, Mulder and Scully attempt to protect him, fearing that he will be the latest victim.

"Revelations" became a minor storyline milestone for the series with the exploration of Scully's faith as a Roman Catholic. Throughout the remainder of the series, her Catholic faith served as a cornerstone, although at times a contradiction to her otherwise rigid skepticism of the paranormal. Furthermore, while Mulder is usually the believer and Scully is usually the skeptic, "Revelations" features a role reversal with Scully becoming the believer and Mulder becoming the skeptic, a move that Duchovny called "a refreshing change of pace."

== Plot ==
A minister named Reverend Patrick Findley (R. Lee Ermey) in Waynesburg, Pennsylvania fakes stigmatic injuries to his hands during a sermon. Afterwards, Reverend Findley is visited by a white-haired man named Simon Gates, who strangles him—his hands smoking while he does so. Agents Fox Mulder (David Duchovny) and Dana Scully (Gillian Anderson) investigate the case. Mulder says that the minister was the eleventh fake stigmatic who has been killed over the past three years in a series of international murders. Meanwhile, at an elementary school in Loveland, Ohio, a boy, Kevin Kryder starts bleeding from the palms of his hands. The agents arrive and meet with a social worker, who claims that Kevin has suffered injuries before and that his father was institutionalized, adding that Kevin was in danger from evil forces. The agents visit Kevin's father, who claims that his son is the chosen one and that evil forces will come to kill him as part of a great war "between good and evil".

Kevin is abducted by a strange-looking bald man. Kevin's mother recognizes the man's description as that of Owen Jarvis (Michael Berryman), who had done yard work for the family in the past. Owen claims to be Kevin's guardian angel. As the agents arrive, Kevin mysteriously disappears. Owen claims he was asked by God to protect Kevin and criticizes Scully for her faith not being as strong as his. Owen jumps out the window and escapes. Kevin arrives at his home and is pursued by Gates, who kills Owen when he arrives to protect Kevin. Scully performs an autopsy and finds that Owen's corpse is not decaying, reminding her of "incorruptibles" that she learned about in Catechism. Mulder tells Scully to not let her faith cloud her judgment. Scully finds that handprints on Owen's neck belong to Simon Gates, a rich and powerful executive.

Kevin travels with his mother in a car which breaks down. Gates arrives offering to help fix the car, and Kevin, who appears in two places at once, is able to distract him and help them escape. However, Kevin's mother - becoming faint after being hurt by Gates - runs the car into a ditch and dies as a result. Scully tells Kevin she'll protect him. They bring him to a hotel where Scully notices an additional wound on Kevin's side. Scully becomes upset that Mulder will not even consider that a miracle is possible. As they talk, Gates breaks into the bathroom, kidnapping Kevin by prying an opening in the barred window. Scully returns to see Kevin's father but finds him heavily drugged.

Scully theorizes that Gates has brought Kevin to a recycling plant he owns in Jerusalem, Ohio. Mulder thinks that he has headed to the airport, as a man matching Gates' description was reported headed there. Mulder thinks Scully believes that she's been chosen to protect Kevin. Scully arrives at the recycling plant where Gates tells Kevin that he must die for the 'New Age' to come. Gates attempts to jump into a paper shredding machine with Kevin, but Kevin grabs on to the side as Gates falls into the shredder and is killed. Scully is able to pull Kevin to safety. Two days later, Scully and Kevin say goodbye; Kevin tells Scully he'll see her again.

Scully goes to confession for the first time in six years, admitting that she was raised a Catholic but has drifted away from the Church since then. She admits to being unsettled by the things she has witnessed, and even more unsettled by the fact that Mulder, usually the more credulous of the two of them, has not seen them. The priest advises her "Sometimes we must come full circle to find the truth" (unconsciously echoing the recycling symbol Scully has seen several times earlier in the episode) and asks her if she is starting to doubt her own judgment. Scully says that mostly it makes her afraid: that if miracles really do occur, then that means "God is speaking... but that no one's listening."

== Production ==
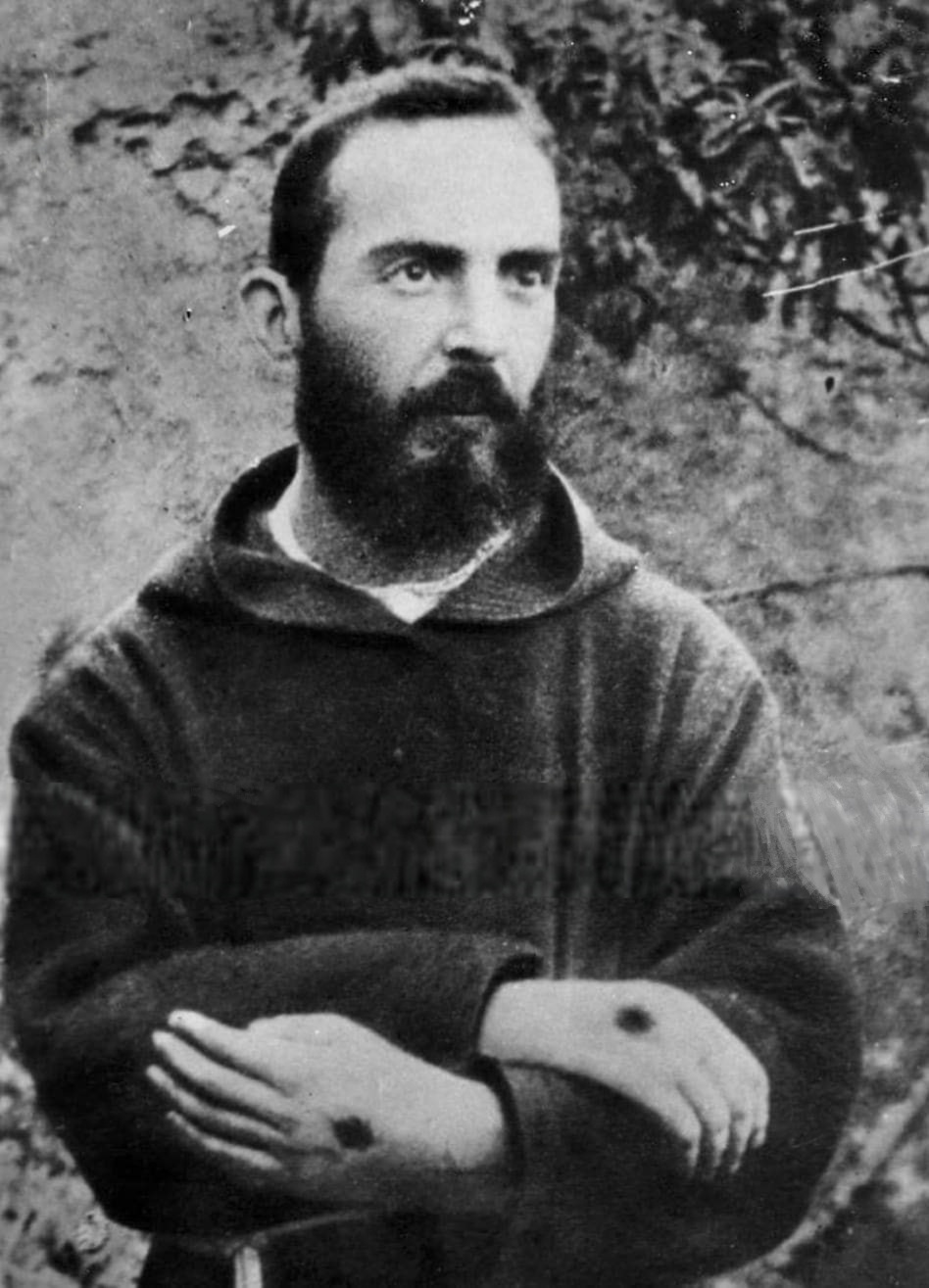
The presence of the stigmata in the episode was inspired by Padre Pio.

"Revelations" was written by Kim Newton and directed by David Nutter, his final episode of The X-Files. Nutter decided that, after the episode, he wished to pursue different things and that the series was in excellent hands with fellow directors Rob Bowman and Kim Manners. Actor Kenneth Welsh, who appears in the episode as the demonic Simon Gates, had previously portrayed a chief antagonist in the critically acclaimed 1990 serial drama Twin Peaks, alongside Duchovny.

The episode contains a role reversal with Dana Scully the believer and Fox Mulder the skeptic, which David Duchovny called "a refreshing change of pace." Nutter believed that by examining faith, the show's creators were able to explore the nuances and seeming contradictions of Scully and her worldview. The episode was the first to discuss Scully's faith in-depth. Series creator Chris Carter later emphasized that the theme of the episode was more on personal belief rather than organized religion, noting, "[The episode] deals with faith, not religion with a capital 'R' or Catholicism with a capital 'C'". The producers for the series were cautious about presenting an overtly religious episode of the series for fear of "pissing certain people off", but, according to Carter, the show "handled it in such a way as to make it about miracle belief, or lack of belief."

According to co-producer Paul Rabwin, the episode had been rewritten a number of times, even when it was already in production. The producers felt it was difficult "to sell the concept of religious magic" (for instance, bi-locating). The episode went through a detailed editing process, including additional tweaks to the script. These changes required actor Kevin Zegers to fly back to Vancouver and film reshoots and additional scenes. The producers claimed to be in awe by the way the episode turned out after all the additional work had been done. Several of the scenes were altered or cut during post-production, such as the scene with the priest; the producers were unhappy with the voice of the actor, so they recorded a voice-over and mixed it in during post-production. A scene with Kevin's father speaking in tongues, quoting the famous "Klaatu barada nikto" line from The Day the Earth Stood Still (1951), was cut in the final edit of the episode.

== Reception ==
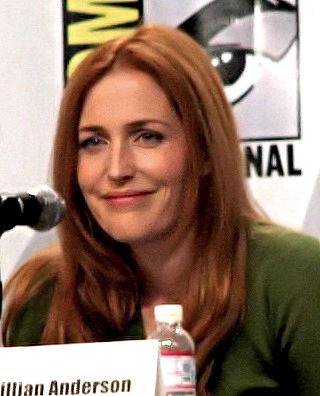
Many critics wrote positively of Gillian Anderson's performance in the episode.

"Revelations" premiered on the Fox network on December 15, 1995. This episode earned a Nielsen rating of 10, with a 17 share, meaning that roughly 10 percent of all television-equipped households, and 17 percent of households watching television, were tuned in to the episode. This totaled 15.25 million viewers.

Critical reception to the episode was moderately positive. Zack Handlen from The A.V. Club gave the episode a B+ and wrote positively of Scully's portrayal, noting "Really, this works best as a Scully episode. I prefer Darin Morgan's version of the character [...], but I doubt that version could support a full episode about God in the same way that this more searching, and lost, Scully does." However, Handlen was critical of some of the religious aspects of the episode, noting that "If there's a Christian God in the X-Files universe, doesn't that trump just about everything else that Mulder and Scully have spent their time on? ... There are too many implications here for the show to support, and while it doesn't destroy the episode, it does make it difficult for me to back it as fully as I'd like to." John Keegan from Critical Myth gave the episode a 7 out of 10 rating, noting "Overall, this episode highlights Scully and her faith, and in the process, manages to presage many of the future plot developments for the series and her character. The spiritual war at the foundation of the series mythology is reflected in a situation that speaks directly to Scully and her upbringing, and though some of the religious metaphors are heavy-handed, it works well enough."

Entertainment Weekly gave the episode a B+ and wrote positively of the episode's "inventiveness," which "derives from its choice of the most mainstream paranormality of all—Christianity." The review also wrote positively of the Mulder-Scully role reversal, calling the change "always welcome". Paula Vitaris from Cinefantastique gave the episode a moderately positive review and awarded it two-and-a-half stars out of four. She noted that "Scully's search to reconcile her religious beliefs and her scientific training makes for powerful drama, and Gillian Anderson is up to the challenge." Vitaris, however, criticized elements of the plot, most notably the "un-saintly" quality of Kevin and Kevin's lack of emotion after his mother is killed. Furthermore, she called the ending "a real mess". Not all reviews were positive. Robert Shearman, in his book Wanting to Believe: A Critical Guide to The X-Files, Millennium & The Lone Gunmen, rated the episode two stars out of five, calling it a "peculiarly bloodless episode". The author criticized the fact that many of Kevin's powers were only helpful in certain isolated scenes, such as his ability to bilocate. Shearman concluded that the show should "take a serious subject by all means, but then take the subject seriously."

Director David Nutter was pleased with the finished product. He was most notably happy with Anderson's acting, saying that she delivered a sparkling performance, particularly in the final scene. He also stated "I really love working with Gillian. She's got such an ability to emote and give from the inside."

Actor Michael Berryman has said that this was his favorite role in his career, and he credits it for reversing typecasting that always put him in the role of the monster.

== Bibliography ==
- Edwards, Ted (1996). X-Files Confidential. Little, Brown and Company. ISBN 0-316-21808-1.
- Hurwitz, Matt; Knowles, Chris (2008). The Complete X-Files. Insight Editions. ISBN 978-1933784809.
- Lowry, Brian (1996). Trust No One: The Official Guide to the X-Files. Harper Prism. ISBN 0-06-105353-8.
- Shearman, Robert (2009). Wanting to Believe: A Critical Guide to The X-Files, Millennium & The Lone Gunmen. Mad Norwegian Press. ISBN 978-0-9759446-9-1.
