= Lock n' Load with R. Lee Ermey =

- Lock N' Load with R. Lee Ermey DVD cover
- Also known as: Lock n' Load
- Genre: Reality television
- Created by: R. Lee Ermey
- Developed by: Simon J. Heath
- Written by: Simon J. Heath
- Creative director: Simon J. Heath
- Presented by: R. Lee Ermey
- Starring: R. Lee Ermey
- Original language: English
- No. of seasons: 1
- No. of episodes: 13

Production
- Executive producer: Geoff Fitzpatrick
- Running time: 60 minutes
- Production company: Beyond Productions

Original release
- Network: History
- Release: July 26 – November 13, 2009

Lock n' Load with R. Lee Ermey is a reality television series about the development of military weaponry throughout the centuries. Hosted by actor and former U.S. Marine drill instructor R. Lee Ermey, its one season originally aired on the History channel in 2009.

== Format ==
In a typical episode, Ermey focused on one specific type of weapon or weapon system, presenting key advancements in its technology and demonstrating their use with the help of experts. In a holdover from his duties hosting Mail Call on the History Channel, he frequently added humor in the form of light-hearted drill instructor haranguing aimed at the viewer. He also displayed an eagerness to try out the episode's relevant weapons against a wide range of targets, particularly watermelons ("they taste better after being shot with a machine gun"), as well as glass bottles.

The series was produced by Simon J. Heath, who also developed the concept.

== Episodes ==
The pilot episode first aired in December 2008. This rated well and was followed by a series in 2009. The show premiered on July 26, 2009 and only ran for one season and was cancelled in November 2009.

1. "Artillery"
2. "Machine Guns"
3. "Tanks"
4. "Pistols"
5. "Helicopters" (filmed at Yakima Firing Center in Yakima, Washington)
6. "Armored Vehicles"
7. "Shotguns"
8. "Rockets"
9. "Blades"
10. "Ammo"
11. "Rifles"
12. "MG2" (Machine Guns, part 2)
13. "Bunker Busters" (military demolition)
