= Camp Foster =

U.S. Marine Corps facility in Okinawa, Japan

Coordinates: 26°18′5″N 127°46′47″E

- Okinawa Island, Japan
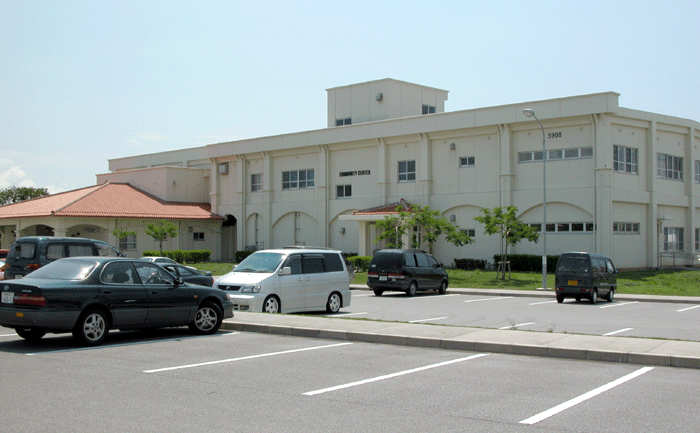
- The community center at Camp Foster.

Site information
- Type: Military base
- Owner: United States
- Operator: United States Marine Corps
- Controlled by: USMC

Location
- Location within Japan

Camp Foster (Japanese: キャンプ・フォスター), formerly known as Camp Zukeran, is a United States Marine Corps base located in Ginowan City with portions overlapping into Okinawa City, Chatan, and Kitanakagusuku on the Japanese prefecture of Okinawa Island. Camp Foster is known as one of the primary bases in the Marine Corps Base Camp Smedley D. Butler complex.

== Description ==
Some of Camp Foster's area overlaps with Okinawa City, Chatan and Kitanakagusuku in the Japanese prefecture of Okinawa Island. It houses the headquarters of Marine Corps Base Butler, Marine Corps Installations Pacific and the Okinawa Area Field Office of United States Forces Japan. It was named after the Medal of Honor recipient PFC William A. Foster.

The base contains a large AAFES store with an adjacent food court. The building's Four Seasons annex next to the large store contains a nail salon, barber shop, soft bank, AU, and a toy land. Near the base commissary is a bowling alley, skate park, performing arts center and movie theater. The base contains several neighborhoods, including Kishaba, Chatan, Futenma, Plaza and Sada.

== Environmental investigation ==
In October 2013, Japanese officials entered the base with US permission to look for buried cultural properties. They discovered dozens of abandoned metal drums, but did not report this to the Ginowan city's mayor until March 2014. Members of the Japanese defense ministry's local bureau and Ginowan city visually inspected the site, as part of its cultural property research and "no unusual odor or color change in soil" was detected. Also apparently no health problems have been actively "reported by residents living around the base". Ginowan city government had called the Japanese defense ministry's to investigate for "possible environmental impacts". The Japanese Minister of Defense at the time, Itsunori Onodera responded saying: "We will take appropriate measures in cooperation with the United States and the city of Ginowan" as they plan environmental studies on soil in the week of 18 March 2014. The United States rarely allow environmental inspections on U.S. bases not planned for return to Japan.

== Land Return ==
The Futenma housing area of the base originally was to be returned to Japan between 2001 and 2003, 5–7 years from 1996. In 2006, the Nishi-Futenma housing area at Camp Foster was vacated and slated for return to Japan, but Japanese concerns of contamination stalled the transfer. For example, bungalows in the military housing area built in the 1950s were insulated with asbestos. Per the U.S.-Japan Status of Forces Agreement from 1960 the U.S. military is not responsible for the remediation of land polluted by its bases in Japan. Because the central government has not challenged the dated agreement, the Okinawa Prefectural Assembly created its own special committee regarding U.S. bases, to collect information directly about past use and storage of chemicals. In October 2013, it created a department of pollution, which would circumvent the central government and its environmental investigations, which some believe are not interested in communicating the true levels of pollution.

On 31 March 2015 the West Futenma housing area on Camp Foster was returned to Okinawa Prefecture, reducing and consolidating land used by the U.S. military. A 20-hectare part of the area is earmarked for a medical division with plans to build a prefecture administered advanced heavy particle cancer therapy facility. The University of the Ryukyus Faculty of Medicine, including the University Hospital, is also scheduled to move from its current location in Nishihara into a new facility to be constructed on the land.

== Education ==
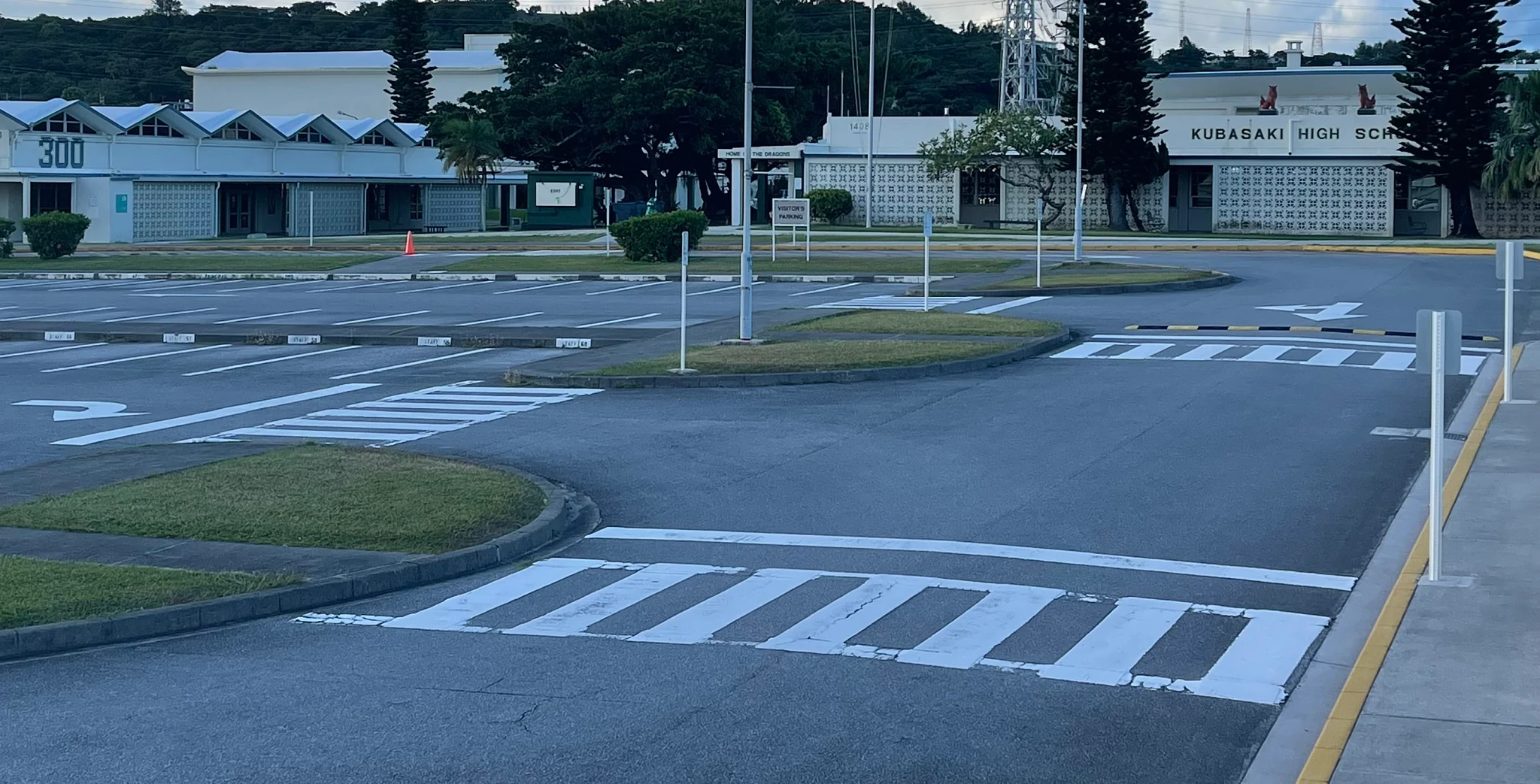
Kubasaki High School

Camp Foster operates three schools; Zukeran and Edward C. Killin elementary schools, and Kubasaki High School facing the Sada housing complex. Middle-school age children who live on the base attend Lester Middle School on its eponymous host military base, Camp Lester.

== Tenant units ==
- 3rd Medical Battalion
- Marine Wing Support Group 17
- Marine Wing Headquarters Squadron 1
- Marine Wing Communications Squadron 18
- Combat Logistics Regiment 3
- 3d Transportation Battalion
- US Naval Hospital, Okinawa
- Marine Wing Support Squadron 172

== Related ==
- List of United States Marine Corps bases
- United States Forces Japan
