= Senator Fink =

Senator Fink may refer to:

- Bill Fink (born 1955), Iowa State Senate
- Olaf Fink (1914–1973), Louisiana State Senate
