= Marine Wing Support Squadron 172 =

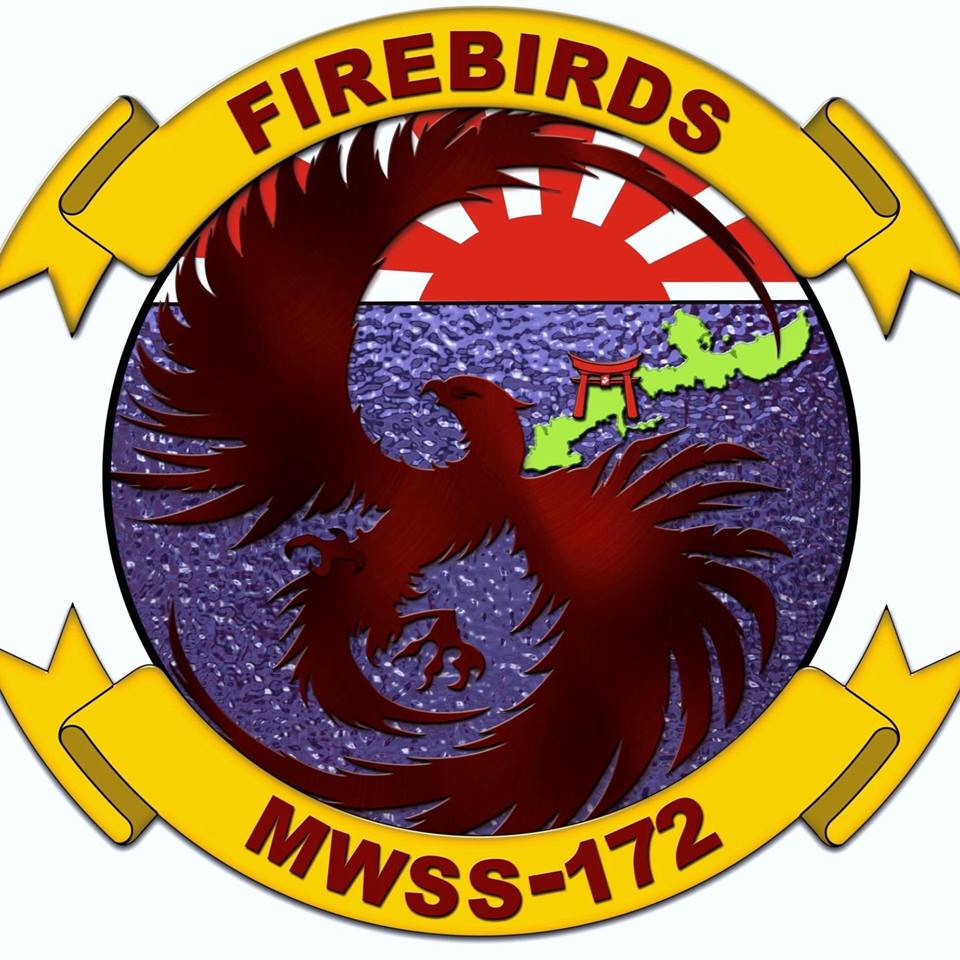
- MWSS-172 Insignia
- Active: 16 June 1986 – present
- Country: United States
- Allegiance: United States of America
- Branch: United States Marine Corps
- Type: Aviation ground support squadron
- Size: 350+
- Part of: Marine Aircraft Group 36; 1st Marine Aircraft Wing
- Garrison/HQ: Camp Foster
- Nickname: "Firebirds"
- Motto: Committed to Excellence

Commanders
- Current commander: LtCol Allan T. Moyer
- Notable commanders: MajGen Tracy W. King; BGen Nick I. Brown

Marine Wing Support Squadron 172 (MWSS 172) is an aviation support unit of the United States Marine Corps's 1st Marine Aircraft Wing. Known as the "Firebirds", they are based out of Camp Foster, Okinawa, Japan. Previously part of Marine Wing Support Group 17 before they disbanded, MWSS-172 now falls under Marine Aircraft Group 36.

== Mission ==
Provide all essential Aviation Ground Support (AGS) requirements to a Marine Aviation Combat Element. Additionally, an implied mission is to supplement airbase facilities and services at a collocated Marine Corps Air Station, which is performed aboard MCAS Futenma.

== History ==
Marine Wing Support Squadron 172 (MWSS-172) was activated on 16 June 1986 at Marine Corps Air Station Futenma, Okinawa, Japan immediately upon the deactivation of Wing Transportation Squadron 17, Wing Engineer Squadron 17, and Marine Air Base Squadron 36.

The Squadron's primary mission at that time was to provide all essential AGS requirements to a designated rotary-wing component of a Marine Aviation Combat Element. Additionally, an implied mission was to supplement air base facilities and services aboard Marine Corps Air Station (MCAS) Futenma.

Since its inception, MWSS-172 has successfully supported numerous missions and requests for assistance throughout the globe. Throughout 1987, the Squadron continually increased its table of organization and equipment, adding numerous pieces of motor transport and engineer equipment to its inventory. During the last months of 1988, Marine Wing Support Squadron 174 relocated to Kaneohe Bay, Hawaii and left Marine Wing Support Squadron 172 as the sole Marine Wing Support Squadron on Okinawa.

During the fall of 1989, MWSS-172 constructed the Vertical Short Take-Off and Landing (VSTOL) facility on Ie Shima island with Marines and equipment from 1st Bulk Fuel Company, 9th Engineer Support Battalion; the only such facility in the Western Pacific. The squadron has since performed regular maintenance and upgrades to this facility, enhancing mission readiness across 1st Marine Aircraft Wing.

In 1991, the Squadron attached a large contingent of Marines to Special Purpose MAGTF 2-91. While assigned there, they provided Humanitarian assistance in Operations Sea Angel for the typhoon that devastated Bangladesh and Fiery Vigil in the Republic of Philippines that assisted with the evacuation of Department of Defense civilians and personnel from the effects of the volcanic eruption of Mount Pinatubo.

In January 1993, a group of MWSS-172 Marines deployed to Somalia in support of Operation Restore Hope. In September 1996, Squadron Marines and Sailors once again met the operational challenges when they supported Operation PACIFIC HAVEN, which provided medical care and humanitarian assistance to 6,600 Kurdish evacuees brought to Guam for political asylum.

In July 1993, Marines from the 3d Force Service Support Group and Marine Wing Support Squadron (MWSS) 172 participated in Exercise Freedom Banner near Pohang, Korea. During the exercise, Typhoon "Faye" touched down southwest of the Sea of Japan port city of Pohang. MWSS-172 provided weather support to all Marine aviation assets, issued warnings, and conducted weather briefs.

Participated in exercises COBRA GOLD 96 and FREEDOM BANNER 96 (a maritime prepositioning force (MPF) exercise) in the Kingdom of Thailand. These two exercises were conducted concurrently and ran from March to July, including strategic lift windows.

Throughout February and March 1996, MWSS-172 reconfigured the VSTOL strip on Ie Shima to simulate the deck of an amphibious assault ship. In October and November of the same year, the Squadron returned to Ie Shima to construct a control tower, complete with a state of the art Close-In Approach Indicator Guidance System.

From 1999 through 2001, MWSS-172 relocated from MCAS Futenma to Marine Corps Base (MCB) Camp Foster and continued to support MCAS Futenma and Marine Aircraft Group 36 (MAG-36) with outstanding AGS.

Since the Al Qaeda terror attacks on 11 September 2001, MWSS-172 has had an active role in the Global War on Terrorism. For four months following the attacks, the squadron provided Air Base Ground Defense (ABGD) to MCAS Futenma. Additionally, the squadron provided critical support to several operations throughout the Global War on Terror; most notably, Operations Noble Eagle, Enduring Freedom and Iraqi Freedom. Simultaneously, the squadron continued to participate in multiple Joint Task Force (JTF) Humanitarian Assistance and Disaster Relief (HA/DR) Operations throughout the Pacific Command Area of Responsibility.

From October to December 2003, MWSS-172 took on the challenging task of completely replacing all 432,648 square feet of AM-2 matting on the Ie Shima VSTOL pad. Then, from September to November 2004, the Squadron resurfaced the 5,500-foot coral runway also located on the island. In December 2004, a tsunami hit Indonesia, destroying critical infrastructure and leaving large portions of the local national population homeless. MWSS-172 responded immediately and provided personnel and equipment in support of the HA/DR mission.

In 2006, the entire Squadron deployed for the first time in over ten years to the Korean Peninsula in support of the annual combined field training exercise (FTX) Foal Eagle. In addition, the squadron deployed to both Fort Magsaysay and Clark Air Base in the Republic of Philippines for Talon Vision 07. These two exercises validated the unit's capability to deploy as a squadron into an austere environment, establish a footprint, and then fulfil all functions of AGS which allowed air combat power to project forward.

From January to March 2008, MWSS-172 made final preparations for the unit's deployment to Iraq in support of Operation Iraqi Freedom. Over the seven-month period, MWSS-172 Firebirds were deployed to the Al Anbar Province supporting one major air base, numerous Forward Operating Bases (FOB), and Forward Arming and Refueling Points (FARP). They maintained a consistently high operational tempo supporting 3d MAW (FWD) and Multi-National Forces-West (MNF-W) in the Central Command Theater of Operations. The unit provided AGS, combat service support, and conducted other related tasks in order to support the full spectrum of combat operations across the Marine Corps Air-Ground Task Force (MAGTF). Relief-in-place was conducted with MWSS-273. The Transfer of Authority occurred on 12 October 2008.

Upon return from OIF 08.1, MWSS-172 continued to influence the multiple nations within U.S. Pacific Command (PACOM). MWSS-172 worked closely with allied and friendly nations to build partner capacity through annual readiness exercises and Theater Security Cooperation activities. The squadron also responded to natural disasters by providing aid to victims and internal support to affected governments.

Immediately following the devastating earthquake and subsequent tsunami that hit mainland Japan in 2011, the squadron provided personnel and equipment to the 31st Marine Expeditionary Unit (MEU) for HA/DR operations in support of Operation Tomodachi.

From July to August 2013, the Engineer Operations and Airfield Operations companies constructed four coral improved, AM-2 matted, 96-foot by 96-foot landing zone (LZ) pads and two coral improved LZ pads at the Ie Shima Training Area. These LZ's enabled division-sized landing operations for both tilt-rotor and rotary-wing aircraft. In addition to the six pads, the Marines also resurfaced the 5,500 ft coral runway in order to support operations for KC-130J aircraft and any additional fixed-wing assets.

In the wake of Typhoon Haiyan in November 2013, that devastated the southern islands in the Republic of the Philippines, the Marines and Sailors of MWSS-172 were some of the first responders from III MEF to provide HA/DR to the displaced citizens that were affected by the storm. The squadron provided personnel and additional equipment in support of Operation DAMAYAN that assisted the Marine Expeditionary Brigade (MEB) and the Air Combat Element (ACE) with their missions in the form of provisional security, airfield support functions, a FARP located at Guiuan and specialized medical assistance.

To decrease the response time in support of any PACOM mission, the squadron conducts internal readiness exercises throughout the year to test response times in the event of a contingency operation.

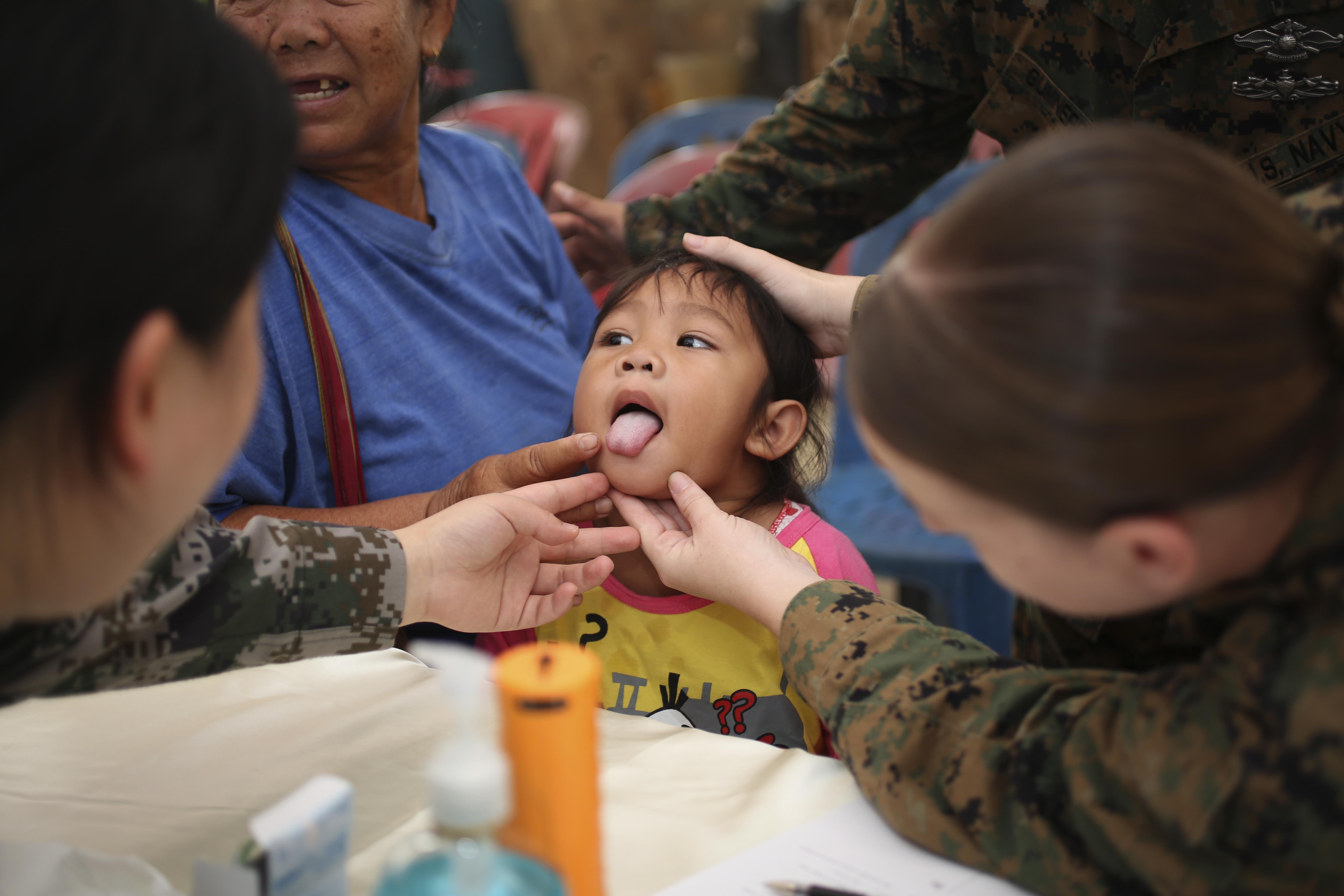
Ziraphinya Somari, center, sticks her tongue out for multinational medical professionals during a cooperative health engagement in Sukhothai, Thailand, 13 February 2014, during exercise Cobra Gold 2014.

Annually, the Firebirds deploy Marines and Sailors to the Kingdom of Thailand and to the Republic of the Philippines in support of Exercises Cobra Gold, PHIBLEX, and Balikitan. Since 1986 the Squadron has participated in the following exercises: Team Spirit, Valiant Blitz, Cope Thunder, Bear Hunt, Balikatan, Golden Eagle, Cobra Gold, JTF Full Accounting, Freedom Banner, Jigsaw, Beachcrest, Evergreen, Cloud Warrior, Valiant Usher, Ulchi Focus Lens, Dragon Slayer, Korean Integrated Training Program, Hawaiian Combined Arms Exercise, Southern Frontier, Millennium Edge, Talon Vision, Crocodile, Foal Eagle, Ryukyu Warrior, Coral Tiger, Wolmi Do Fury, Cambodia Interoperability Program, Talisman Saber, Khaan Quest, Southern Frontier, Sea Angel, Fiery Vigil, Pacific Haven, Bangladesh Interoperability Program, Damayan, Philippine Bi-Lateral Exercise (PHIBLEX), and multiple JTF HA/DR Operations.

In addition to its primary mission of supporting the 1st Marine Aircraft Wing's Aviation Combat Element, the squadron provides operational forces for Operation Enduring Freedom, participates in various annual training exercises across PACOM, and conducts airfield operations on four Marine Corps Base Japan installations. The Squadron currently maintains the following: a High Powered Run-Up (HPRU) at Kadena Air Base, seven V/TOL pads, four AM-2 matted LZ pads, two improved LZ pads, an active 5,500-foot coral runway and a simulated Landing Helicopter Dock (LHD) deck constructed of AM-2 matting at the Ie Shima Training Area.

== See also ==
- Organization of the United States Marine Corps
- List of United States Marine Corps aviation support units
- United States Marine Corps Aviation
