= Mail Call (TV series) =

- Season 2 DVD cover
- Starring: R. Lee Ermey
- Country of origin: United States
- Original language: English

Production
- Executive producers: Robert Kirk & Rob Lihani
- Running time: 30 to 60 minutes

Original release
- Network: History Channel
- Release: August 4, 2002 – 2009

Mail Call is a television program that aired on the History Channel. It was hosted by R. Lee Ermey, a retired United States Marine Corps staff sergeant and honorary gunnery sergeant. The show debuted on August 4, 2002 as part of the "Fighting Fridays" lineup. Most episodes were 30 minutes, but from 2007 through the show's end in 2009 some episodes were 60 minutes.

== Description ==
During each episode, Ermey read and answered questions submitted by viewers regarding weapons, equipment, customs, and terminology used by all branches of the U.S. military now or in the past, as well as by other armed forces in history. Ermey often took his viewers on location to military training areas to film demonstrations and consult with experts. When not on location, Ermey broadcast from a set resembling a military outpost, including a tent, a Jeep, and various other pieces of military gear which changed throughout the series. At times, he would also have a bulldog – usually symbolic of Marines – on his show as well.

Ermey often provided comic relief in the form of light-hearted DI-style verbal abuse aimed at viewers; testing the effects of weapons on assorted objects (most often watermelons, which he described as his "sworn enemy"); and occasional appearances of "Mini-Lee", an action figure styled in Ermey's likeness, often seen berating a luckless G.I. Joe figure. His demeanor in character as host was similar to that of Gunnery Sergeant Hartman, the character he portrayed in the Stanley Kubrick film Full Metal Jacket. However, he only showed this attitude toward viewers, such as ordering them to return in time for the end of a commercial break.

The program had several DVD video releases, including selected episodes from the first seven seasons, as well as a blooper video called Mail Call: S.N.A.F.U. Reruns continue to be aired on the Military History Channel.

== Show name origin ==
The title of Mail Call for the series was drawn from the military practice of the same name, in which soldiers assemble to receive mail from a designated person who calls out each recipient's name in turn.

== See also ==
- Lock n' Load with R. Lee Ermey, a show with a similar premise which Ermey also hosted.
