= TRU-SPEC =

American brand of clothing

Tru-Spec
- Type: Private
- Industry: Manufacturing, apparel
- Founded: 1950; 76 years ago
- Headquarters: Kings Mountain NC, United States
- Products: Clothing, accessories
- Owner: Tru Spec Global LLC
- Number of employees: Over 1,000 (2013)
- Website: www.truspec.com

Tru-Spec is an American brand of tactical clothing and equipment owned by Atlanco, providing uniforms for military, law enforcement and public safety personnel. In addition to its on-duty gear, the company also manufactures casual and off-duty apparel.

The name Tru-Spec reflects the company's original focus on manufacturing uniforms that met the U.S. Government's "true specifications" by utilizing military-specification mil-spec fabrics. The brand subsequently expanded its product line from core military garments to include outdoor, public safety, and law enforcement apparel.

In May 2024, Tru-Spec relocated its operations to North Carolina. The corporate headquarters is now located in Kings Mountain, North Carolina, and it operates alongside an 85,000-square-foot distribution center in Grover, North Carolina.

== Products ==
Some of the TRU-SPEC brand products include:

- Battle Dress Uniforms (BDUs)
- Army Combat Uniforms (ACUs)
- Tactical pants
- Uniforms
- Cordura baselayer systems
- Flight suits
- Backpacks
- Belts
- Boots
- Caps

In 2011, actor and retired Marine drill instructor R. Lee Ermey became the official spokesperson for TRU-SPEC, and assisted in the design of a new line of tactically inspired apparel.
