= Marine Wing Support Group 17 =

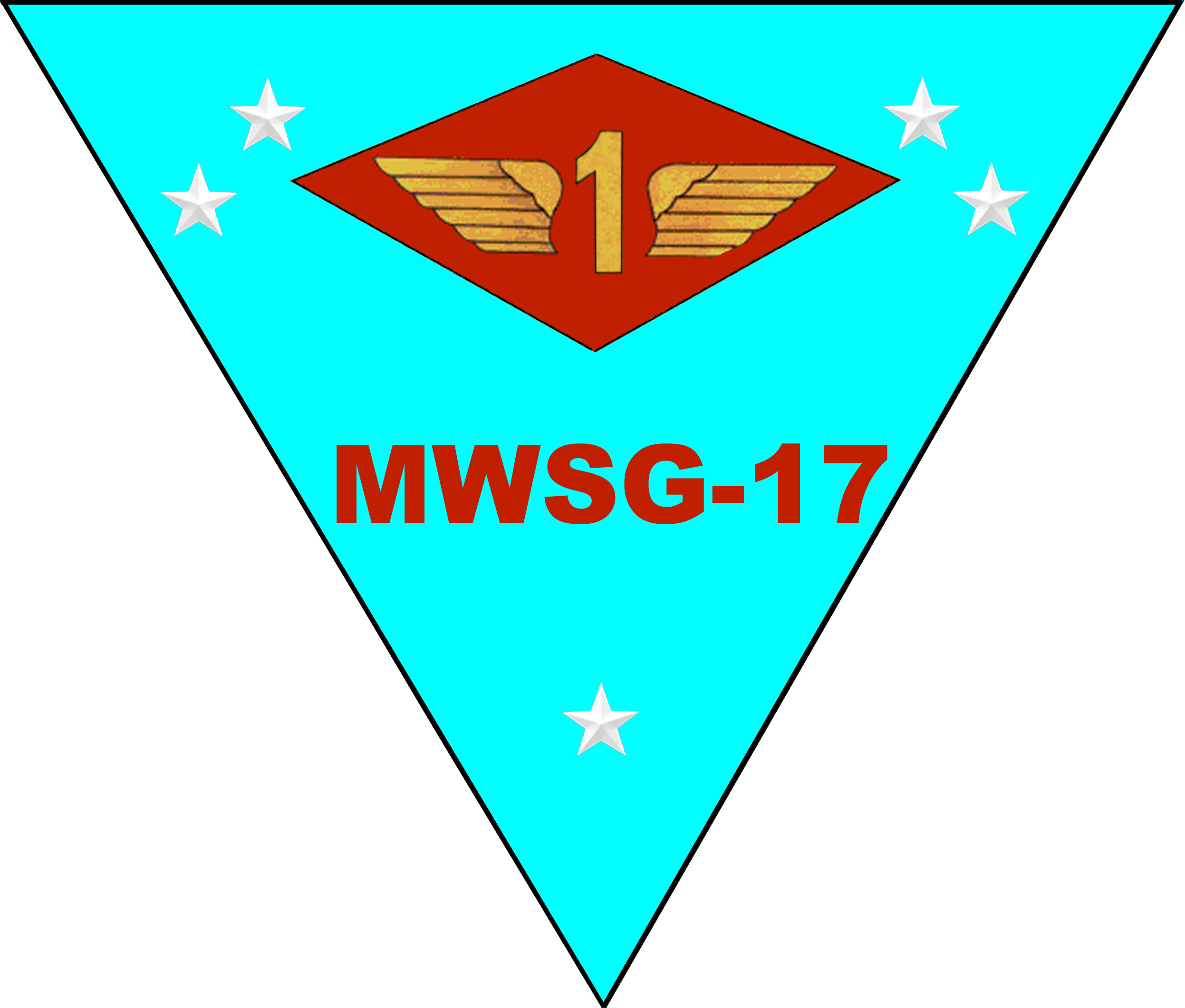
- MWSG-17 insignia
- Active: 1 July 1953 – 4 June 2012
- Country: United States
- Allegiance: United States of America
- Branch: United States Marine Corps
- Role: Aviation combat service support
- Part of: Inactive
- Garrison/HQ: Camp Foster
- Engagements: Vietnam War

Marine Wing Support Group 17 (MWSG-17) was a United States Marine Corps aviation ground support unit based at Marine Corps Base Camp Butler, Japan. They were composed of two squadrons that provided the 1st Marine Aircraft Wing (1st MAW) and III Marine Expeditionary Force with complete airfield operation services (less air traffic control), engineer and transportation support, medical assistance, food services, security support, and other direct combat and combat service support to the Aviation Combat Element. The Group was disbanded on 4 June 2012 and its subordinate units passed to other commands in 1st Marine Aircraft Wing.

== Mission ==
Provide the 1st Marine Aircraft Wing with organic and deployable aviation ground support to contingencies and exercises within the USPACOM area of responsibility.

== Subordinate units ==
- Marine Wing Support Squadron 171
- Marine Wing Support Squadron 172
- Personnel Support Detachment 17

== History ==
Marine Wing Support Group 17 was activated on 1 July 1953 at Itami, Japan and designated as Marine Wing Service Group 17. Later that same year, MWSG-17 was relocated to Marine Corps Air Station Iwakuni, Japan where its Marines served until 1966. That year it was re-designated as Marine Wing Support Group 17 and deployed to the Republic of Vietnam. MWSG-17 actively participated in the Vietnam War from June 1966 until August 1970 while operating from Da Nang Air Base, Vietnam. During this period, the Group earned a Presidential Unit Citation as well as a Meritorious Unit Commendation. In the summer of 1970, MWSG-17 returned home from Vietnam to MCAS Iwakuni. Nine years later, MWSG-17 moved to Okinawa, Japan and took up residence at Camp Foster. The Group was disbanded on 4 June 2012 and its subordinate units passed to other commands in 1st Marine Aircraft Wing.

== See also ==
- Organization of the United States Marine Corps
- List of United States Marine Corps aviation support squadrons
