= Reuben Fink =

Reuben Fink (January 18, 1889 – February 15, 1961) was a Ukrainian-born Jewish American Yiddish author and journalist.

== Life ==
Fink was born on January 18, 1889, in Goshcha, Volhynia Governorate, Russian Empire, the son of Morris Finkelstein and Malka Katz.

Fink immigrated to America in 1903. He attended the College of the City of New York from 1907 to 1910, George Washington University from 1911 to 1916 (receiving a B.A. from there in 1911 and an M.S. in 1913), and American University in 1918. He edited the Washington, D.C. Life in 1911, worked as an editorial writer for the Department of Commerce from 1912 to 1914, introduced Washington correspondence into Yiddish journalism as a correspondent for Der Tog from 1914 to 1919 and Haint in 1920, and served as associate manager (later manager) of Di Tsayt from 1921 to 1922.

Fink received a Teacher's Diploma with his George Washington University B.A. in 1911, and a few months later he was appointed a substitute teacher in white high schools and manual training schools in Washington. In 1914, he legally changed his last name from "Finkelstein" to "Fink" and was transferred from the Census Bureau and became a clerk at the Department of Commerce. In 1915, he resigned as clerk in the Commerce Department and was appointed a high school teacher assigned to the Business High School. He became a founding member of the High School Teachers' Union of Washington, D.C. in 1916, and later that year he was promoted from a probationary teacher at the Business High School to a permanent one. He took a leave of absence from the school in November 1919, and by February 1920 he moved back to New York City.

Fink started working in the insurance and banking business in 1922, becoming assistant agency manager of the Equitable Life Assurance Society in that year. He was president and director of United Trustee Corp., United Thrift Plan Inc. from 1926 to 1936, director of Guaranty Life Insurance Co. of New York from 1930 to 1932, a columnist and contributor of the Seven Arts Feature Syndicate from 1935 to 1937, an employee of Continental Enterprises Inc., Marigold Corp., Fink & Co. Inc. from 1936 to 1941, and chairman of the registrants advisory board of the United States Selective Service from 1941 to 1946. He was also vice-president of the Federation of Ukrainian Jews in America from 1914 to 1924 and the American Union of Romanian Jews from 1915 to 1920, president and founder of the League Against Discrimination in Unemployment in 1937, and a member of the American Jewish Congress advisory committee.

Fink gave up teaching chemistry at the Business High School to focus on the fight for liberal immigration laws. He was one of four Yiddish journalists President Woodrow Wilson invited to the Paris Peace Conference. His literary career began in 1905, when he published a Hebrew translation of Alphonse Daudet's The Last Class in Hadoar. He went on to contribute to Yiddish newspapers all over the world. He wrote a number of Yiddish books, including The American Citizen in 1916, The Constitution and the Declaration of Independence in 1919, How to Bring Relatives to America in 1919, Passports and Visas in 1919, The American War Congress and Zionism in 1919, and America and Palestine in 1944. He also edited the Hoshcha Yizkor book with Abraham Yaron in 1957 and wrote books in English. He and Bernard G. Richards compiled The Jewish Communal Directory of New York.

Fink was a member of B'nai B'rith, the Freemasons, the Brooklyn Chamber of Commerce, the National Press Club, and the Jewish Press Club in New York City. In 1917, he married Dr. Mary Goldfarb. Their daughter was Muriel Joan.

Fink died in New York City on February 15, 1961. He was buried in Mount Hebron Cemetery.
