= Paulette Fink =

French Jewish nurse and resistance fighter

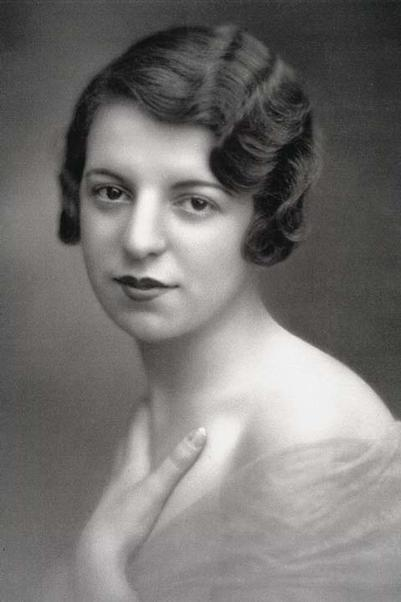
Paulette Fink (c.1931)

Paulette Weill Oppert Fink (1911–2005) was a French-Jewish nurse and resistance worker during the Second World War. She later emigrated to the United States where she helped to raise money in support of the new State of Israel. An executive member of the National Women's Division of the United Jewish Appeal, she was elected chair in December 1960.

== Biography ==
Born on 22 October 1911 in Mulhouse, Paulette Weill was the daughter of Blanche Saloman (1887–1965) and Jean Weill (1876–1965), an entrepreneur who ran a shoe factory. Brought up in an upper-class family in the Alsace city of Mulhouse, Weill studied at the Sorbonne in Paris. In 1934, she married her first husband, the department store owner Yves Oppert, (1909–1944), with whom she had two daughters: Nadine (1935) and Francelyne (1939). In 1940 when the Germans invaded France, the family were living in Paris. Paulette served as a nurse with the Red Cross on the front line while her husband was a lieutenant in the French army. Her parents managed to emigrate to the United States during the war but returned to Paris in 1946.

The Oppert family moved to the village of Izieu in the unoccupied zone of Vichy France where Paulette and her husband joined the French Resistance. Assisted by Christian volunteers, they helped to save some 1,500 Jewish children, mostly from eastern Europe, who had been left behind when their parents were deported by the Germans to concentration camps. After her husband was caught by the Germans and tortured to death in June 1944, Paulette continued to fight for the resistance. When she heard their school had been visited by the Nazis, she took her daughters on her bicycle to be cared for by a pastor in the southern French town of Le Chambon-sur-Lignon. She recalls how helpful the Christian community was in hiding the Jewish children. After the war, working with the Jewish Brigade and the Joint Distribution Committee, she helped to smuggle Jewish refugees into Palestine and established 11 orphanages for abandoned children who had survived the Holocaust. The first of these was at Malmaison, just west of Paris.

Paulette Oppert first travelled to the United States in 1945 to help raise money through the Joint Distribution Committee for her projects and took her first daughter with her. She returned in 1948, raising money for the State of Israel by speaking at meetings and on the radio in 42 states. In 1951, she enrolled her two daughters in the French Lycée in New York City, hoping they could embark on a more normal life.

On 14 September 1954, she married the Minneapolis businessman Israel Fink (1902–1991) whom she had met on a speaking tour. The family settle in Minneapolis together with Paulette's two daughters. Inspired by a trip to Israel, her husband headed the local Jewish Federation and served on the board of the United Jewish Appeal. From 1960, Paulette Fink headed the Women's Division of the United Jewish Appeal for three years.

Paulette Fink died in Minneapolis on 2 April 2005.
