= Kadena High School =

American military base high school in Okinawa, Japan

Coordinates: 26°20′08″N 127°46′52″E

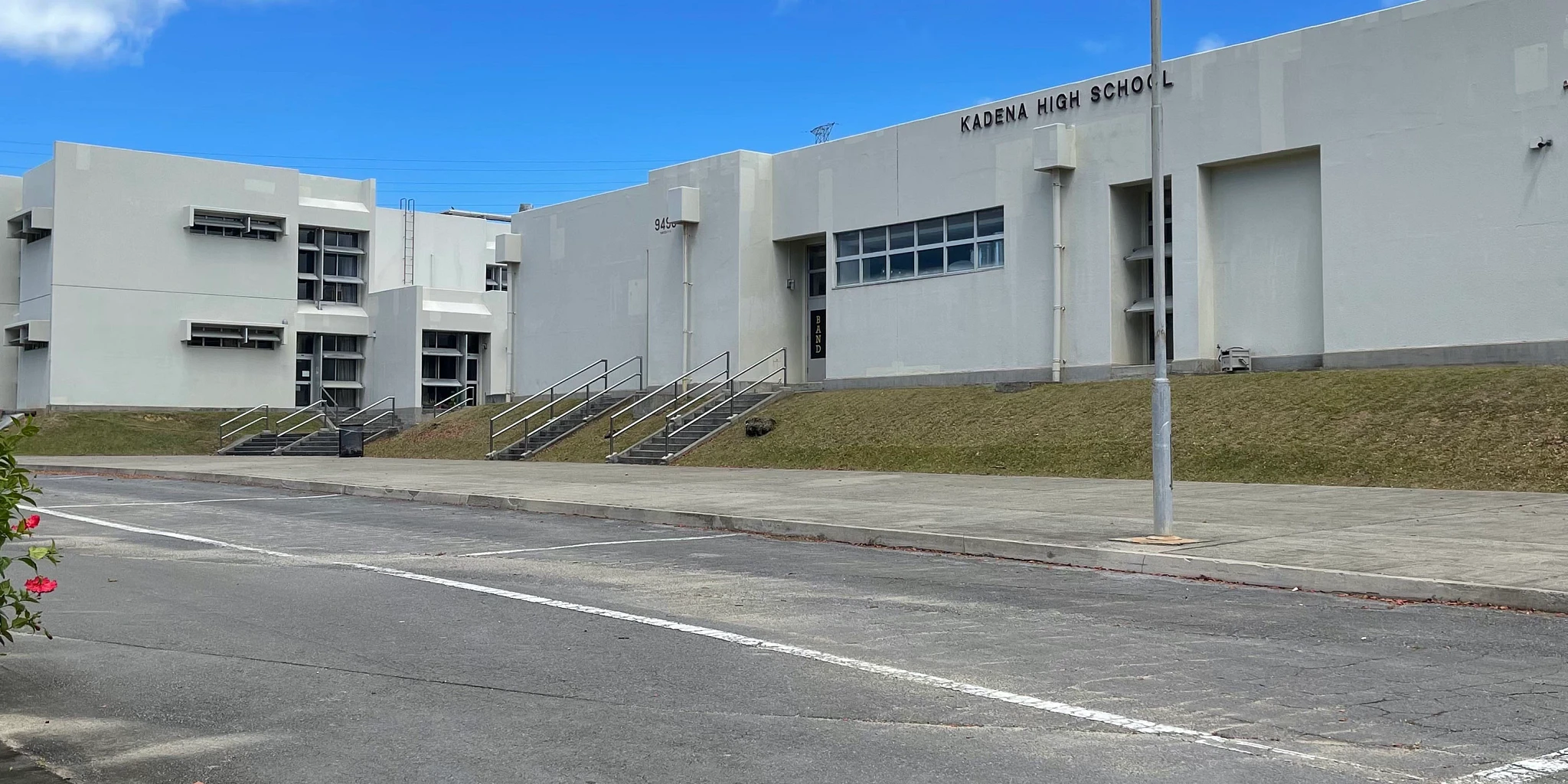
- Kadena Air Base, Okinawa; Japan

Information
- Type: Public – DoDEA
- Motto: We take care of ourselves. We take care of each other. We take care of our school!
- Established: 1981 (45 years ago)
- CEEB code: 561650
- Principal: Dr.James P. Bleecker & Joi Gause
- Enrollment: 814
- Student to teacher ratio: 18:1
- Colors: Gold and black and white
- Mascot: Panther
- Website: kadenahs.dodea.edu

Kadena High School (カデナ高校, Kadena Kōkō) is an American high school located at Kadena Air Base in Okinawa City, Okinawa Prefecture, Japan, administered by the Department of Defense Education Activity. Opened in 1981, the school is for American military connected students in grades 9–12. It is run under the supervision of the Okinawa Department of Defense Dependents Schools District.

== Campus ==
The school is located near the east entrance of Gate 5 with Kadena Middle School on the west side of the Gate. The school has a single main building where most classes and activities are held. Due to a large number of students, an additional 2-story building, referred to as "The Annex", was added. The school pool was filled in due to a bad foundation, and the pool house was subsequently given to the school's AFJROTC unit.

== History ==
When opened in 1981, it included grade levels 7–12, as there were no middle schools at the time. Kadena Middle School (Gate 2 location) closed after the previous year. A new middle school for grades 7 and 8 was built across the street in 1990 with access via a bridge and later included grade 6.

There was a total of 41 students associated with the KHS class of 1982, with 35 graduating. There are 40 listed are in the yearbook; however, four graduated on January 20, 1982, and 31 graduated on June 2 (one is not listed in the yearbook). The yearbook has 29 student pictures and lists an additional 11 with no picture.

According to Pacific Stars and Stripes, in December 1996, Vice Principal James Feller resigned and fled Okinawa after learning he was being investigated for taking sexually suggestive photographs, including partially nude photos, of female students after learning he had been suspended and slated for removal. The conclusion of the investigation led Japanese officials to believe that they did not have the jurisdiction to prosecute Feller, as all involved were Americans, and Feller had fled back to America. American military police did not continue their investigation into Feller.

== Sports ==
The school mascot is the Panther, and the colors are black and gold. The school's main rivals are Kubasaki High School and Okinawa Christian School International. The school has teams in baseball, softball, tennis, golf, volleyball, cheer, basketball, soccer, football, wrestling, cross country, and track.

== Recognition ==
In the 2009–2010 season, Kadena beat Seoul American for the Far East Title 44–0.

Kadena High School's JA-932 Air Force JROTC unit competed in the first DODEA Far East JROTC marksmanship competition involving Air Force cadets, in December 2011, where one Kadena cadet won a novice 3rd place overall medal.

Kadena High School hosted the 2012 DODEA Far East JROTC drill competition in March 2012. They also hosted it in March 2014, getting 1st place in Overall, Armed Exhibition, Armed Regulations, and Unarmed Regulations, and also getting 2nd place in Unarmed Exhibition and Color Guard. This was their first time winning the competition.

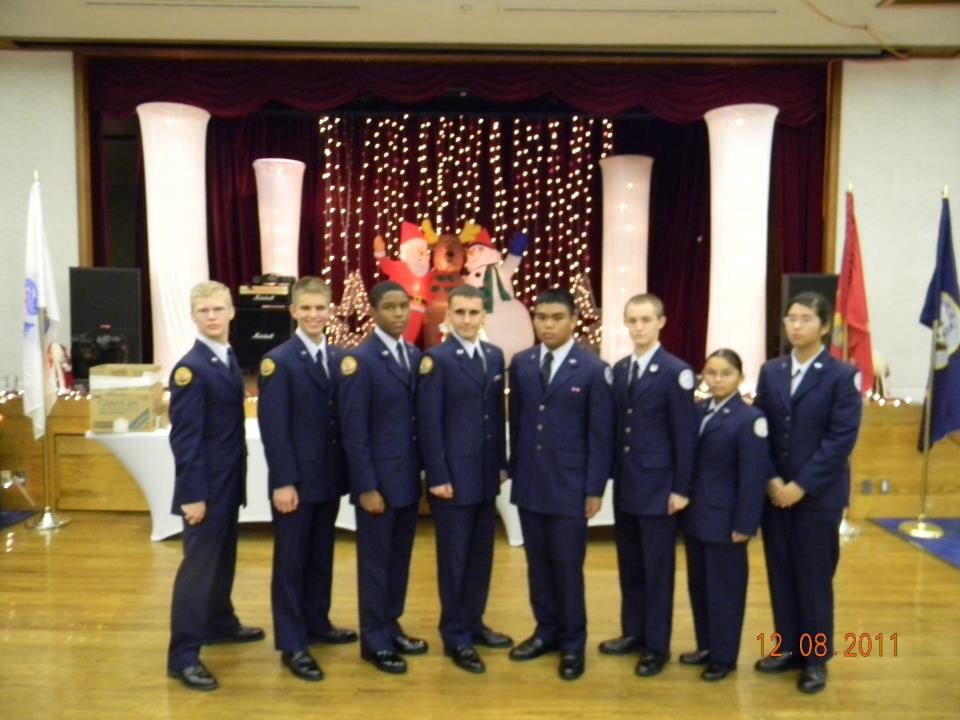
JA-932 at Marksmanship Far East Sasebo, Japan.

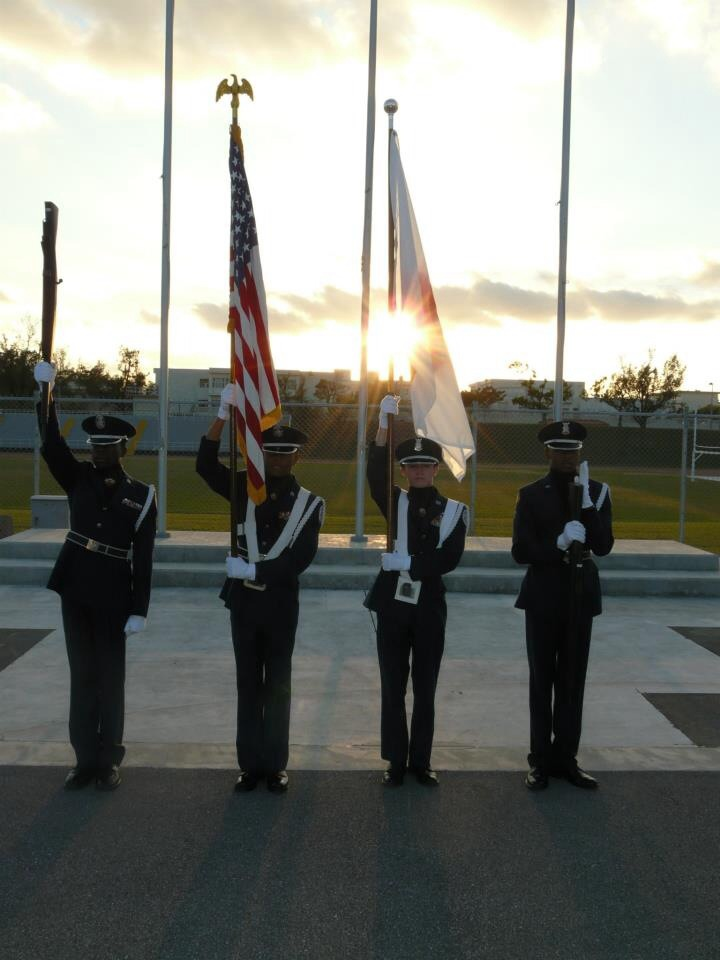
JA-932 Color Guard.

Kadena High School's Honors 10 Literature and 12 English teacher, Sarah McKinney was awarded the Okinawa District "Teacher of the Year" award by the Department of Defense Education Activity DODEA.

== See also ==
- List of Japanese international schools in the United States
- Americans in Japan
