= Keith Nakasone =

American judoka (born 1956)

Medal record

Men's Judo

Representing USA

US National Championships
Gold medal – first place	Gold	1979

US National Championships
Gold medal – first place	Gold	1978

US National Championships
Gold medal – first place	Gold	1977

US National Championships
Gold medal – first place	Gold	1975

Keith Nakasone (born January 20, 1956) is a former competitive judoka and native of Okinawa, Japan.

== Judo career ==
=== University ===
Nakasone is a four time (1974–1977) national collegiate judo champion at San Jose State University competing in the 132 lbs division. In 1978, Keith suffered a serious ankle injury.

=== Olympic team ===
Nakasone qualified for the 1980 U.S. Olympic team but did not compete due to the U.S. Olympic Committee's boycott of the 1980 Summer Olympics in Moscow, Soviet Union. He is one of 461 U.S. Olympians to receive a Congressional Gold Medal as a member of the 1980 Olympic team.
