= Kubasaki High School =

- クバサキ高校

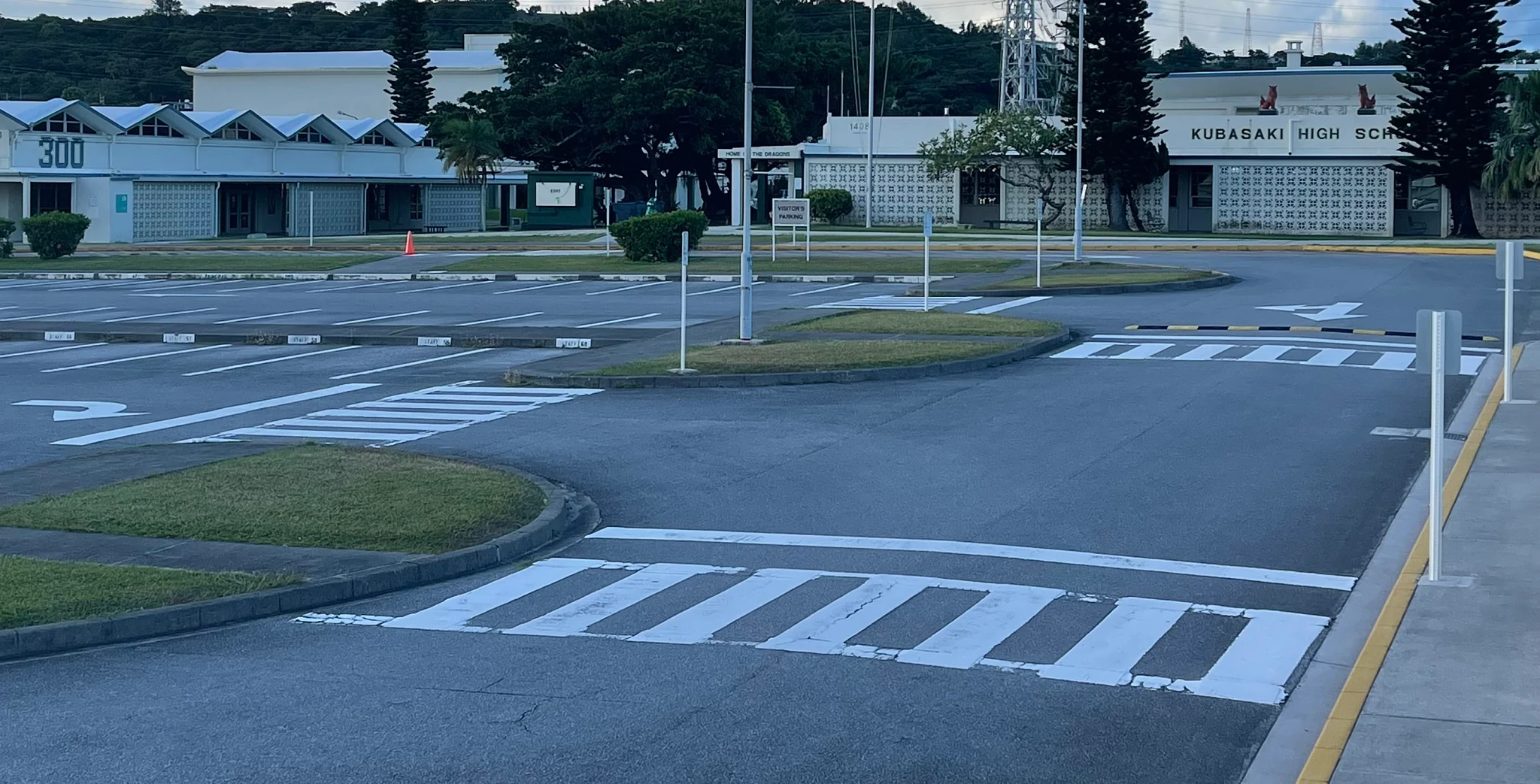

Location
- MCB Camp Foster and Kitanakagusuku; Okinawa; Japan; 26°18′20″N 127°46′51″E

Information
- School type: DoDEA private school
- Motto: Latin: Crede quod habes et habes (Believe that you have and you have.)
- Established: 1946 (80 years ago)
- Status: Open
- Authority: Department of Defense Dependents Schools
- Grades: 9-12
- Colors: Green and white
- Athletics: Football, XC, Tennis, Volleyball, Wrestling, Basketball, Track, Cross Country, Soccer
- Athletics conference: Far East Conference
- Mascot: Dragon
- Website: kubasakihs.dodea.edu

Kubasaki High School (クバサキ高校, Kubasaki Kōkō) is a United States Department of Defense Education Activity School on Okinawa, in Kitanakagusuku. Kubasaki is the second oldest operating high school in the Department of Defense Education Activity system. Only W.T. Sampson High School (1931) at Guantanamo Bay Naval Base in Cuba is older.

== History ==
The first classes started sometime in November 1946 at a site named Okinawa University Study Center in Camp Hayward with Dr. Theodora J. Koob as its founder and first principal. Classes were held on the site of Okinawa University Study Center in a large quonset hut under the name "Okinawa University School". The first classes consisted of 30 students and faculty; the initial schedule consisting of a half day, six days per week and was inclusive of only six grades. Middle and high school grade children were included sometime between November 1946 and March 1947. The school newspaper was The Quonsetter. There was no yearbook printed in 1947.

In the fall of 1947 classes opened the school year in a group of 15 Butler-type prefabricated buildings in the Awase housing area with 177 students and 11 teachers serving grades 1 through 12. 1947-1948 was the first year that high school seniors attended Okinawa University School. A problem with graduating seniors was the lack of accreditation of the school; however, on March 11, 1948, through the efforts of Dr. Theodora Koob, Okinawa University School received accreditation from The Northwest Association of Secondary and Higher Schools.

The first school yearbook was printed in 1948 and was called the Torii. The school newspaper was called the Typhoon. In July 1949, Typhoon Gloria destroyed the school and delayed the opening of the school year. When school did begin, teachers and students were forced to conduct their classes in two temporary family residences in the "New Sukiran Housing Area" (Zukeran, now known as Camp Foster). In November of that year, the school name was changed to "Okinawa-American Dependent High School" and moved back to the Awase Housing Area in quonset huts. Later, communist aggression on the Korean Peninsula necessitated a ban on dependent travel in East Asia, resulting in few new students enrolled until 1951. At some point before 1952, the school name was changed to Okinawa-American Dependent School. In 1952 during the publication of the fifth Torii, the Dragon was chosen as the mascot.

By 1952 rising enrollment forced a move to another set of quonsets at the Army Training School at Camp Kubasaki. The high school kids were moved to the new campus at Camp Kubasaki while the elementary and middle school kids remained at Awase. The name of the high school was changed in the fall of 1952 to Okinawa-American Dependents High School. Sometime between the fall of 1952 and the fall of 1955 the school name was changed again to Kubasaki American High School,

In the Fall of 1957, the school was moved into partitioned barracks in the Port Wheel area of Naha. By the early 1960s, the school was hosting grades 10 through 12.

To begin the school year in the fall of 1964, the school moved to its present and permanent location in the Kishaba Terrace housing area, adjacent to the U.S. Army post of Fort Buckner, and was renamed Kubasaki High School.

Kubasaki High School has withstood destruction from fire and typhoons on six campuses in five locations and with four names.

== Extracurricular activities ==
Student activities and groups include Associated Student Body, Chorus, Class Elected Officers, Seminar Representatives, Drama, Far East Activity Council events, Fellowship of Christian Athletes, Band, MCJROTC, Model United Nations, Chess Club, National Honor Society, and Yearbook.

The student newspaper of Kubasaki High School, the Typhoon, was established in 1964, when the present day Kubasaki High School was opened in Kishaba Terrace. During the late 1960s, the school newspaper gained national and international fame, winning 12 straight All American ratings from the National Scholastic Press Association (NSPA). In 1972, it was shortlisted for the Pacemaker Award as the top high school newspaper in America, edited that year by Joe Van Eaton. Quill and Scroll awarded the Typhoon the George H. Gallup Award for excellence in 1972 (edited by Mark Tunis). John Weldon was principal at this time. The Typhoon has been the only Department of Defense high school to win an All American rating and was under the advisership of Bill Hobbs. The student newspaper was printed locally by Okinawan printers. The Typhoon was the product of both extra-curricular students and the journalism class, taught and advised by Bill Hobbs.

The student yearbook of Kubasaki, the Torii, was founded sometime prior to 1956. In 1967, the Torii began production on a much larger scale, eventually becoming the largest single school Department of Defense high school yearbook with 336 pages in 1973, advised by Bill Hobbs. (This record was eclipsed in 1987 when Focus, student yearbook of Frankfurt (Germany) American High School published an All American book of 352 pages.) In 1971, edited by sophomore Frank Day, the Torii received an All American rating (the first of any DoD high school) by the NSPA. The Torii was printed stateside after the new Kubasaki was established in 1964. Principal Virginia Lee was instrumental in making the yearbook "more stateside" in its production and Walsworth Publishing CO., with a representative in the Far East advised. In 1973, when the school had almost 2000 students, grade 10 through 12, some 1200 copies were ordered from Taylor Publishing Co.

Quill and Scroll honorary journalistic society was established at Kubasaki High School in the spring of 1971, with Teresa Sheehan as its first president. In 1973, under its president Harvey Humphrey, this chapter was named the Bill Hobbs Chapter in honor of its founding adviser.

=== Athletics ===
The Kubasaki Dragons compete in interscholastic competition with other DoDEA schools and local Okinawan schools. Kubasaki fields teams in baseball, boys' and girls' basketball, coed cheerleading, girls' and boys' cross country, football, boys' and girls' golf, boys' and girls' soccer, softball, boys' and girls' tennis, boys' and girls' track and field, girls' volleyball, and wrestling. High school students can also join the local Okinawa Dolphins swim team and earn a letter.

==== Football ====
Kubasaki has a legacy of prep football from the start of the Cold War era.

As KHS was the only school on the island with active varsity and JV gridiron programs at the time, teams were determined by the general location on-island the players were from. From the 1950s through the 1980s, Kubasaki's legacy teams and colors were Kadena Falcons (blue & white), Sukiran (later Zukeran) Knights (black & white), and Naha Eagles (red & white).

The team names, mascots, and colors carried-over to Kubasaki's basketball and wrestling squads.

As there was no football field or stadium at Kubasaki's previous campuses (and, until recently, the present Kishaba campus), each team had their respective "home field" stadium. MacDonald Stadium on Kadena Air Base was home to the Falcons; the Sukiran Knights shared Rambler Field at Sukiran Stadium in the Camp Sukiran Troop Area (now known as Marine Corps Base Camp Foster) with the Army's intramural football team, the Rangers; and the Eagles claimed Naha Field at Naha Air Base as their home turf.

The Fall 1966 Kadena Falcons were coached by Captain James C Harding—later to be the 25th most decorated member of the U.S. military in American history.

By the mid-1970s, a fourth "expansion team" — Kubasaki Warriors (gold & white) — was added due to the large post-Vietnam student population and to give those prep athletes an opportunity to play.

For regional games against opponents on mainland Japan, an "all-star" team of top players from all three (and later, four) Kubasaki varsity squads were selected and sported the green and white uniforms of the Kubasaki Dragons.

The legacy teams were dissolved with the opening of Kubasaki's new "cross-town rivals," Kadena High School on Kadena Air Base in 1981.

Kubasaki has the Varsity Dragons and the JV Dragons. At the beginning of the season, these teams are not formed. Instead, they make up the Green Squad and White Squad, and they have scrimmages against themselves.

The Kubasaki All-Stars lost the first "Cherry Bowl" game 30–0 in Yamato Japan (1961) to the Narimasu Dragons; coincidentally, this game was held on the 20th anniversary of Pearl Harbor.

They split two games with Kanto Plains champion Yokota High School in the 1970s.

From 1982 to 2004, Kubasaki and Kadena High School fielded two teams each to make up the four-team Okinawa Secondary Schools Athletic Association (OSSAA) football league. In 23 seasons, the Kubasaki Samurai won or shared 15 island championships, while the Kubasaki Shogun captured six.

At the end of the season, a Dragons varsity team was selected from the Samurai and Shogun and played against Kadena's varsity team. In 1992, the Dragons swept Kadena two games to none and routed Yokota 44–12 in the inaugural Ichiban Bowl. In 2005, the Dragons won the First Class AA Far East Championship against the Seoul American Falcons 34–14.

== Notable alumni ==
- Keith Nakasone, 1980 U.S.A. Olympic judo, team captain. Class of 1974.
- Kristin Armstrong, cyclist. Three-time Olympic gold medalist in the individual time trial in 2008, 2012 and 2016. Class of 1991.
- Patricia Fink, singer

== See also ==
- List of Japanese international schools in the United States
- Americans in Japan
