= Olaf Fink =

American politician and educator

Olaf James Fink

Louisiana State Senator for Algiers (15th Ward of New Orleans)
- In office 1956–1972
- Succeeded by: Fritz Windhorst

Personal details
- Born: March 15, 1914 New Orleans, Louisiana, USA
- Died: March 26, 1973 (aged 59) New Orleans, Louisiana
- Resting place: Westlawn Memorial Park and Mausoleum in Gretna, Louisiana
- Party: Democratic
- Spouse: Doris Jean Smith Fink
- Children: No children
- Parent(s): Charles Peter and Mary Caroline Lind Fink
- Education: S. J. Peters Boys High School of Commerce Spring Hill College Loyola University New Orleans
- Occupation: Educator and politician

Military service
- Branch/service: United States Navy Reserve

Olaf James Fink (March 15, 1914 – March 26, 1973) was a Louisiana educator and politician who served as a Democrat in the Louisiana State Senate from 1956 to 1972.

Born in Algiers, New Orleans, Fink received a B.A. from Spring Hill College in Mobile, Alabama, followed by an M.A. from Loyola University in New Orleans. After a lengthy high school teaching career, he served in the state senate for sixteen years. The Olaf Fink Center for Pre-Vocational Education in New Orleans was named for him in 1974, the year after his death, and existed until it was sold by the local government in 2011.

| Preceded by Missing | Louisiana State Senator for Algiers (the 15th Ward of New Orleans); Olaf James Fink; 1956–1972 | Succeeded by Delegation reduced from eight to seven members |
