= Shūkan Bunshun =

Japanese weekly news magazine

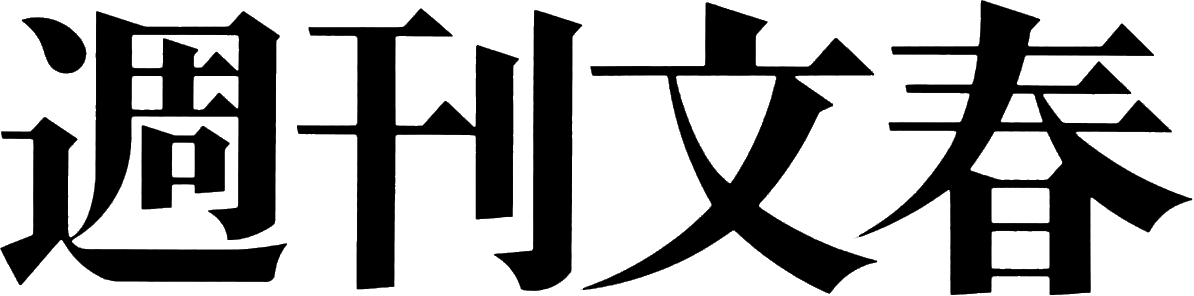

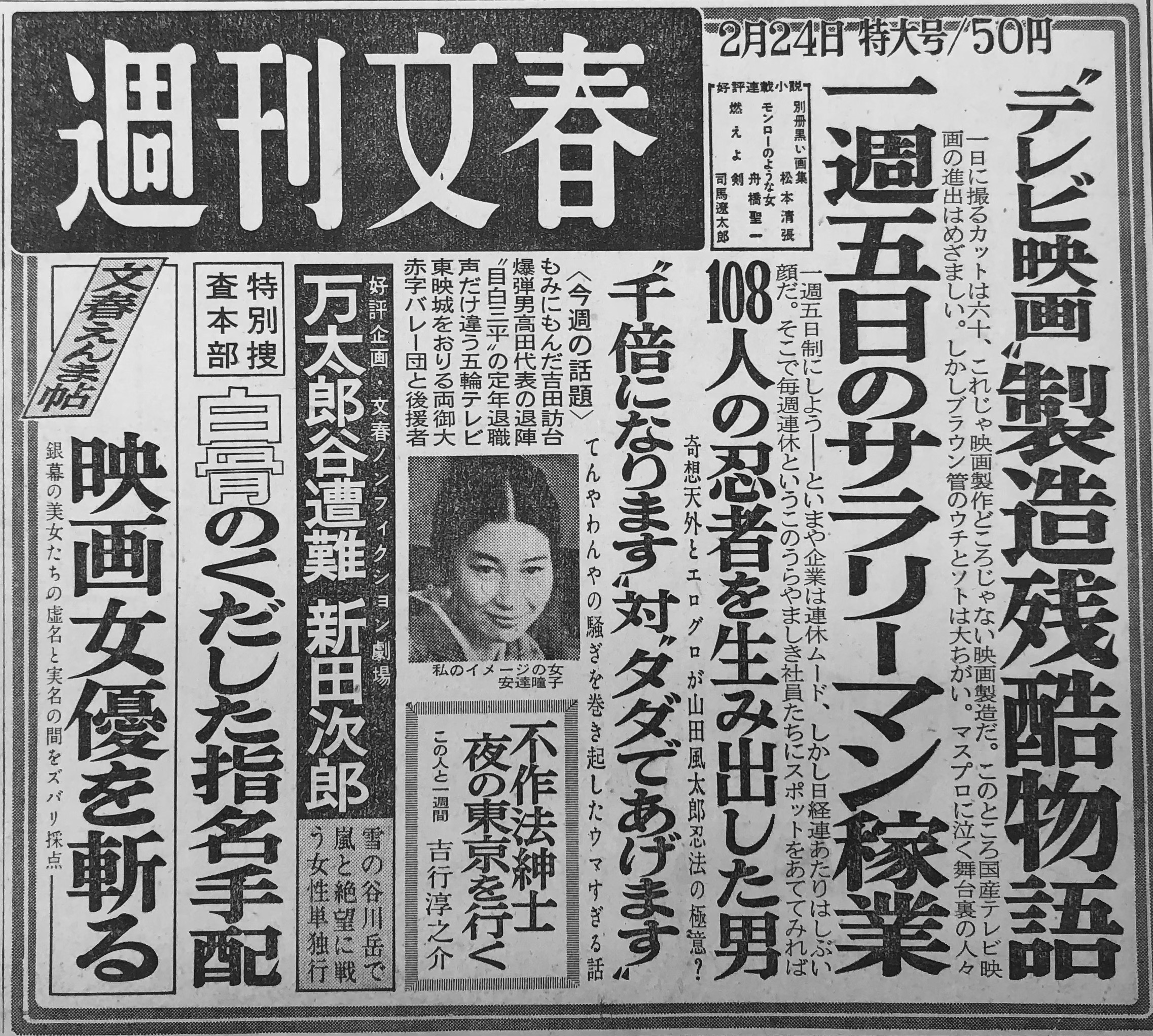
- February 1964 issue
- Categories: News magazine
- Frequency: Weekly
- Circulation: 170,000
- Founded: 1959
- First issue: April 1959
- Company: Bungeishunjū
- Country: Japan
- Based in: Tokyo
- Language: Japanese
- Website: bunshun.jp

Shūkan Bunshun (週刊文春, Shūkan Bunshun; lit. "Weekly Bunshun") is a Japanese weekly tabloid (shūkanshi) based in Tokyo, Japan, known for its investigative journalism and frequent clashes with the Japanese government. This has led to it being considered one of the most influential weekly magazines in the country.

== History and profile ==
Shūkan Bunshun was first published in April 1959. The magazine is part of Bungeishunjū, a publishing group headquartered in Chiyoda, Tokyo. From October 2014 to September 2015 Shūkan Bunshun was the fourth best selling weekly magazine in Japan with a circulation of 680,296 copies. As of 2023, the total number of copies sold has dropped to 165,794. As a general-news magazine, Shūkan Bunshun's major competitor is the more conservative Shukan Shincho.

The magazine has been praised, but also criticized for its investigative reporting which takes on both political scandals, as well as those from the world of entertainment, and these kinds of reports are colloquially known as the "Bunshun cannon" (文春砲, Bunshunhō). In the first three months of 2016, "It brought down a minister and a politician, practically destroyed the careers of a popular celebrity and a news commentator and nearly broke up one of Japan's biggest boy bands," reported the BBC which stated that the magazine was "shaking up the cosy media club" in Japan. However, the magazine was also widely criticized for its exposé of Tetsuya Komuro's adultery, with The Japan Times stating that the story was not favorably received and that "Japanese netizens appear to have turned against Shukan Bunshun and other scandal-baiting publications.

Bunshun is also known for sensationalist headlines and texts that put the subjects they deal with in a bad light because, in a system in which advertising profits are increased by the number of contacts, what matters is attracting the attention of readers. Acting alongside the concept that "interest (attention) is economically superior to quality of information" has led to cases like the one noted by the lecturer at Kanda University of International Studies Jeffrey J. Hall, when Komuro Kei, consort of ex-Princess Mako, started using the electronic communications app Telegram, and Bunshun associated Komuro with crime because in Japan Telegram was seen to be a tool for criminals.

== Notable reports and controversies ==
=== Kazuyoshi Miura ===
In January 1984, Shūkan Bunshun reported the suspicion that Kazuyoshi Miura, a trading company owner, had someone shoot and kill his wife Kazumi in Los Angeles in November 1981 to obtain a huge insurance payout. They also reported the suspicion that Miura murdered his lover, Chizuko Shiraishi, in Los Angeles in 1979 and withdrew a large sum of money from her account. These cases were dubbed "L.A. Scandal". Until then, Miura had been treated as a tragic man whose wife was ruthlessly shot in Los Angeles, but overnight he was thrust into a completely opposite position. Following the Shūkan Bunshun articles, tabloid TV shows and numerous weekly magazines reported the scandal extensively day after day, night after night. In addition, they also reported extensively on Miura's privacy and his history of juvenile delinquency. The frenzy continued for a while, with numerous reporters and photographers surrounding Miura's house throughout the day, and as a result, he and his family fled to London for a time. In response, some of the press chased them all the way to London. Subsequently, an actress, a former lover of Miura, confessed that she had attacked his wife at his request in Los Angeles in August 1981. Miura was arrested in September 1985, and after a lengthy trial, the Tokyo District Court sentenced him to life imprisonment. However, the Tokyo High Court acquitted him for insufficient evidence, and in 2003, the Supreme Court rejected an appeal by the prosecution, thus confirming his innocence. (In the case of the actress who attacked his wife, he was convicted.) Note that after his arrest, he filed lawsuits against more than 400 articles in the press that he considered defamatory. According to Miura's own claim, he won more than 80% of these cases. In February 2008, Miura went to Saipan, where he was arrested by local authorities because his cases were still under investigation in the U.S. territory. In October 2008, he was extradited to Los Angeles and committed suicide in jail.

=== Onyanko Club ===
In April 1985, Shūkan Bunshun published the photo of six members of the idol group Onyanko Club smoking in a coffee shop. This led to the dismissal of five out of the six members from the group. Since they were considered core members of the group, the scandal changed the form and fate of Onyanko Club.

=== Junko Furuta ===
In 1989, Shūkan Bunshun uncovered and published the identities of the four male teenagers (Hiroshi Miyano, Jō Ogura, Shinji Minato, and Yasushi Watanabe) who abducted, raped, tortured and then subsequently murdered Junko Furuta on the grounds that, given the severity of the crime, the accused did not deserve to have their right to anonymity upheld.

=== Johnny & Associates ===
In 2001, Shūkan Bunshun ran a series on sexual harassment allegations against Johnny & Associates founder Johnny Kitagawa, along with claims that Kitagawa had allegedly forced boys to drink alcohol and smoke. The exposé was particularly notable in that Shūkan Bunshun was the only media outlet willing to publish such allegations, especially since Kitagawa was known to have control over entertainment media. Johnny & Associates sued Shukan Bunshun for defamation, and in 2002, the Tokyo District Court ruled in favor of Kitagawa, awarding him ¥8.8 million in damages. In 2003, the fine was lowered to ¥1.2 million on the basis that the drinking and smoking allegations were defamatory, while the sexual harassment claims were not. Kitagawa filed an appeal to the Supreme Court of Japan, but it was rejected in 2004.

=== Mitsuo Kagawa ===
In 2001 Bunshun accused Mitsuo Kagawa, a professor at Beppu University of fraud after the alleged Japanese Paleolithic findings made by amateur archaeologist Shinichi Fujimura. After Mainichi Shimbun revealed the truth behind Fujimura's archaeological fraud, Bunshun alleged that the stone tools discovered in Ōita Prefecture had also been forgeries done by professor Mitsuo Kagawa. Kagawa committed suicide and left a suicide note in which he pleaded his innocence. The family filed a lawsuit for damages to recover the deceased's honor. On February 23, 2004, the Bungeishunju group was ordered by The Fukuoka High Court to pay 9.2 million yen and place an apology advertisement on the first page of Bungeishunju.

=== Kisho Kurokawa ===
In 2004 Bushun was sentenced to pay 6 million yen to the architect Kisho Kurokawa and to publish an apology announcement for criticizing a bridge he built for Toyota City with the statement "Citizens scold Kisho Kurokawa's 10 billion yen dinosaur bridge!"

=== AKB48 ===
In an article dated February 18, 2010 it was reported that an inappropriate relationship existed between some members of AKB48 and the president of the management company. In 2013, Bunshun was sentenced to pay compensation of 1.65 million yen and publish an apology for damaging the group's image, a sentence upheld after Bungeishunju's appeal.

=== Tsuneo Kita ===
In the July 19, 2012 issue, it was reported that a female desk worker in the company's economic department was working from an apartment in Tokyo where the then president of Nihon Keizai Shimbun, Tsuneo Kita, lived. The Nihon Keizai Shimbun sued the publisher claiming that "its reputation has been damaged by unfounded headlines and articles." Bungeishunju was condemned to publish apology advertisements in Nikkei and Bunshun, pay compensation of 12.1 million yen, and delete articles and photos posted on the website. On June 25, 2015, issue of Weekly Bunshun, was published a statement that said that "the entire article was false and false information.".

=== Minami Minegishi ===
On 31 January 2013, Shukan Bunshun reported that then-AKB48 member Minami Minegishi had spent a night at the apartment home of Alan Shirahama, a member of the boy band Generations from Exile Tribe, despite that AKB48 members are not contractually allowed to have romantic relationships. A few hours later, after she was demoted to kenkyūsei (trainee) status on 1 February, AKB48's YouTube channel released a video of Minegishi's apology. In the video, she repeatedly apologized for her "thoughtless behavior" and hoped that the management would let her remain with the group, with her head shaved to show contrition. The punishment and subsequent head-shaving drew negative reactions from international media, including Agence France-Presse, CNN, Daily News, The Guardian, ABC, Spiegel Online, and Al Jazeera English, who criticized AKB48's management and Japan's idol industry over banning idols from having romantic relationships.

=== Hideo Higashikokubaru ===
On June 30, 2014, Bushun was ordered to pay compensation of 2.2 million yen to Hideo Higashikokubaru for a defamatory article published in 2012, in which the then governor of Miyazaki Prefecture was accused of unbecoming behavior towards female employees.

=== Becky ===
In January 2016, popular female TV tarento, Becky's reputation dived after Shukan Bunshun revealed that she had an affair with musician Enon Kawatani who at the time was married. Following the scandal, Kawatani announced that he had officially divorced his wife. To appease the public backlash and as a condition for her comeback to show business in Japan, Becky tried to officially apologize to Kawatani's wife. However, having no direct channel to her, Becky contacted the Shukan Bunshun's editorial department instead. Shukan Bunshun published the full contents of Becky's letter at the end of April 2016. As a result of her apologies, Becky was able to make a comeback with an appearance on TBS. In her first appearance back on TV, she appeared on Full Chorus – Music is Full Chorus on the cable channel BS Skyperfect TV. As a result of the expose, Becky lost many of her sponsors and other sources of income.

=== Sean K ===
In March 2016, Sean McArdle Kawakami's career as a Japanese news and business commentator came to an abrupt end after Shukan Bunshun revealed a fabricated academic background that included claims of an MBA from the world-famous Harvard Business School, as well as further false claims to have graduated from Temple University and conducted a Study abroad at Pantheon Sorbonne, University of Paris 1.

=== Kawai vote-buying in Hiroshima ===
In 2019, shortly after a report published in Shukan Bunshun, alleging that House of Councillors's representative Anri Kawai's election office had paid campaign announcers a daily amount that exceeded the permitted legal limit, her husband Katsuyuki Kawai announced his resignation as Minister for Justice on 30 October 2019. In the aftermath of the initial article, further revelations followed, that the headquarters of the governing Liberal Democratic Party had transferred an unusually large amount of 150 million yen to the local Hiroshima office, prior to the election.

A list of at least 100 recipients of money, including prefectural and municipal politicians from the Hiroshima prefecture, as well as members of the couple's campaign groups, was found on a computer belonging to Katsuyuki Kawai after a raid on the couple's house and offices. On 16 June 2020, Anri Kawai and her husband, Katsuyuki Kawai, left the Liberal Democratic Party amidst the ongoing allegations of buying votes to aid her campaign for the House of Councilors. They were later arrested by public prosecutors on 19 June 2020 on charges of vote-buying and distributing around 25 million yen to politicians and supporters in Hiroshima in violation of the Public Office Elections Law.

Subsequently, in July 2020, the Hiroshima district and high court ruled that a state-paid secretary to Anri Kawai paid 2.04 million yen in total to 14 members of Kawai's campaign staff between 19 and 23 July 2019 during the election to the House of Councillors, an amount which implied payments higher than the legal limit of 15,000 yen per person per day. As a result, the secretary received a punishment of 18 months in prison, suspended for 5 years. In the wake of the conviction, the Hiroshima High Public Prosecutors Office filed a lawsuit to cancel Anri Kawai's 2019 election victory, on the basis of guilt by association as defined under the Japanese Public Offices Election Law. On 20 January 2021, the Tokyo District Court sentenced Anri Kawai to a year and four months in prison, suspended for five years. The court ruled that her distribution of money to local legislators in Hiroshima was in violation of the Public Offices Election Law. In the indictment, one member of the Etajima Municipal Assembly and four members of the Prefectural Assembly admitted receiving cash payments of ¥1.7 million in total. The local politicians stated that they believed Anri Kawai and her husband passed them the money to secure support for Anri Kawai in the Upper House election of 2019.

=== Sanae Takaichi slander accusation ===
On April 30, 2026, the issue of the Shukan Bunshun reported that the campaign team of Prime Minister Sanae Takaichi allegedly created and uploaded videos on social media slandering other candidates during the 2025 Liberal Democratic Party presidential election, which included Shinjirō Koizumi, as well as Katsuya Okada of Centrist Reform Alliance during the 2026 Japanese general election. Takaichi denies this claim on a plenary session of the House of Councillors on May 8 after she was questioned by Tomoko Kojima. She again denied that accusation in the House of Councillors Budget Committee session on May 11, stating that "I spoke to my secretary on the phone. I was told that we did not create or post any negative videos about other candidates... If you ask me whether I believe the weekly magazine or my secretary, I believe my secretary." On May 13, she stated that she had "no involvement whatsoever in the contents of the weekly magazine" adding that "the Takaichi office and the Takaichi campaign" have not made any posts from accounts other than those operated by the office during the presidential election or the House of Representatives election.

On May 18, Ken Matsui uploaded a video on YouTube claiming that he worked with a secretary at Takaichi's office to creating and uploading the alleged videos starting about a week before the presidential election providing messages exchanged between Takaichi's secretary and the man. According to Shukan Bunshun, Matsui also created a cryptocurrency named after Takaichi called "Sanae". The next day, Takaichi denied a meeting between Matsui, her and her secretary but when asked if they had interaction online, she said that she does have an answer. When asked if she intended to sue Shukan Bunshun for defamation on May 22, she replied that she is currently focusing on her duties as Prime Minister.
