= Japanese Paleolithic hoax =

2000s archaeological hoax by Shinichi Fujimura

The Japanese Paleolithic hoax (旧石器捏造事件, Kyū Sekki Netsuzō Jiken) consisted of a number of Lower and Middle Paleolithic finds in Japan discovered by amateur archaeologist Shinichi Fujimura, which were later all discovered to have been faked. The incident became one of the biggest scandals in archaeological circles in Japan after the story was published by the Mainichi Shimbun on November 5, 2000.

For finds from the Jōmon period or later, structures were originally made by digging below the then-current surface, causing changes in soil composition that make it much easier to discern fakes from real finds. The Paleolithic hoax highlighted some of the shortcomings of Japanese archaeological research into paleolithic sites, such as an over-reliance on the dating of volcanic ash layers while ignoring other soil layers.

== Fujimura's success ==
Fujimura had begun faking discoveries when he was working as an amateur archaeologist in the 1970s in proximity to various Paleolithic research groups in Miyagi Prefecture. He found numerous artifacts and relics in quick succession, all from the Japanese Paleolithic era. Some researchers were initially sceptical of Fujimura's finds, as there was little expectation that stone tools of such an age would be found in Japan. However, Fujimura's success in finding artifacts soon silenced his critics, and his reputation as a leading amateur archaeologist was firmly established by the early 1980s. He was seen as a valuable member of an archaeological team, with some going so far as to describe him as a "divine hand".

Fujimura's remarkable successes generated an enormous amount of indirect involvement from supporting organizations. Some of his archaeological dig sites, notably Zazaragi, were designated as national historical sites by the Japanese government, and the Agency for Cultural Affairs sponsored special exhibitions. Local governments in the Tōhoku region, where many of the sites were located, used Fujimura's "findings" as the basis for creating specialty products and tourist attractions to augment the local economy.

A small number of professional archaeologists cast doubt on Fujimura's finds. However, these objections were not widespread, allowing Fujimura to continue his fraud. A critical paper was published in 1986, noting among other points that "the TL dates from Zazaragi are additional indicators that something is wrong with the geological context of the artifacts, at least at that site. The dates for Strata 4, 6c, and 8 are totally out of line". In 1990, Michio Okamura published a book on the Paleolithic which debunked the supposed Early Paleolithic culture. Three more papers were published in 1998 and 2000. The thrust of the argument in 2000 was that the problematic Paleolithic findings were "odd" compared to others from the Lower and Middle Paleolithic.

== Discovery of the hoax ==
The truth behind Fujimura's archaeological fraud was exposed by the newspaper Mainichi Shinbun, in a morning edition article on November 5, 2000. At the time, Fujimura was working as deputy director of the Tōhoku Paleolithic Institute, a private research center. Hearing the rumour of fraud, journalists from Mainichi newspaper installed hidden cameras at a dig site where Fujimura was working and caught him planting artifacts. The newspaper later confronted Fujimura with the video, and he was forced to confess his fraud.

The Mainichi Shinbun exposé concerned just the Kamitakamori site near Tsukidate, Miyagi Prefecture, and the Sōshin Fudōzaka site in Hokkaidō, but news of the hoax led to reappraisals at all the sites where Fujimura had worked. It was discovered that most of Fujimura's artifacts had been collected from other Jōmon-era sites in the Tōhoku region and planted at the sites where he was working. Evidence was found of scrapes and damage from prior unearthing on many of the paleolithic artifacts Fujimura had been connected with. Investigations showed that the hoax went as far as the same items being "discovered" more than once, and fake paleolithic items being buried for later "discovery".

It was later revealed that Fujimura's hoax extended beyond the paleolithic era to include Jōmon period artifacts as well.

== Reaction ==
It was widely reported in the foreign media that the revelation of Fujimura's duplicity shook Japanese lower and middle paleolithic research to its core, as much of it had been built on the foundation Fujimura had laid.

It is clear that a number of the artifacts found by Fujimura are rather unnatural and do not make archaeological sense, such as those exhumed from pyroclastic flow strata, but nonetheless majority archaeological groups as well as local and government organisations which substantially benefited from his find ignored these inconsistencies. There were also "finds" that were quite difficult to believe, such as stone implements in which the cross sections happened to match those of items found at sites tens of kilometers away. There was sharp criticism that such flawed items should not have been blindly accepted for so long.

Immediately after the hoax was discovered, the Japanese Archaeological Association formed a special committee which spent two and a half years reviewing the incident, releasing a report in May 2003 concluding that Fujimura's work was indeed the product of a hoax and admitting that, aside from a few exceptions, majority fail at pointing inconsistencies of Fujimura's finds.

== Aftermath ==
In a series of articles in the Japanese magazine Shūkan Bunshun published on January 25, February 1 and March 15, 2001, the magazine alleged that the stone tools discovered at the Hijiridaki cave site (聖嶽洞窟遺跡) in Ōita Prefecture had also been forgeries, and indicated that Mitsuo Kagawa, a professor at Beppu University, was a "second divine hand" involved in that hoax. Kagawa committed suicide and left a suicide note in which he pleaded his innocence.

His family filed a defamation suit against Shūkan Bunshun the same year. The Ōita district Court and the Fukuoka High Court decided to order the magazine to pay the damages and issue an apology to the family of Kagawa. The magazine appealed to the Supreme Court of Japan, although the appeal was rejected in September 2004. An apology statement was published in the September 2, 2004, issue.

== See also ==
- Archaeological forgery
