= Ōyama Shell Mound =

Archaeological site in Okinawa, Japan

- 大山貝塚 (Japanese)
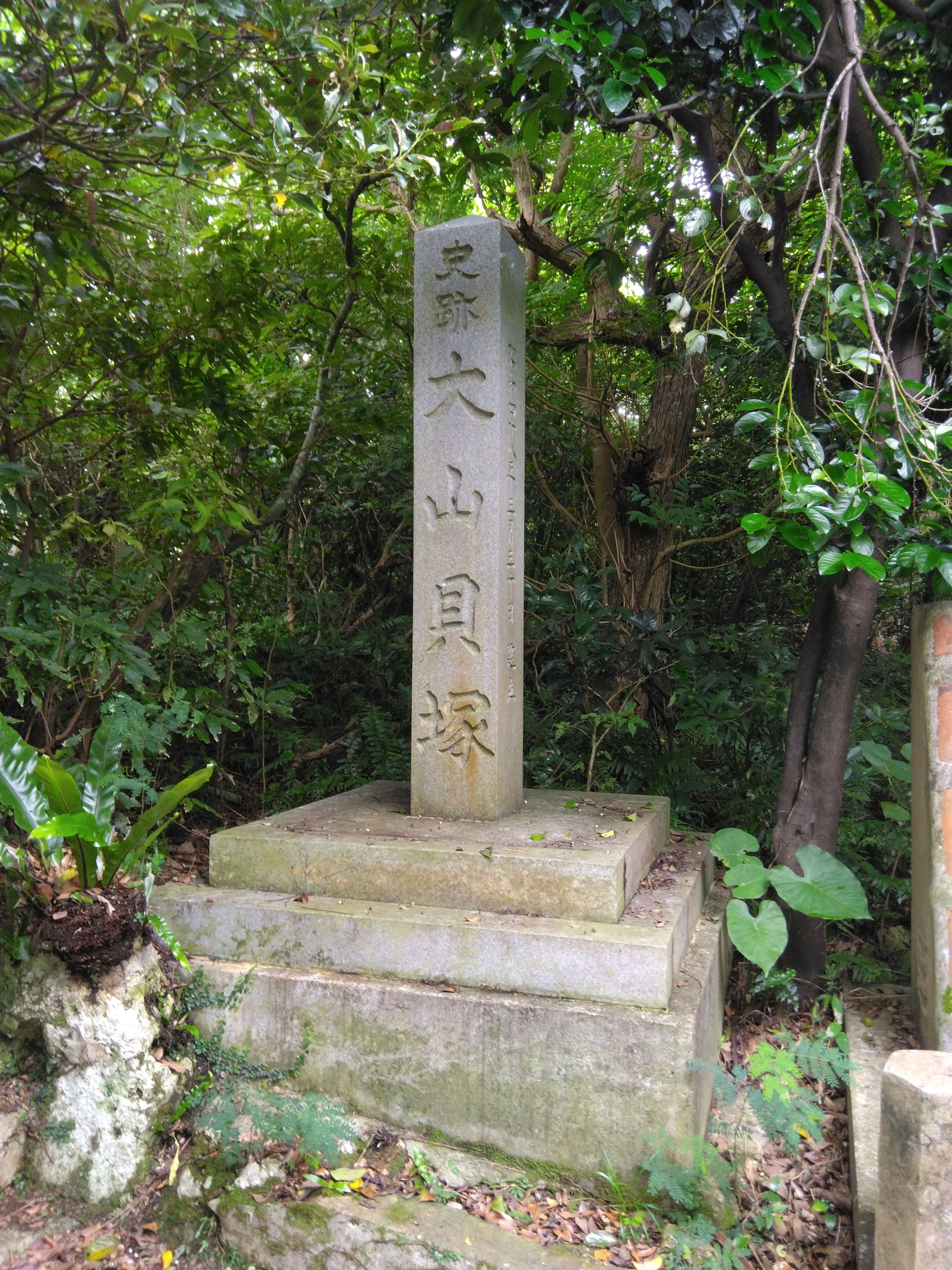
- Sign at the entrance of Ōyama Shell Mound
- Interactive map of Ōyama Shell Mound
- 26°16′25″N 127°44′42″E
- Type: Settlement
- Periods: Kaizuka period; Early modern period
- Cultures: Early Kaizuka Phases IV and V; Ryūkyū Kingdom
- Location: Ginowan, Okinawa, Okinawa Prefecture, Japan
- Region: Okinawa Island

Site notes
- Elevation: 70 m (230 ft)
- Length: 94 m (308 ft)
- Width: 47 m (154 ft)
- Area: 0.364 ha (0.90 acres)
- Excavation dates: 1954, 1958
- Archaeologists: Sango Katō; Shinjun Tawada; Mitsuo Kagawa
- Discovered: 1899
- Condition: no visible remains
- Owner: public
- Public access: Yes

Designations
- Designation: National Historic Site

Ōyama Shell Mound (大山貝塚; ōyama kaizuka) is an archaeological site of the Early Kaizuka period Phases IV and V (3500 to 2500 years BP) located in Ōyama aza in Ginowan, in Okinawa Prefecture, in Japan.

It is a major site for the establishment of Kaizuka period ceramic typological chronologies and for the evolution of excavation techniques on Okinawa Island. It is also the eponymous site for the Ōyama type pottery, that is a characteristic pottery type of the second half of the Early Kaizuka Phase IV.

It was designated a National Historic Site in 1972.

== Location and Topography ==
Ōyama Shell Mound is located in Ginowan, a city on the western coast of Okinawa Island. It is on a hill that is one of the sacred sites of the Ōyama settlement, named Misukuyama (美底山; ミスクヤマ) or Misukumūi (美底森; ミスクムゥイ)., Historical documents mention it under the name of Yahoso-mui Utaki (ヤホソ森御嶽).

The site is located on the western slope of this middle-sized hill, at the border of the third step of the limestone plateaus that grow up from the coastline on the western side of Ginowan City, just outside of the U.S. military base of Futenma.

The site is at an altitude of about 70 metres.

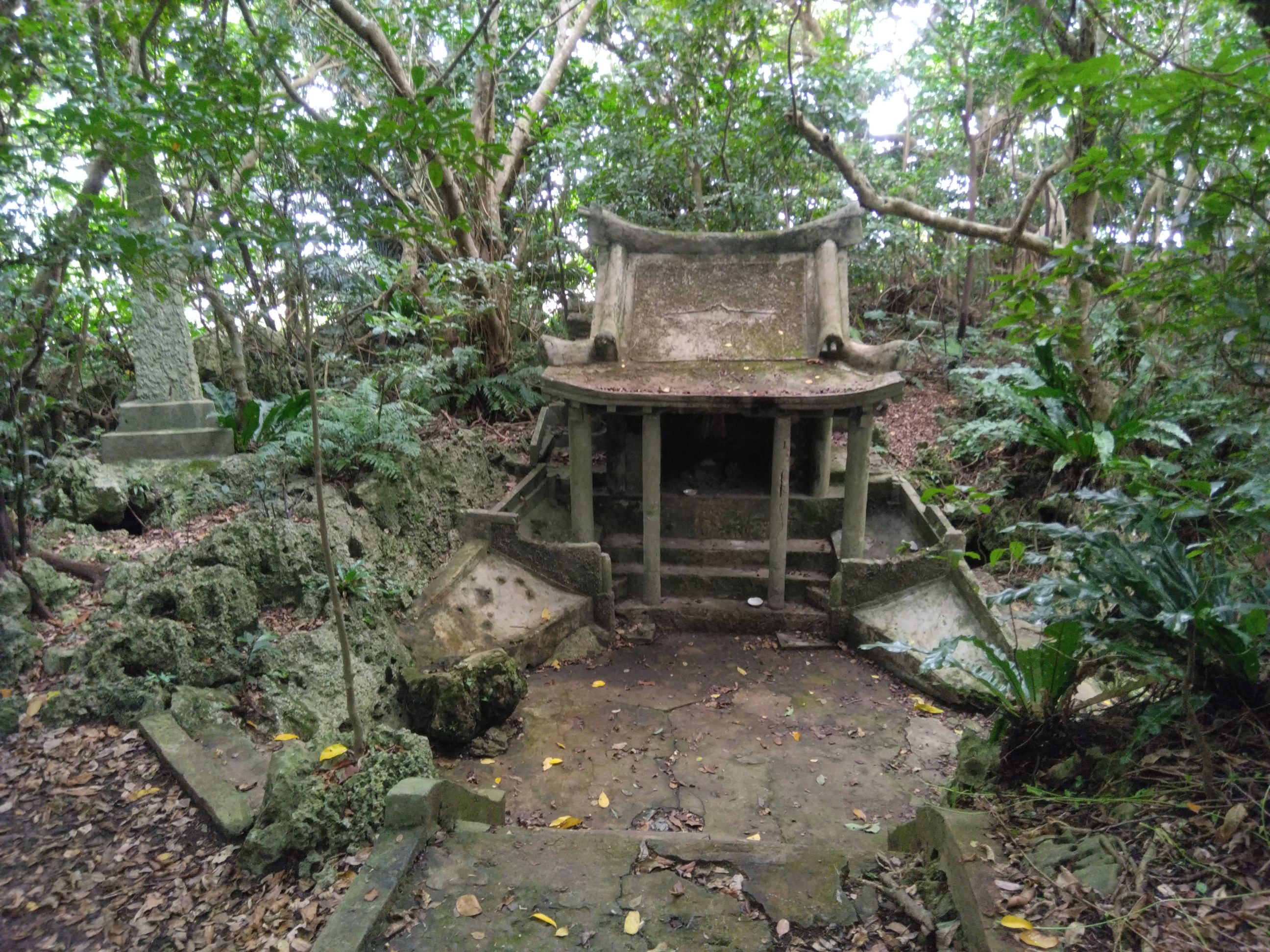
Misukumūi Utaki, the northern terrace is on the right, the southern one on the left

The sacred site includes a concrete shrine built in 1933. On both sides of this shrine, on the hill slope, limestone outcrops define several rock shelters around narrow flat areas. The rock shelters have been numbered N1, 2, 3... on the northern side and S1, 1, 3... on the southern side. A doline (named Misukumūi Cave and also known under the name of Misokaimahora (ミソカイマホラ)) that is prolonged into an horizontal cave is located below the shrine itself.

== Archaeological Surveys ==
Ōyama Shell Mound is the first archaeological excavation survey to have taken place in Ginowan City.

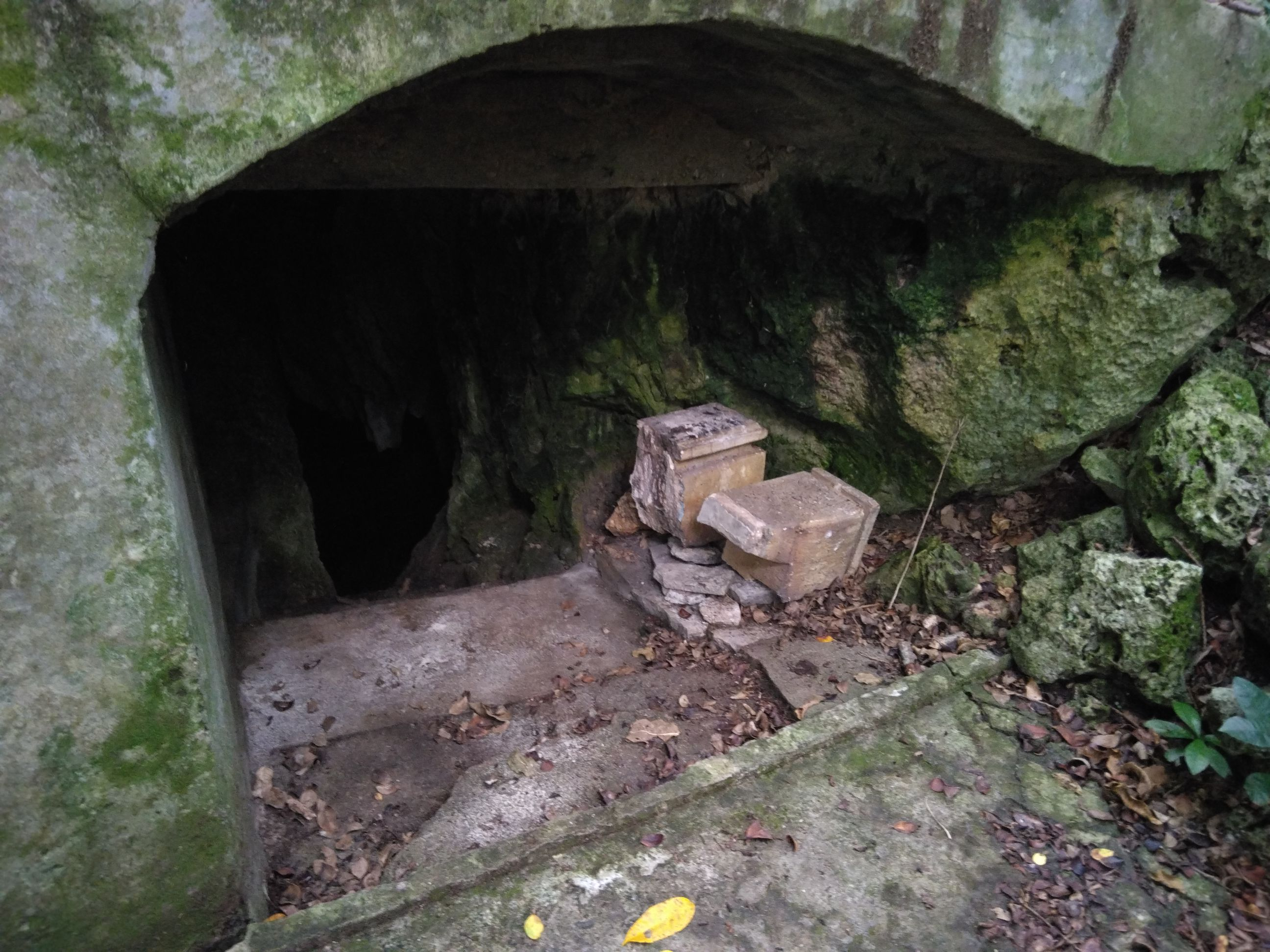
Misokaimahora cave entrance

In July 1899, Sango Katō, a teacher at the prefectural middle school from Aomori Prefecture, developing the theory that the utakis and other sacred sites of each settlement are in fact archaeological remains of former settlements, instigates a survey in the Misokaimahora doline, in the sacred site of Ōyama settlement that he records as Yahoso-mui Utaki, where he discovers three polished stone axes and a stone with a depression « the shape of which reminds one of a sakazuki.

Shinjun Tawada, botanist and pioneer of post-war Okinawan archaeology, opens test pits on the same site in 1954 and finds pottery sherds and stone axes. In 1958, he implements for the first time on Okinawa Island, in collaboration with Mitsuo Kagawa of Beppu University, archaeological excavations based on stratigraphical principles., The archaeological site is famous for this reason in the history of Okinawan archaeology, independently from the material discoveries it yielded.

== Site Description ==
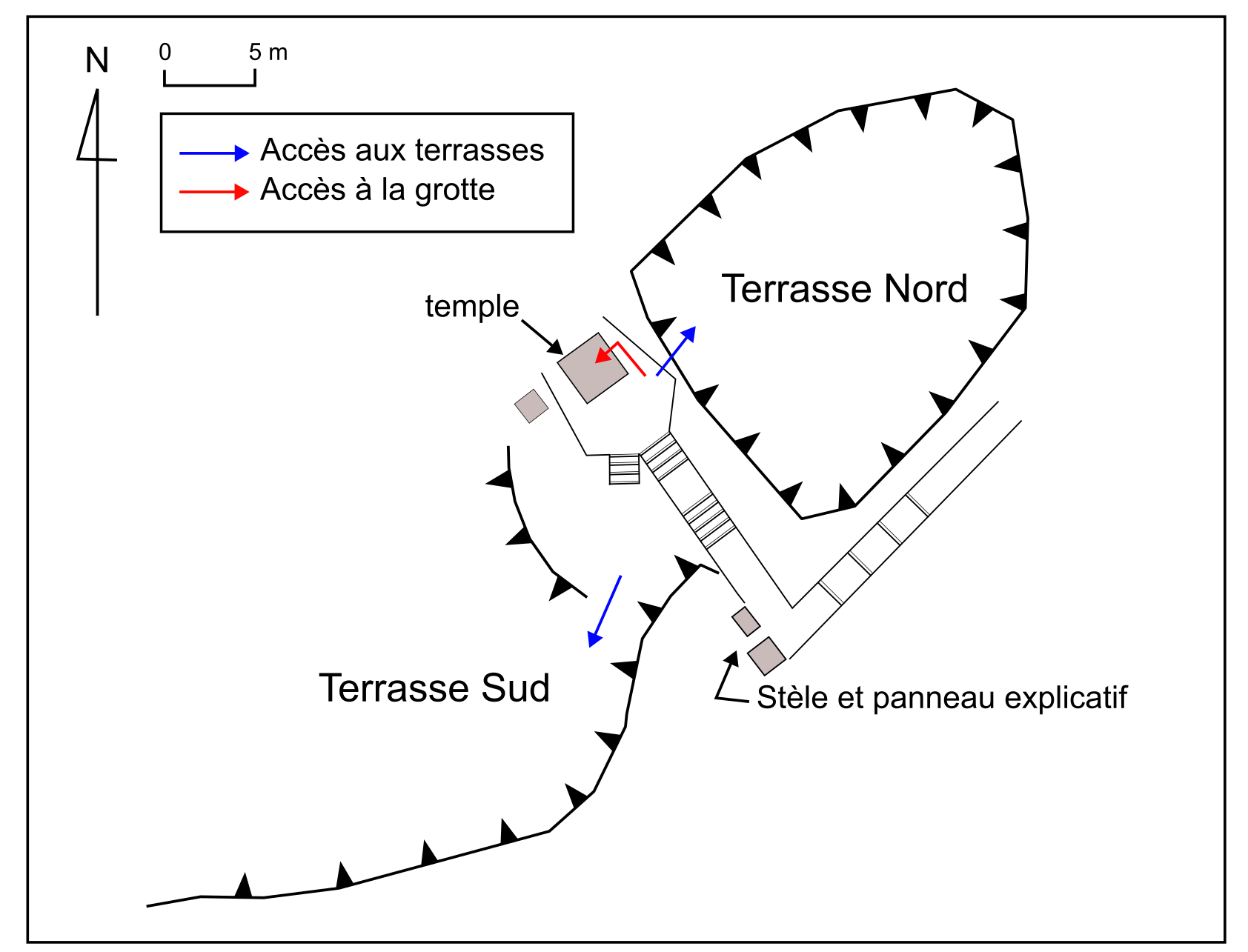
Sketch Map

=== Southern Area ===
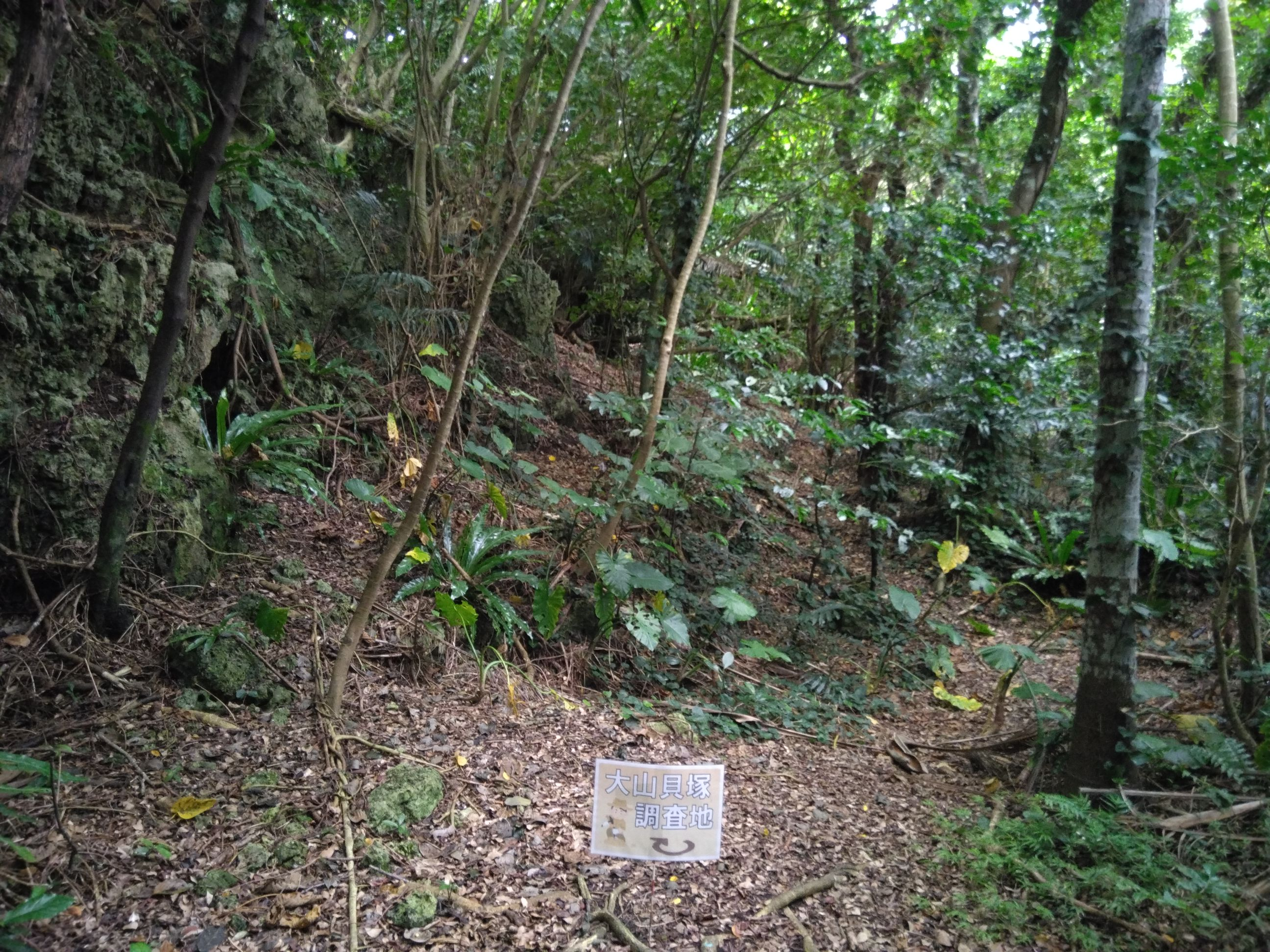
Southern Terrace

The 1958 excavations disclosed many shells, as well as land animal and fish bones that formed a very small scale shell midden, essentially in the southern part of the site, between the limestone outcrops. Pottery sherds were also collected, in front of rock shelters S1 and S2.

Rock shelter S2 had been used as a tomb in more recent periods (Ryūkyū Kingdom) and yielded many human bones.

=== Northern Area ===
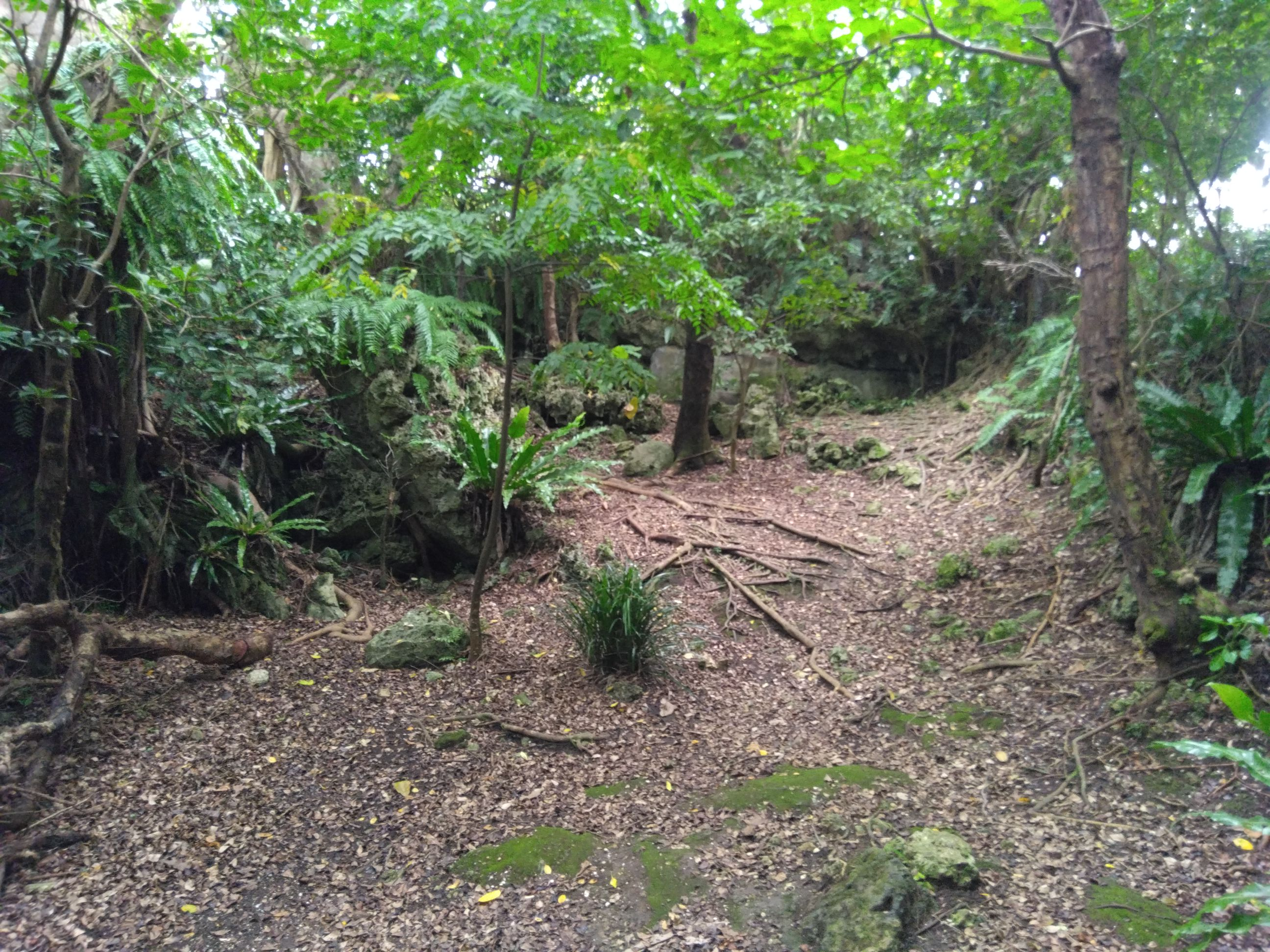
Northern Terrace

The northern terrace, closed on four sides by limestone outcrops , was probably the location where most human activities took place at the time of occupation of the site. Artefacts have been collected in five of the rock shelters of the northern area of the site, but shells and land animal or fish bones were far more scarce than in the southern area.

=== Doline ===
Land and marine shells have also been collected in the doline below the shrine, but artefacts were scarce. Human bones have been observed as well, suggesting an archaeological potential for the cave.

== Stratigraphy ==
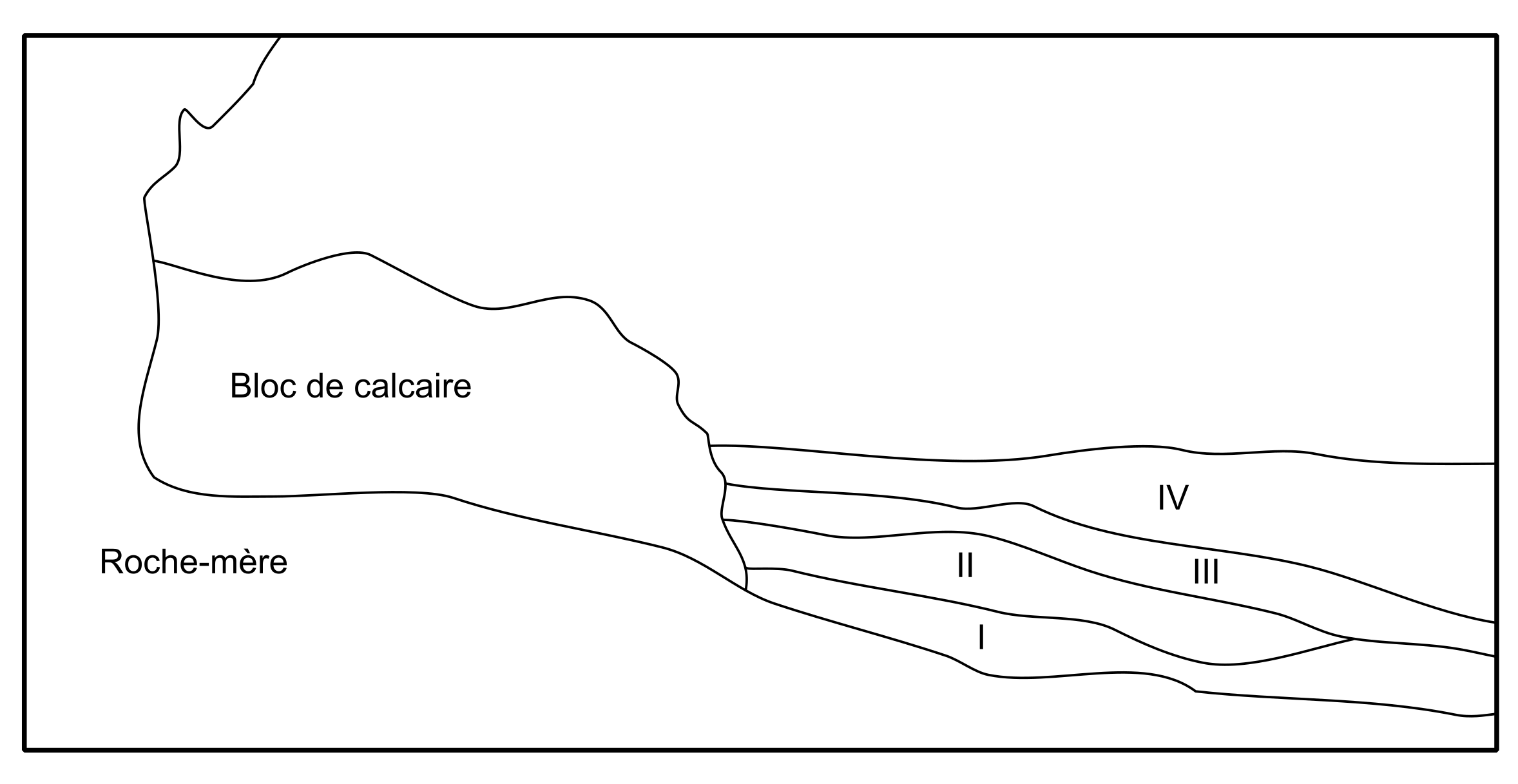
Stratigraphic Profile

Four contexts, about fifty centimetres thick, were identified during these excavations, that permitted to determine the relative ages of six different types of pottery.

The deepest context (CI) was a midden of land snail shells, while the three other contexts, (II, III, IV) were a mix of earth and shells. Above those context, a fifth one (CV) consisted in brown earth that had been deposited after the Second World War and was not considered as archaeologically relevant.

== Archaeological Artefacts ==
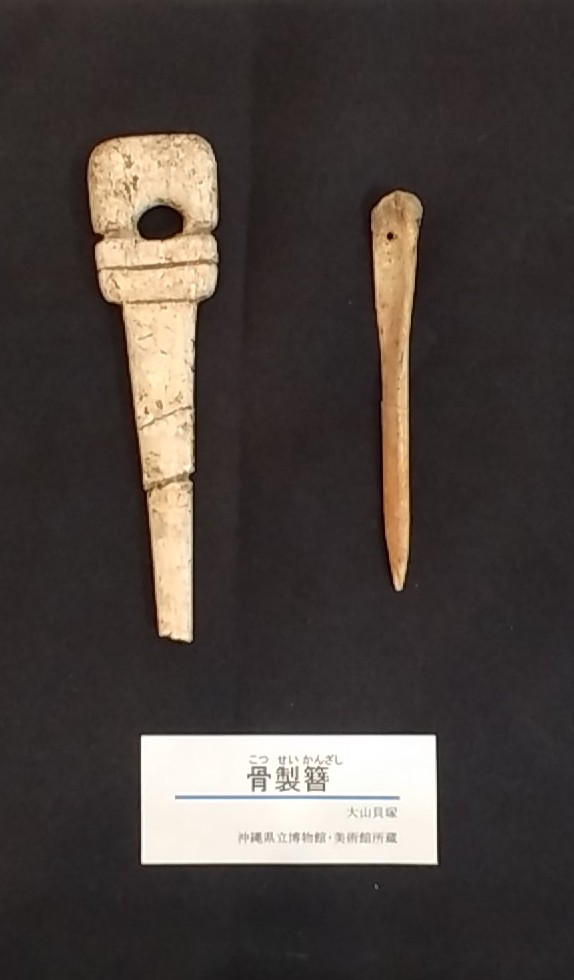
Bone hair pin from Ōyama Shell Mound

The excavations yielded artefacts dated of the Early Kaizuka period Phases IV and V. The excavation report mentions pottery, a knapped stone flat axe and some bone artefacts (two perforated artefacts, three needles, one flat artefact and one artefact in shark vertebra), as well as a large number of ecofacts (shells, animal bones, fish bones).

When the 2100 items of archaeological artefacts were moved to the prefectural museum in 1973, older pottery types than the ones mentioned in the report (Iha, Ogidō and Amami-types Omonawa-tōdō and Omonawa-seidō) and a deer antler pendent were also identified.

=== Pottery and dates ===
All of the pottery types disclosed are made using the coiling technique and fired at less than 800 degrees Celsius. The four contexts that were considered archaeologically relevant yielded six different types of pottery that have been described in the excavation report:

- Type I: Jōkonmon (条痕文) type pottery, deep pots adorned with impressions made in horizontal lines close to the opening, and four oblong buttons applied by groups of two and including impressed patterns.
- Type II: the impressions are gathered in two to four horizontal lines close to the opening, pots are divided into three groups according to variations in their shapes.
- Type III: pots adorned with very fine incised line forming herringbone or serrated patterns, close to the opening, the body becomes more globular.
- Type IV: pots with a flared opening, with one or two bands in relief by the opening, that can be adorned with incised lines or punctuations.
- Type V: as Type III, Type V presents very fine incised lines, but the pots have flared openings and carinated shoulders (type Kayauchibanta (カヤウチバンタ)).
- Type VI: Pottery with very thick walls, unadorned except for an appliqué band by the opening.

Later studies made when Okinawan prehistoric ceramic typologies were more advanced have determined that the lower contexts included sherds of pots of the Iha (伊波) and Ogidō (荻堂) types, the middle contexts sherds with an impressed decoration, and the upper contexts sherds of the Kayauchibanta type, showing that the site belonged to the Early Kaizuka period, Phases IV and V.

==== Ōyama Type Pottery ====
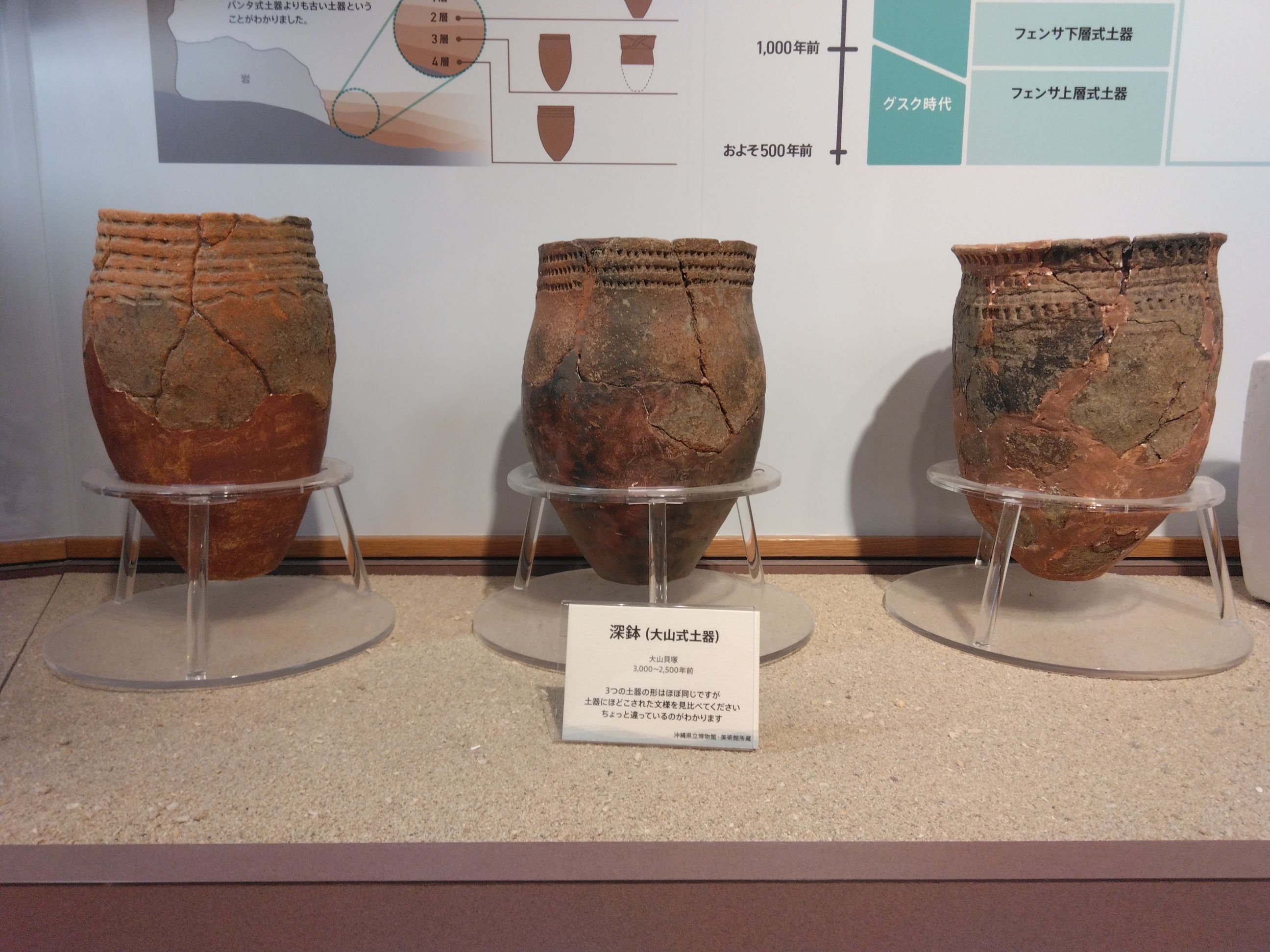
Ōyama Pottery from Ōyama Shell Mound on display at Ginowan City Museum

The pottery with impressed decoration (type II, from the middle contexts) is currently known under the name of "Ōyama Type Pottery" (大山式土器). Ōyama pottery corresponds to deep pots with a flat rim and a flat bottom, on which the decoration is only present on the part below the opening. The decoration is impressed with a spatula with an angular end and consists in two to four horizontal lines of quadrangular impressions about 5 millimetres large.

The Ōyama type is characteristic of the pottery found in Okinawa between 3000 and 2500 BP during the second half of the Early Kaizuka period Phase IV. It has become a reference type during archaeological excavations, permitting to identify easily sites of the second half of the Early Kaizuka period Phase IV.

== Posterity ==
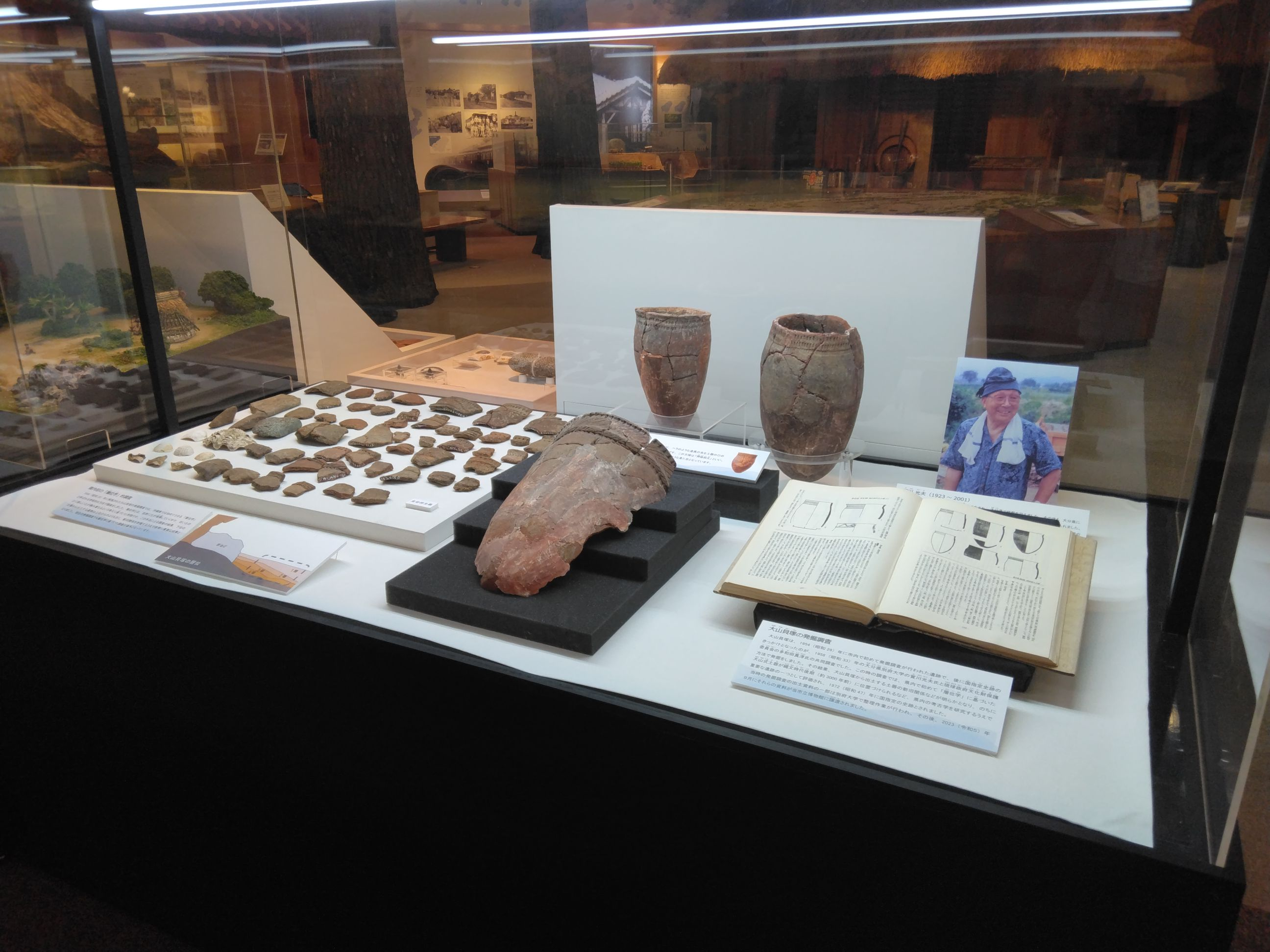
Ōyama Shell Mound Display at Ginowan City Museum

In the foreword of the excavation report, Mitsuo Kagawa states that "the adoption of new excavation techniques for this site allowed to obtain exceptional results concerning the knowledge of the beginnings of the Ryūkyūan prehistory, but it also raised a great number of questions, which is probably the greatest success of this archaeological operation".

The use of new excavation techniques that took stratigraphy into account in Ōyama Shell Mound permitted to show the existence of four consecutive archaeological contexts, and to determine the relative ages of the six pottery types collected, which finally led to the establishment of the first typological chronology for the Kaizuka period pottery. The excavations of Ōyama Shell Mound have had a major influence on the establishment of the chronology for the prehistory of Okinawa Island.

Based on the results of those excavations, Mitsuo Kagawa published in 1960 the article Reflections on the prehistoric culture of the Okinawa Islands in the Ryūkyū Archipelago, in which he proposed a chronology for the prehistory of the Okinawan Islands.

In Distributions of the shell middens of the Ryūkyū Archipelago and a chronology proposal, published in 1956, Shinjun Tawada had proposed to divide the prehistoric period into four phases: early, middle, late and final. Kagawa merged the early, middle and late phases under the name of "prehistory" and named the final phase "antiquity".

They divided the Ōyama type pottery in three sub-groups that they all dated of the middle phase of the prehistory.

In 1961, Hiroe Takamiya published the article Prehistoric culture on Okinawa Island in which he redefined the chronologies and re-attributed the Ōyama pottery to the Early Kaizuka period, making it a representative type of the end the Early Kaizuka period.

Susumu Asato later showed how Ōyama pottery was close to the Amami Islands pottery types.

The importance of the site in the history of Okinawa archaeology led to its designation as a National Historic Site in 1972.

== Nearby archaeological sites ==
The city of Ginowan included three hundred and forty-five archaeological sites in 2023, among which seventy from the Kaizuka period.

The most noteworthy sites of the Kaizuka period close to Ōyama Shell Mound are:

- Aragusuku Shichabaru (新城下原)
- Futenma Shichabaru 2 (普天間下原第二遺跡)
- Futenma Kushibaru 2 (普天間後原第二遺跡)
- Kiyuna Agaribarunubataki (喜友名東原ヌバタキ)
- Kiyūna Yamakawabaru 5 (喜友名山川原第五遺跡)
- Mashiki Ukkābaru (真志喜大川原)
- Mashiki Azamabaru 1 (真志喜安座間原第一遺跡)
- Uchidomari Kanekubaru (宇地泊兼久原遺跡)

== See also ==
- List of Historic Sites of Japan (Okinawa)
