= Mitsuo Kagawa =

Japanese archaeologist

- 賀川 光夫
- Born: January 5, 1923; Tochigi, Japan
- Died: March 9, 2001 (aged 78)
- Occupation: Archaeologist

Mitsuo Kagawa (賀川 光夫, Kagawa Mitsuo; January 5, 1923 – March 9, 2001) was a Japanese archaeologist and a professor at Beppu University in Ōita Prefecture, Japan. He committed suicide by hanging himself on March 9, 2001, as a result of the Japanese Paleolithic hoax.

== Life ==
Kagawa majored in archeology, with a focus in the Japanese Paleolithic period. In 1962 he led an excavation at the Hijiridaki cave site (聖嶽洞窟遺跡) in Ōita Prefecture. The team claimed that they discovered ancient human bones and stone tools dating back to the Paleolithic era, but later in 1999 other researchers questioned this conclusion and argued that the claim could not be proven. In a series of articles by the Japanese magazine Bungeishunjū published on January 25, February 1 and March 15, 2001, it was alleged that the stone tools discovered at the site were fabrication and indicated Kagawa had been involved in that hoax. He committed suicide and left a suicide note to proclaim his innocence.

His family filed a defamation suit against Shūkan Bunshun the same year. The Ōita district Court and the Fukuoka High Court ordered the magazine to pay the damages and issue an apology to the family of Kagawa. The magazine appealed to the Supreme Court although the appeal was rejected in September 2004. An apology statement was published on September 2, 2004, issue.

On October 25, 2003, a project team from the Japanese Archaeological Association stated that they could not find any evidence to make judgments whether there was a fabrication or not.

== See also ==
- Shinichi Fujimura
- Japanese Paleolithic hoax
- CiNii
