= Iwajuku Site =

Museum in Midori, Japan

Iwajuku site
- 岩宿遺跡 (Japanese)
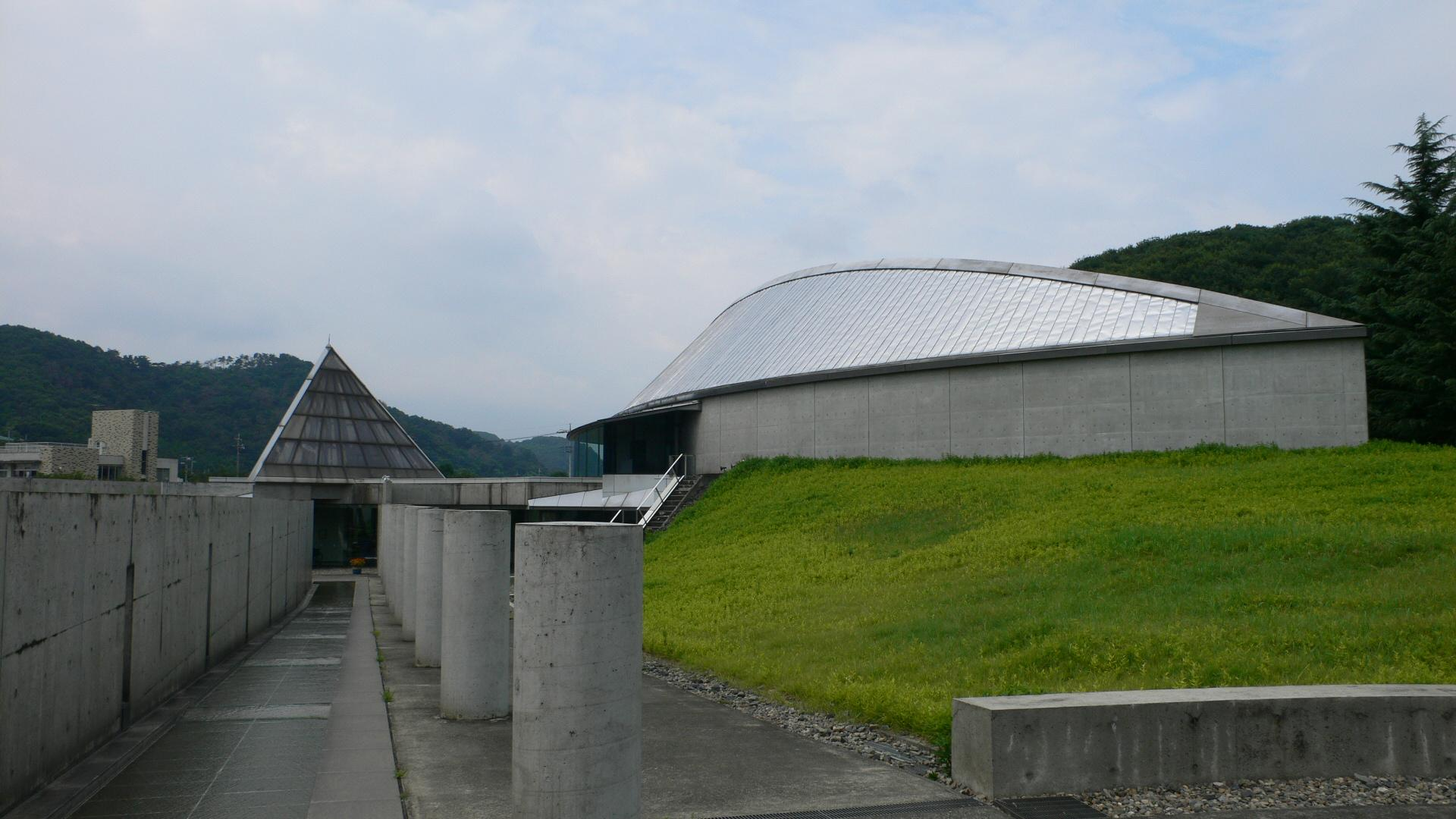
- Iwajuku Museum

- Iwajuku site Iwajuku Site (Japan)
- 36°24′0.2″N 139°17′15.0″E
- Periods: Japanese Paleolithic
- Location: Midori, Gunma Japan
- Region: Kantō region

Site notes
- Elevation: 120 m (390 ft)
- Public access: Yes (Museum at site)

The Iwajuku site (岩宿遺跡, Iwajuku iseki) is an archaeological site located in what is now the Kasuke neighborhood of the city of Midori, Gunma Prefecture in the northern Kantō region of Japan with finds from the Japanese Paleolithic period. It received protection as a National Historic Site in 1979.

== Overview ==
The site is located about 4.4 km west-southwest of JR East Kiryū Station at an elevation of 196.2 meters above sea level, and is a cutting through the central saddle of two hills extending from northeast to southwest. The site was discovered in 1947 by a seller of nattō and amateur archaeologist Aizawa Tadahiro, who passed through this cutting every day on his way to work. One day, Aizawa found a small flake of obsidian which resembled a microlith in a layer of red soil much lower than the black topsoil layer. He continued to look in the area, but could find no evidence of Jōmon pottery, but in subsequent months found numerous other stone tools, including a stone arrowhead in 1949. Puzzled by these discoveries, he visited a professor of archaeology at the University of Tokyo, but was ridiculed as it was the prevailing academic orthodoxy that the earliest settlement of Japan was by the Jōmon people and that no artifacts could (or would) be found below the layer of black Kantō loam which dates from the early Jōmon period. The fact that he had claimed to have found such artifacts was derided due to his amateur status. However, Aizawa was undeterred and continued to approach other academia, convinced that he had found something of importance. He was eventually able to convince a professor of archaeology at Meiji University to take a look at the site.

The team from Meiji University chose three locations, which were labeled "A", "B", and "C". Site A was located on the north side of the hill and contained many stone tools buried between two distinct layers of red soil. Site B was where Aizawa had first excavated stone fragments and a stone spear. Site C was located about one kilometer to the northwest of the other sites. It contained no stone tools in the red soil layer, but the black layer of soil above it contained many Jōmon pottery fragments from the earliest Jomon period, confirming that artifacts excavated from the red soil layer underneath had to date from before the earliest Jōmon period. The period was named the "Japanese Paleolithic period" and this finding overturned the prevalent theories and indicated that humans had resided in the area from before the 10th millennium BC, or since the end of the last Ice Age. Since this find, over 5,000 Late Paleolithic sites have been discovered, many at existing Jōmon archaeological sites, from southern Kyushu to northern Hokkaido.

Due to the acidic nature of the volcanic ash from which the red soil strata is made, little other than stone implements has been discovered in the Iwajuku excavations. It is known that the climate was approximately seven to eight degrees C below present averages, and the extent of subalpine forest was three hundred to four hundred meters lower in elevation than at present. Large game animals such as the now extinct Naumann elephant, along with brown bears, giant deer, tigers, wolves and monkeys inhabited the area. Little is known of the inhabitants of the Iwajuku site, and it is assumed that they were a hunter-gatherer culture without a fixed settlement.

Based on the soil strata in which they were found, and the type of tool, archaeologists have divided the site into three cultural phases:

Iwajuku I Culture dates from around 25,000 years ago with artifacts buried about 1.3 meters below the Kantō loam surface in a dark red layer of soil. In this layer 29 tools made of chert or shale were discovered, including two polished stone axes, two stone knives, a stone scrapers, and a stone wedge for splitting bones. In addition, some Lithic flakes were also found, indicating that the inhabitants had the ability to make these tools.

Iwajuku II Culture dates from about 18,000 years ago, with artifacts buried about 0.8 meters below the Kantō loam stratum. Over 180 stone tools were found in this layer, with materials including chert, obsidian, andesite, shale, hornfels, and agate. The finds included two stone arrowheads, eight blades, four tools for cutting wood, and many lithic flakes and lithic cores. The stone tools found in this layer are smaller than those found in the Iwajuku I layer. The presence of obsidian was also a surprise, as this material is not native to Gunma Prefecture, and the raw materials must have some from sites hundreds of kilometers away in Nagano, Tochigi, or even Kōzushima in the Izu Islands.

Iwajuku III Culture was found to contain stone arrowheads and a thumb-shaped scraper, but remains undefined.

A museum has been built near the ruins and is the center of research and investigation. Some artifacts from the site are on display at the Meiji University Museum in Tokyo. These items were designated Important Cultural Properties in 1975.

== See also ==
- List of Historic Sites of Japan (Gunma)
