= Shellmidden Period =

Archaeological period of the Ryukyu prehistory

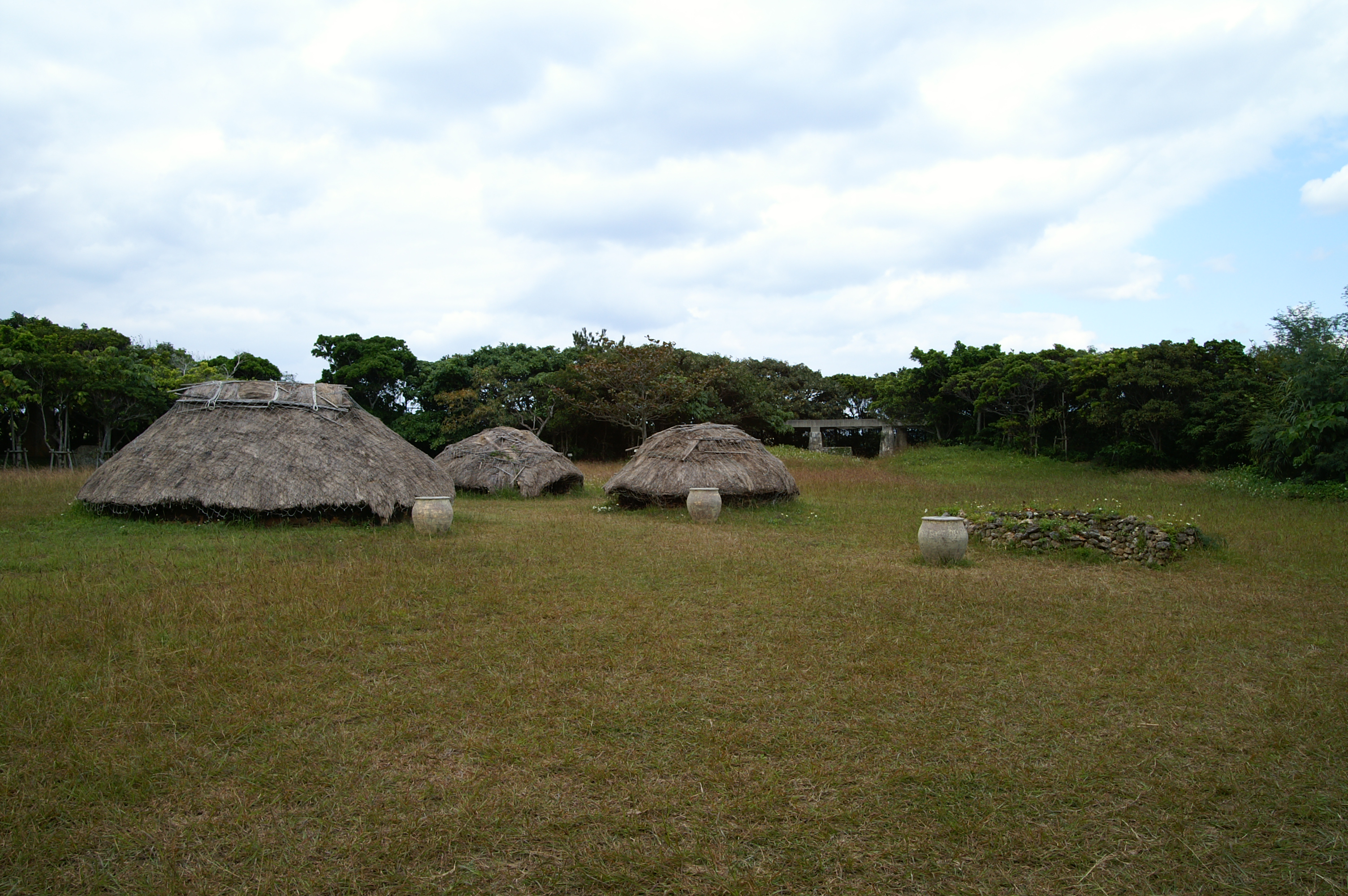
Nakabaru Site

The Shellmidden or Shellmound Period (Japanese: 貝塚時代, Kaizuka jidai) is one of the periods of the prehistory of the Okinawa and Amami Islands. It is defined as the period of the prehistory in the Amami and Okinawa Islands with pottery. It lasts from 8000 BCE to the 11th or 12th centuries CE. The culture that develops during this period is called the Shellmidden Culture (Japanese: 貝塚文化, Kaizuka bunka). It is divided into Early and Late Shellmidden Period, the difference residing in a shift in the settlement location and the development of trade with the neighbouring cultures, first Japan, and then China and Korea.

Economy is mainly based on gathering, fishing and hunting, the principal resources exploited being acorns, fishes and shellfishes. Settlements are limited in size, with the apparition of perennial villages by the end of the Early Shellmidden Period. The material culture is dominated by an important pottery production and very characteristic bone and shell artefacts.

From the 12th century, the Shellmidden Culture is followed by the Gusuku Culture, the first agricultural culture of the Okinawa Islands.

In the Sakishima Islands, the southernmost part of the Ryūkyū Archipelago, the period parallel to the Okinawan Shellmidden Period is called the Sakishima Prehistoric Period. The Amami Islands, the northernmost part of the Ryūkyū Archipelago, first showed strong cultural relation with the Shellmidden Culture, before they shifted and got closer to the Japanese cultural sphere.

== Divisions ==
=== Divisions ===
Shellmidden Period chronologies started being developed by the 1950s. The term of "Shellmidden Period" was introduced by the Okinawa Archaeological Society in 1978.

Tawada Chronology / Current Chronology

The "Current Chronology" is based on the one established by Shinjun Tawada during the 1950s to the 1980s.

The period is called the Shellmidden Period and is divided into Initial Shellmidden Period, Early Shellmidden Period, Middle Shellmidden Period and Late Shellmidden Period. The Initial Shellmidden Period is further divided into Early Phase, Middle Phase and Late Phase.

The Initial Shellmidden Period broadly goes from 8000+ BCE to 2200 BCE, the Early Shellmidden Period goes from 2200 BCE to 1200 BCE, the Middle Shellmidden Period from 1200 BCE to 300 BCE and the Late Shellmidden Period goes from 300 BCE to the 11th-12th centuries CE.

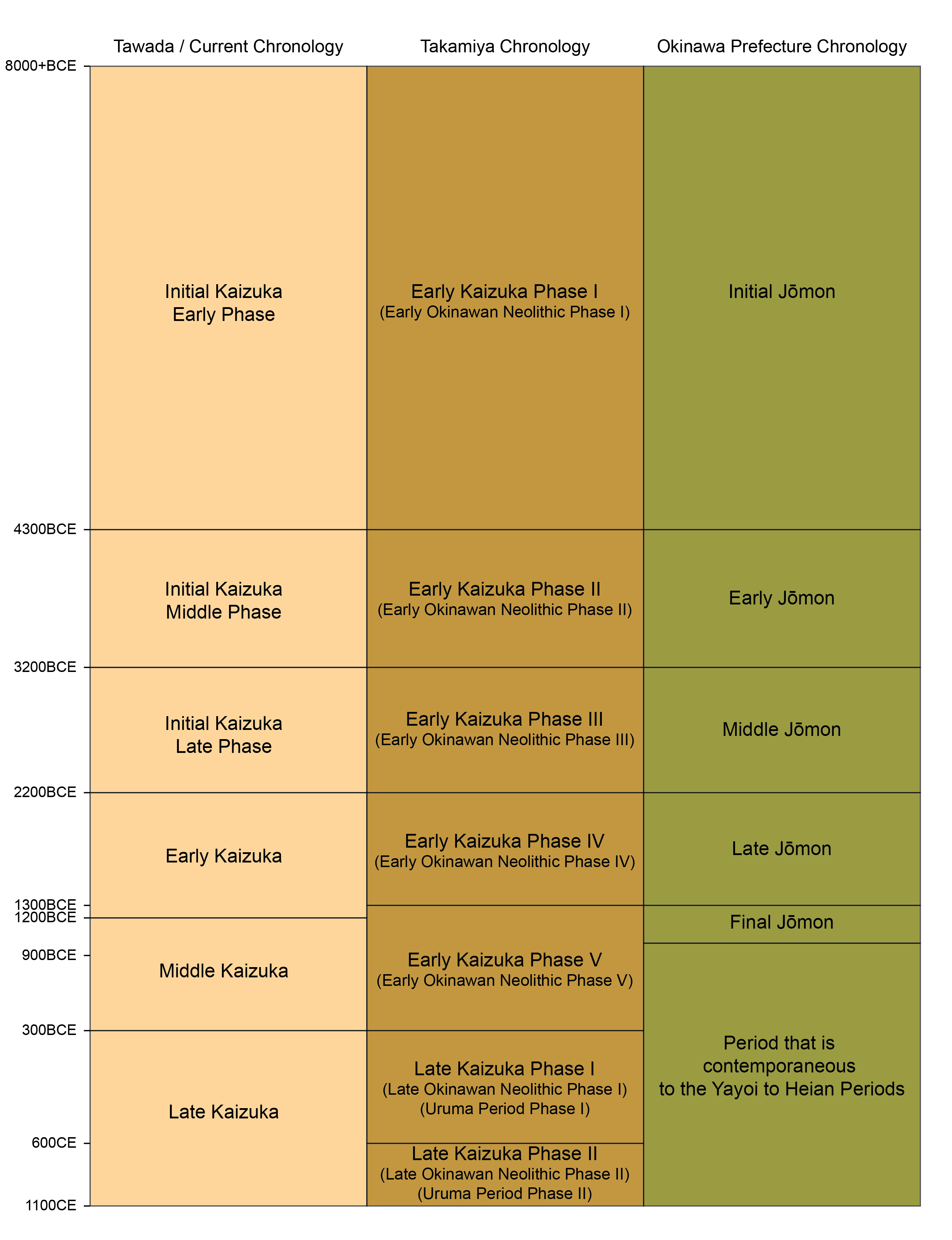
Shellmidden period Chronologies

Takamiya Chronology

This chronology, established by Hiroe Takamiya in the 1960s to the 1980s is very widely used by the Okinawan scholars. The term "Shellmidden Period" is sometimes replaced by "Okinawan Neolithic Period". The period is divided into the Early Shellmidden Period and the Late Shellmidden Period. The Late Shellmidden Period is sometimes called the Uruma Period. The Early Shellmidden Period is divided into Phases I to V, the Late Shellmidden Period in Phases I to IV. In recent articles, it is rather divided into two phases than four (Phases I and II).

The Early Shellmidden Period Phase I goes from 8000+ BCE to 4300 BCE, Phase II from 4300 BCE to 3200 BCE, Phase III from 3200 BCE to 2200 BCE, Phase IV from 2200 BCE to 1300 BCE, Phase V from 1300 BCE to 300 BCE. The Late Shellmidden Period Phase I goes from 300 BCE to 600 CE; Phase II from 600 CE to 1100 CE.

Okinawa Prefecture Chronology

This chronology was established by the Editorial Committee of Okinawa Prefecture History in 2003. It is broadly based on the divisions established by Takamiya, but uses a Japanese terminology, naming the Early Shellmidden Period the "Jōmon Period" and the Late Shellmidden Period the "Period that is contemporaneous of the Yayoi to Heian Periods" (Japanese: 弥生～平安並行時代). It is mainly used in the publications by the Okinawa Prefectural Archaeological Center and the Prefectural Museum.

=== Relations between the Shellmidden Culture of Okinawa/Amami and the Jōmon Culture of Japan ===
There are at least three points of view concerning the relations between the Shellmidden Culture of Okinawa/Amami and the Jōmon Culture of Japan.

The Shellmidden Culture is a sub-culture of the Japanese Jōmon Culture, and the Japanese divisions of the Jōmon Period should be applied.

This point of view used to be defended by, inter alia, Hiroe Takamiya and Isamu Chinen. Based on the first discoveries of prehistoric pottery in Okinawa (Matsumura in 1920, Tawada in 1956), the Shellmidden Period pottery was identified to Jōmon pottery. Takamiya said that the two cultures were identical at least until the phase of the Sobata Type Pottery and then gradually differed from the Early or Middle Jōmon, leading to the creation of an original culture in the Ryūkyū Archipelago. Chinen said that not only the pottery was similar, but also the lithics and bone artefacts. He said that other archaeologists insisted too much on the differences (absence of cord marking on pottery, absence of dogū ritual statuettes, absence of ritual stone sceptres, absence of storage pits) instead of focusing on the similarities.

The Shellmidden Culture and the Jōmon Culture are distinct cultures, focusing on the differences between the two cultures.

This point of view is defended by, inter alia, Shiichi Tōma, Michio Okamura, Naoko Kinoshita or Kensaku Hayashi.

The first three insist on the differences in the spiritual culture, with the absence of dogū ritual statuettes or ritual stone sceptres from sites of the Shellmidden Period in Okinawa, the fact that what is considered as jōmon cultural traits in the Shellmidden Culture, such as pit dwellings, crouched burials of humans and dogs or the burning of houses are in fact traits found in many north-east Asian cultures, while the elements that can only be found in the Jōmon Culture are absent and the fact that the body ornaments (bracelets, pendants, beads, shark teeth, earrings, butterfly-shaped artefacts) are completely different in the two cultures. Hayashi insists on the difference in the way of life, with people of the Jōmon Culture having the habit of digging storage pits to store food, which is a trait that is hardly seen in the Shellmidden Culture.

The Shellmidden Pottery is Jōmon Pottery, but the Shellmidden Culture is not Jōmon Culture, a point of view accepting both the similarities and differences of the two cultures.

This point of view is mainly defended by Shinji Itō.

He says that despite the fact certain particularities can be observed in the shapes, the pottery of the northern part of the Ryūkyū during the Jōmon Period should be called the Ryūkyū Jōmon Pottery, that there is, as far as pottery is concerned, a frontier that can be seen between the Tokara Islands and the Kumage Islands and that the Shellmidden Culture was born from the conjunction of three natural conditions (the existence of a subtropical forest, the existence of coral reefs that help provide a stable supply in marine resources, and an environment propitious to the wild boars).

== Introduction ==
There are many sites of the Palaeolithic Period in the Okinawa and Sakishima Islands that yielded fossil human remains. There is then an interregnum with no archaeological sites, from 10,000 to 8000 BCE in the Okinawa Islands and from 18,000 to 5000 BCE in the Sakishima Islands. It is not clear if the populations of the Shimotabaru Culture in the Sakishima Islands, or the ones of the Shellmidden Culture in the Okinawa Islands, are related to the previous palaeolithic populations.

== Early Shellmidden Period ==
Since the Shellmidden Period is defined as the period of the prehistory with pottery, its upper limit is regularly pushed earlier with the successive discoveries of older pottery. It is currently placed by 8000 BCE.

The fundamental components of the Shellmidden Culture though, mainly appear during the Early Shellmidden Period Phase III, which is considered as an essential stage for the development of the culture, when the coral reefs reach their maturity.

=== Livelihood ===
A great diversity of vegetal resources is used as soon as the beginning of the Early Shellmidden Period: 30 types of different vegetal remains were identified in Aragusuku-shichabaru 2 Site (Ginowan-Chatan) from the Early Shellmidden Period Phase I, 60 types in Ireibaru Site (Chatan) from Phase II or in Mēbaru Site (Ginoza) from Phase IV.

The use of acorns is documented as early as the Early Shellmidden Period Phase I in Amami (Hangō Site, 11400-11200 cal.BP) and Phase II in Okinawa (Ireibaru Site), and perdures throughout the period, with an extensive collect of chinquapin beech and Okinawan oak acorns. In Ireibaru (Phase II) and Mēbaru (Phase III) the acorns have been found in bamboo baskets placed in water to wash the tannin before they could be eaten. Sites with physical remains of the ecofacts are scarce, but the extensive presence of hammers, anvils and grinding stones, related to the processing of the acorns on sites from the whole period tells the relative importance of the acorns in the diet. From these tools it seems that the acorns were first cracked opened and then reduced to flour

At the beginning of the Early Shellmidden Period, during Phase I, proteins are essentially obtained through the hunt of wild boars. Bows and arrows are introduced, very probably from Jōmon Japan. Pit traps have also been found (arranged in lines in Futenma Kushibaru 2 Site, Early Shellmidden Phase IV). However, by 6000 yBP, as the coral reefs start to appear, the economy begins to shift towards a dependence to marine resources, the percentage of wild boars in the diet decreasing constantly during Phase II and staying very low compared to the marine resources for the rest of the Shellmidden Period (including the Late Shellmidden Period). During Phases I and II the coral reefs are not yet very developed and the resources are scarce. Starting from Phase III the marine resources retrieved from the archaeological sites greatly increase, and their variety (dugongs, sea turtles, reef fishes and shellfishes...) show that the shallow parts of the coral reefs (inō), easily reached at low tide, are widely exploited. The appearance of artefacts interpreted as fishnet sinkers in Phase III hints at the development of the fishing techniques.

=== Settlements ===
The oldest sites in the Early Shellmidden Period are mainly found in caves and on the sand hills by the coast (ex. Yabuchi Cave, Noguni Shellmound Group). In the Early Shellmidden Period Phase IV, the sites are rather concentrating more inland in the higher areas, and in the Early Shellmidden Period Phase V, sites present concentrations of pit-dwellings gathered in villages. At the very end of the period, the sites start to shift toward the sand dunes along the coast, that will be their preferred location during the following Late Shellmidden Period.

Most settlements present a combination of smaller (2x2m or 3x3m) and larger (5x5m) dwellings, generally squared with rounded angles (circular ones also exist). Although most of the identified dwellings are pit-dwellings with a line of small limestone boulders on their periphery (Ufuta III Site, Nakabaru Site...), there are also some without the limestone lining, or stone-paved dwellings, not necessarily dug into the ground (the Shinugudō Site in Miyagi Island has 42 pit dwellings, with and without stone liming, and 12 stone-paved ones). All those types are found during the Early Shellmidden Period Phase V and the fine chronology of their appearance is still discussed.

=== Material Culture ===
==== Pottery ====
The oldest earthenware from Amami and Okinawa has long been thought to be the Iha and Ogidō types, currently dated of Early Shellmidden Phase IV. Then, with the successive excavations, the introduction of pottery in Amami and Okinawa appeared older and older, and recent discoveries have been dated around 10,000 BP both in Amami (Shitabaru Cave) and Okinawa (Yabuchi Cave).

Recent tries at sorting and nomenclature have produced the following tentative chronology for the Early Shellmidden Period Phase I: Sekishoku-jōsenmon types (red with striated patterns, 10,000～7,400 BP) → yūken-oshibikimon types (shouldered with impressed patterns 8,900～8,000 BP) → mumon-usude types (thin unadorned 8,000～6,900 BP) → Nantō-tsumegatamon types (adorned with fingerprints or nail incisions 7,300～6,600 BP).

During Phase II appear the Jōkonmon types (linear mark patterns).

As far as it is possible to deduce it from the diffusion of pottery styles, it seems that the cultural spheres in the Okinawa and Amami Islands fluctuate a lot. Starting with Phase III, local types with a strong identity (particular designs in the decorative patterns) develop (Murokawa-kasō pottery, Omonawa-zentei pottery...). This is during this phase as well that the characteristic closed "tsubo" shapes appear and that a specific ceramic culture area going from the Tokara Islands to the Okinawa Islands starts to be defined.

At the beginning of Phase IV, the common cultural sphere seems to englobe all the Okinawa and Amami Islands, with very similar pottery produced in the whole area. Despite differences in the local earth available, all potteries present a very sandy component.

Regional characteristics appear again as soon as the second half of Phase IV, although the cultural spheres overlap: the Iha, Ogidō and Ōyama types are produced in the Okinawa Islands and the south of the Amami Islands, and the Katoku IB and Katoku II types in the north and the south of the Amami Islands. The southern Amami Islands seems to mix the influences of both the cultural spheres.

A common identity develops anew during Phase V and is even already visible in similarities between the late Ōyama pottery examples and the early Omonawa-seidō type of Amami at the very end of Phase IV. Although the pottery types produced in the two areas at the very beginning of Phase V are distinct (Murokawa and Murokawa-jōsō for Okinawa and Omonawa-seidō and Inutabu in Amami), they seem to constantly influence each other, with similarities in shapes but differences in decorative patterns. The convergence culminates by the middle of Phase V, with types such as Ushuku-jōsō / Uzahama or Kinen I common to Okinawa and Amami. At the end of Phase V, the Nakabaru type pottery introduces new shapes, such as shallow bowls and plates that will become more common in the following Aharen'ura-kasō type of the Late Shellmidden Period.

==== Lithic ====
There is no such striking evolution in the stone tools: the lithic assemblage is practically complete by the end of Phase II, and only refines in the following phases. Most of the tools are ground, very few are just knapped. Pressure flaking is almost not observed. The main components are stone axes and mullers / hammers and grinding slabs / anvils. Mullers can be round or elongated

Stone arrowheads appear by Phase I in Amami and II in Okinawa, probably as an influence of the Japanese Jōmon Culture. They are very rare during the whole length of the period (one or two examples per site, when they are present).

Chisel-shaped tools appear by Phase III, as well as thin blades and circular pedestal-like objects.

Recycling is common and it is not rare to repurpose a broken stone axe as a muller or hammer.

==== Bone artefacts ====
Until Phase II, pendants are mainly made from boar bones, which is a common point with Jōmon Japan, even though the shapes differ. Starting with Phase II, pendants and large drills can be made of boar, whale or dugong bones.

Needles, smaller drills and smaller artefacts appear by Phase III, probably linked to the refinement in the lithic tools. This is during Phase III too that the number and variety of ornaments greatly increase: beads, pendants, hair ornaments, bracelets... Most of the personal ornaments of the Shellmidden Period are made of bone or shell.

Butterfly-shaped bone artefacts and beast-shaped bone artefacts, some of the most emblematic artefacts of the Shellmidden Period, appear in Phase IV. The butterfly-shaped ones seem to originate from butterfly-shaped stone artefacts of Phase III, while the beast-shaped ones are said to find their origin in stone magatama beads. They can be made a of single piece of bone or by combining several. It seems the simple ones are older than the complex ones, and that the size as well increases with time. The bones used vary between wild boar, fish, whale and dugong, although dugong greatly dominates.

Starting with Phase III, shark teeth pendants, another very characteristic ornament of the Shellmidden Culture, appear in the assemblage. They can be made from fossil shark teeth (from the Shimajiri Stratum, found in the southern and central parts of the island) or fresh ones. From Phase IV, there are ornaments made from shell, bone or stone that imitate the shape of the shark teeth.

==== Shell artefacts ====
Shell artefacts are very common as soon as the beginning of the Early Shellmidden Period. They are a very important component of the assemblage.

During Phase I, shell implements that seem to be imitations of stone projectile points have been found in very old sites such as Yabuchi Cave or Bugeidō Cave. Those artefacts are not produced after Phase I.

Spoons and scrappers made from green turban shells or their opercula are very common. A great variety of shells are used to make beads and pendants, as well as shell bracelets, that are an emblematic item of the Shellmidden Culture.

Starting with Phase III, the artefacts become smaller, more refined and more polished. The shell beads in particular reach very small sizes. There is also a diversification of the type of shells used, probably due to the development of the coral reefs. Artefacts that have been interpreted as fishnet sinkers, mostly made of pierced bivalve, appear during this phase as well, hinting at the development of new fishing techniques. Containers characteristic of the Shellmidden Culture, probably for boiling water, and named shell kettles, made from giant triton shells, also appear in Phase III.

=== Trade ===
Exchanges inside the Shellmidden Culture sphere are particularly well illustrated by the diffusion of common ceramic types through the whole area. There also seem to have been times when pottery was produced in a unique area and then distributed in the whole cultural sphere.

Very large quantities of unprocessed allogenous tool stones are retrieved from the sites, coming from various locations, sometimes from different islands as soon as the Early Shellmidden Period Phase I.

Chert comes from the Motobu Peninsula and is found in sites all over Okinawa Island as soon as the Early Shellmidden Period Phase II. Andesite comes from Kume Island. Green phyllite and schist, used for the stone axes, and the coarse grain sandstone used for mullers / hammers and grinding slabs / anvils, are easily found in the northern part of Okinawa Island and the Kerama Islands. Dolerite, used for axes as well, is very rare on the main Okinawa Island, and must have been imported from the neighbouring Kerama Islands, or even from Tokunoshima or Amami Island.

Archaeological sites have also yielded sherds from pottery imported from Jōmon Japan, showing that relations outside of the cultural sphere existed even at this early stage.

Sobata type pottery, produced in Kyūshū Island, is found in sites from Phase III and locally produced Sobata type pottery also exists in Okinawa (Ufudōbaru, Toguchi-agaribaru, Irei-baru).

Ichiki type pottery, produced in southern Kyūshū Island, is often found in sites of the beginning of the Early Shellmidden Period Phase IV in Amami and Okinawa.

Obsidian tools, mainly made of high-quality material from Koshi-dake, a mountain in western Kyūshū, are also found in Early Shellmidden Period sites in Amami and Okinawa starting in Phase IV. Obsidian is mainly used for projectile points. Jade from Japan is found on sites of this period as well.

=== Funerary practices ===
There are very few tombs found for the first phases of the Early Shellmidden Period. A recent discovery in Sakitari Cave has been attributed to the Early Shellmidden Period Phase I. It is probably a simple earth pit burial. Discoveries are more common starting with Phase IV. They show a great variety in funerary practices, with human remains discovered in rock shelters, in primary or secondary burials. Sometimes the bones have been burnt. The habit of depositing giant clams with the body, that perdures throughout the whole length of the Shellmidden Period, is first documented from sites of Phase IV.

== Late Shellmidden Period ==
The Late Shellmidden Period starts by 300 BCE and lasts until the adoption of agriculture in the Gusuku Period, by the 11th or 12th century. Its main characteristic is the development of trade, first with the Japanese Islands and then with China. This important trade is called the "Shell Road Trade".

=== Livelihood ===
There is not fundamental change in the livelihood during the Late Shellmidden Period, whether in Phase I or II. Subsistence is still based on the collect of acorns and the main protein source is still the marine resources.

Shellfishes are still an important component of the diet. They are acquired in the areas around the coral reefs. This is also the area from which the fishes found in archaeological context come from. In the Okinawa Islands, parrotfishes are the main species consumed, while in the Amami Islands, the species are more varied. This could be due to differences in the development of the coral reefs in the two areas, or in differences in fishing techniques. Terrestrial mammals such as wild boars are also occasionally hunted.

=== Settlements ===
During the Late Shellmidden Period Phase I, the settlements once again come closer to the coast at the top of the sand dunes. It is not clear if this shift is linked to the establishment of the Shell Trade, a change in the diet, the necessity to be closer to the reefs to claim ownership...

Pit-dwellings continue to exist but the habitations gradually shift to pillared buildings above the ground that become the most common type of dwellings in the Late Shellmidden Period Phase II. The pillared buildings are rectangular and are disclosed in excavations by alignments of postholes. At first the alignments of postholes and the building shapes are irregular. The pillars only start to be regularly spaced by the 8th century CE.

=== Material Culture ===
==== Pottery ====
===== Phase I =====
Pottery becomes coarser, less adorned and the variety of types decreases, despite the long time-span of the period. It is nevertheless clearly technologically and stylistically derived from the pottery of the Early Shellmidden Period. During Phase I, the characteristic pottery types are unadorned pots with pointy bases in Okinawa and pots with incised patterns and pedestals in Amami.

By the very beginning of the period, until about the start of the common era, unadorned pots with pointy bases are also found in the Amami area, but by the beginning of the common era, under the influence of the northern agricultural communities, the pottery undergoes a drastic evolution toward pots with incised patterns and pedestals, that will be characteristic of the ceramic assemblage of Amami for the rest of Phase I. Those types of pottery are often referred to as "Amami-types".

The pots in the Okinawa Islands being unadorned, typologies are mainly based on differences in proportions and are less detailed than for the previous period. At the end of Phase I, the pots tend to become larger. It is possible that the influence of the last Amami-type is at the origin of the evolution of the pointy bottoms toward constricted flat bottoms, that will be characteristic of the Late Shellmidden Period Phase II.

===== Phase II =====
The pottery produced during the Late Shellmidden Period Phase II is called "constricted flat bottom type" (in Japanese くびれ平底土器). This pottery is found both in Amami and Okinawa Islands, but with regional differences.

The Kaneku type is produced until the end of the 10th century in the northern part of the Amami Island, before it is replaced by Japanese-influenced Hajiki pottery, and until the beginning of the 11th century in the southern part of the Amami Islands (it seems the production even goes on during the Gusuku Period).

A local version of Hajiki pottery is also produced in Amami as soon as the end of the 9th century, and is said to be the ancestor of the later Gusuku pottery jars.

In the Okinawa Islands, the Akajanga type is produced between the late 6th and 9th centuries and the Fensa-kasō type between the 9th and the beginning of the 11th century. The decorative patterns of the Fensa-kasō type gradually spread northward as far as Tokunoshima. As for the types in Amami, the Okinawan types continue to be produced during the Gusuku Period as well.

==== Lithic ====
On Okinawa Island, green phyllite and schist, that were the main stones used to make stone axes during the Early Shellmidden Period, are practically abandoned in favour of dolerite. Dolerite is harder to obtain, but produces larger axes of better quality. At the same period, the number of large stone axes also increases in sites of the Amami Islands, where dolerite is native. In Amami, most sites yield axes whose dolerite come from a single location, suggesting that each community had a monopoly over one dolerite source. Although the Shellmidden Culture populations do not practice agriculture, it is possible that the adoption of those large axes is an influence from the neighbouring agricultural populations

Stone tools are rare both in the Amami and Okinawa Islands for the Late Shellmidden Period Phase II. Most of them are mullers and grinding slabs, with a few ground stone axes in Okinawa only. This is probably due to the shift toward metallic implements that started during the preceding phase.

==== Shell Artefacts ====
The use of shell ornaments persists in the Late Shellmidden Period, but their variety and number drastically decrease compared to the previous stage.

Although the shell bracelets are mainly known as artefacts from the Okinawa Islands found in the Japanese Islands, they are frequently found in Okinawa as well, in sites of the Late Shellmidden Period Phase I. They do not seem to be present in the assemblage after the shell trade with Japan collapses.

The most common and most studied shell artefacts for the Late Shellmidden Period Phase II are the Hirota-josō type shell amulets (kaifu) and the green turban shell artefacts.

The shell amulets are found in the Amami and Okinawa Islands from the 6th to the 9th centuries.

Perforated artefacts and shell spoons made of great turban shell are found in larger quantity in the Amami Islands during the Late Shellmidden Period Phase II. Large quantities of shells have also been unearthed from several sites of this period on Amami-Ōshima, probably used for trade with Japan.

==== Metal ====
There are very little metallic artefacts unearthed from the Late Shellmidden Period in the Okinawa Islands. In the Amami Islands, during the Late Shellmidden Period Phase II, they mainly include fishing implements (fish hooks and blades interpreted as tools to detach shells from rocks). Blades of the end of the period are of a particular shape characteristic to the Okinawa and Amami Island, that will perdure during the Gusuku Period.

Local production of metallic implements started in the Amami Islands as soon as the Late Shellmidden Period Phase II, in the late 9th century. Tuyeres have been found on sites from this period. It is thought that the techniques acquired in Amami at that time later spread southward to the Okinawa Islands in the Gusuku Period.

=== Trade ===
Although exchanges with the northern Japanese islands existed in the Early Shellmidden Period, they developed to become a real large-scale trade in the Late Shellmidden Period. As suggested by the name of "Shell Road Trade", the main product sought by the agricultural populations of Japan were the large tropical shells that can be found in the coral reefs of the Okinawa Islands. They exchanged them for pottery (possibly containing food), iron tools (axes, projectile points), bronze mirrors, glass beads, stone tools or coins. As much as 37 sites of this period (Aharen'ura, Anchi-no-ue...) have yielded hoards of such shells (for a total of 151 hoards) in the Okinawa Islands. Shell bracelets from Ryūkyū have been found in 60 sites in the island of Kyūshū.

At the beginning of the Late Shellmidden period Phase I, a commercial road was established to send conchs and cone shells to Northern Kyūshū, where they were processed into bracelets and other ornaments and sent as far north as the Hokkaidō Island. Traces of shell bracelet processing have been found at the Takahashi site (Minamisatsuma City) on the Satsuma Peninsula. Shell bracelets lost their popularity in Japan after a few centuries (by 100-300 CE) with the introduction of copper bracelets. Consequently, the quantity of Japanese pottery found in Amami and Okinawa Islands after this period drastically decreases. However, the quantity of Okinawan pottery found in Amami and Amami pottery found in Okinawa increases, showing a shift in the commercial relations. It is by this period as well that foreign pottery with talc tempering appears in Okinawa. It is not clear if this type of pottery is from (or strongly influenced by) the Korean peninsula or mainland China.

The development of commerce probably engendered changes in the Shellmidden society, with the frequent landing of brokers who came to buy shells, and people probably specializing in shell fishing, processing and transport. However, clues of a stratification of the society are mainly seen in the northern islands of the Ryūkyū Archipelago, such as Tokunoshima, during the following Phase II.

Although the popularity of the shell bracelets among the Japanese populations decreased in the latter half of the Japanese Yayoi Period, with the spread of the Kofun Culture, Okinawan shells became once again popular. They fell out of fashion again by the Late Kofun Period, when the trend for bracelets shifted to bronze and stone.

Although conchs and cone shells were still exported to make bracelets and ornaments for the horses, between the second half of the Late Shellmidden Period and its final stage, the trade turned mainly on green turban shells. Green turbans were used to product shell spoons and sake cups for the trade with Japan (Yamato), and mother-of-pearl inlay for the trade with both Yamato and China. Green turbans have been excavated in large quantities from sites of the 6th to 8th centuries CE in Amami Island such as Domori Matsunoto, Yōmisaki or Kominato Fuwaganeku. In the Okinawa Islands, green turbans have also been excavated in large quantities on Kume Island. The sites from which large quantities of green turbans have been found are currently unevenly distributed, with a concentration in the northern part of Amami Island and on Kume Island, and the remainder scattered around the northern tip of Okinawa Island, Ie Island and Yonaguni Island. Many Chinese Kaiyuan Tongbao cash coins were excavated from sites of the same period on Kume Island, and there are various theories about the Southern Islands Trade Routes of this period.

By this period, Japanese historical documents such as the Nihon Shoki or the Shoku Nihongi record exchanges between the Yamato Court and the islands of the Ryūkyū archipelago. In 616, Empress Suiko receives a delegation from Yaku (Yakushima), in 677 there is the record of the visit of people from Tanegashima in Asuka-dera. In 699 the Yamato Court received visitors from 'Tane, Yaku, Amami and Tokan' (Tanegashima, Yakushima, Amami and Tokunoshima) and in 715 from 'Amami, Yaku, Tokan, Shinkaku and Kumi' (Amami, Yakushima, Tokunoshima, Ishigaki and Kume). In 753, Jianzhen is said to have arrived at 'Akinaha Island' on his way to Japan, which is said to be the main island of Okinawa. After this, the Okinawan place names disappear from the Japanese records for a time.

=== Final Stage and transition to the Gusuku Period ===
==== Settlements ====
In the final stages of the Late Shellmidden Period, by the 10th-11th centuries, settlements present patterns where each above-ground pillared habitation is coupled with another building interpreted as a raised floor granary (Kushikanekubaru Site in Chatan, Fukidashibaru Site in Yomitan...). In the following Gusuku Period, there will be a tendency to divide the villages between a residential area with the habitations and a storage area with the granaries.

Many sites of this period present very large concentrations of postholes from which it is very difficult to find any building plan (for instance Ireibaru D Site in Chatan).

==== Trade ====
By the final stage of the Late Shellmidden Period (10th century), the Chinese Northern Song dynasty, established in 960, took measures to promote trade with neighbouring countries. Trade between the Song, Japan, Goryeo and the Ryūkyū Islands flourished from this time onwards.

The site of Gusuku in Kikai Island seems to become a nodal point in the commercial relations between the Ryūkyū Islands and Japan. It yielded Kyūshū-style Hajiki earthenware, Sue ware, Yue ware celadon, white porcelain and ash-glazed stoneware bowls from the 9th to 11th centuries. This may have brought societal changes to Kikai Island and its society, marking the end of the Shellmidden Period in the Okinawa Islands and the transition to the Gusuku Period.

==== Transition to the Gusuku Period ====
The Gusuku Period is marked by the spread of agriculture and a remarkable increase in the population. Emblematic artefacts of the Gusuku Period include Chinese celadon and porcelain, Kamuiyaki ware from Tokunoshima Island and stone pots from Nagasaki (Kyūshū Island). This assemblage is found as a set in the Amami, Okinawa and Sakishima Islands.

The Gusuku Site, on Kikai Island, seem to have been fundamental for the development of the Gusuku Culture. It seems that the culture started in the northern part of the Ryūkyū Archipelago and spread southward, before it bloomed on Okinawa Island by the 12th century. Ceramic studies show that the Gusuku Culture was adopted quite quickly in some islands, and quite slowly in some others, maybe due to differences in areas with immigration-led adoption and areas with local diffusion.
