= Nobuko Iwaki =

Japanese politician (born 1946)

- 井脇 ノブ子
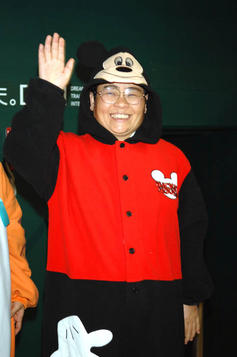
- Iwaki in 2006

Member of the House of Representatives
- In office 11 September 2005 – 21 July 2009
- Constituency: Kinki PR

Personal details
- Born: 11 February 1946 (age 80) Minamiamabe, Ōita, Japan
- Party: Liberal Democratic
- Other political affiliations: NFP (1996–1998); LP (1998–2001)
- Education: Beppu University; Takushoku University

Nobuko Iwaki (井脇 ノブ子, Iwaki Nobuko; born 11 February 1946) is a Japanese politician of the Liberal Democratic Party, was a member of the House of Representatives in the Diet (national legislature) until 2009. A native of Minamiamabe District, Ōita, she attended Beppu University as an undergraduate and received a master's degree from Takushoku University. She was elected to the House of Representatives for the first time in 2005 after running unsuccessfully for the House of Councillors in the Diet in 2003.

== See also ==
- Koizumi Children
