= Kyoko Funahashi =

Japanese bioarchaeologist

- 舟橋 京子
- Occupation: Bioarchaeologist
- Awards: Grand Prize Award - Japanese Archaeological Association

Academic work
- Discipline: Archaeology
- Sub-discipline: Bioarchaeology
- Institutions: Kyushu University

Kyoko Funahashi (in Japanese: 舟橋 京子) is a Japanese bioarchaeologist, who specialises in osteology in East Asia in prehistory. She is an associate professor in the Faculty of Comparative Studies in Society and Culture at Kyushu University. She has worked extensively on tooth extraction in the Jomon period and its relationships to social change and gender. She was awarded the Grand Prize Award from the Japanese Archaeological Association in 2012, and had previously been awarded in 2011 the Kyushu Archaeological Society Award.

== Selected works ==
- 'Gender Expression from the Jomon to Yayoi Periods in Western Japan: A Case Study of Ritual Tooth Extraction' Japanese Journal of Archaeology 9 (2022): 145–172
- Miyamoto, K., Obata, H., Adachi, T., Amgalantgus, T., Funahashi, K., Gakuhari, T., ... & Yonemura, K. (2016). Excavations at Daram and Tevsh sites: A report on joint Mongolian-Japanese excavations in outer Mongolia.
- Yonemoto, Shiori, Tatsuro Adachi, Kyoko Funahashi, Nobuhiko Nakano, and Yasuhito Osanai. "The Strontium analysis on the human skeletal remains from the Emeelt Tolgoi Site and Bor Ovoo Site in Bayanhongor, Mongolia." (2018).
