= Shinichi Fujimura =

Japanese amateur archaeologist

- Born: May 4, 1950 (age 76); Kami, Miyagi, Japan
- Occupation: Archaeologist
- Known for: Claiming to find Lower Paleolithic and Middle Paleolithic artifacts

Shinichi Fujimura (藤村 新一, Fujimura Shin'ichi; b. May 4, 1950) is a Japanese amateur archaeologist who claimed he had found a large number of stone artifacts dating back to the Lower Paleolithic and Middle Paleolithic periods. These objects were later revealed to be forgeries.

== Success ==
Fujimura was born in Kami, Miyagi, in 1950. After graduating from a high school in Sendai, he obtained a job in a manufacturing company. He became intrigued by archaeology when he was a child, finding shards of Jōmon pottery in the backyard of his house.

In 1972 Fujimura began to study archaeology and to look for Paleolithic artifacts during his holidays. Within the few years to follow, he rose to fame among amateur and academic archaeologists in Sendai by which he was appointed the head of the NGO group, Sekki Bunka Kenkyukai (石器文化硏究会, literally translated to stone tool culture research association) in 1975. Fujimura discovered and excavated many Paleolithic stone artifacts in Miyagi prefecture, such as at Zazaragi site in 1981, Nakamine C site in 1983 and Babadan A site in 1984. From a cross-dating investigation of the stratum these stone tools were estimated to be about 50,000 years old.

He established his reputation as a leading amateur archaeologist because he found most of the artifacts on his own. He even became known as the archaeologist with the "divine hands".

After this success, he participated in 180 archaeological digs in northern Japan and almost always found artifacts, of increasing age. Based on his discoveries the history of the Japanese Paleolithic period was extended to about 300,000 years. Most of the archaeologists did not question Fujimura's work and this discovery was written in the history textbooks. Later he gained a position as a deputy director at the private NGO group Tohoku Paleolithic Institute.

== Criticism ==
Despite the acquiescence from the archeologists, some geologists and anthropologists claimed the discovery was dubious and lacked consistency with the geologic analysis of the sites.

Takeoka Toshiki at the Kyoritsu Joshi University published an article

Stone artifacts which were recently discovered at Japanese Upper Paleolithic sites, such as Kamitakamori site are so different from the characteristics of these Upper Paleolithic stones. ... Those are the same as the stone shafts of the Jōmon period in their shape or fabrication method. ... This site and their archaeological finds are undoubtedly abnormal, a kind of OOPARTs.

Shizuo Oda and Charles T. Keally also mentioned some peculiarities in their article

After talking to the principal investigators, Okamura and Kamata, and a thorough study of the relevant publications and the lithics themselves, we have concluded that no proven artifacts of human origin predating 30,000 B. P. exist in Miyagi prefecture. The claims of Okamura, Kamata, and some other Miyagi archaeologists that they have discovered a "Lower Palaeolithic" are based on flawed research and are dubious claims.

== Disclosure ==
On October 23, 2000, Fujimura and his team announced another finding at the Kamitakamori ruins near Tsukidate in Miyagi Prefecfure. Fujimura claimed to have found the postholes of an early Paleolithic period dwelling, which would have been the nation's oldest, between 600,000 and 120,000 years old.

On November 5, 2000, the newspaper Mainichi Shimbun published pictures of Fujimura digging holes and burying 61 objects at Kamitakamori, which he and his team later unearthed. The pictures had been taken one day before his Kamitakamori discovery was announced. Fujimura confessed and apologized the same day in a press conference, saying that he had been "possessed by an uncontrollable urge". At first, Fujimura denied his previous discoveries were faked.

In 2001 the Japanese Archaeological Association reviewed all of Fujimura's "discoveries" and concluded that he'd planted artifacts at 42 excavation sites. The following year, the association formally concluded that none of the objects supposedly found by Fujimura were correctly dated, finding that some bore marks from metal implements, and that some were just stones.

Fujimura was expelled from both the Japanese Archaeological Association and the Tōhuku Paleolithic Institute, whose chairman resigned as a result of the scandal.

== See also ==
- Japanese Paleolithic hoax
- Piltdown Man
- Beringer's Lying Stones
- Semir Osmanagić
