= Japanese Paleolithic =

Period of human inhabitation in Japan predating the development of pottery

Japanese Paleolithic period
- 35,000 BCE – 14,000 BCE
| Jōmon period |
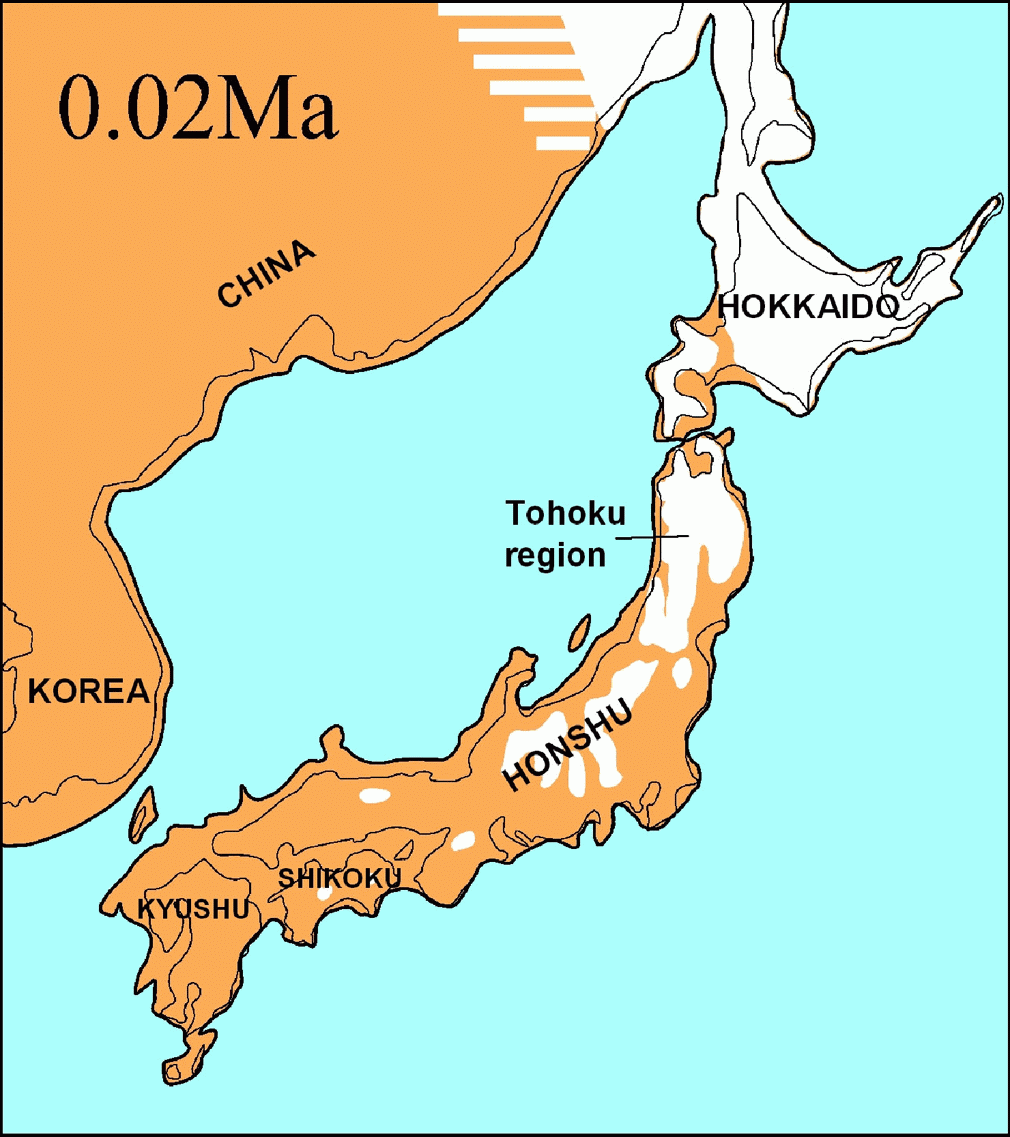
- Japan at the Last Glacial Maximum in the Late Pleistocene about 20,000 years ago
- Location: Japan

The Japanese Paleolithic period (旧石器時代, kyūsekki jidai) is the period of human inhabitation in Japan predating the development of pottery, generally before 10,000 BC. The starting dates commonly given to this period are from around 40,000 BC, with recent authors suggesting that there is good evidence for habitation from c. 36,000 BC onwards. The period extended to the beginning of the Mesolithic Jōmon period, or around 14,000 BC.

== Archaeology of the Paleolithic period ==
The study of the Paleolithic period in Japan did not begin until quite recently: the first Paleolithic site was not discovered until 1946, after the end of World War II. Due to the previous assumption that humans did not live in Japan before the Jōmon period, excavations usually stopped at the beginning of the Jōmon stratum (14,000 BC), and were not carried on further. However, since that first Paleolithic find by Tadahiro Aizawa, around 5,000 Paleolithic sites have been discovered, some of them at existing Jōmon archaeological sites, and some dating to the Pleistocene era. Sites have been discovered from southern Kyushu to northern Hokkaido, but most are small and only stone tools have been preserved due to the high acidity of the Japanese soil. As the Paleolithic peoples probably occupied the wide coastal shelves exposed by lower sea levels during the Pleistocene, the majority of sites are most likely inundated.

The study of the Japanese Paleolithic period is characterized by a high level of stratigraphic information due to the volcanic nature of the archipelago: large eruptions tend to cover the islands with levels of Volcanic ash, which are easily datable and can be found throughout the country as a reference. A very important such layer is the AT (Aira-Tanzawa) pumice, which covered all Japan around 21,000–22,000 years ago.

In 2000, the reputation of Japanese archaeology of the Paleolithic was heavily damaged by a scandal, which has become known as the Japanese Paleolithic hoax. The Mainichi Shimbun reported the photos in which Shinichi Fujimura, an amateur archaeologist in Miyagi Prefecture, had been planting artifacts at the Kamitakamori site, where he "found" the artifacts the next day. He admitted the fabrication in an interview with the newspaper. The Japanese Archaeological Association disaffiliated Fujimura from its members. A special investigation team of the Association revealed that almost all the artifacts which he had found were his fabrication.

Since the discovery of the hoax, only a few sites can tentatively date human activity in Japan to 40,000–50,000 BC, and the first widely accepted date of human presence on the archipelago can be reliably dated c. 35,000 BC. One of the most important sites dating to these times is Lake Nojiri, which dates to 37,900 years Before Present (~36,000 BC), which shows evidence of butchery of two of the largest extinct megafauna species native to Japan, the elephant Palaeoloxodon naumanni, and the giant deer Sinomegaceros yabei.

Humans are suggested to have first reached the Ryukyu Islands around 32-24,000 years ago, which was likely a causal factor of the extinction of endemic species on that archipelago, such as the dwarf deer Cervus astylodon.

== Ground stone and polished tools ==
The Japanese Paleolithic is unique in that it incorporates one of the earliest known sets of ground stone and polished stone tools in the world, although older ground stone tools have been discovered in Australia. The tools, which have been dated to around 30,000 BC, are a technology associated in the rest of the world with the beginning of the Neolithic around 10,000 BC. It is not known why such tools were created so early in Japan.

Because of this originality, the Japanese Paleolithic period in Japan does not exactly match the traditional definition of Paleolithic based on stone technology (chipped stone tools). Japanese Paleolithic tool implements thus display Mesolithic and Neolithic traits as early as 30,000 BC.

== Paleoanthropology ==
The Paleolithic populations of Japan, as well as the later Jōmon populations, appear to relate to an ancient Paleo-Asian group which occupied large parts of Asia before the expansion of the populations characteristic of today's people of China, Korea, and Japan.

During much of this period, Japan was connected to the Asian continent by land bridges due to lower sea levels. Skeletal characteristics point to many similarities with other aboriginal people of the Asian continent. Dental structures are distinct but generally closer to the Sundadont than to the Sinodont group, which points to an origin among groups in Southeast Asia or the islands south of the mainland. Skull features tend to be stronger, with comparatively recessed eyes. According to “Jōmon culture and the peopling of the Japanese archipelago” by Schmidt and Seguchi, the prehistoric Jōmon people descended from a Paleolithic populations of Siberia (in the area of the Altai Mountains). Other cited scholars point out similarities between the Jōmon and various paleolithic and Bronze Age Siberians. There were likely multiple migrations into ancient Japan.

According to Mitsuru Sakitani, the Jōmon people were an admixture of two distinct ethnic groups: A more ancient group (carriers of Y chromosome D1a) that were present in Japan since more than 30,000 years ago and a more recent group (carriers of Y chromosome C1a) that migrated to Japan about 13,000 years ago (Jomon).

Genetic analysis on today's populations is not clear-cut and tends to indicate a fair amount of genetic intermixing between the earliest populations of Japan and later arrivals (Cavalli-Sforza). It is estimated that modern Japanese have about 10% Jōmon ancestry.

Jōmon people were found to have been very heterogeneous. Jōmon samples from the Ōdai Yamamoto I Site differ from Jōmon samples of Hokkaido and geographically close eastern Honshu. Ōdai Yamamoto Jōmon were found to have C1a1 and are genetically close to ancient and modern Northeast Asian groups but noteworthy different to other Jōmon samples such as Ikawazu or Urawa Jōmon. Similarly, the Nagano Jōmon from the Yugora cave site are closely related to contemporary East Asians but genetically different from the Ainu people, who are direct descendants of the Hokkaido Jōmon.

One study suggests that the Jōmon people were rather heterogeneous, and that many Jōmon groups were descended from an ancient "Altaic-like" population (close to modern Tungusic-speakers, represented by Oroqen), which established itself over the local hunter gatherers. This “Altaic-like” population migrated from Northeast Asia in about 6,000 BC, and coexisted with other unrelated tribes and or intermixed with them, before being replaced by the later Yayoi people. C1a1 and C2 are linked to the "Tungusic-like people", which arrived in the Jōmon period archipelago from Northeast Asia in about 6,000 BC and introduced the Incipient Jōmon culture, typified by early ceramic cultures such as the Ōdai Yamamoto I Site.

== See also ==
- List of archaeological periods
- Prehistoric Asia

== Bibliography ==
- The History and Geography of Human Genes, Cavalli-Sforza, Princeton University Press, ISBN 0-691-08750-4
- Ainu:Spirit of a Northern People, National Museum of Natural History, Smithsonian Institution, ISBN 0-9673429-0-2
- Shoh Yamada (2002). Harvard Asia Quarterly "Politics and Personality: Japan's Worst Archaeology Scandal", Volume VI, No. 3. Summer
