= Sean K =

- ショーン K
- Born: Shinichiro Kawakami; 21 March 1968 (age 57)
- Other names: Sean McArdle Kawakami
- Occupations: Caster; radio personality; narrator
- Years active: 2000s–2016
- Agent: Sunday
- Notable work: Make It 21 (2000–16); Prime Factor (2013–15)
- Television: Daiwa Shōken Jōhō TV (2001–11); Channel Nama Kaiten TV News Zap! (2014–16)

Sean K (ショーン K, Shōn Kei; born 21 March 1968) is a former Japanese radio personality, narrator and tarento. His business name is Sean McArdle Kawakami (ショーン･マクアードル川上, Shōn Makuādoru Kawakami). His real name is Shinichiro Kawakami (川上 伸一郎, Kawakami Shin'ichirō). He is represented with Sunday.

Sean K's career as a Japanese news and business commentator abruptly ended in 2016 after weekly magazine Shukan Bunshun exposed his fabricated academic background including claims of an MBA from Harvard Business School.

== Filmography ==
=== Radio ===
Year	Title	Network
2000	Make It 21	J-Wave
2013	Prime Factor	J-Wave

=== Television programmes ===
Year	Title	Network	Notes
	Sangyō Shin Jidai o Hiraita Chōsen-sha-tachi: Magellan no Tamashī	TV Tokyo, BS Japan	Caster
	Make It 21 TV	Daiwa Shōken Jōhō TV	
	Insight×On-sight: Machi kara Mieru Economy	Daiwa Shōken Jōhō TV	
2005	3-Kagetsu Topic Eikaiwa: 1-Nichi Marugoto Eigo de Hanasou! Igai ni Shiranai Nichijō Hyōgen	NHK-E	Narrator
2006	3-Kagetsu Topic Eikaiwa: Harumi Kurihara no Chōsen Kokoro o Tsutaeru Eigo	NHK-E	Narrator
2010	Tokudane!	Fuji TV	Friday commentator
2014	Channel Nama Kaiten TV News Zap!	BS Sk-Per!	Monday commentator; Originally Wednesday until 18 January 2016; Also appears in any day or may become MC
2015	Hōdō	TV Asahi	Wednesday commentator; Originally Thursday until 20 January 2016
	BS Fuji Live Social TV The Compass	BS Fuji	

=== Advertisements ===
Title	Notes	Ref.
Intel "Intel, Haitteru"	Narration	
Kirin Beverage Gogo no Kōcha "Kirin: Gogo no Kōcha"	Narration	
Nissan "Fugue"		
Daiwa Securities Group	Narration	
Mitsubishi Motors Outlander Plug-in Hybrid Electric Vehicle		

== Bibliography ==
Year	Title
2004	Sean K no Soku Akira Sokutō Bijinesu Eigo Training
2005	Seikō Zenya: 21 no Kigyō Story
2007	MBA Kōgi-sei Chūkei: Keiei Senryaku
2009	Professional no 5 Jōken
	Jibun-ryoku o Kitaeru
