= Tadahiro Aizawa =

Japanese archaeologist (1926–1989)

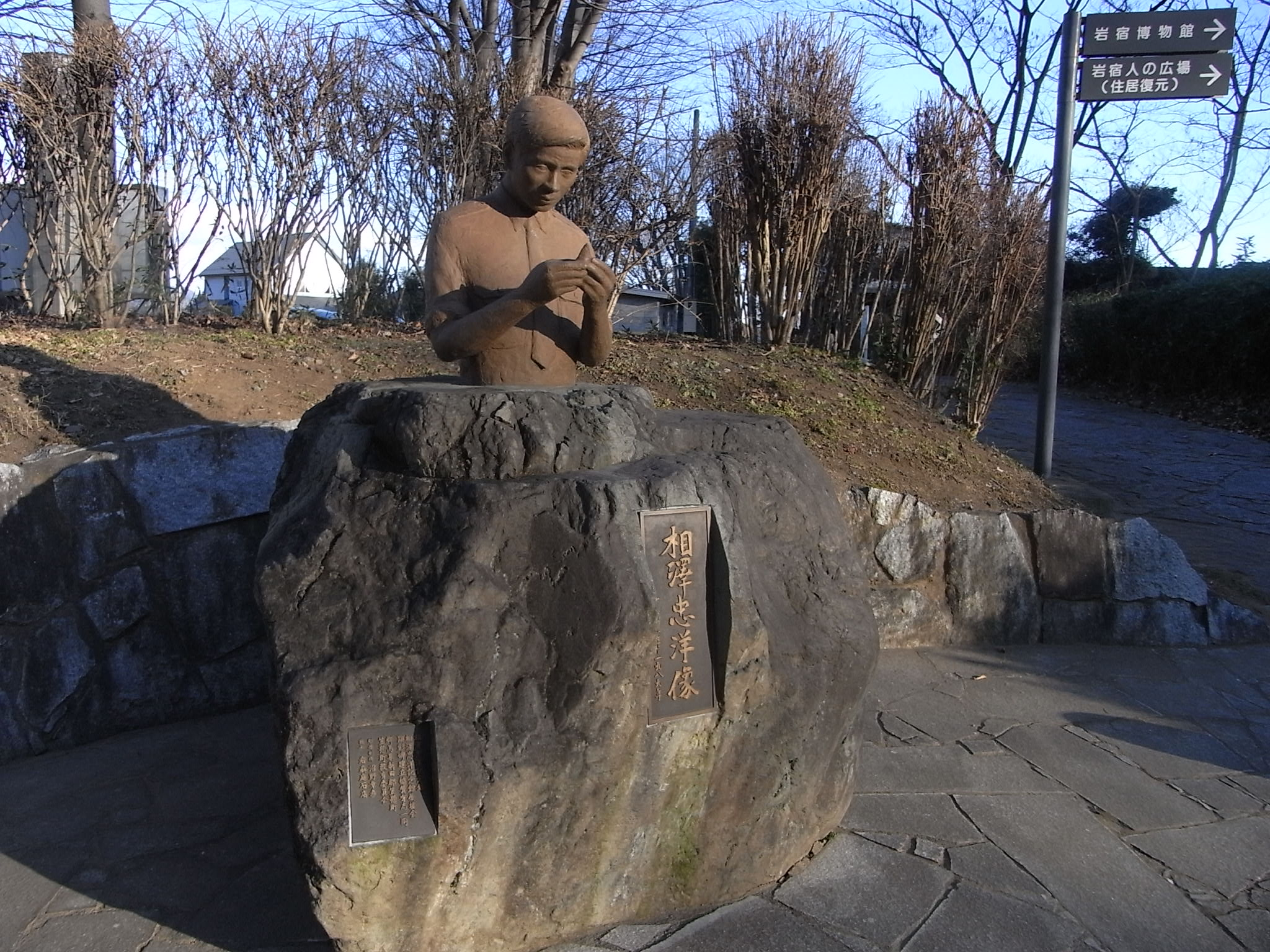
- Statue of Tadahiro Aizawa.
- Born: June 21, 1926; Japan
- Died: March 22, 1989 (aged 62)
- Other name: 相沢 忠洋
- Occupations: merchant, an amateur archaeologist

External image
- Photo of Aizawa

Tadahiro Aizawa (相沢 忠洋, Aizawa Tadahiro; June 21, 1926 – May 22, 1989) was a Japanese archaeologist. Aizawa, an amateur stone tool collector who had been peddling nattō, discovered a microlith in Iwajuku, Gunma in 1946, which was recognized in 1949 as a Paleolithic site that had previously been thought not to exist in Japan.
