= Japanese Archaeological Association =

Archaeological Association in Japan

The Japanese Archaeological Association (日本考古学協会, Nihon kōkogaku kyōkai) (JAA) was established in 1948 and is a nationwide organization concerned with the archaeology of Japan and the preservation of its Cultural Properties. At the time of its establishment there were 81 members and by 1998, 3,387 members, with the majority involved in cultural property management and research in government agencies.

The JAA awards a Grand Prize, which in 2012 was awarded to Kyoko Funahashi.

== Publications ==
Since 1994 the JAA has published the journal Nihon Kōkogaku (Journal of the Japanese Archaeological Association) (日本考古学).

== See also ==
- Buried Cultural Properties
- List of National Treasures of Japan (archaeological materials)
