= Beppu University =

Private university in Ōita Prefecture, Japan

- 別府大学
- Type: Private university
- Established: 1908
- Location: Beppu, Ōita, Japan
- Campus: Beppu Campus 33°18′42.7″N 131°29′25″E Ōita Campus 33°12′14.2″N 131°32′21″E
- Website: www.beppu-u.ac.jp

Beppu University (別府大学, Beppu daigaku) is a private university in Ōita Prefecture, Japan. It has campuses at the cities of Beppu and Ōita. The predecessor of the school was founded in 1908, and it was chartered as a university in 1954.

== Alumni ==
- Nobuko Iwaki - politician
