= Calocedrus huashanensis =

Calocedrus huashanensis Temporal range: Oligocene

Scientific classification
- Kingdom: Plantae
- Clade: Tracheophytes
- Clade: Gymnospermae
- Division: Pinophyta
- Class: Pinopsida
- Order: Cupressales
- Family: Cupressaceae
- Genus: Calocedrus
- Species: †C. huashanensis

Binomial name
- †Calocedrus huashanensis Shi, Zhou, & Xie

Extinct species of conifer

Calocedrus huashanensis is an extinct incense-cedar species in the family Cupressaceae described from a group of isolated foliage fossils including stems and leaves. The species is known from Oligocene sediments exposed in the Guangxi Zhuang Autonomous Region, China. It is one of a number of extinct species placed in the living genus Calocedrus.

== History and classification ==
Calocedrus huashanensis is represented by a series of compression fossil specimens in lacustrine deposits belonging to the Oligocene aged Ningming Formation of western Ningming County. As of 2011 the formation had not been dated by radiometric methods, making a precise date difficult to obtain. The Ningming Formation overlies the Dazha Formation, which has been dated to the Eocene and palynological studies of the pollens preserved in the Ningming Formation have given a general age of Oligocene. The pollen studies are supported by both the fish and plant megafossils that are found in the formation, both of which support an Oligocene age. The flora preserved in the formation appears to have been a subtropical evergreen forest almost exclusively dominated by flowering plants. C. huashanensis is one of only three species of conifers found in the formation. The species is one of two members of the family Cupressaceae while the third conifer species, the plum-yew Cephalotaxus ningmingensis was described in 2010.

The type specimens for C. huashanensis are located in two different repositories. The holotype specimen, number "NHMG-010420", is currently preserved in paleobotanical collections housed at the Natural History Museum of Guangxi Zhuang Autonomous Region. The two paratype specimens, "PB21097" and "PB21098", are housed at the Nanjing Institute of Geology and Palaeontology, a branch of the Chinese Academy of Sciences in Nanjing. The specimens were studied by a group of three Chinese paleobotanists, led by Gongle Shi, all from the Nanjing Institute of Geology and Palaeontology. Gongle Shi and team published their 2012 type description for C. huashanensis in the American Journal of Botany. The etymology of the chosen specific name huashanensis is in recognition of the Huashan Hills, near the type locality, which are noted for an ancient fresco on a cliff.

== Description ==
While the foliage of C. huashanensis is similar in overall appearance to several Cupressaceae genera, the details of the cuticle structure and overall morphology indicate the species is part of the genus Calocedrus. C. huashanensis differs from the living C. formosana by having less obtuse-shaped facial leaves and side leaves that do not incurve. The living North American species C. decurrens differs from C. huashanensis in the slightly flattened morphology of the leafy shoots and the weakly dimorphic leaves. C. huashanensis and the modern C. macrolepis can be separated by the distribution of the stomal zones of the leaves on the undersides of shoots.
