= Ireibaru =

Archaeological site in Okinawa, Japan

- 伊礼原遺跡 (Japanese)
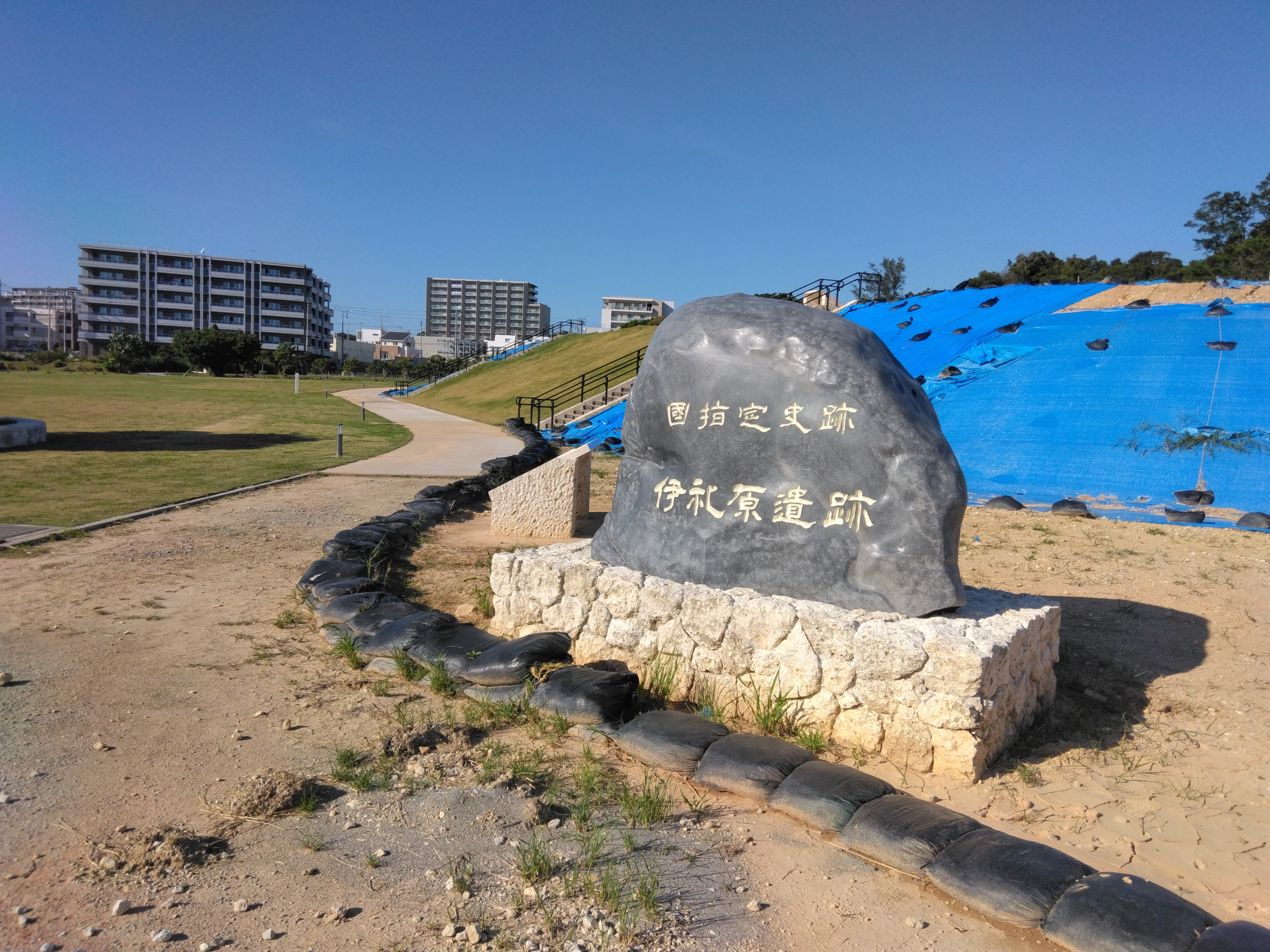
- Sign at the entrance of Ireibaru Site

- Location within Okinawa Prefecture Location within Japan
- Interactive map of Ireibaru
- 26°19′27″N 127°45′31″E
- Type: Settlement
- Periods: Kaizuka period; Gusuku period; Early modern period; Modern period
- Cultures: Early Kaizuka; Late Kaizuka; Gusuku; Ryukyu Kingdom
- Location: Chatan, Okinawa

Site notes
- Elevation: 5 m (16 ft)
- Area: 1.5 ha (3.7 acres)
- Excavation dates: 1995-1997, 1998-2005
- Discovered: 1988
- Owner: public
- Public access: Yes (Now is the site of Chatan Museum)

Designations
- Designation: National Historic Site

Ireibaru (Japanese: 伊礼原遺跡) is a major archaeological site of Okinawa Island, located in town of Chatan on the western coast. It includes occupations for the whole duration of the Kaizuka period, for the Gusuku and Early Kingdom periods, the early modern period and the modern period. It is the only site in Okinawa Prefecture to show occupations for each of the phases of the Kaizuka period. It yielded large quantities of artefacts in perishable materials conserved in wet context. It has been designated as a National Historic Site in 2010. Chatan Museum opened on 20 November 2024 at the location of the site.

== Location ==
Address: Okinawa, Chatan, Ihei1-1 (formerly Ihei, Ireibaru 144 and 163).

Coordinates: 26.324229350734°N 127.75839300427°E

Ireibaru is located in Chatan, a town on the western coast of Okinawa Island. Before the war, this area corresponded to the eastern side of the settlement of Irei, that was destroyed to build Camp Kuwae. It is an alluvial area at the foot of low hills, enclosed by higher plateaus and a river. The plateaus on the back are about 30 m high. A spring named Ūchi-nu-kā is located at the foot of the hill and formed wetlands and a stream that watered the small alluvial plain before it poured into the Nagasa-gā River by its estuary on the western side of the archaeological site.

== Discovery and excavations ==
The area where Ireibaru is located is rich in archaeological sites. In 1988, during construction works along the river, ceramic sherds and bones were disclosed, leading to the intervention of archaeologists from Chatan Town Board of Education. The archaeologists identified the area on the sand dune as an archaeological site and named it Ireibaru A. Since the construction works would not damage it furthermore, it was not immediately excavated. The same year, at the occasion of construction works on a water drainage facility in Camp Kuwae, another site named Ireibaru B was discovered and partly excavated.

In 1996, it was decided by the Special Action Committee on Okinawa that the northern part of Camp Kuwae should be returned to Chatan in March 2003. In the scope of this retrocession, the Japanese Agency for Cultural Affairs and Okinawa Prefecture Board of Education started in 1995 a three-year survey of the buried cultural properties in the concerned 40.5 ha area. It resulted in the disclosure of ten archaeological sites and six artefact scatters. The archaeological sites included the previously mentioned Ireibaru A and B, as well as Ireibaru C in the wetland, and Ireibaru D and E.

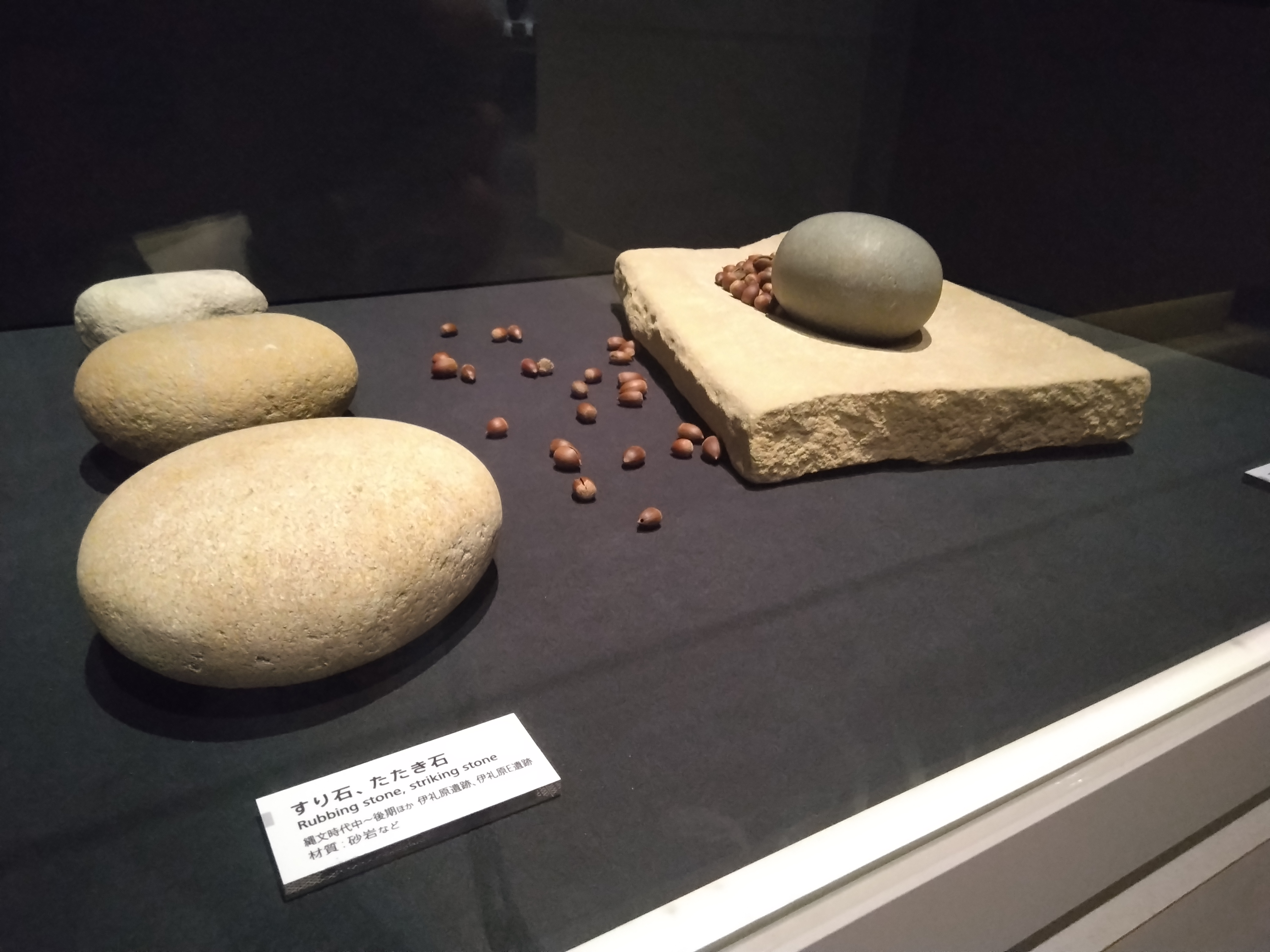
Saddle querns and handstones from Kaizuka Period sites in Chatan

After the archaeological testing in 1996, excavation surveys were implemented between 1998 and 2005. Ireibaru C was excavated between 1998 and 2002, Ireibaru A between 2002 and 2005.
The excavations made it clear that Ireibaru A and Ireibaru C were in fact the same site, and since it appeared to be of utter importance for the Kaizuka period studies, the two sites were merged under the name "Ireibaru Site" in 2006, while Ireibaru B, D and E remained independent entities. Only Ireibaru is registered as a National Historic Site.

== Site description ==
The site measures 15,000 m^{2} and includes a wetland part watered by Ūchi-nu-kā (formerly Ireibaru C) and a sand dune part on the west (formerly Ireibaru A). People lived on the sand dune (settlement remains) but conducted most of their daily activities (food processing) by the stream and the wetland. The site comprises occupations of the Kaizuka period from the Early Kaizuka Period Phase I to the Late Kaizuka Period, of the Gusuku and Early Kingdom period and the remains of the pre-war settlement.

The part of the wetland area by the foot of the hill includes occupations of the Early Kaizuka Period Phase I, Phase II, Phase III and Phase IV. The sand dune was formed later in the chronology and shows occupations as soon as it starts being formed in the Early Kaizuka Period Phase III. It is then continuously occupied with remains of the Early Kaizuka Period Phases IV and V and Late Kaizuka Period Phase I.
During this long period, the sand dune was damaged twice possibly by tidal waves or very strong storms. The first time was during the Early Kaizuka Period Phase IV when a part of the settlement disappeared in the collapse of the dune, and the second time during the Late Kaizuka Period Phase I. After the second collapse of the sand dune, it reconstructed slowly, and the next occupation of the area is dated of the 13th century during the Gusuku Period, when a new settlement was built there.

The site yielded a large quantity of pottery, and especially Sobata pottery of the Early Jōmon Culture of Kyūshū Island, but also lithics, wild boar bones, land turtle bones, fish bones and marine shells. It is particularly famous for the conservation in wet context of perishable material such as seeds, fruits and wood.

== Site chronology ==
=== Early Kaizuka Period Phase I (4800-4000 BCE) ===
The first attested human occupation was found for the Early Kaizuka Period Phase I, when people lived in the area around the spring. Artefacts (Nantō-tsmegatamon pottery and stone tools) were found, but no remain of dwellings could be identified. It is highly probable they used the rock shelters of the nearby limestone hill. This is a period when the sea level was higher than nowadays, and the site was located on the shore.

=== Early Kaizuka Period Phase II (3500-3000 BCE) ===
This is the period of occupation for which the use of the area near the water seems the most intense. Peebles between 5 and 40 cm large deposited on the southwestern side of the site and it is from this pebble layer that the imported Sobata pottery from the Early Jomon culture of Kyūshū Island was found. The layers from this period also yielded stone tools, wooden implements, shells, animal and fish bones, seeds, acorns and nuts. Bamboo baskets were installed on the southeastern side of the site, in the marsh, where the pebbles were scarce, to wash the tannin from the acorns and conserve them underwater. It is thought the dwelling site was located on the sandy area that had formed on the western side of the hill. The sea level was quite similar to the one in the preceding period and the site was still on the shore. The coral reefs started to form.

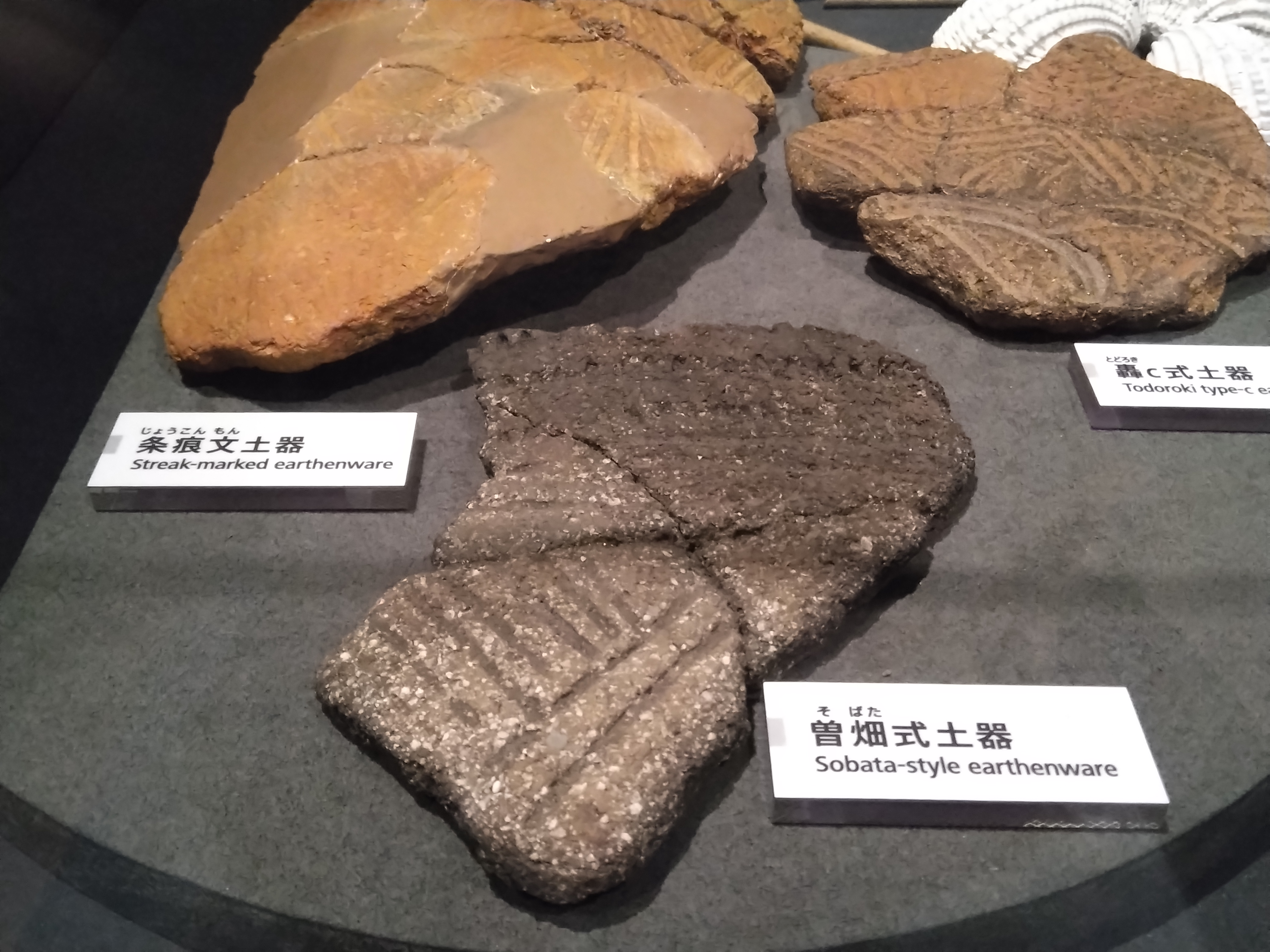
Example of Sobata pottery

The shift toward marine resources, a well-known event in Okinawan prehistory linked to the development of the coral reefs, is observed in Ireibaru as soon as the Early Kaizuka Period Phase II, which is early compared to the general tendency in Okinawa Island, where the move can be seen rather in Phase III. This can be explained by the favourable marine environment by the site, with a protected bay that sheltered numbers of fishes even before the full development of the coral reefs.

=== Early Kaizuka Period Phase III (by 2500 BCE) ===
The wetland occupation for this period was found above the pebbles layer that had filled the southwestern part of the site. It yielded wood fragments cut into planks, stone tools Omonawa-zentei pottery (types III to V), Nakadomari pottery (types A and B) and a wooden container.

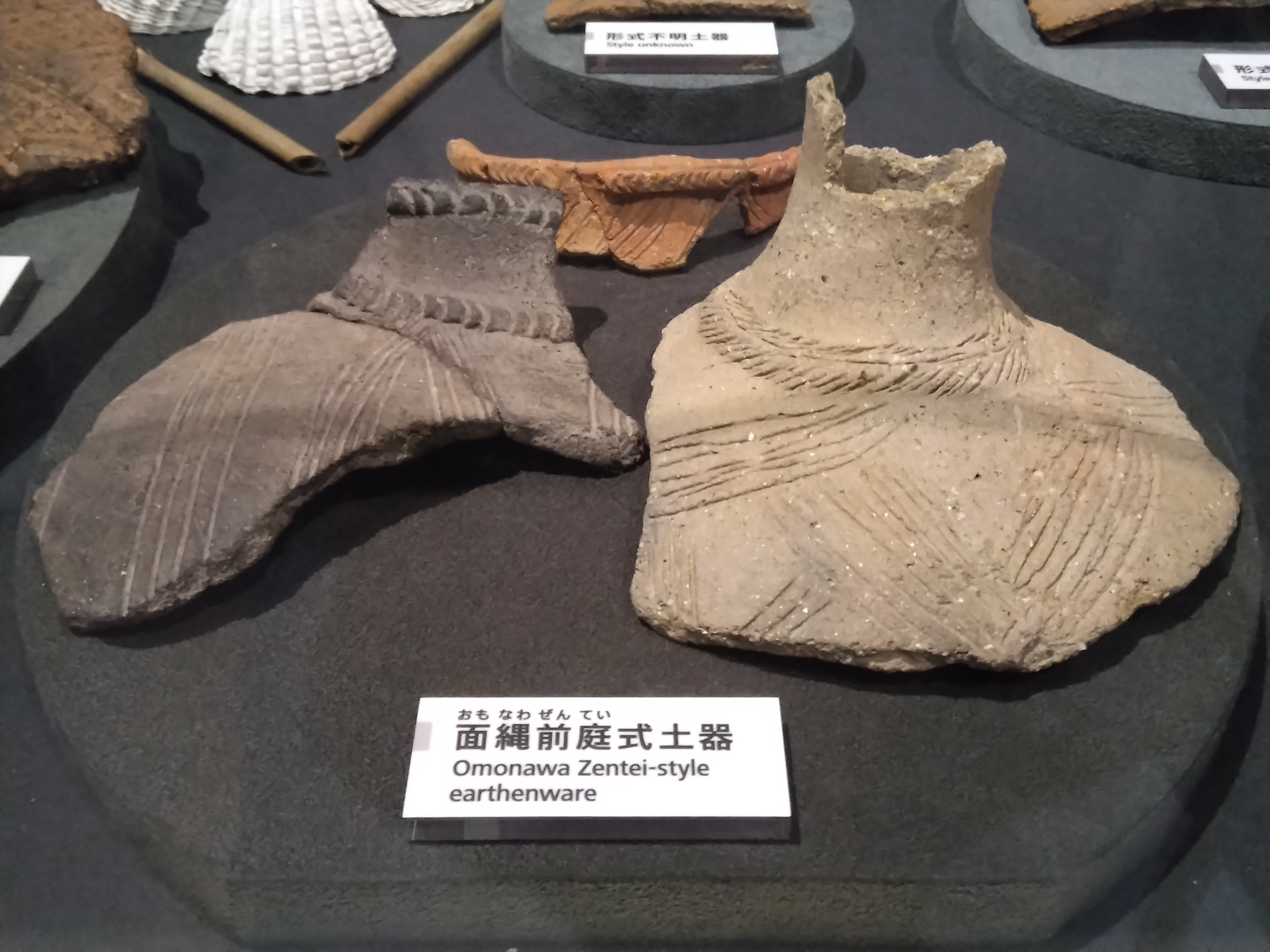
Examples of Omonawa-zentei pottery

Around the foot of the hill by the southwestern and southern side of the wetland, a sand dune started to form, from which three hearths, a concentration of marine shells in a large pit that might have been originally a pit-dwelling, and several postholes were disclosed, showing that the settlement extended westwards. Two fragmentary human bones (a femur and a tibia) were retrieved from the Early Kaizuka Period Phase III contexts. They were isolated but might hint at the presence of a funerary area in the vicinity. The dune also yielded Omonawa-zentei pottery and Nakadomari pottery. Sea and land mammal bones and artefacts made from them, as well as pottery and lithics, have been found in this residential area.

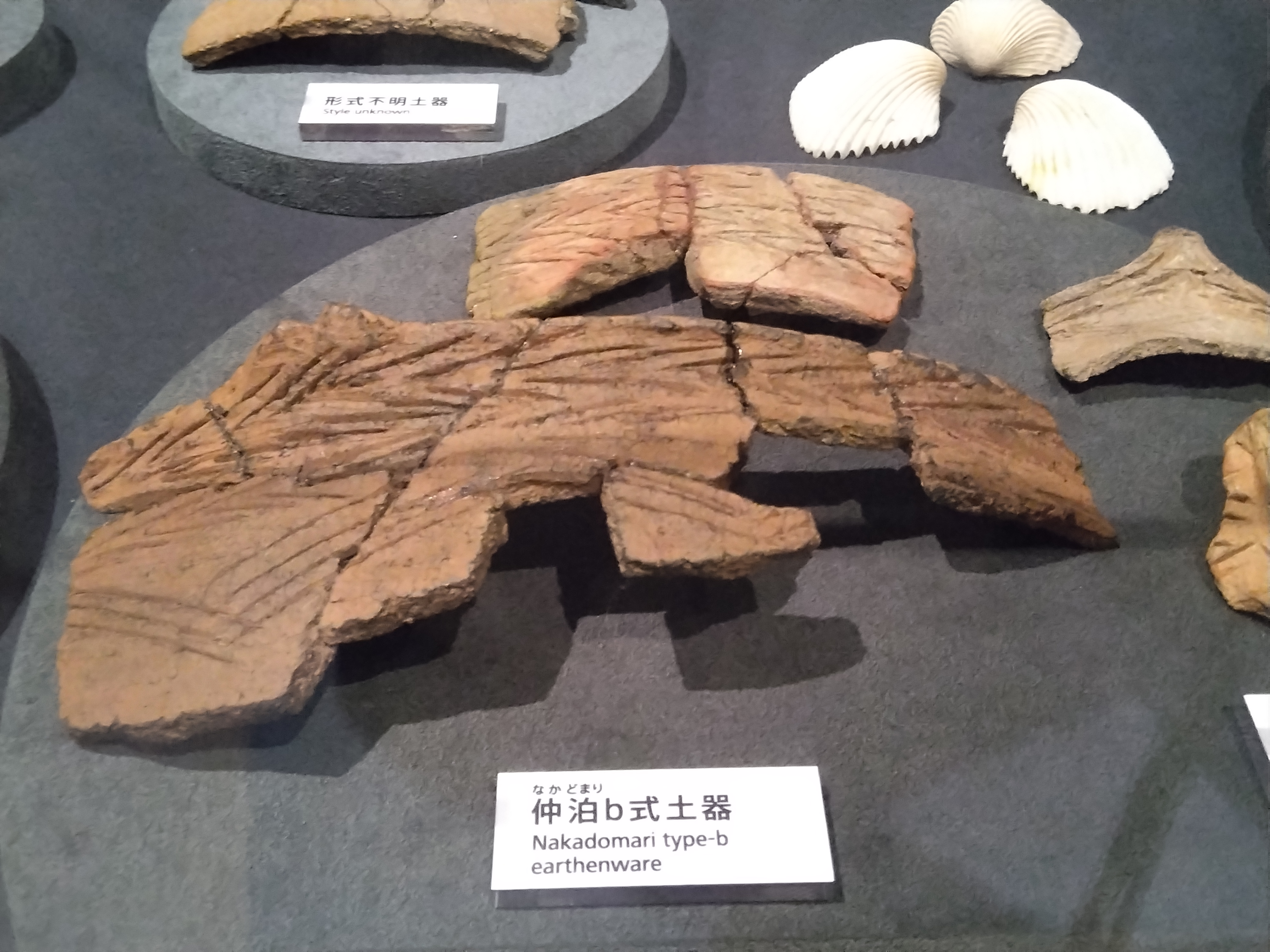
Examples of Nakadomari pottery

The sea level started to decrease and the shore got further. The coral reefs were better developed than during the preceding period.

=== Early Kaizuka Period Phase IV (by 1500 BCE) ===
During this occupation, the population do not use the wetland as much, but the remains are more numerous on the sand dune. The sand dune is spreading slowly westward and two pit-dwellings were found extending southeastward, accompanied by four stone concentration areas and eight earth pits. The dwellings are squared with rounded angles, about 3x3 m large, paved with flat stones. The stone concentrations might be dwellings as well, but they do not show any voluntary excavation of the ground to create a pit-dwelling.

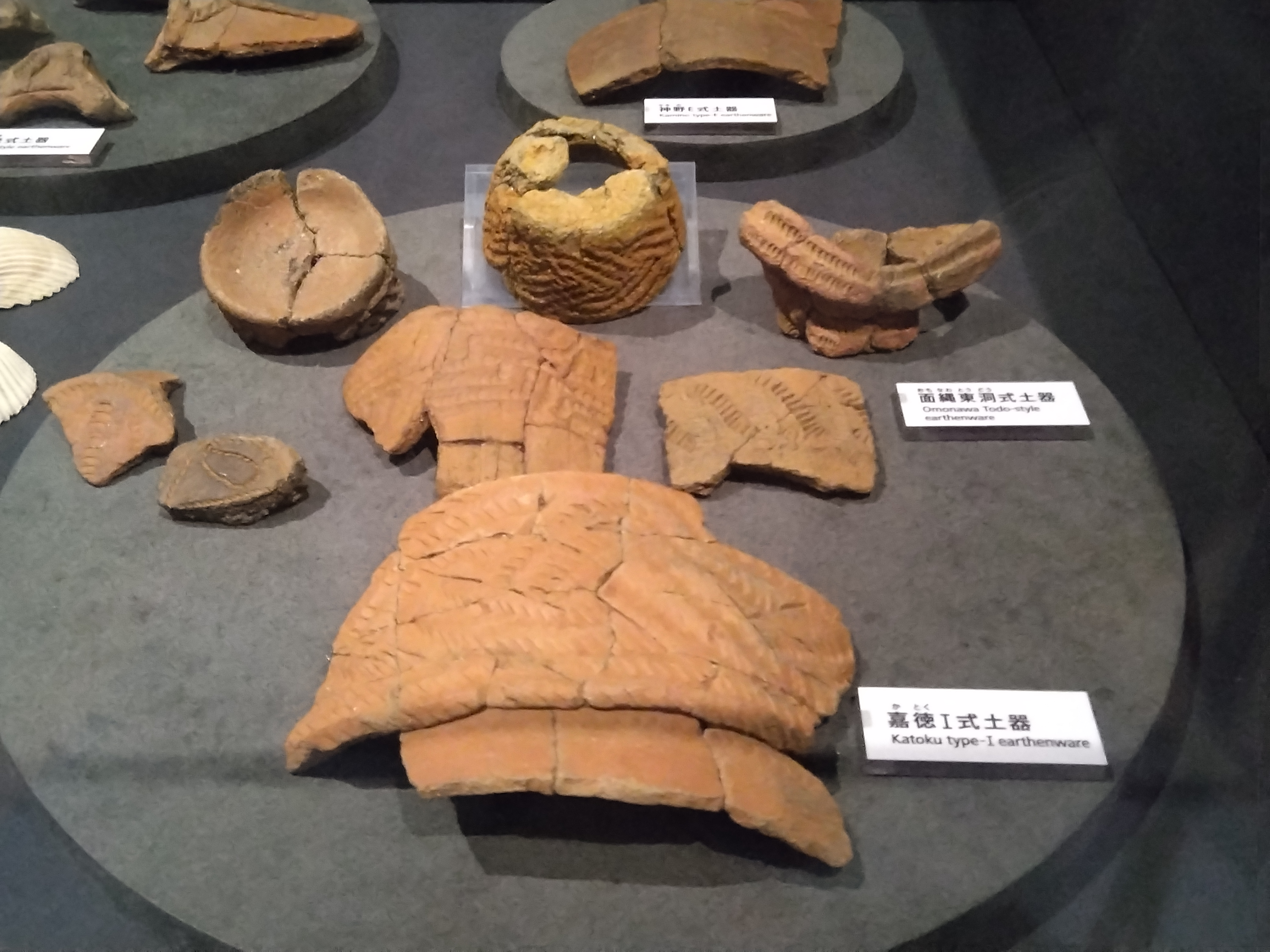
Examples of Katoku and Omonawa-todo potteries

The settlement yielded stone tools such as saddle querns, Omonawa-tōdō pottery, Katoku pottery, Ichiki pottery, Iha-Ogidō pottery and animal and fish bones. It is during this period that the sand dune is damaged for the first time, by a tidal wave or a strong storm, destroying part of the dwellings.

=== Early Kaizuka Period Phase V (by 500 BCE) ===
The use of the wetland seems to decline furthermore, but a wooden comb was found in one of the former water channels of the area. A new sand dune is developing and a settlement is again installed at this location, extending further northward. A hearth lined with stone and an earth pit were disclosed, but no dwelling could be identified. The discovery of isolated human bones (a skull) hints at the presence of a funerary area in the close vicinity.
In addition to the wooden comb, the artefacts include local Kayauchibanta pottery, Uzahama pottery, Nakabaru pottery, obsidian imported from Kyūshū and jade from Itoigawa on Honshū Island, showing that the extent of the trade sphere increases.

=== Late Kaizuka Period Phase I (by the beginning of the Common Era) ===
The use of the wetland is still low, but the use of the sand dunes increases with the development of the dwelling area from which many postholes were disclosed. It was however not possible to attribute the postholes to precise dwellings.
The site yielded sherds of a large jar from the Early Yayoi culture, a flat edge stone axe and conch shells bracelets of the Morioka type, trade goods that had until then never been found in Okinawa, despite the fact they were produced there and exported to Kyūshū Island. It is at this period that the dune is damaged again by a tidal wave or a strong storm, in which the settlement is partly destroyed.

=== Gusuku and Early Kingdom periods (1200-1500 CE) ===
A mangrove forest developed in the wetland before the beginning of the Gusuku period (directly dated of 1140 ±60 CE). It was followed chronologically by thick deposits (1 m) that included a lot of fresh water snails and were interpreted as earth from fields and paddy fields, extending from the Gusuku period to WWII. It was the first time on Okinawa that remains of antique paddy fields were the object of an archaeological survey.
During the Gusuku period, a new sand dune got formed, on which a new settlement was built. It extended this time northwestward and is considered as the foundation of the Irei settlement that perdured until the war. The Gusuku period settlement was characterised by the discovery of a large number of postholes from the houses and the granaries. It was however not possible to attribute the postholes to precise dwellings. The wooden posts were conserved in two of the postholes.
The Gusuku and Early Kingdom periods can be divided into three stages with imported talc pots, kamuiyaki ware and Chinese white porcelain for Stage I (11-13th c.), celadon for Stage II (13-15th c.) and blue-and-white porcelain, celadon and sancai porcelain for Stage III (15-16th c.), showing a slow shift in the maritime trade routes. Those imported artefacts are accompanied by locally produced Gusuku pottery. Most of the Chinese porcelain associated with the postholes area is dated of the 15th to 16th century. The older artefacts were retrieved from a part of the site with no archaeological structures.

=== Early Modern and Modern periods (17th c.-1940) ===
The wet land was used for paddy fields and the spring was the sacred ubu-gā (new born well, the spring from which the water for childbirth and the first bath of the newborn was drawn) of Irei Village. The sand dune had further extended and the settlement had shifted westward compared to its first location in the Gusuku period. Before the war, the area included two settlements, the main village of Irei (21 households) and Īma Yādui (18 households), a newly founded settlement peopled by families from Shuri. Some of the fukugi trees that formed protective fences around the residences are still visible nowadays.
The artefacts collected from the sand dune show no interruption of occupation from the Gusuku to the Modern period. After the aforementioned Stage III, the ceramic assemblage is then dominated by Okinawan stoneware (starting in the 17th c.) before Japanese porcelain increases between the Japanese annexation and WWII.

== Notable artifacts and ecofacts ==
=== Pottery ===
The site yielded a large quantity of pottery sherds for all the periods. The oldest pottery retrieved was dated of 4800 BCE while the most recent one dated of 1200 CE. It included examples from the types Nantō-tsumegatamon (Early Kaizuka Phase I), Sobata, Murokawa-kasō (Phase II), Omonawa-zentei, Nakadomari (Phase III), Omonawa-tōdō, Katoku I and II, Ichiki, Iha, Ogidō (Phase IV), Kayauchibanta, Uzahama, Nakabaru (Phase V), as well as pottery from the Late Kaizuka Period Phase I and the Gusuku period.
Although pottery is commonly found in Kaizuka period sites, some of the examples retrieved from Ireibaru are noteworthy.

==== Early Kaizuka Phase I ====
The wetland area yielded Nantō-tsumegatamon pottery (155 sherds) of the Yabuchi and Agaribaru types, from the Early Kaizuka Period Phase I, adorned with finger nail prints and/or finger prints. Nantō-tsumegatamon was long considered the oldest pottery of Okinawa Island, until recent discoveries of older types.

==== Early Kaizuka Phase II ====
The wetland occupation of the Early Kaizuka Period Phase II yielded Sobata pottery. It is, in quantity, the most important type of pottery found in Ireibaru (2250 sherds). Although the style is originally from Kyūshū, it spread in the locally produced pottery as well and the tempering of the sherds found in Ireibaru shows that most of the pots were locally produced. Although several sites of the Kaizuka period have yielded sherds of imported or locally produced Sobata pottery, it remains rare enough.
One sherd had a tempering made of talc powder, that is distinctive of the Sobata pottery produced on Kyūshū Island, showing the scope of the communication network of the time. Several other sherds have characteristics that are closer to the Kyūshū Sobata than the Okinawan one, so that they might be imported as well. They include andesite in their tempering and might have come from a volcanic island, possibly in the Tokara. Those sherds represent about 20% of all sherds retrieved.

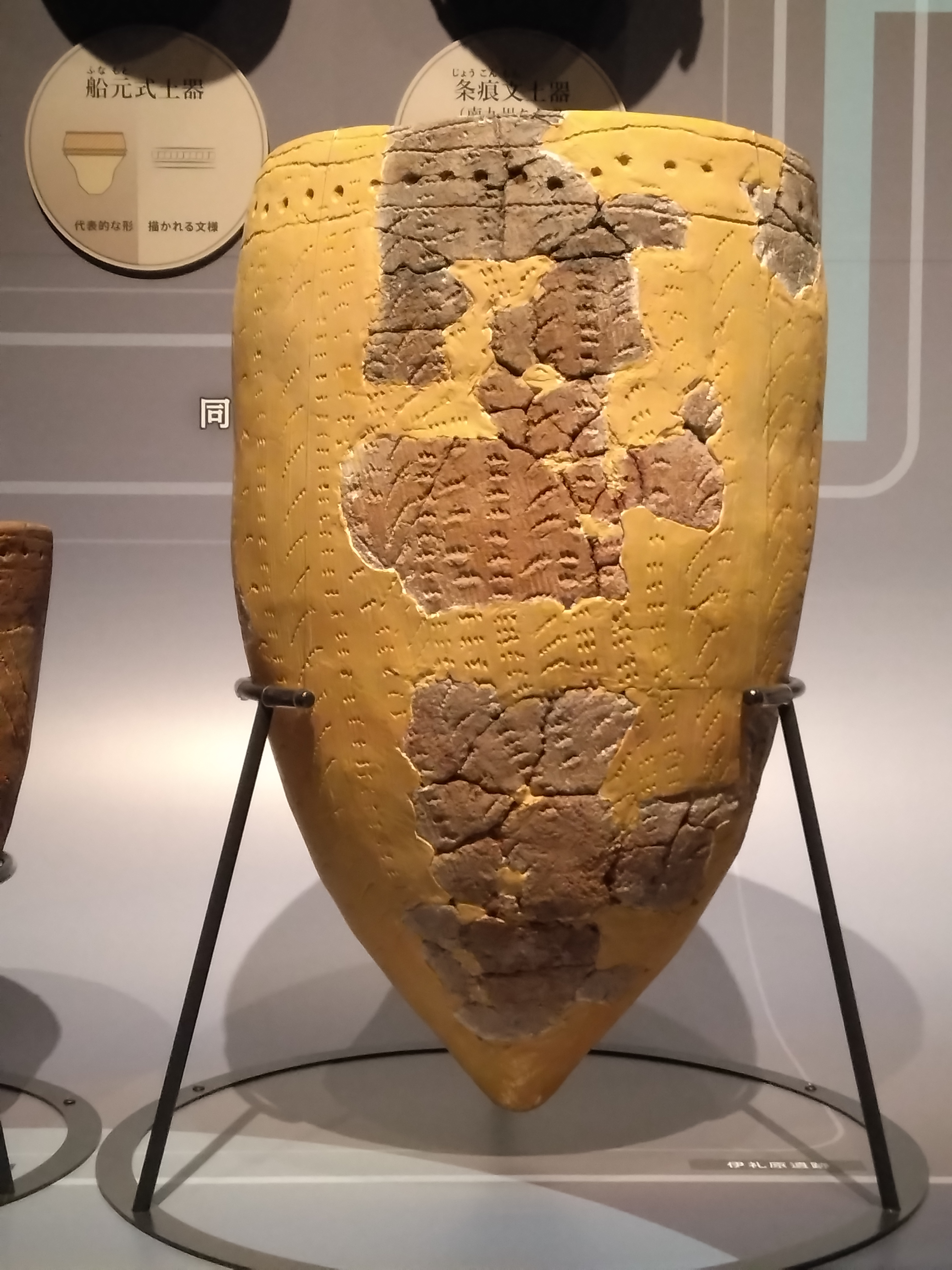
55 cm high Murokawa-kaso pot from Ireibaru Site

Sherds of the Murokawa-kasō type retrieved from the same Phase II contexts on the sand dune permitted to reconstruct a pot 55 cm high, which made it the tallest pot of the Kaizuka period found in Okinawa.

=== Lithics ===
Although mainly local stones were used to make the stone tools, there were also andesite and basalt from Kume Island and the Kerama Islands, and chert from Izena and Ie Islands, as well as obsidian imported from Kyūshū Island and jade from Itoigawa on Honshū Island. Chert was particularly dominant. Incidentally, the site also yielded 44 kg of pumice stones, that were probably naturally deposited on what was then the coast.

A great variety of stone tools were retrieved from the site both from the wetland and the sand dune, including stone axes (317), projectile points (5), blades (9, reuse of broken axes), stone balls (6) saddle querns (41) and handstones (43), anvils (33) and hammers (261), and a scrapper. Most tools predating 1500 BC are simply flaked, while after this date (during the Early Kaizuka Period Phase IV) the number of ground lithic tools increase.

Stone axes are present as soon as the Early Kaizuka Period Phase I.
The saddle querns and handstones are particularly numerous on the sand dune part.

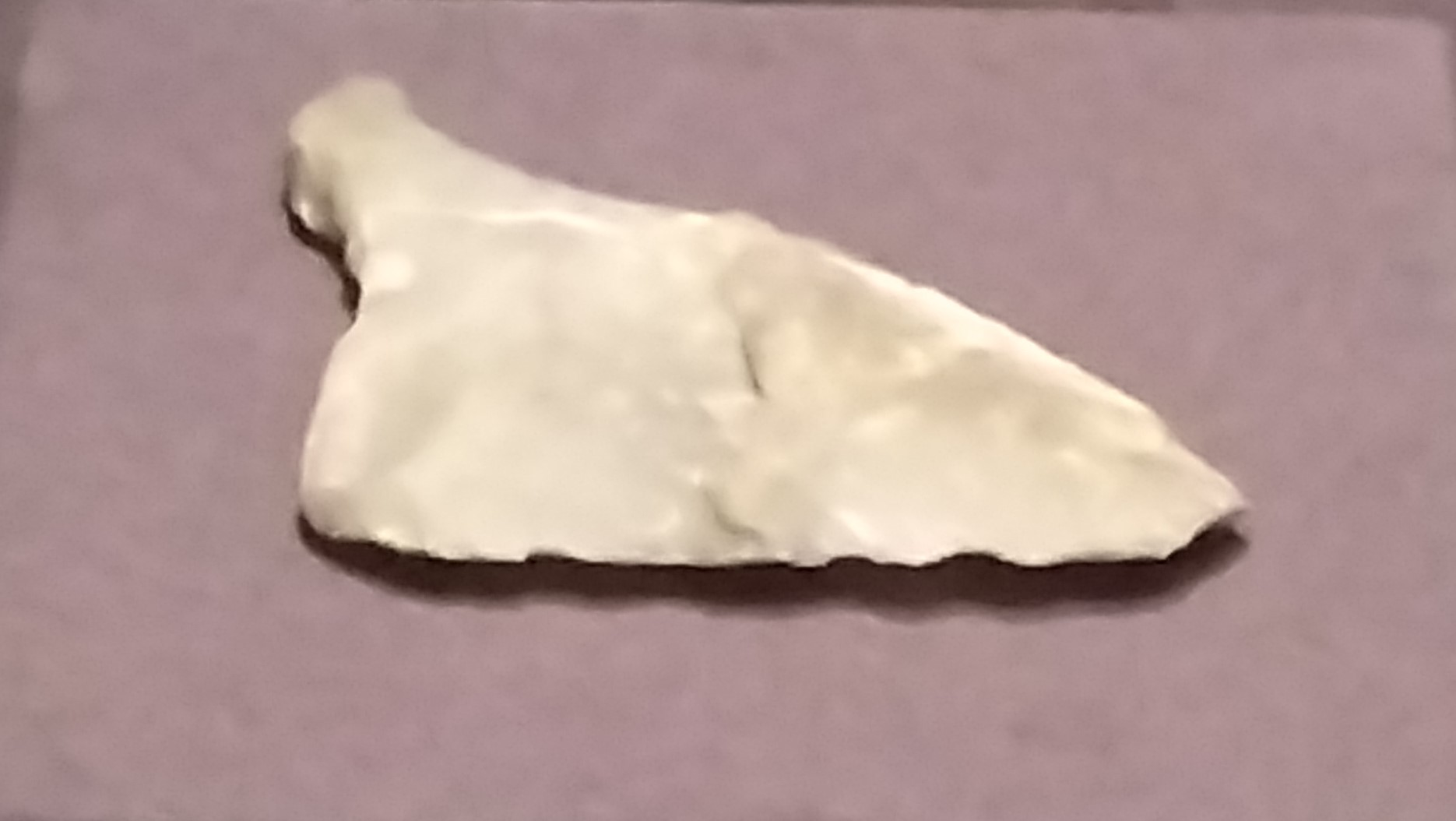
Kaizuka period chert scrapper from Ireibaru Site

The chert scrapper found in Ireibaru was at the time the first one ever found on Okinawa Island. It is dated of the Early Kaizuka Period Phase II. It is a lateral scrapper 5.5 cm high and 6 cm long, weighting only 30 g.

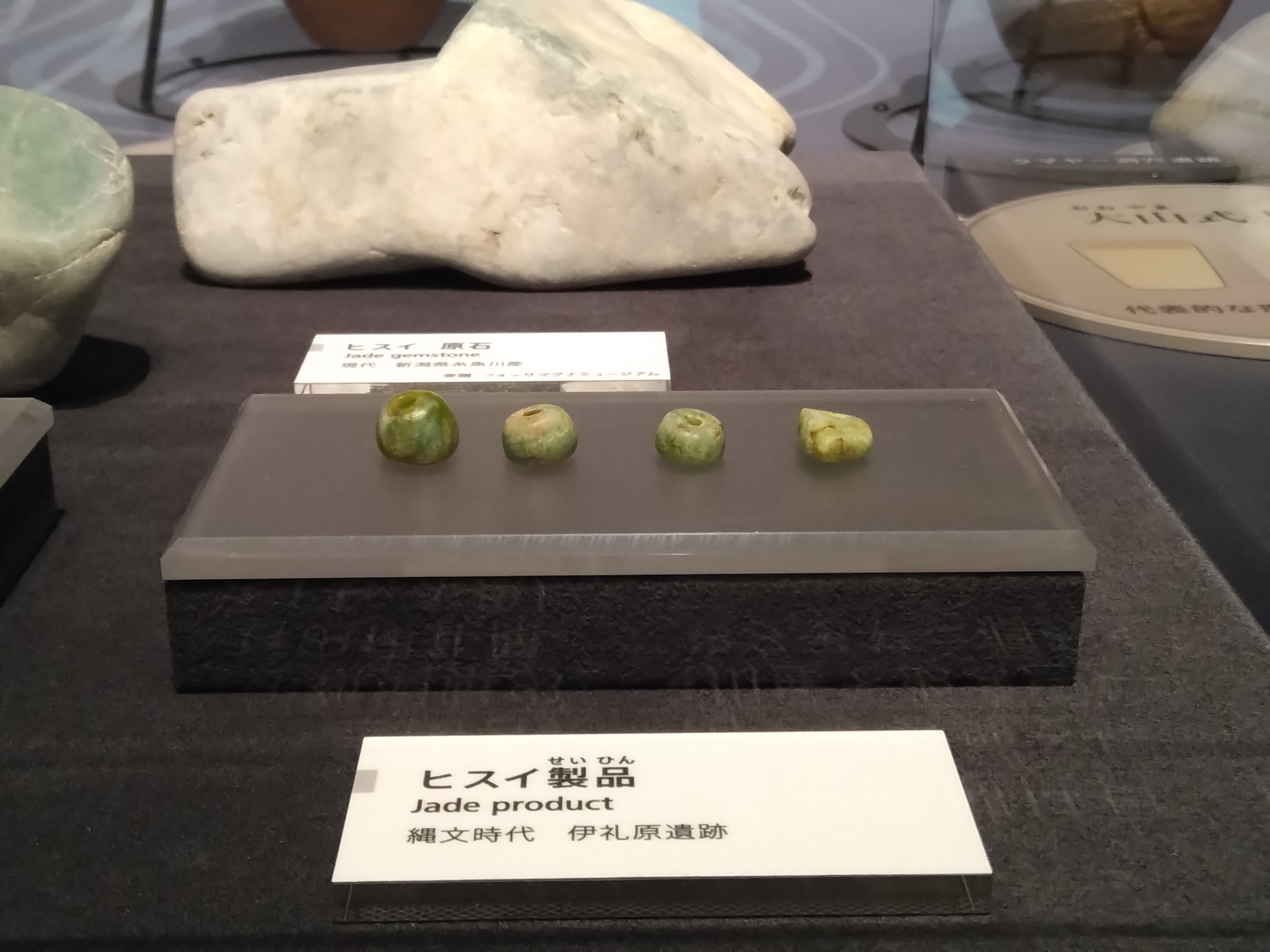
Four jade beads from the Kaizuka Period found in Ireibaru Site

Ireibaru yielded four jade beads, from the Early Kaizuka Period Phase V contexts on the sand dune. The source for the stone, Itoigawa, is located more than 1600 km away on the island of Honshū. Although the holes in jade beads are generally pierced from both sides, the holes in the Ireibaru beads were pierced from only one side through the bead.

=== Organic materials ===
The wet land area yielded a large quantity of materials that are not generally conserved, such as seeds, fruits and wood.

==== Early Kaizuka Phase I ====
The oldest deposits in the wet contexts have yielded wood remains belonging to seventy-six different types of trees, both decidual and perennial, showing that the climate was cooler during the Early Kaizuka Period Phase I.

==== Early Kaizuka Phase II ====
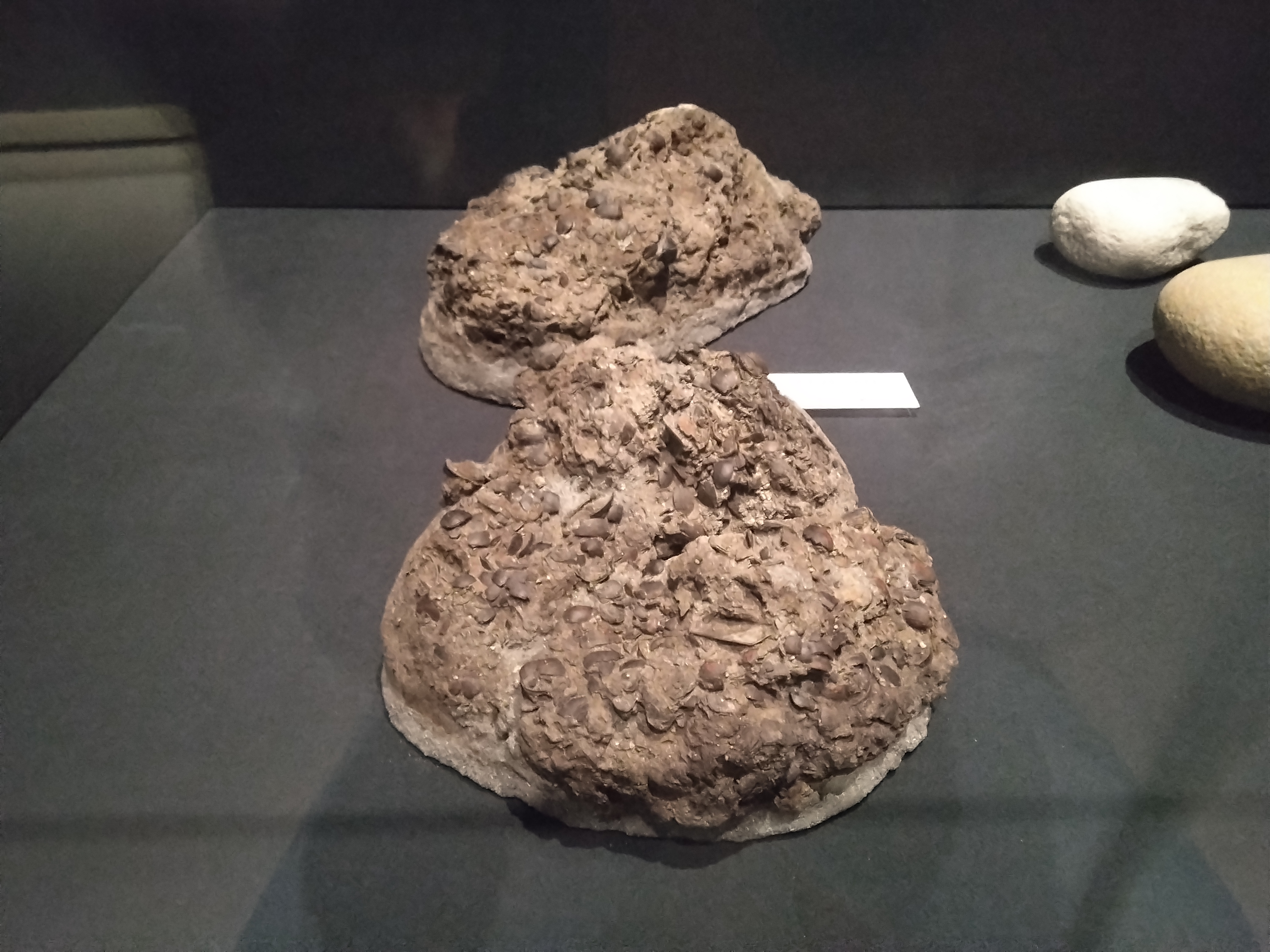
Kaizuka period acorns collected from the wet contexts of Ireibaru Site

The site during the Early Kaizuka Period Phase II was located by the spring and subsequent stream. Thirty-five different types of seeds and fruits (mostly itajii nuts and Okinawan oak acorns) were retrieved from this area, in addition to the stone tools to process them (saddle querns and handstones). Itajii nuts from this layer were directly dated of 5020 ±40 yBP.
Many pieces of wood showing anthropic modification give an insight of the wood working techniques of the time. They are currently the oldest wooden artefacts found in Okinawa Prefecture.

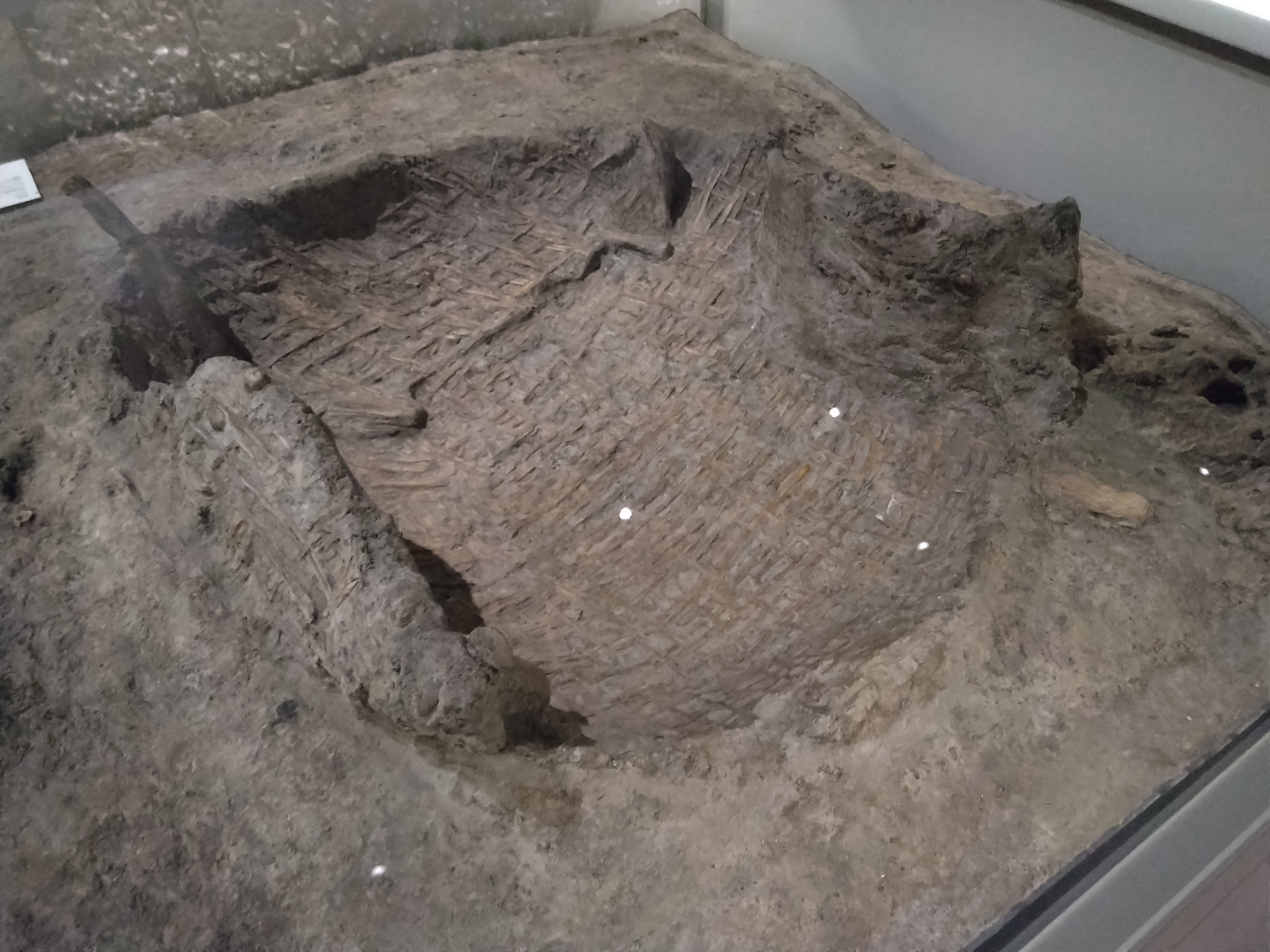
Kaizuka period bamboo basket found in the wet contexts of Ireibaru Site

Important discoveries for this period include a bamboo basket containing Okinawa oak (Quercus miyagii) acorns that had been fixed in the water bed by wood stakes planted at three of its four corners, for underwater storage, and the wooden handle of a stone axe.
The bamboo basket is 90 cm wide at the opening, squared with rounded angles. It is made of 7 mm wide strips of Ryūkyū bamboo (Pleioblastus linearis) assembled with a simple twining technique. It is about 18 to 20 cm deep and the bottom measures 40 x 50 cm. It is currently the oldest bamboo basket found in Okinawa Prefecture. Other examples exist from the site of Mēbaru in Ginoza (Early Kaizuka Period Phase III/IV, twenty-four baskets).

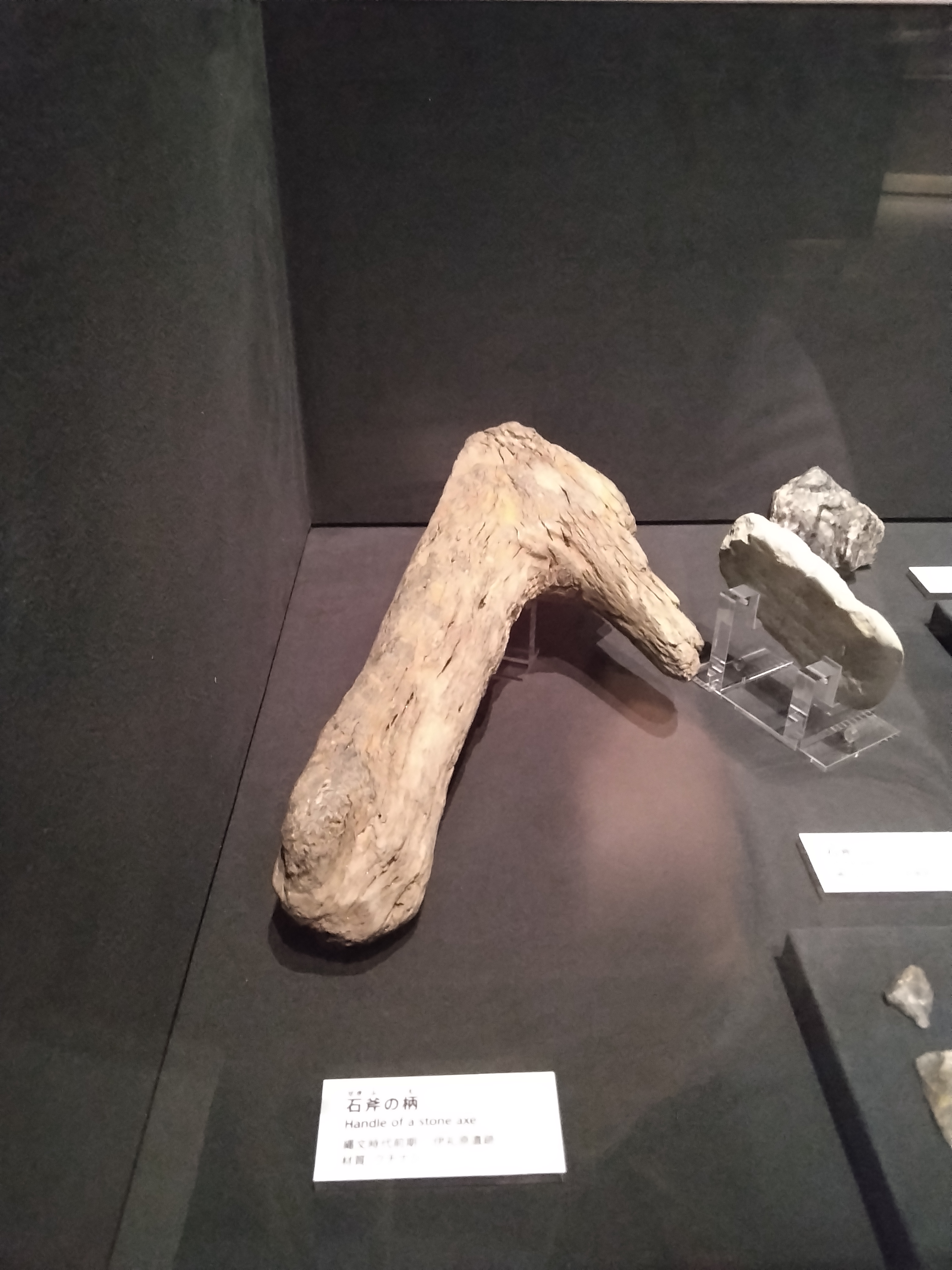
Kaizuka period wooden handle for a stone tool found in wet context in Ireibaru Site

The axe handle is made of gardenia wood (Gardenia jasminoides). It is 32.5 cm long and was used with the axe head shafted horizontally. It makes use of the natural angle between branches to create an angular handle. It is unfinished. It was the first time a wooden tool handle was retrieved from a Kaizuka Period site.

==== Early Kaizuka Phase III ====
The Early Kaizuka Period Phase III occupation yielded a very large wooden container. It is made of incense cedar wood (Calocedrus formosana) that cannot be found in Okinawa, but is present in Southern China and Taiwan. The container is monoxyle, 27 cm wide, 63 cm long and 32 cm high, navicular with a rectangular opening and a flat bottom. It was directly dated of 4460 ±30 y.BP. Marks show it was made with a 3 to 4 cm wide stone axe.

==== Early Kaizuka Phase V ====
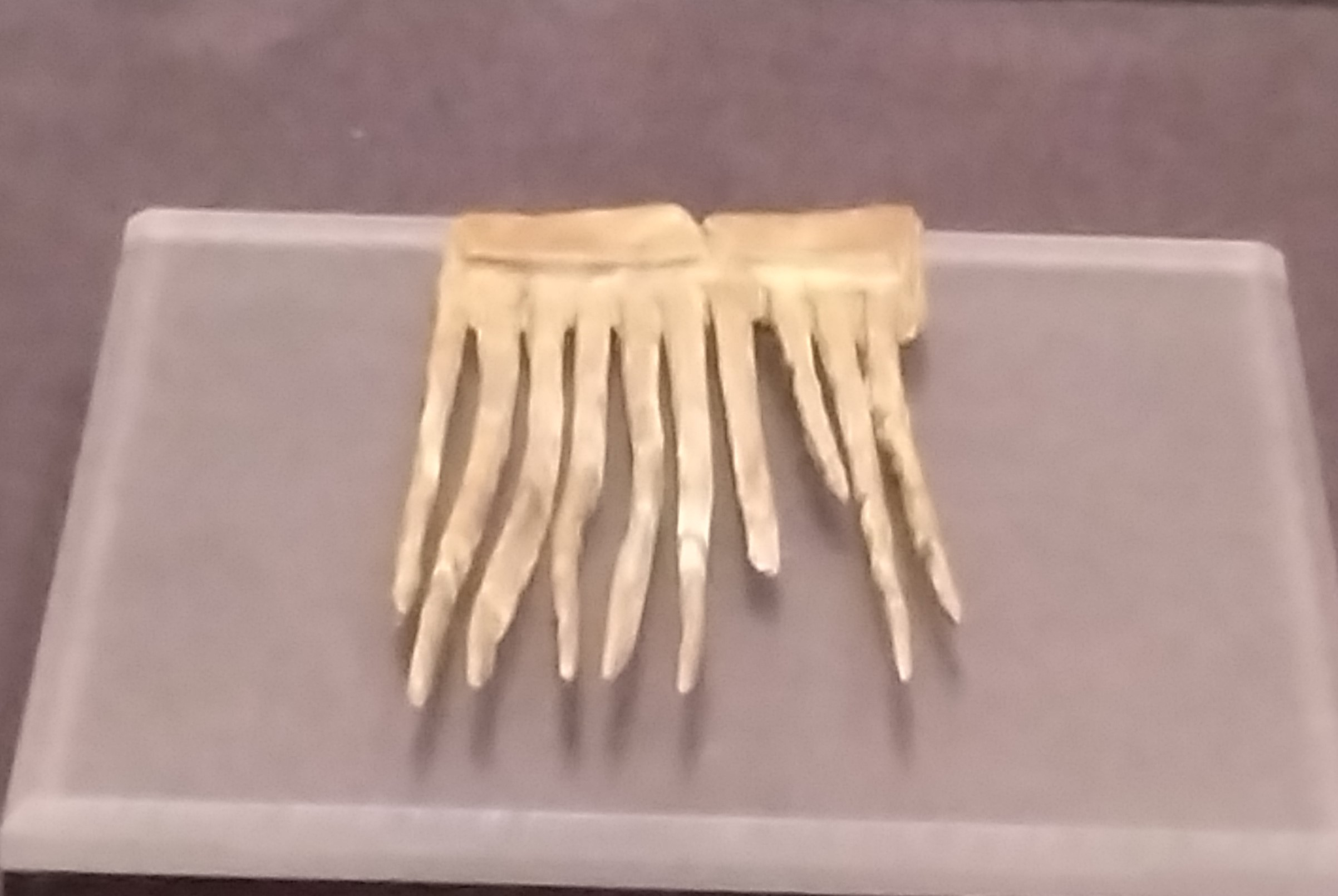
Kaizuka period wooden comb found in the wet contexts of Ireibaru Site

The Early Kaizuka Period Phase V occupation yielded a wooden comb, found at the bottom of a ditch. It is made in black ebony (Diospyros ferrea). It is 1 cm thick, 4.4 cm wide and 8 cm long, the teeth are 6 cm long. The ten teeth are well conserved, six of them being complete after restoration. They are between 0.25 and 0.3 cm wide at the base. It did not display any sign of having been lacquered. It was dated of 2580 ±60 yBP. It was the first time a wooden comb was retrieved from a Kaizuka Period site.

=== Bones and shells ===
Animal bones include wild boars, fishes, dugongs and whales, with wild boar being the most represented in the oldest contexts. Some of the wild boar bones were burnt.
Fish bones include coral reef fishes such as parrotfishes (Scaridae) and wrasses (Labridae). The size of the bones show that large fishes were preferred.
Shellfishes include clams (Tegillarca granosa) and telescope snails (Telescopium telescopium) found in mangroves and top shells (Rochia nilotica) and turban shells (Turbo argyrostomus) from the coral reefs. More than three hundred species are represented.

Tools, such as drills, needles, harpoon heads and hooks made from wild boar and dugong bones were also found, with a large time scope, from the Early Kaizuka Period Phase II to V.

Shells and bones were also used to create personal ornaments: mainly beads, pendants and bracelets.

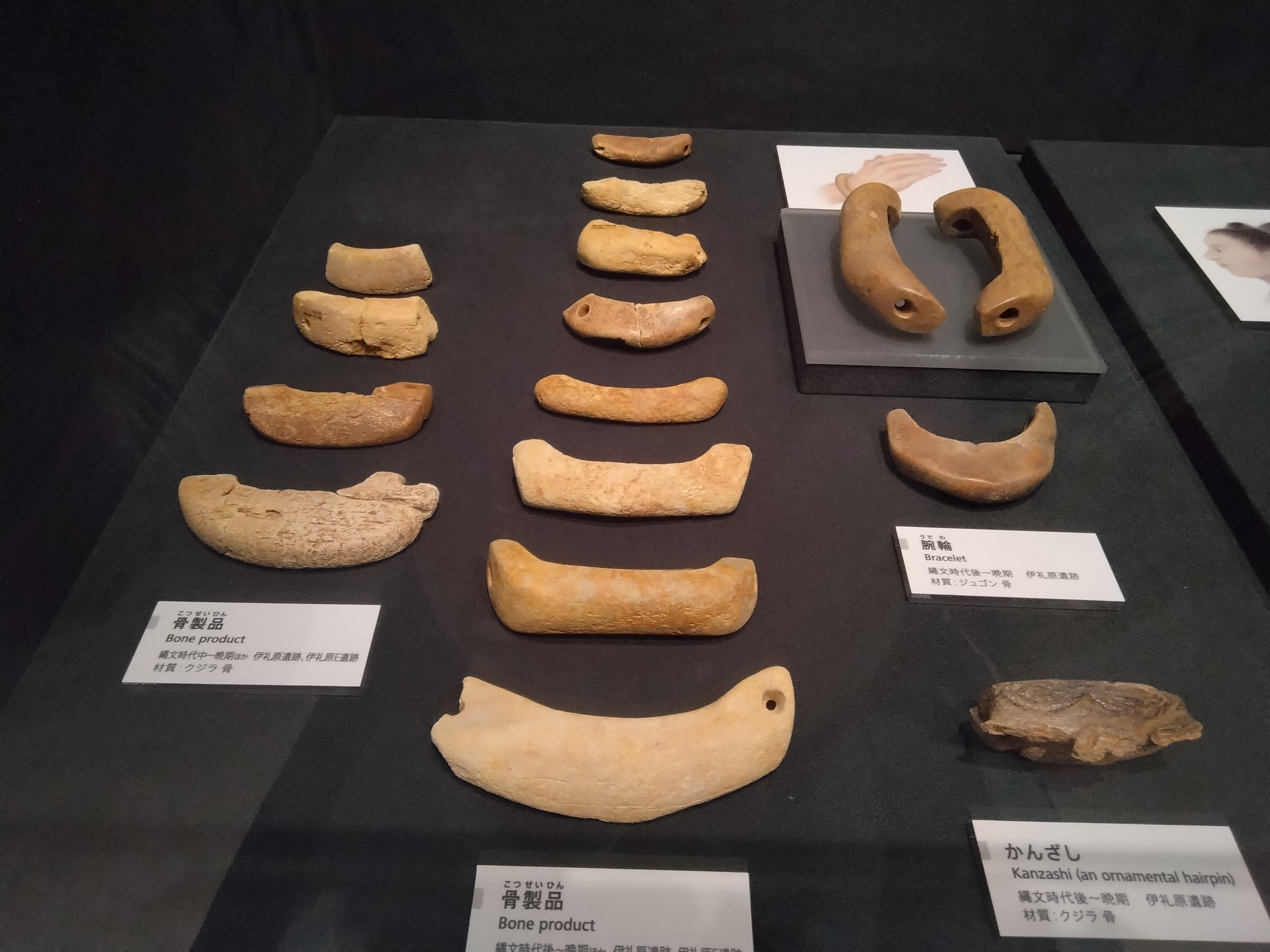
Kaizuka period composite bracelets and hairpins made of animal bones fround in Ireibaru Site

During the Early Kaizuka Period Phases III and IV, pendants were made from spider conchs (Lambis lambis), tiger cowries (Cypraea tigris) or cone snails (Conidae). During Late Kaizuka Period Phase I, shell bracelets made of conchs (Sinustrombus latissimus) became prevalent and the site yielded a cache of unprocessed conchs and cone snails, probably to be used in trade with the populations from the Yayoi Culture of the north of Kyūshū Island, where such bracelets were widely popular. The site also yielded composite bracelets made of wild boar tusks or dugong bones, as well as a possible hair ornament made of incised whale bone.

== Posterity ==
Most of the notable artefacts are exposed at Chatan Museum. The museum includes a large park set at the location of the archaeological site, and offers reconstitutions of the dwellings and of the palaeoenvironment.

== Archaeological sites in the vicinity ==
The coastal area of Chatan is rich in archaeological sites.
The testing survey performed at the retrocession of a part of Camp Kuwae identified several other sites at immediate proximity:

- Ireibaru B (Kaizuka, Gusuku, Early Modern)
- Ireibaru D (Gusuku)
- Ireibaru E (Kaizuka, Gusuku, Early Modern)
- Kushikanikubaru (Gusuku)
- Senbaru (Gusuku, Early Modern)
- Hanzanbaru A (Kaizuka, Gusuku, Early Modern, Modern)
- Hanzanbaru B (Late Kaizuka and Gusuku)
- Hanzanbaru C (Late Kaizuka, Gusuku, Early Modern)

== See also ==
- List of Historic Sites of Japan (Okinawa)
