= Chatan Museum =

Museum in Chatan, Okinawa, Japan

Chatan Museum 北谷町立博物館
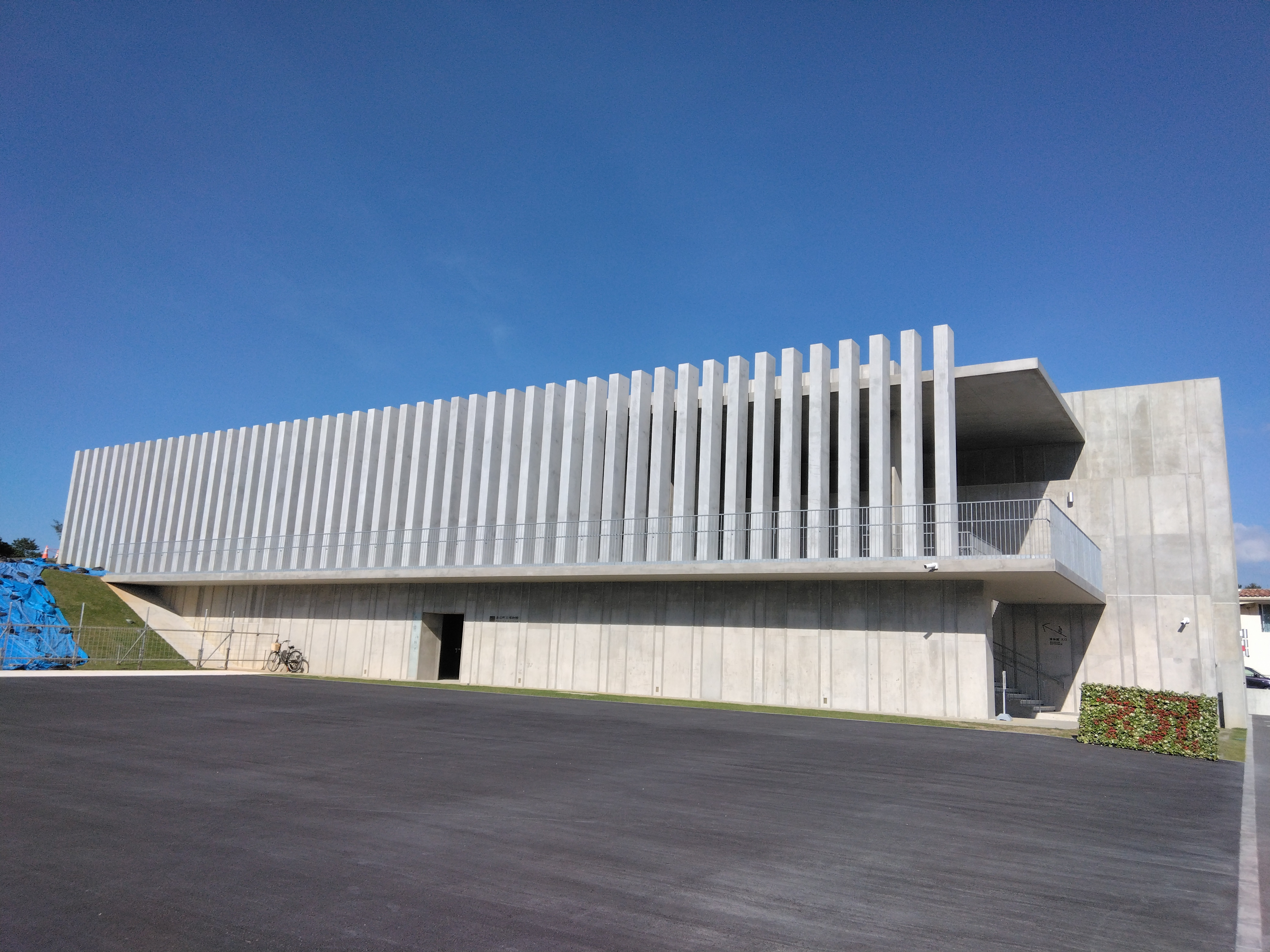
- Interactive map of the Chatan Museum 北谷町立博物館 area

General information
- Location: 1-1-1 Ihei, Chatan, Okinawa Prefecture, Japan
- Coordinates: 26°19′25″N 127°45′33″E
- Opened: 20 November 2024

Website
- museum.chatan.jp (ja)

Chatan Museum (北谷町立博物館, Chatan Chōritsu Hakubutsukan) opened in Chatan, Okinawa Prefecture, Japan, in 2024. Adjacent to Ireibaru Site, the museum displays artefacts from the archaeological site and other items relating to the town's natural history, history, culture, and folklore.

== See also ==
- Chatan Castle
