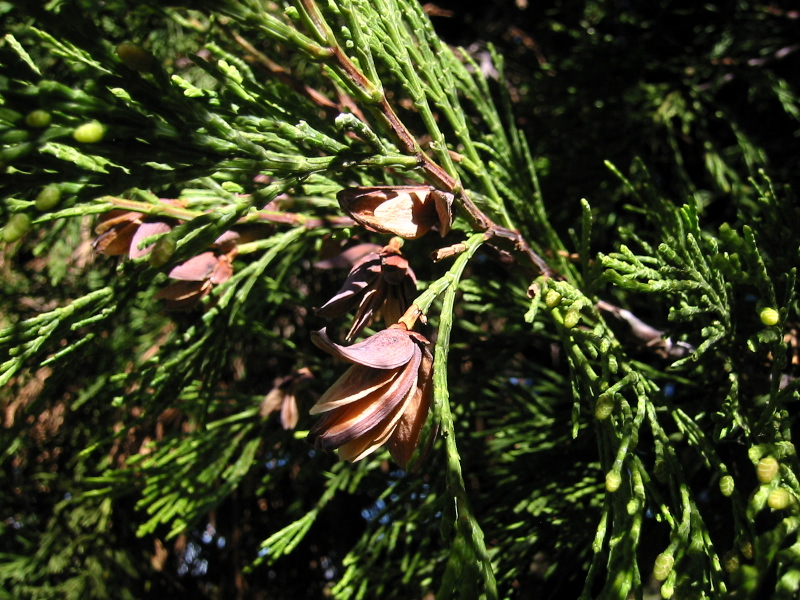
- Calocedrus decurrens California incense cedar

Scientific classification
- Kingdom: Plantae
- Clade: Embryophytes
- Clade: Tracheophytes
- Clade: Gymnosperms
- Division: Pinophyta
- Class: Pinopsida
- Order: Cupressales
- Family: Cupressaceae
- Subfamily: Cupressoideae
- Genus: Calocedrus; Kurz

Type species
- Calocedrus macrolepis Kurz

Synonyms
- Heyderia K.Koch 1873 non Link 1833

= Calocedrus =

Incense-cedar

Genus of conifer trees

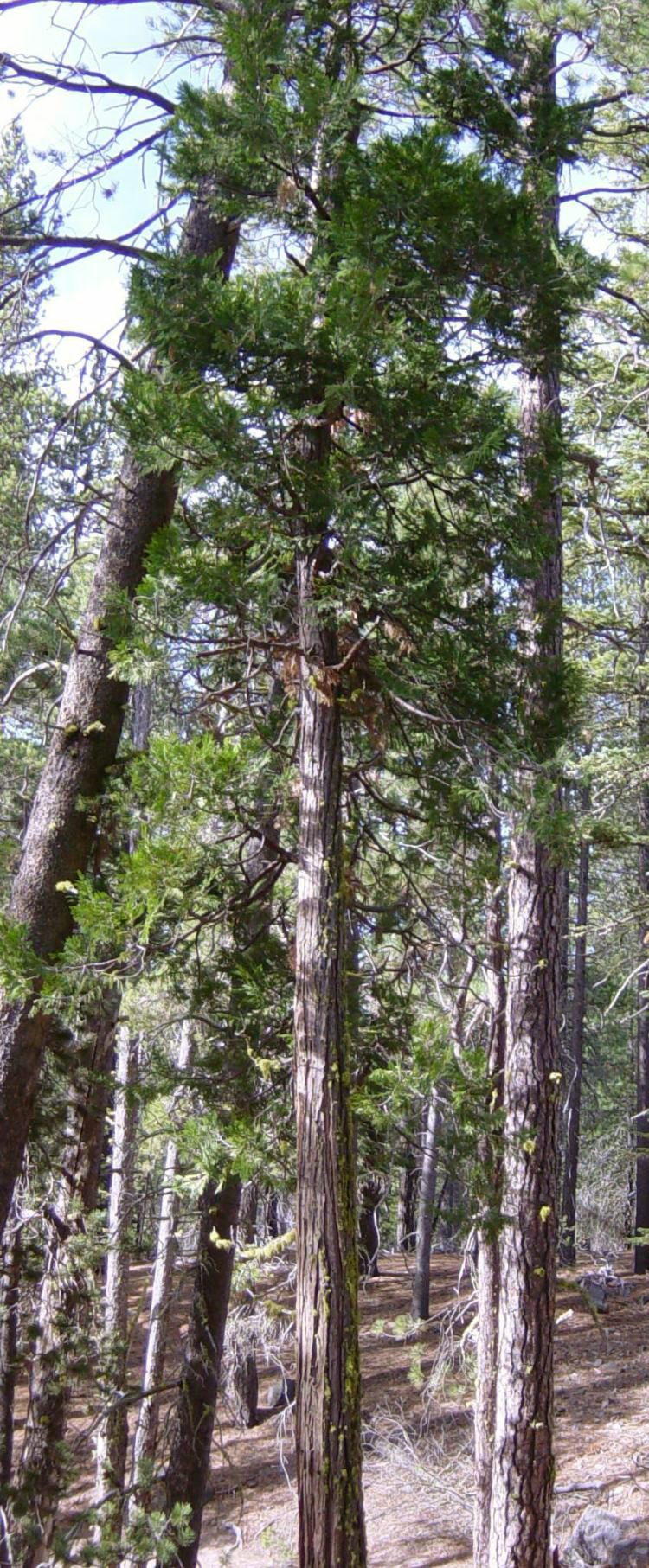
California incense cedar, in Lassen Volcanic National Park

Calocedrus, the incense cedar (alternatively spelled incense-cedar), is a genus of coniferous trees in the cypress family, Cupressaceae, first described as a genus in 1873. Three species are native to eastern Asia and one to western North America.

== Description ==
The genus is related to Thuja, and has similar overlapping scale-leaves. Calocedrus differs from Thuja in the scale leaves being in apparent whorls of four (actually opposite decussate pairs like Thuja, but not evenly spaced apart as in Thuja, instead with the successive pairs closely then distantly spaced), and in the cones having just 2–3 pairs of moderately thin, erect scales, rather than 4–6 pairs of very thin scales in Thuja.

== Taxonomy ==
The generic name Calocedrus means "beautiful cedar".

Cladogram showing the evolutionary relationships:

Stull et al. 2021

- Calocedrus
  - C. decurrens (Torrey) Florin
  - - C. macrolepis Kurz
    - - C. formosana (Florin) Florin
      - C. rupestris Aver., Nguyên & Lôc

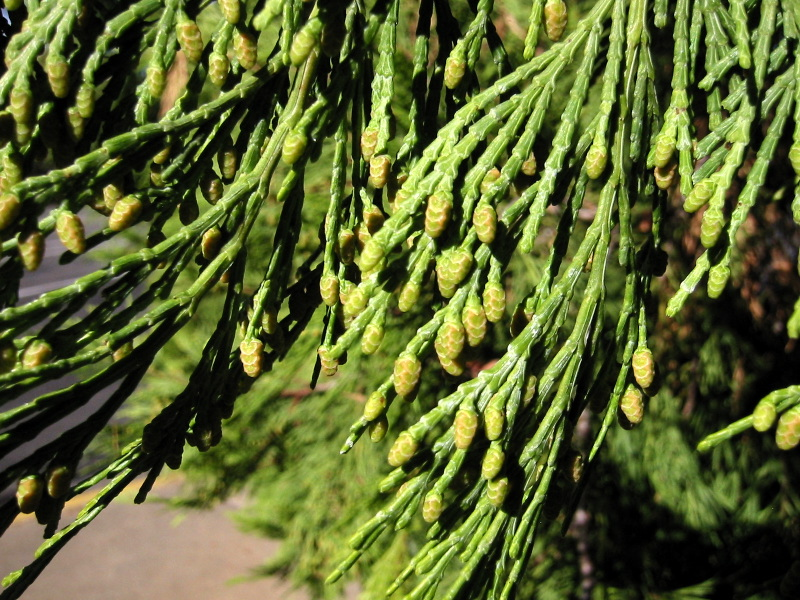
C. decurrens foliage and male cones

== Species ==
=== Extant species ===
Image	Name	Description	Distribution
	Calocedrus decurrens, California incense cedar (syn. Libocedrus decurrens)	It is a large tree, typically reaching heights of 40–60 m and a trunk diameter of up to 3 m (maxima, 69 m tall and 3.9 m diameter), and with a broad conic crown of spreading branches. The leaves are bright green on both sides of the shoots, and the cones 2–2.5 cm long. It is by far the most widely known species in the genus, and is often simply called "incense cedar" without the regional qualifier.	western North America
	Calocedrus formosana, Taiwan incense cedar	It is very similar to C. macrolepis, and some botanists treat it as a variety of that, C. macrolepis var. formosana. It is a medium-sized tree, growing to 25–30 m tall, and is rare in the wild, occurring only as scattered trees in mixed forests. The leaves are glaucous green on the upper side of the shoots, and conspicuously marked with bright white stomatal patches on the underside. The cones are 1.5–2 cm long, carried on a 1–1.5 cm stem.	Taiwan
	Calocedrus macrolepis, Chinese incense cedar	It is also a medium-size tree to 25–30 m tall, and like C. formosana, is rare in the wild. The leaves and cones are similar to C. formosana, differing most obviously in the shorter cone stem, only 0.5 cm long.	southwest China (from Guangdong west to Yunnan), and also in northern Vietnam, northern Laos, extreme northern Thailand and northeastern Myanmar
	Calocedrus rupestris	The most recently discovered living species of Calocedrus, first described in 2004. It occurs exclusively on rocky limestone (karst) terrain, a habitat that has a very high level of endemism. The close proximity of these populations to the Chinese and Laotian borders indicates that the species may occur in those countries as well. It is a monoecious tree up to 25 m tall with a broadly rounded crown. The epithet "rupestris" means "rock-dwelling".	Vietnam

=== Extinct species ===
Name	Description	Distribution
†Calocedrus huashanensis	Described in 2012. It is known from compression fossils found in the Oligocene age Ningming Formation of southern China. Calocedrus huashanensis is known from branches and leaves.	southern China
†Calocedrus suleticensis	Known from fossils found in the Early Oligocene of Probostov (Holy Kluk Hill) in the volcanic complex of the Ceske stredohori Mts., Bohemia. Calocedrus suleticensis is known from a cone.	Czech Republic

== Uses ==
=== Archery ===
Incense cedar was one of the favored varieties of wood used to make bows by Native Americans in California. Like juniper, and Pacific yew, the other two coveted bow woods among Pacific Natives, this wood has excellent flexibility and compression strength-weight ratio. When backed with sinew, it produces extremely flexible, fast, hard-hitting bows, which are rivaled only by horn-sinew composite bows for their ability to store and release elastic energy. The archer Saxton Pope observed that Ishi used this wood to produce short bows.

=== Lumber ===
The wood of Calocedrus is soft, moderately decay-resistant, and with a strong spicy-resinous fragrance. That of C. decurrens is the primary material for wooden pencils, because it is soft and tends to sharpen easily without forming splinters. The two Asian species were (at least in the past) in very high demand for coffin manufacture in China, due to the scent of the wood and its decay resistance. It is likely that past over-exploitation is responsible for their current rarity.

Incense cedar was the preferred hearth board of the Native Peoples of Northern California for lighting fires by friction.

=== Cultivation ===
Calocedrus decurrens, the California incense cedar, is a popular ornamental tree, grown particularly in locations with cool summer climates like Britain, Washington and British Columbia. Its very narrow columnar crown in landscape settings, an unexplained consequence of the climatic conditions in these areas, is not shown by trees in their native 'wild' habitat. The California incense cedar is also valued for its drought tolerance. The Asian species are rarely cultivated.
