= Calocedrus rupestris =

Conservation status
- Endangered (IUCN 3.1)

Scientific classification
- Kingdom: Plantae
- Clade: Embryophytes
- Clade: Tracheophytes
- Clade: Gymnosperms
- Division: Pinophyta
- Class: Pinopsida
- Order: Cupressales
- Family: Cupressaceae
- Genus: Calocedrus
- Species: C. rupestris

Binomial name
- Calocedrus rupestris Aver., T.H.Nguyên & P.K.Lôc

Species of conifer

Calocedrus rupestris is a species of conifer in the cypress family, Cupressaceae, discovered in highly eroded rocky limestone mountains in northern Vietnam and first described in 2004. It also occurs in China.

Calocedrus rupestris is a medium-sized tree growing up to about 25 meters tall, with a trunk up to 1.2 meters in diameter. Many of the specimens observed in the wild were estimated to be some 600 to 800 years old, on the basis of preliminary year-ring observations.

It occurs together with other lime-adapted species in highly endemic relict coniferous forest. However, the ecological region extends from Vietnam into Laos and China. These limestone-based coniferous forests are both vulnerable and threatened, and although a reserve has been established, this species is listed as an endangered species.
