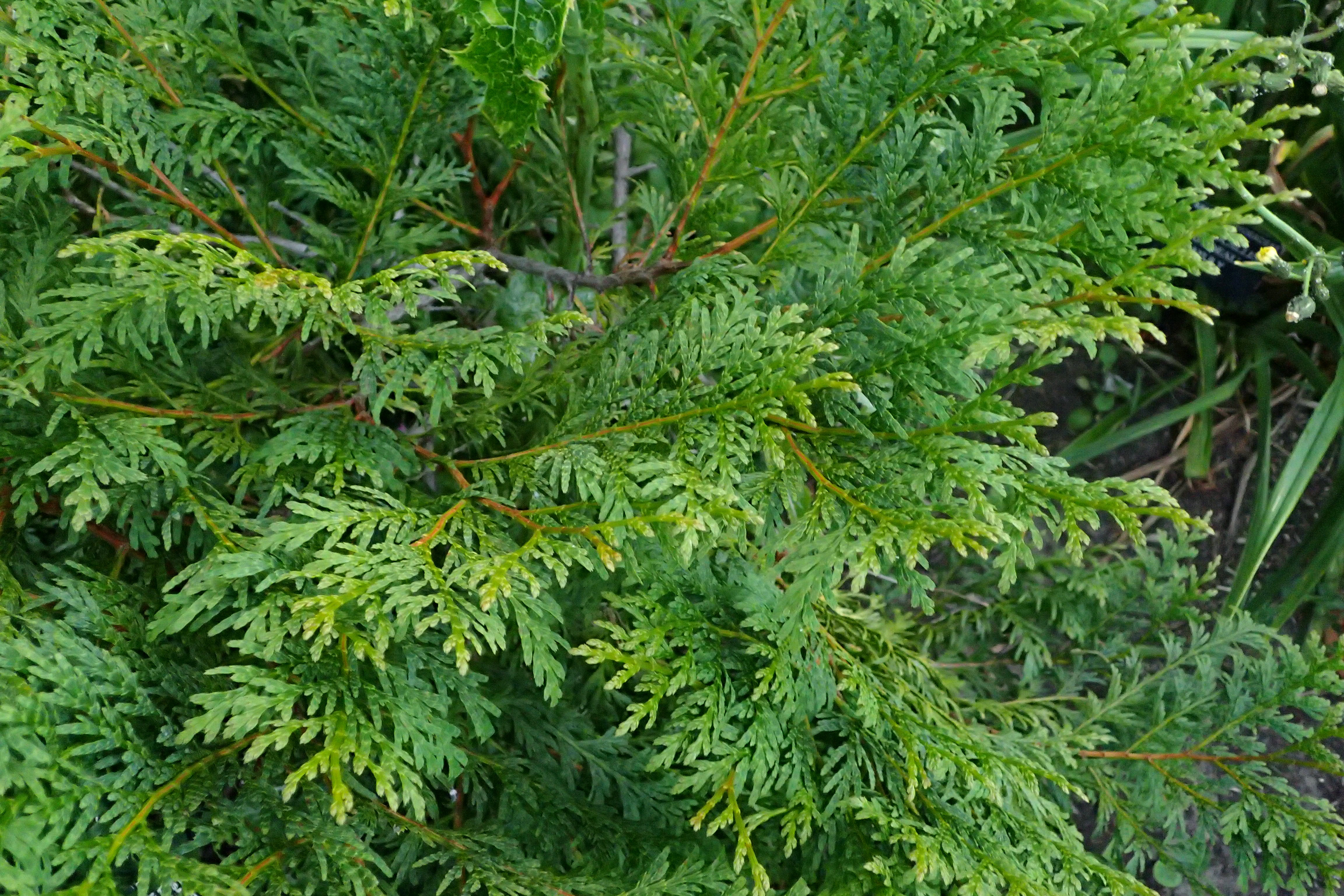

Conservation status
- Near Threatened (IUCN 3.1)

Scientific classification
- Kingdom: Plantae
- Clade: Embryophytes
- Clade: Tracheophytes
- Clade: Gymnosperms
- Division: Pinophyta
- Class: Pinopsida
- Order: Cupressales
- Family: Cupressaceae
- Genus: Calocedrus
- Species: C. macrolepis

Binomial name
- Calocedrus macrolepis Kurz

= Calocedrus macrolepis =

Species of conifer

Calocedrus macrolepis, commonly known as Chinese incense-cedar; is a species of conifer in the cypress family, Cupressaceae, native to southwest China (Guangdong west to Yunnan), northern Vietnam, northern Laos, extreme northern Thailand and northeastern Myanmar.

It can grow to a medium-size tree 25–35 m tall, with a trunk up to 2 m diameter. The bark is orange-brown weathering greyish, smooth at first, becoming fissured and exfoliating in long strips on the lower trunk on old trees. The foliage is produced in flattened sprays with scale-like leaves 1.5–8 mm long; they are arranged in opposite decussate pairs, with the successive pairs closely then distantly spaced, so forming apparent whorls of four; the facial pairs are flat, with the lateral pairs folded over their bases. The upper side of the foliage sprays is glossy green without stomata, the underside is white with dense stomata.

The seed cones are 10–20 mm long, pale purple with a whitish wax coating, with four (rarely six) scales arranged in opposite decussate pairs; the outer pair of scales each bears two winged seeds, the inner pair(s) usually being sterile; the cones are borne on a 1–2 cm long peduncle covered in very small (1 mm) scale leaves. The cones turn brown when mature about 8 months after pollination. The pollen cones are 4–8 mm long.

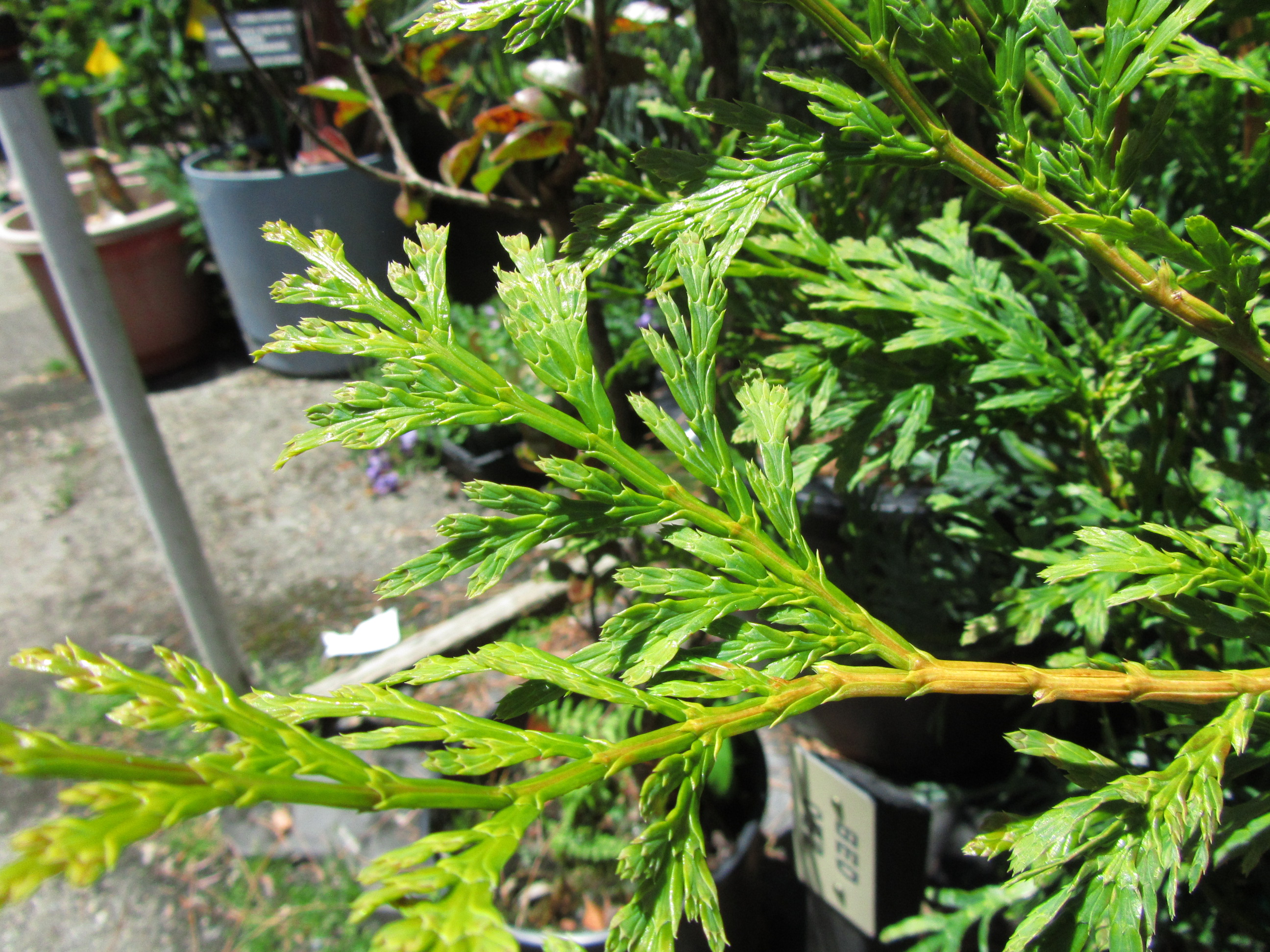
foliage of Calocedrus macrolepis

It is closely related to Calocedrus formosana, with the latter often treated as a variety of C. macrolepis. They differ most obviously in the shorter cone stem, only 5 mm long, of C. formosana.

The species is still fairly widespread and frequent in the wild, though threatened by over-harvesting for its valuable wood; it is also extensively planted within its native range for wood production. It is categorised by the IUCN as Vulnerable.

== See also ==
- Cedar wood
