= Chatan, Okinawa =

Chatan 北谷町
- Town
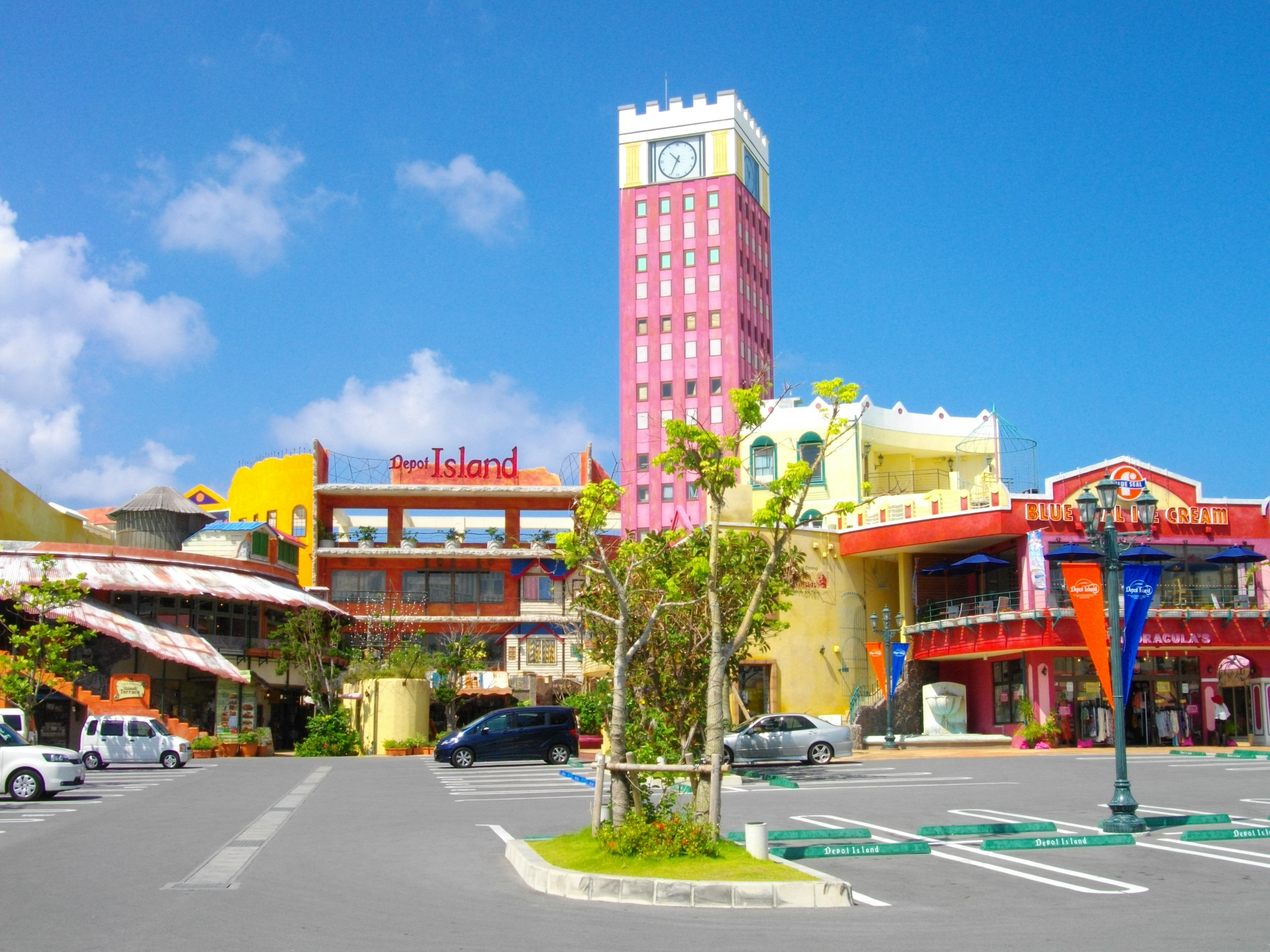
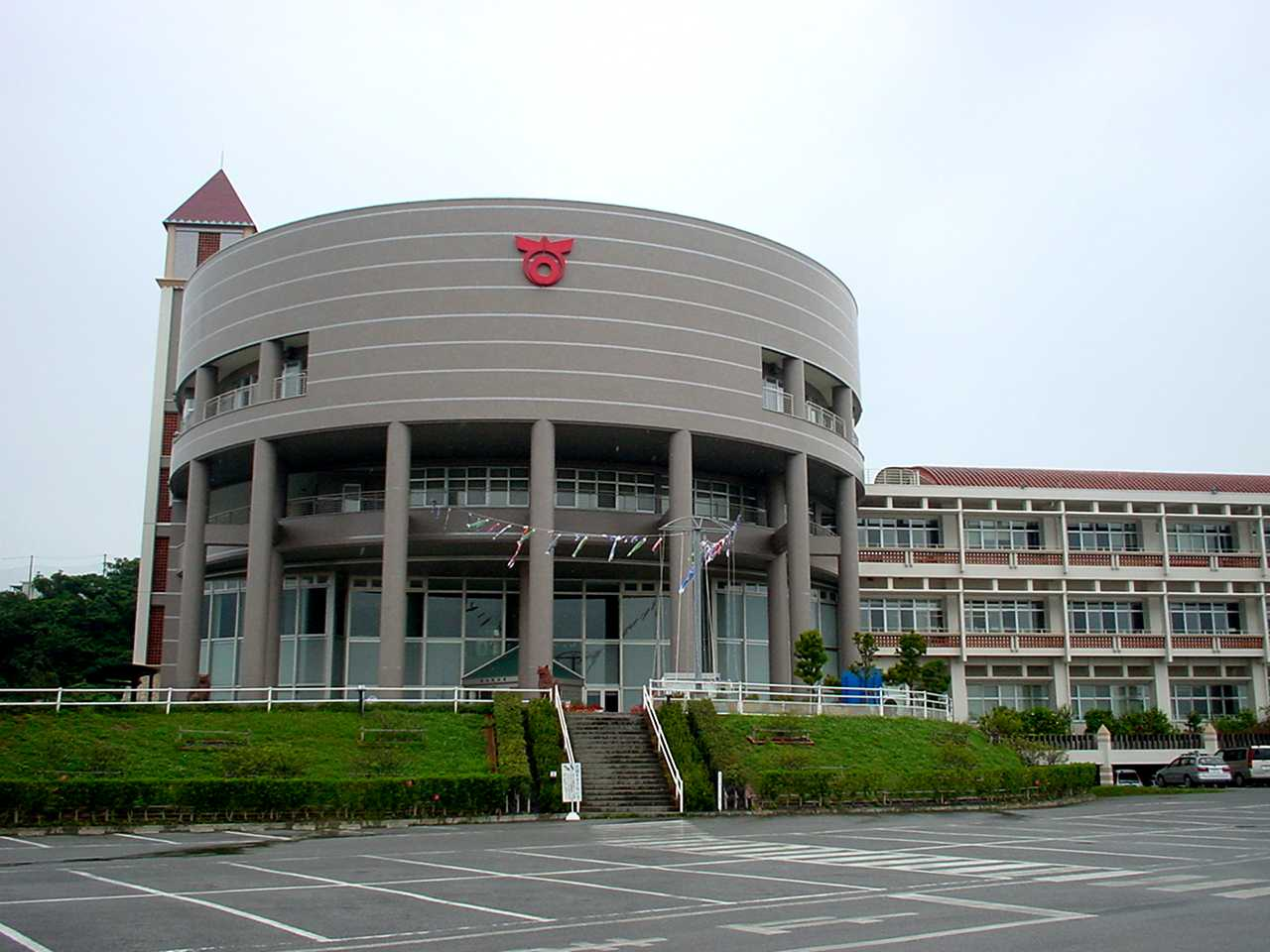
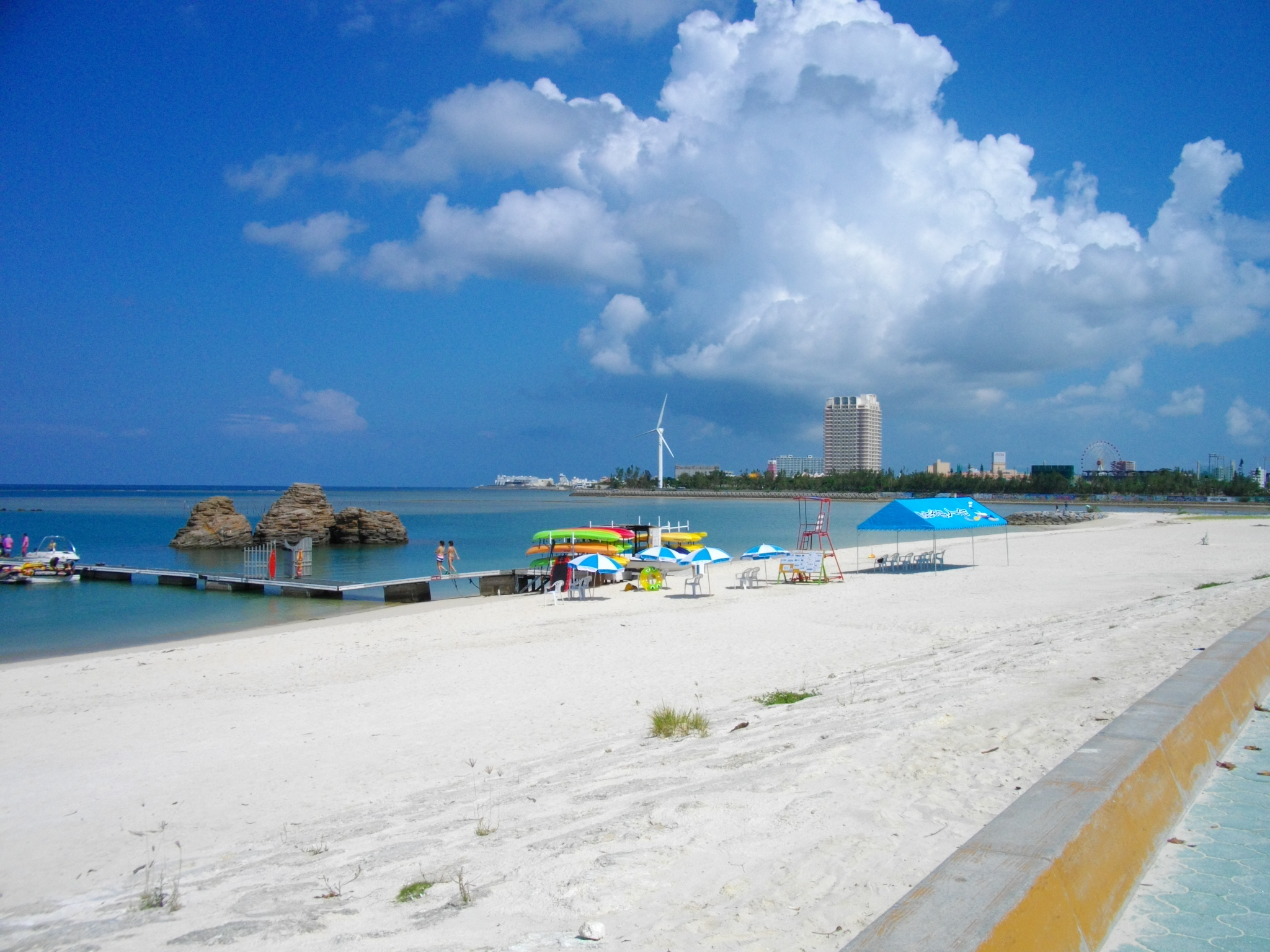
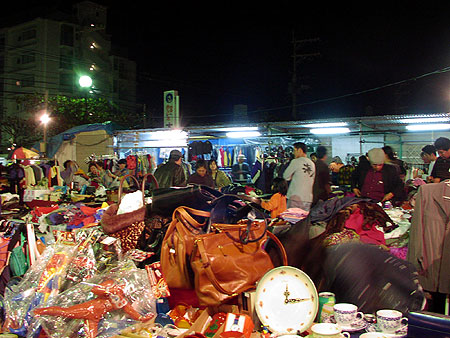
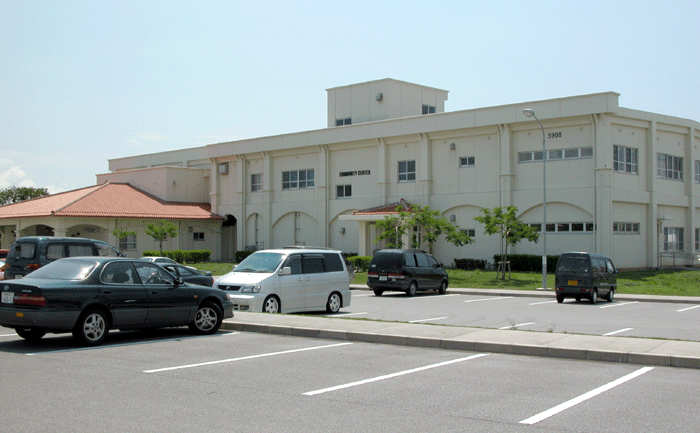
- American Village Chatan Town Hall Araha Beach Hamby Night Market Camp Foster Community Center Montage of Chatan

- Flag Emblem

- Location of Chatan in Okinawa Prefecture

- Location in Japan
- Coordinates: 26°19′12″N 127°45′50″E
- Country: Japan
- Region: Kyushu
- Prefecture: Okinawa Prefecture
- District: Nakagami

Government
  - Mayor: Masashi Toguchi

Area
  - Total: 13.62 km^{2} (5.26 sq mi)

Population (October 2016)
  - Total: 28,578
  - Density: 2,098/km^{2} (5,434/sq mi)
- Time zone: UTC+09:00 (JST)
- Website: www.chatan.jp

Chatan (北谷町, Chatan-chō; Okinawan: Chatan, Northern Ryukyuan: きたたん Kitatan) is a town located in Nakagami District, Okinawa Prefecture, Japan. As of October 2016 the town had an estimated population of 28,578 and the density of 2,100 per km^{2}. The total area of Chatan is 13.62 square kilometres (5.26 mi^{2}). 53.5% of the land area of the town is covered by United States military bases.

== Name ==
The town is called "Kitatani" in Japanese, and "Chatan" in Okinawan. The oldest written record of the name is from a 1577 document issued by the Ryukyu king to local officials. It is written as "Kita-tan Okite." The 1649 a map ("正保国絵図") submitted by the Satsuma domain to the Tokugawa shogunate states "Kita-tan Magiri". In the Kagoshima dialect, "tan" indicates a valley. It is thought that after the kanji for "North Valley" (北谷) was applied to "Kitatan," the pronunciation evolved from "kitatan" to "kichatan" → 'chichatan' → "chatan."

Phonological changes: kitatani → palatalization → kitʃatani → vowel deletion → ttʃatani → consonant deletion → tʃatan.

== Geography ==
Chatan is located in the central part of Okinawa Island. The town sits on the western coast of the island on the East China Sea. The east of Chatan is hilly and made up of Okinawan limestone. The hills of the eastern part of the town give way to low-lying land towards the coast.

Two rivers run through Chatan west into the East China Sea: the Shiruhi River to the north, and the Futenma River at the south.

Chatan, prior to World War II, was a noted area of rice production in Okinawa. The area was known as Chatan taa-bukkwa, a term in the Okinawa language for a "large area of rice paddies". Much of the land formerly used for rice cultivation is now utilized by military bases.

Chatan primarily runs along Route 58 and a largely man-made coastline which includes the area of what used to be the U.S. Marine Corps base of Camp Hamby (now Camp Foster). The northern half of Kitamae is nicknamed "Hamby Town" in recognition of this, and the Hamby Post Office is one of the first Japanese Postal offices to have an English name. Parts of Camp Foster and Camp Lester are in Chatan.

The American Kadena Air Base is located on and forms the northern boundary of Chatan which is further demarcated by Route 23 – also known locally as Kokutai Road. The U.S. air base also encompasses much land which was once part of Chatan's area including most of the ward once named Shimoseido.

=== Administrative divisions ===
The town includes sixteen wards.

- Chatan (北谷)
- Hamagawa (浜川)
- Ihei (伊平)
- Kamiseido (上勢頭)
- Kitamae (北前)
- Kuwae (桑江)
- Mihama (美浜)
- Minato (港)
- Miyagi (宮城)
- Ōmura (大村)
- Shimoseido (下勢頭)
- Sunabe (砂辺)
- Tamagami (玉上)
- Tōbaru (桃原)
- Ujibaru (宇地原)
- Yoshihara (吉原)

Kitamae, Mihama, and Sunabe enjoy great popularity among locals and tourists alike – for their many recreational and shopping destinations. Kamiseido, Ihei, and Kuwae are primarily local business and residential wards.

=== Neighboring municipalities ===
- Ginowan
- Kadena
- Kitanakagusuku
- Okinawa

== History ==
=== Palaeolithic ===
The town does not count any archaeological site dated of the Palaeolithic. Fossil human bones found in 1966 in Tōbaru Cave had first been dated of 16,000 yBP but recent surveys have attributed them to the Gusuku Period.

=== Kaizuka period ===
Chatan includes many sites from the Kaizuka period, dated as soon as the Early Kaizuka Phase I (Ireibaru) and for all the duration of the culture, with many sites of the Late Kaizuka Culture Phase I concentrating in the low lands of Hanzan and Kuwae. Important sites, in addition to Ireibaru, include

- Sunabe Shellmound (Early Kaizuka Period Phase IV and V) with a settlement at the top of the hill and the shell midden at the bottom,
- Kumayā Cave (Early Kaizuka Period Phase V) with a cemetery of at least fifty individuals in secondary burials,
- Kumuibaru (Late Kaizuka Period Phase II to Gusuku Period) with remains of barley, rice and foxtail millet dated of the 10th to 12th centuries,
- Hanzanbaru B (Late Kaizuka Period Phase II) with an iron adze of the 10th century.

=== Gusuku period ===
Chatan includes many sites of the Gusuku period such as settlements with the characteristic association of residential buildings and raised-floor granaries (Kushikanikubaru) or even one gusuku (Chatan Gusuku).

=== Early Kingdom Period ===
The oldest mention of the name of Chatan (Kitatan) has been found on the dedicatory inscription on a funerary urn dated of 1492 where it is written in hiragana. The name written with the current ideograms can be traced in historical documents back to the 16th century (Genealogical Records of the Ōso Family of the Yu Clan Japanese: 兪性大宗家家譜).

=== Kinsei Ryūkyū ===
Chatan Magiri figures on the 1649 "Map Villages Register" (Japanese: 絵図郷村帳) and includes the nine villages of Chatan, Kuwai (Kuwae), Hanzan, Sunahe (Sunabe), Noguni, Yara, Kadena, Yamauchi and Akina (Aniya). Between 1660 and 1670, with a number of administrative reforms, the village of Yamauchi was reattributed to Goeku Magiri and Akina to Ginowan Magiri. New villages were also created: Tamēshi, Rindō, Irei, Hamagawa and Nosato. By 1700, with the population rise in Shuri and the lack of administrative posts to give to all the members of the nobility, impoverished members of the nobility are authorised to practice agricultural activities, which leads to an exodus from the urban centre to the countryside and the creation of many new settlements called 'yādui'. In 1840, the English ship Indian Oak wrecked on the shoals on Chatan coast and the sailors were rescued by the inhabitants who helped them build another ship to leave the island.

=== Kindai Ryūkyū ===
In 1908 a reform replaced the administrative divisions of the Ryūkyū Kingdom by Japanese ones and Chatan Magiri became Chatan Village. Chatan was heavily fortified during the war by the Japanese forces. Several tunnels of the Shirahi-gawa River Suicide Boat Secret Tunnel Complex are conserved on the cliff below Chatan Gusuku. The landscape was heavily modified after the war by the construction of the U.S. bases (Kadena Air Base, Camp Zukeran, Camp Kuwae). In 1948, the northern part of Chatan was used to create Kadena Village. In 1980, Chatan Village became Chatan Town.

== Economy ==
=== Shopping and recreation ===
Much of the Hamby area is home to the "Hamby Free Zone". Though the name is misleading due to romanization errors, it is a large flea market that is scattered over an area of several blocks, though much of the land it is on is constantly relocated or bought for expansion of businesses. With the expansion of shopping/recreational businesses in the Mihama area, Chatan has become one of the most popular destinations for recreation. It is home to a small convention center, several shopping plazas, arcades, karaoke parlors, a 25-story hotel named "The Beach Tower" and several beaches. Sunabe is famous for a large sea wall which attracts many SCUBA divers and surfers.

The Chunichi Dragons of Nippon Professional Baseball have their spring training camp in Chatan.

== Education ==
The Town of Chatan maintains four elementary schools: Chatan (北谷町立北谷小学校), Chatan Number Two (北谷町立北谷第二小学校), Kitatama (北谷町立北玉小学校), and Hamagawa (北谷町立浜川小学校); each elementary school has an associated nursery school. The town also maintains two junior high schools: Chatan Junior High School (北谷町立北谷中学校) and Kuwae Junior High School (北谷町立桑江中学校).

Chatan Senior High School (沖縄県立北谷高等学校), a prefectural senior high school of the Okinawa Prefectural Board of Education, is located directly north of the town hall.

Department of Defense Education Activity (DoDEA) schools:

- Killin Elementary School on Camp Lester
- Zukeran Elementary School on Camp Foster
- Kubasaki High School on Camp Foster

== Transportation ==
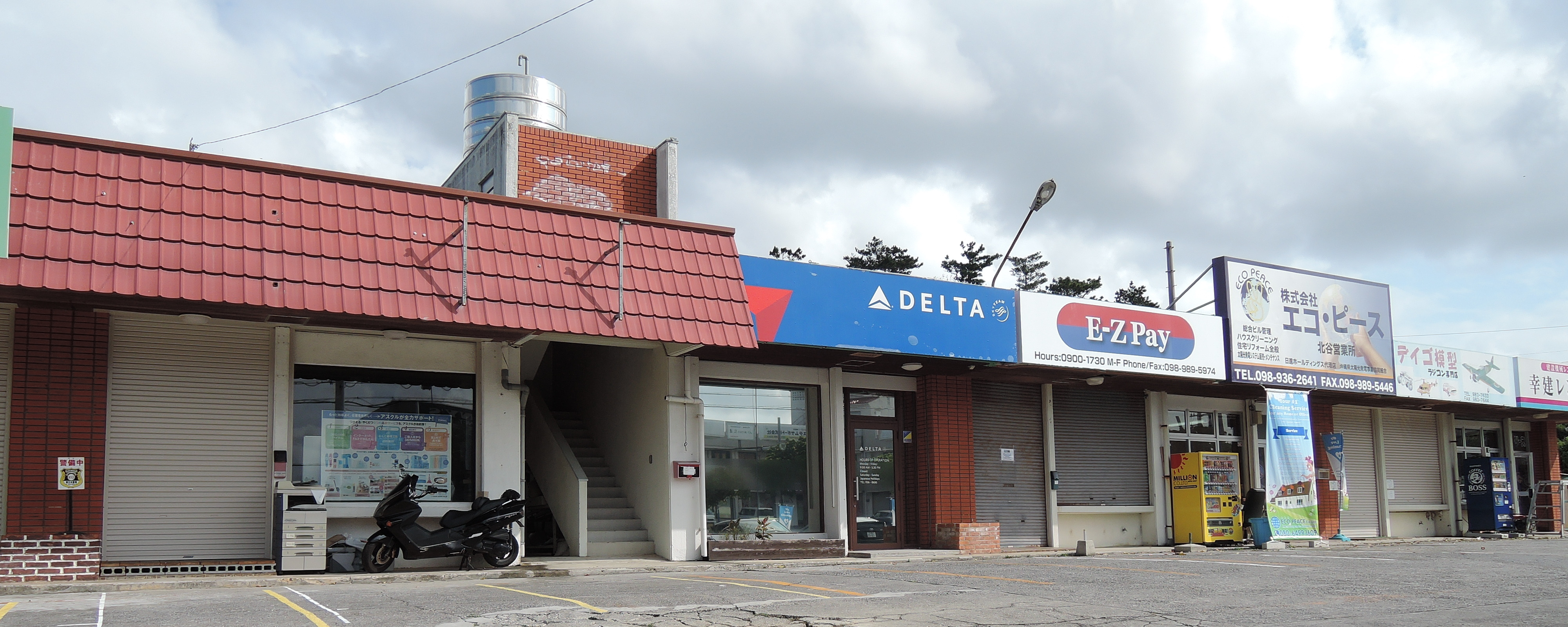
Delta Air Lines ticket office

Chatan is crossed from north to south by Japan National Route 58, which runs parallel to the coastal area of the town.

Delta Air Lines has a city ticket office in the Towa Building #1 (東和第一ビル Tōwa Daiichi Biru) in Chatan. Northwest Airlines previously operated a city ticket office in Chatan.

== Cultural and natural assets ==
Chatan Town hosts eight designated or registered tangible cultural properties and monuments, at the national or municipal level.

- Name (Japanese) (Type of registration)

=== Cultural Properties ===
- Chatan Uchinā-yā residence main house (北谷町うちなぁ家主屋) (National)
- Chatan Uchinā-yā residence pig pen latrines (北谷町うちなぁ家ふーる) (National)
- Chibugā Spring (ちぶ川) (Municipal)

=== Folk Cultural Properties ===
- Agari-no-Utaki Sacred Site (inside Chatan Gusuku) (北谷城内「東ノ御嶽」) (Municipal)
- Tun Sacred Site (inside Chatan Gusuku) (北谷城内「殿」)(Municipal)

=== Historic Sites ===
- Ireibaru Site (伊礼原遺跡) (National)
- Chatan Castle Site (北谷城跡) (National)
- Hamagawa Ugan Site (浜川ウガン遺跡) (Municipal)
