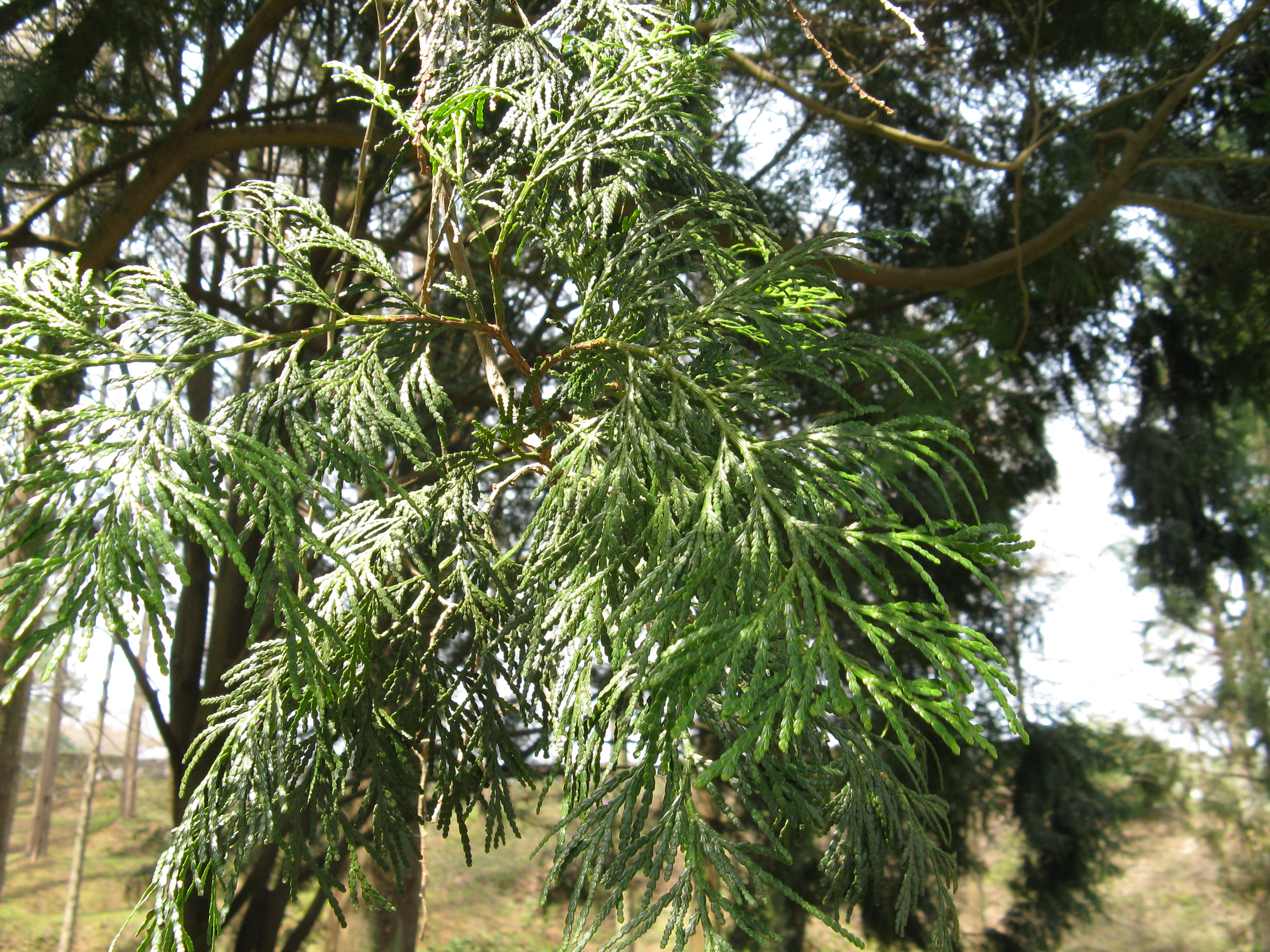

Conservation status
- Endangered (IUCN 3.1)

Scientific classification
- Kingdom: Plantae
- Clade: Tracheophytes
- Clade: Gymnosperms
- Division: Pinophyta
- Class: Pinopsida
- Order: Cupressales
- Family: Cupressaceae
- Genus: Calocedrus
- Species: C. formosana

Binomial name
- Calocedrus formosana (Florin) Florin

= Calocedrus formosana =

Species of conifer

Calocedrus formosana, Taiwan Incense-cedar; Chinese: 臺灣肖楠; pinyin: tái wān xiào nán or 臺灣翠柏) is a conifer in the cypress family, Cupressaceae, endemic to Taiwan.

== Descriptions ==
It is a medium-size tree to 20–25 m tall, with a trunk up to 3 meters in diameter. The bark is orange-brown weathering greyish, smooth at first, becoming fissured and exfoliating in long strips on the lower trunk on old trees. The foliage is produced in flattened sprays with scale-like leaves 1.5–8 mm long; they are arranged in opposite decussate pairs, with the successive pairs closely then distantly spaced, so forming apparent whorls of four; the facial pairs are flat, with the lateral pairs folded over their bases. The upper side of the foliage sprays is green without stomata, the underside is marked with dense patches of white stomata.

The seed cones are 10–15 mm long, pale purple with a whitish wax coating, with four (rarely six) scales arranged in opposite decussate pairs; the outer pair of scales each bears two winged seeds, the inner pair(s) usually being sterile; the cones are borne on a 4–6 mm long peduncle covered in small (2 mm) scale leaves. The cones turn brown when mature about 8 months after pollination. The pollen cones are 4–5 mm long.

== Variety species ==
It is very similar to Calocedrus macrolepis, and some botanists treat it as a variety of that, C. macrolepis var. formosana. They differ most obviously in the longer cone stem, 10–20 mm long, of C. macrolepis.

== Threats ==
The species has a very limited native range of less than 5,000 km^{2}, and is threatened by over-harvesting for its valuable wood and conversion of natural forest to plantations of faster-growing exotic species. Some areas are now protected in reserves, and a limited amount of replanting is taking place, but an overall decline continues. It is categorised by the International Union for Conservation of Nature as an endangered species.

== See also ==
- Cedar wood
