= Entebbe (film) =

2018 film by José Padilha

- UK theatrical release poster
- Directed by: José Padilha
- Written by: Gregory Burke
- Produced by: Tim Bevan; Liza Chasin; Eric Fellner; Ron Halpern; Kate Solomon; Michelle Wright
- Starring: Rosamund Pike; Daniel Brühl; Eddie Marsan; Ben Schnetzer; Lior Ashkenazi; Denis Ménochet
- Cinematography: Lula Carvalho
- Edited by: Daniel Rezende
- Music by: Rodrigo Amarante
- Production companies: Participant Media; Working Title Films
- Distributed by: Focus Features; Entertainment One
- Release dates: February 19, 2018 (Berlinale); March 16, 2018 (United States); May 11, 2018 (United Kingdom)
- Running time: 107 minutes
- Countries: United Kingdom; United States
- Language: English
- Box office: $9.6 million

Entebbe (titled 7 Days in Entebbe in the U.S.) is a 2018 action thriller film directed by José Padilha and written by Gregory Burke. The film recounts the story of the 1976 Entebbe raid counter-terrorist hostage-rescue operation, focusing on the political crisis between Israeli leaders Yitzhak Rabin and Shimon Peres as well as the internal motivations of the German hijackers played by Rosamund Pike and Daniel Brühl.

Released in the United States on 16 March 2018 and in the United Kingdom on 11 May 2018, the film received widely unfavorable reviews from critics, who criticized its slow pacing, heavy-handed framing, and flat dramatic execution.

== Plot ==
On 27 June 1976, Wilfried Böse and Brigitte Kuhlmann, two members of the ultra-leftist Revolutionary Cells terrorist syndicate, hijack Air France Flight 139, flying from Tel Aviv to Paris, during the flight's initial stopover at Athens. Quickly thereafter, Israeli prime minister Yitzhak Rabin and defense minister Shimon Peres, both political rivals, are alerted of the hijacking.

During a refueling stop at Benghazi, Böse releases a female passenger who had seemingly suffered a miscarriage; however, unbeknownst to him, the woman had feigned it to escape. After taking off once more, the hijackers commandeer the plane to Entebbe, Uganda on 28 June, where they unite with terrorists from the Popular Front for the Liberation of Palestine; the two groups had jointly orchestrated the hijacking.

The next morning, the passengers are escorted to a dilapidated airport terminal, where they are greeted by Ugandan dictator Idi Amin, who is in league with the hijackers. Concomitantly, Rabin orders Peres and Lt. Gen. Motta Gur, the chief of staff of the Israel Defense Forces (IDF), to sketch a military operation aimed at rescuing the hostages. Peres suggests invading the airport, but Rabin and Gur reject it outright. Concurrently, the terrorists begin to segregate Israeli and non-Israeli hostages, much to Böse's fury; he compares the segregation of the hostages to the Nazi-enforced Holocaust.

Favoring a diplomatic approach, Rabin initiates negotiations with Amin, much to the detestation of Peres, who supports a military option. Rabin's diplomatic overture bears fruit – on 30 June, the hijackers release 48 non-Israeli hostages whilst retaining control over the remaining Israeli hostages. With mounting public pressure against Israel's insistence on maintaining its policy of non-negotiation with terrorists, Rabin finally concedes to initiate negotiations with the hijackers on 1 July. As a consequence, the hijackers postpone the deadline of the negotiations to 4 July. Regardless of the developments, the IDF initiates preparations for a rescue mission, consisting of the Sayeret Matkal elite commando unit, headed by Lt. Col.Yoni Netanyahu; the group soon receives support from a reluctant Rabin, who would still prefer a diplomatic solution

On 3 July, with preparations for the rescue mission codenamed Operation Thunderbolt finalized, Rabin convenes the cabinet for a vote regarding the status of the operation; they unanimously vote to proceed with the mission, with Gur's endorsement. The strike force, having already departed for Uganda, is authorized to proceed with the rescue.

That night, four Israeli C-130 Hercules transport aircraft carrying the strike force land discreetly at Entebbe. Trying to maintain the element of surprise, the unit approaches the terminal in a black Mercedes limo disguised as Amin's state vehicle. However, one of the operatives prematurely opens fire, which alerts the hijackers and the adjoining Ugandan soldiers; Böse initially fixes on killing the hostages to foil the oncoming rescue team, but changes his mind at the last second. The operatives storm the building and engage both the terrorists and Ugandan soldiers; in the ensuing melee, Netanyahu as well as Böse and Kuhlmann are killed along with the remaining terrorists and several Ugandan soldiers. With the airport secured, the strike force evacuates 102 hostages by plane.

Elsewhere, Peres congratulates Rabin on the success of the operation; the latter solemnly retorts that the preservation of peace via diplomacy is the only way to ensure the avoidance of further incidents between Israelis and Palestinians. The film's ending displays archival footage of the survivors' return to Israel, with brief notes about the fates of Rabin, Peres, Yoni Netanyahu and the lack of a peace process as of 2018.

== Cast ==
- Daniel Brühl as Wilfried Böse
- Rosamund Pike as Brigitte Kuhlmann
- Eddie Marsan as Shimon Peres
- Lior Ashkenazi as Yitzhak Rabin
- Denis Ménochet as Jacques Le Moine
- Ben Schnetzer as Zeev Hirsch
- Angel Bonanni as Col. Yonatan Netanyahu
- Nonso Anozie as Idi Amin
- Juan Pablo Raba as Juan Pablo
- Omar Berdouni as Faiz Jaber
- Mark Ivanir as Gen. Mordechai (Motta) Gur
- Peter Sullivan as Amos Eiran
- Zina Zinchenko as Sarah Mayes
- Andrea Deck as Patricia Martel
- Brontis Jodorowsky as Captain Michel Bacos
- Vincent Riotta as Gen. Dan Shomron
- Yiftach Klein as Ehud Barak
- Natalie Stone as Leah Rabin
- Trudy Weiss as Dora Bloch
- Michael Lewis as Major Muki Betser
- Tomer Capone as soldier

== Production ==
On 11 February 2016, it was announced that José Padilha would next direct Entebbe for Working Title Films and StudioCanal, from a script by Gregory Burke. On 29 July 2016, Rosamund Pike, Daniel Brühl and Vincent Cassel joined to play the lead roles in the film, with Cassel ultimately not participating.

Principal photography on the film began on 14 November 2016 in Malta, and production also took place in the U.K. During filming, a plane landed at Malta International Airport as a result of a real hijacking and scenes of passengers exiting after negotiations had succeeded were used in the movie. An old PIA Airbus A310 was reportedly purchased by the film crew with the price of USD 200,000, then repainted in the colors of the plane involved in the incident for use in the film. However, a 2020 lawsuit filed by PIA accused the airline's CEO Bernd Hildenbrand of arbitrarily selling the plane to Germany to embezzle public funds.

The film features extensive footage of the noted Batsheva Dance Company, dancing to a modern version of the traditional Jewish song Echad Mi Yodea. One of the characters in the film is a dancer in the troupe, and the dance is shown as the film opens and then throughout the film, intercut with portions of the narrative.

== Release ==
The film premiered on 19 February 2018 at the 68th Berlin International Film Festival. It was released in the United States on 16 March 2018, and received a release in the United Kingdom on 11 May 2018.

=== Promotion ===
An initial trailer for Entebbe was released on 7 December 2017, using the 1971 song "I'd Love to Change the World" by the band Ten Years After.

== Reception ==
=== Critical reception ===
On review aggregator website Rotten Tomatoes, the film holds an approval rating of 24% based on 119 reviews, and an average rating of 4.9/10. The website's critical consensus reads, "7 Days in Entebbe has a worthy story to tell, but loses sight of its most compelling elements in a dull dramatization of riveting real-life events." On Metacritic, the film has a weighted average score of 49 out of 100, based on 29 critics, indicating "mixed or average" reviews.

David Ehrlich of IndieWire gave the film a "C" and called it competent but pointless, saying: "When all the dust settles, we're left right where we started, and with nothing to show for it but a fleeting reminder that peace is impossible without negotiation. It's a lesson that history has failed to teach us, filtered through a movie that doesn't understand why." The Chicago Sun-Times's Richard Roeper gave the film 2 out of 4 stars, writing, "All too often in 7 Days in Entebbe, primary characters on all sides of this 1970s period-piece political thriller state the obvious – and then state it again, and then have to stand around while someone else states the obvious one more time, just in case the folks in the seats have yet to grasp the stakes at hand and the dilemmas in play."

Liel Leibovitz of Tablet criticized the film's downplaying of violence, such as the final raid being "shot in infuriating slow-motion and cross-cut with a modern dance performance", writing that the lack of violence eliminates the possibility of "catharsis" and renders the film a "vapid and vacuous statement".

=== Historical accuracy ===
The film puts Yonatan Netanyahu's death much earlier in the raid than in the Netanyahu family's version of events. Director Padilha said that this placement was based on interviews with participants in the raid. Although the production had commissioned British historian Saul David's 2015 study Operation Thunderbolt as a guide, the director opted to subordinate historical accuracy to dramatic effect in a number of scenes. Most notably, the division of the hostages and the Air France crew staying with the hostages are presented in a way that contradicts eyewitness accounts gathered by David.

== See also ==
- Victory at Entebbe – a 1976 American TV film about the events of Operation Entebbe
- Raid on Entebbe – a 1977 American TV film about the same event
- Operation Thunderbolt – a 1977 Israeli film
- The Last King of Scotland – a 2006 British-German film containing the raid as a subplot
- The Delta Force – a 1986 Israeli-American action thriller partially inspired by the events
