= Magdalena Kopp =

German photographer and terrorist (1948–2015)

- Born: April 2, 1948; Neu-Ulm, Bavaria, Allied-occupied Germany
- Died: 15 June 2015 (aged 67); Neu-Ulm, Bavaria, Germany
- Occupation: Photographer
- Known for: Wife and accomplice of Ilich Ramírez Sánchez
- Spouse: Ilich Ramírez Sánchez

Magdalena Cäcilia Kopp (2 April 1948 – 15 June 2015) was a German photographer and member of the Frankfurt Revolutionary Cells (RZ). She was the wife and accomplice of terrorist Ilich Ramírez Sánchez, also known as "Carlos the Jackal".

== Early life ==
Magdalena Kopp grew up in Neu-Ulm, and after leaving school trained as a photographer. In 1967 she moved to Frankfurt, and in the early 1970s was associated with the leftist student circles, living with friends in a shared flat. She worked for the publication Red Star and was one of the founders of the Frankfurt Revolutionary Cells (RZ). Members of this group, in addition to her new friend Johannes Weinrich were Hans-Joachim Klein, Wilfried Böse and Brigitte Kuhlmann. They were involved in the attack on the OPEC conference in 1975 and in the hijacking of an Air France plane to Entebbe in 1976.

Through Weinrich, she met his friend, the internationally wanted political militant/terrorist Ilich Ramírez Sánchez, known as Carlos. Later she moved to France and joined the command "Boudia" led by Carlos, who also became her lover. Soon she was working as part of his inner circle.

== Arrest ==
On 16 February 1982, she was arrested in Paris together with Bruno Bréguet, a Swiss citizen who had served a prison sentence in Israel for possession of explosives. When a policeman noticed their Peugeot car was improperly parked and asked to see their papers, Bréguet attempted to shoot him, but had forgotten to release his pistol's safety catch and was overpowered. Kopp, who had bolted, was cornered a block away from the scene and surrendered. Five kilos of Penthrit (pentaerythritol tetranitrate) were found in the car, as well as false passports and other incriminating documents, including sketch plans of various locations. Under interrogation, it was established that they were planning to blow up the offices of the exiled Arabic political magazine Al Watan Al Arabi because it had annoyed Syria's President Hafez al-Assad, who had granted Kopp, Carlos and other terrorists asylum in Damascus.

== Time in prison ==
On 24 May 1982 Kopp was sentenced to four years' imprisonment. Boudia Command carried out several terrorist attacks to pressure the government for the release of Kopp and Bréguet. Kopp was released on 4 May 1985 with a reduction of seven months of her sentence for good behavior but was deported to Germany where she was detained and questioned again, this time by German police. Subsequently, she was set free and in less than a month she moved to Damascus, Syria, where she met and reunited with Ilyich Ramirez (Carlos). In 1985 they were married.

== Later life ==
On 17 August 1986 she gave birth to their daughter Elba Rosa Ramirez Kopp. She and Carlos lived quietly until 1990 when Syria, as an ally of United States in the Gulf War, asked them to leave the country. They went to Libya, but it rejected their residency visa and they had to return to Syria, where they remained for a short time. Kopp and Carlos then decided to separate and she went to Venezuela with his mother while Carlos traveled to Sudan with a diplomatic passport. In Venezuela, she lived in Valencia for a few months until the Venezuelan press found out about her and then made ample references to her past, due to her association with Carlos. Kopp then took steps to return to Germany and on finding that the government had no charges against her, returned home where she lived with her daughter and stayed out of politics.

In 2007, she published her memoirs entitled Die Terrorjahre: Mein Leben an der Seite von Carlos (The Years of Terror: My Life with Carlos). She lived with her daughter in her hometown of Neu-Ulm, Germany, until her death on 15 June 2015.

== Portrayal ==
Kopp is portrayed by Nora von Waldstätten in the 2010 French-German television mini-series Carlos.
