= Victory at Entebbe =

1976 television film directed by Marvin J. Chomsky

- Theatrical film release poster of Victory at Entebbe
- Genre: Action; Drama; History; Thriller
- Written by: Ernest Kinoy
- Directed by: Marvin J. Chomsky
- Starring: Helmut Berger; Linda Blair; Kirk Douglas; Richard Dreyfuss; Helen Hayes; Anthony Hopkins; Burt Lancaster; Christian Marquand; Elizabeth Taylor; Theodore Bikel; David Groh; Jessica Walter
- Theme music composer: Charles Fox
- Country of origin: United States
- Original language: English

Production
- Executive producer: David L. Wolper
- Producer: Robert Guenette
- Production locations: Warner Brothers Burbank Studios - 4000 Warner Boulevard, Burbank, California
- Cinematography: Jim Kilgore
- Editors: Michael Gavaldon; Jim McElroy; David Saxon
- Running time: 119 min.
- Production company: David L. Wolper Productions

Original release
- Network: ABC
- Release: December 13, 1976

Victory at Entebbe is a 1976 American made-for-television action-drama film for broadcast on ABC, directed by Marvin J. Chomsky. The film starred Helmut Berger, Linda Blair, Anthony Hopkins, Burt Lancaster, Elizabeth Taylor, Richard Dreyfuss, and Kirk Douglas. Julius Harris portrayed Idi Amin, following the fatal heart attack suffered by the actor originally cast in the role, Godfrey Cambridge. (Note: At one point, Joseph Olita was also approached to play Amin in Victory at Entebbe.) The film was theatrically released in Europe.

Victory at Entebbe is based on the actual event Operation Entebbe, the raid on Entebbe Airport (now Entebbe International Airport) in Uganda and the freeing of Israeli hostages on July 4, 1976. It was the first of three films made in the 1970s based on the Entebbe Raid. The other two, Raid on Entebbe (1977) and Operation Thunderbolt (1977, Israel) soon followed. A fourth film, Entebbe (titled 7 Days in Entebbe in the U.S.) was released over four decades later in 2018.

== Plot ==
On June 27, 1976, four terrorists belonging to a splinter group of the Popular Front for the Liberation of Palestine under the orders of Wadie Haddad boarded and hijacked an Air France Airbus A300 in Athens, Greece.

With the permission of President Idi Amin (Julius Harris), the terrorists divert the airliner and its hostages to Entebbe Airport in Uganda. (Note: The Entebbe airport is Uganda's main airport and is situated near the capital city of Kampala, Uganda.) After identifying Israeli passengers, the non-Jewish passengers are freed while a series of demands are made, including the release of 40 Palestinian militants held in Israel, in exchange for the hostages.

The Cabinet of Israel, led by Prime Minister Yitzhak Rabin (Anthony Hopkins), unwilling to give in to terrorist demands, plans a top-secret military raid. This commando operation, military code name: "Operation Thunderbolt", will be carried out over 2,500 miles (4,000 km) from home and will take place on the Jewish Sabbath.

While still negotiating with the terrorists, who now numbered seven individuals, the Israeli military prepared two Lockheed C-130 Hercules transports for the raid. The transports refuelled in Kenya before landing at Entebbe Airport under the cover of darkness. The commandos led by Brigadier General Dan Shomron (Harris Yulin) had to contend with a large armed Ugandan military detachment and used a ruse to overcome the defenses. A black Mercedes limousine had been carried on board and was used to fool sentries that it was the official car which President Amin used on an impromptu visit to the airport.

Nearly complete surprise was achieved but a firefight resulted, ending with all seven terrorists and 45 Ugandan soldiers killed. The hostages were gathered together and most were quickly put on the idling C-130 aircraft. During the raid, one commando (the breach unit commander Yonatan Netanyahu (Richard Dreyfuss), brother of future Prime Minister Benjamin Netanyahu), and three of the hostages died. (Note: A fourth hostage, Dora Bloch, who had been ill and had been taken to Mulago Hospital in Kampala, was murdered by the Ugandans on Idi Amin's orders.)

With 102 hostages aboard and on their way to freedom, a group of Israeli commandos remained behind to destroy the Ugandan Air Force MiG-17 and MiG-21 fighters to prevent a retaliation. All the survivors of the attack force then joined in flying back to Israel via Nairobi and Sharm El Sheikh.

== Cast ==
In alphabetical order:

- Helmut Berger as Wilfried Böse
- Linda Blair as Chana Vilnofsky
- Kirk Douglas as Hershel Vilnofsky
- Richard Dreyfuss as Col. Yoni Netanyahu
- Helen Hayes as Etta Grossman Wise
- David Groh as Benjamin Wise
- Anthony Hopkins as Yitzhak Rabin
- Burt Lancaster as Shimon Peres
- Elizabeth Taylor as Edra Vilnofsky
- Julius Harris as Idi Amin
- Theodore Bikel as Yakov Shlomo
- Harris Yulin as Gen. Dan Shomron
- Christian Marquand as Captain Dukas
- Jessica Walter as Nomi Haroun
- Stefan Gierasch as Gen. Mordechai Gur
- David Sheiner as Aaron Olav
- Severn Darden as Moshe Meyer
- Allan Miller as Nathan Haroun
- Bibi Besch as Brigitte Kuhlmann

== Production ==
Victory at Entebbe was filmed on videotape at Burbank Studios in California and later transferred to film for distribution around the world, giving the film the slightly stilted visual style of a studio-bound TV drama, but with a film-like look, and big Hollywood names in the cast. Shooting on video shortened the production time, allowing the film to be ready for television less than six months after the event that inspired it.

== Reception ==
Although both telefilms Victory at Entebbe and Raid on Entebbe relied on their star-studded casts, neither were able to make much of an impact with audiences (Victory is generally considered the weaker of the two). The portrayal of a heroic Israeli military in Victory at Entebbe, however, led to pro-Palestinian states alleging that the film was nothing more than Zionist propaganda.

Victory at Entebbe was recognized at the 29th Primetime Emmy Awards, where screenwriter Ernest Kinoy received an Emmy Award nomination for his teleplay.

== See also ==
- Raid on Entebbe
- Operation Thunderbolt
- 7 Days in Entebbe
