= Operation Thunderbolt (film) =

- United States theatrical release poster
- Directed by: Menahem Golan
- Written by: Ken Globus; Menahem Golan; Clarke Reynolds
- Produced by: Sybil Danning; Menahem Golan; Yoram Globus; Rony Yakov
- Starring: Klaus Kinski; Yehoram Gaon; Sybil Danning; Assi Dayan; Gila Almagor; Arik Lavie; Ori Levy; Mark Heath
- Cinematography: Adam Greenberg
- Edited by: Dov Hoenig
- Music by: Dov Seltzer
- Release date: March 17, 1977 (Israel)
- Running time: 124 minutes
- Country: Israel
- Languages: Hebrew; English; Arabic; German; French; Spanish

Operation Thunderbolt, known in Israel as Mivtza Yonatan (מבצע יונתן, literally 'Operation Jonathan'), also called Entebbe: Operation Thunderbolt in the US, is a 1977 Israeli film directed and co-written by Menahem Golan and starring Klaus Kinski, Yehoram Gaon and Sybil Danning. The film is based on an actual event – the hijacking of a flight by terrorists and the freeing of Israeli hostages on July 4, 1976 at Entebbe Airport in Uganda. The Entebbe raid was known as Operation Entebbe or Operation Thunderbolt. Operation Thunderbolt follows the events following the flight's takeoff until the hostages' return to Israel. The film was nominated for the Academy Award for Best Foreign Language Film.

== Plot ==
On June 27, 1976, four terrorists belonging to a splinter group of the Popular Front for the Liberation of Palestine under the orders of Wadie Haddad boarded and hijacked Flight 139, an Air France Airbus A300 in Athens, Greece. Two of the terrorists are West Germans named Wilfried Boese and Halima, and the other two are Palestinians.

After landing to refuel in Libya, the four hijackers force the airliner to take off once again. With President Idi Amin's permission, the terrorists divert the airliner and its hostages to Entebbe Airport in Uganda. The hijackers are joined at Entebbe by more Palestinian militants. After identifying Israeli passengers, the non-Jewish passengers are freed while a series of demands are made, including the release of 40 Palestinian militants held in Israel, in exchange for the hostages.

The Cabinet of Israel, unwilling to give in to terrorist demands, is faced with difficult decisions as their deliberations lead to a top-secret military raid. This commando operation, "Operation Thunderbolt", will be carried out over 2,500 miles (4,000 km) from home and will take place on the Jewish Sabbath.

While still negotiating with the terrorists, who now numbered seven individuals, the Israeli military prepared a group of Lockheed C-130 Hercules transports for the raid. The transports landed at Entebbe Airport under the cover of darkness. The commandos led by Brigadier General Dan Shomron had to contend with a large armed Ugandan military detachment and used a ruse to overcome the defenses. A black Mercedes limousine had been carried on board and was used to fool sentries that it was the official car that President Amin used on an impromptu visit to the airport.

Nearly complete surprise was achieved but a firefight resulted, ending with all seven terrorists and 45 Ugandan soldiers killed. The hostages were gathered together and most were quickly put on the idling C-130 aircraft. During the raid, one commando (the breach unit commander Yonatan Netanyahu, brother of future Prime Minister Benjamin Netanyahu), and three of the hostages, died. (Note: A fourth hostage, Dora Bloch, who had been taken to Mulago Hospital in Kampala, was murdered by the Ugandans on Idi Amin's orders.)

With 102 hostages aboard and on their way to freedom, a group of Israeli commandos remained behind to destroy the Ugandan Air Force MiG-17 and MiG-21 fighters to prevent a retaliation. All the survivors of the attack force then joined in flying to Nairobi for refueling and then back to Israel via Sharm El Sheikh.

== Cast ==
- Yehoram Gaon as Lieutenant Colonel Yonatan Netanyahu
- Klaus Kinski as Wilfried Böse
- Sybil Danning as Halima
- Gila Almagor as Nurit Aviv
- Assi Dayan as Shuki (based on Muki Betser)
- Arik Lavie as Brigadier General Dan Shomron
- Shaike Ophir as Gadi Arnon
- Gabi Amrani as Gabriel
- Shmuel Rodensky as Dr. Weissberg
- Reuven Bar Yotam as Shlomo Bar David
- Shoshik Shani as Alma Levi
- Rachel Markus as Dora Bloch
- Heli Goldenberg as Dalia Cohen
- Avraham Ronai as Mr. Borovitz
- Miryam Nevo as Ida Borovitz
- Asher Tsarfaty as Ze'ev
- Ori Levy as General Benny Peled, Commander of The Israel Air Force
- Avraham Ben Yosef as Dr. Avner Tal
- Shlomo Vishinsky as Shlomo Bloch
- Yehuda Efroni as Yehuda Goldstein
- Shimon Bar as German Doctor
- Uzi Cohen as Israel Soldier Dressed As Idi Amin (uncredited)
- Heinz Bernard as Mr. Kohan (uncredited)
- Aryeh Moskona as Yitzchak Bloch
- Arie Gardus as Major General Yekutiel Adam, Overall Operation Commander
- Mark Heath as Idi Amin Dada
- Henry Czarniak as Michel Bacos
- Oded Teomi as Dan Zamir, Government Spokesman
- Ami Weinberg as Ram Weissberg (Based on Jean-Jacques Maimoni)
- Yitzchak Rabin as Himself
- Shimon Peres as Himself
- Yigal Allon as Himself
- Gad Yaakobi as Himself

== Production ==
Pre-production on a Hollywood film began shortly after the actual raid had taken place. With a projected large budget, and efforts to land Steve McQueen in a leading role, the project collapsed. At that point, Menahem Golan as director and co-producer, Yoram Globus also as co-producer and Ken Globus as screenwriter, took over the aborted project.

The Golan/Globus team made a decision to achieve a near-documentary feel to the proposed film. Utilizing a full-scale outdoor set consisting of control tower and terminal, the recreated Entebbe Airport also had a collection of realistic scale models of the Ugandan Air Force MiG-17 and MiG-21 fighters. Three of the four Hercules transports that were flown in the raid are seen in the film.

Operation Thunderbolt was produced with the co-operation of the Israeli Air Force and the Israeli government. The film features original footage of prominent politicians such as Yitzhak Rabin, Shimon Peres and Yigal Allon, although scenes with Peres being briefed by Yonatan Netanyahu's team and a hostage's father talking to Rabin feature a stand-in whose face is not seen. The exterior scenes set in Uganda were photographed near Eilat, Israel. Nearly all of the extras portraying Ugandan soldiers were played by Ethiopian Jewish immigrants. The scenes featuring the Knesset were filmed in Jerusalem, and the Tel Aviv airport sequences were filmed at Ben Gurion International Airport.

Originally filmed with all characters speaking in Hebrew, French, German, Arabic, or English per role, Operation Thunderbolt was shot a second time concurrently in an all-English version for the international market. With permission from the Globus Group, a number of documentaries on the rescue use footage from the film, alongside dramatizations of the events.

== Music ==
Dubi Zeltzer composed the film score. Yehoram Gaon performed the theme song, "Eretz Tzvi" (Land of the Deer) with lyrics by Talma Alyagon Raz. Like the film, "Eretz Tzvi" would become a famous song as well. In 2014, Gaon and Raz collaborated to make a new version of the song, with new lyrics inserted in honor of Roi Klein.

== Reception ==
Operation Thunderbolt was well received in its native Israel and was somewhat successful overseas. Of the three films that appeared in the 1970s (the others were American made-for-TV dramas Victory at Entebbe and Raid on Entebbe), Operation Thunderbolt was the most accurate with an authentic feel coming from the use of period-accurate uniforms, weapons, aircraft and vehicles. In 1978, the film was released theatrically in the UK, and in the same year, it was nominated for the Academy Award for Best Foreign Language Film.

== Home media ==
Although Operation Thunderbolt had some VHS releases over the years, Israeli video company SISU Home Entertainment released a special 25th anniversary two-disc DVD set of the movie in 2003. The set contains the movie with original multilingual audio and English subtitles on one disc and a 60-minute documentary about the raid on the other, plus a letter by Israeli Prime Minister Benjamin Netanyahu on his brother's role in the operation.

== Influence ==
Taito's Rail Shooter, by the same name as the film, which serves as the sequel to "Operation Wolf", has a similar plot which is loosely based on the film itself.

== See also ==
- Raid on Entebbe
- Victory at Entebbe
- 7 Days in Entebbe
- List of submissions to the 50th Academy Awards for Best Foreign Language Film
- List of Israeli submissions for the Academy Award for Best Foreign Language Film

== Bibliography ==
- Barron, Colin N. Planes on Film: Ten Favourite Aviation Films. Stirling, UK: Extremis Publishing, 2016. ISBN 978-0-9934-9326-3.
