= Raid on Entebbe =

Raid on Entebbe can refer to:

- Operation Entebbe, a military operation
- Raid on Entebbe (film), a film based on Operation Entebbe
