= Operation Yonatan =

Operation Yonatan may refer to:

- Entebbe raid, a 1976 Israeli counter-terrorist mission in Uganda
- Operation Thunderbolt (film), known in Israel as Mivtza Yonatan, a 1977 Israeli film about the raid
