= Mivtsa Yonatan =

Mivtsa Yonatan may refer to:

- Entebbe raid, or Operation Thunderbolt, in 1976
- Operation Thunderbolt (film), 1977, known in Israel as Mivtsa Yonatan
