= Brigitte Kuhlmann =

Founder of Revolutionary Cells (1947–1976)

- Born: 19 January 1947; Hannover, Occupied Germany
- Died: 4 July 1976 (aged 29); Entebbe, Uganda
- Organization: Revolutionary Cells (RZ)
- Known for: Air France Flight 139 hijacking

Brigitte Kuhlmann (19 January 1947 – 4 July 1976) was a German revolutionary who was a founding member of the West German left-wing revolutionary group Revolutionäre Zellen (RZ, or Revolutionary Cells in English). She was killed by the Israel Defense Forces in Entebbe, Uganda, during Operation Entebbe.

== Early life ==
Kuhlmann was born in 1947 and studied pedagogy in Hannover. She wrote poetry and cared for handicapped patients. She had relationships with Wilfried Böse and later Gerd-Hinrich Schnepel. She was described by acquaintances as "a feminist who enjoyed life but had a strong sense of social and pedagogical responsibility", "women’s lib, anti-authoritarian, resolute and honest", a "friendly, caring person with social commitment", "very kind, very caring … normally a soft person, but at the same time … very disciplined".

== Frankfurt underground ==
Kuhlmann and Böse eventually disappeared into the Frankfurt underground, socialising in left-wing circles where they were recruited into the Red Army Faction and were founding members of Revolutionary Cells. Although Revolutionary Cells had disagreements over strategy with the Red Army Faction, whom it viewed as too elitist, it felt an obligation to try to free their members after their arrests. This was especially true of Kuhlmann, who blamed herself for Ulrike Meinhof's arrest in 1972; she had recommended to her a safe house in Langenhagen, but the owner had become suspicious and called the police. This hope to be able to free their comrades was a key reason for the Revolutionary Cells' decision to join forces with the offshoot of the PFLP led by Wadie Haddad in the Air France 139 hijacking. Kuhlmann did not provide her lover and comrade-in-arms Schnepel with any details about the mission she was going on besides the fact that it was dangerous and that she would be gone for some time.

=== Air France 139 hijacking ===
During the Air France 139 hijacking, Kuhlmann and Böse used the noms de guerre "Halima" and "Mahmood", respectively. On 27 June 1976, using an Ecuadorian passport Kuhlmann originally boarded a flight in Bahrain along with Abdul-Rahim Jaber, and Jayel Naji al-Arjam en route to Athens, Greece to connect with an Air France flight. Baggage handlers at the airport in Bahrain ensured their firearms and grenades were smuggled onto the aircraft undetected in their carry-on luggage.

In Athens they transferred to the Air France aircraft, an Airbus A300 which took off for Paris as Flight 139 shortly after midday. Within minutes Kuhlmann and her accomplices hijacked the aircraft. Kuhlmann took control of the first class cabin and pistol-whipped noncompliant passengers. The airliner was re-routed to Libya under the call sign "Haifa One". After landing at Benina International Airport, where some passengers were released, the hijacked A300 took off again, headed south into Central Africa. During the five-hour flight, Kuhlmann verbally abused the passengers, with much of the abuse said to have been "antisemitic in nature". According to hostage Ilan Hartuv, she "yelled and acted like a Nazi" and he subsequently referred to her as a "Nazi terrorist". Schnepel has conjectured that the reason for this behaviour, which he considers to be very different from her usual conduct, might have been that she "felt that as a woman she had to be ‘tougher’", as well as the fact that she had been trained and instructed by Wadie Haddad to act in a distanced and unsentimental way towards hostages.

The aircraft landed at Entebbe, Uganda where Kuhlmann and her team were met by associates in the country, including a man identified by the press as Anton Degas Bouvier (but probably Fouad Awad), Abdel al-Latif, and Abu Ali. During the week-long standoff Kuhlmann and her associates made demands of Israel, including the release of Palestinian political prisoners, as well as a ransom from France. They also demanded the release of their allies Werner Hoppe, Jan-Carl Raspe, Ingrid Schubert, Ralf Reinders, Fritz Teufel, and Inge Viett. Israelis were separated from non-Israelis and the threat of execution was made if the demands were not met. The non-Israeli passengers were, as a rule, set free, and that included many Jews, with the hijackers explicitly having told the hostages that they were "not against the Jews, only against Israel". However, six Jewish passengers (two Brazilians, two Belgians and two Americans) had been included in the Israeli group, presumably because they had been seen wearing Jewish prayer shawls and reciting morning prayers or had generally associated with the Israelis on the plane and on the ground before the separation. When the hostages asked for the six to be moved back to the non-Israeli group, the two Brazilians were indeed transferred, but Kuhlmann refused to allow the other four to be set free.

=== Operation Entebbe ===
Kuhlmann, along with her fellow terrorist Wilfried Böse and the other hijackers, were killed in Operation Entebbe, the successful Israeli commando raid to free the remaining hostages. The two Germans died without firing a shot according to some sources. One reconstruction of the events has it that they were crouching to the left of the first Israeli commando to enter the room and were pointing their guns at him when a second one entered and killed them both in a barrage of automatic fire. According to another reconstruction, Böse threw a grenade at the soldiers, engaged in a shootout with the first commando and was killed in it, while the two killed by the second commando were Brigitte Kuhlmann and Faiz Jaber. According to hostage Ilan Hartuv's understanding of the event, Böse had fired at the soldiers and his Kalashnikov was still aimed at them when Hartuv saw his corpse.

=== Legacy ===
In the year after Kuhlmann's death, Lufthansa Flight 181 was hijacked by four militants of the PFLP, who called themselves "Commando Martyr Halima" in her honour. The demands were again to free far-left German prisoners as well as Palestinian ones. That operation also failed and was terminated by a West German commando raid.

== In popular culture ==
- Kuhlmann is portrayed by Austrian-born American actress Bibi Besch in the made-for-TV film Victory at Entebbe (1976). In the film, her character is credited as German Woman.
- Kuhlmann is played by Austrian actress Sybil Danning in the film Mivtsa Yonatan (1977; literally Operation Jonathan, called Operation Thunderbolt in English-speaking markets). In the film, her name is Halima.
- Kuhlmann is played by American actress Mariclare Costello in the made-for-TV film Raid on Entebbe (1977). Her character is named Gabrielle Krieger in the film.
- Kuhlmann is portrayed by Katharina Schüttler in Carlos (2010).
- Kuhlmann is portrayed by Rosamund Pike in Entebbe (2018, called 7 Days in Entebbe in Canada and the US).
