= List of synagogues in Uganda =

This is a list of notable synagogues in Uganda.

== Kampala ==
- Beit Ha'Am - Marom
- Kampala Jewish Synagogue

== Magada, Namutumba District ==
- Namutumba Synagogue

== Nabugoye ==
- Moses Synagogue

== Namanyonyi ==
- Namanyonyi Synagogue

== Nesenyi ==
- Nasenyi Synagogue

== Putti ==
Putti Synagogue

== See also ==
- Abayudaya
- History of the Jews in Uganda
