= Wilfried Böse =

Founder of Revolutionary Cells (1949–1976)

- Born: Ernst Wilfried Böse; 7 February 1949; Stuttgart, Württemberg-Baden, West Germany
- Died: 4 July 1976 (aged 27); Entebbe, Uganda
- Cause of death: Gunshot wounds
- Burial place: Jinja, Uganda
- Other name: "Boni"
- Organization: Revolutionäre Zellen
- Known for: Operation Entebbe †

Ernst Wilfried Böse (7 February 1949 – 4 July 1976) was a West German left-wing militant who co-founded the Revolutionäre Zellen. He carried out attacks in West Germany and in 1976 was involved in the hijacking of Air France Flight 139, dying in the resulting Israeli rescue operation.

== Life ==
Böse was born in the Bad Cannstatt borough of Stuttgart and raised in Bamberg, where he attended Dientzenhofer-Gymnasium. After graduating Platen-Gymnasium in 1968, he studied political science, psychology, and sociology, at University of Freiburg and Goethe University Frankfurt, dropping out both times after one semester. During the protests of 1968, he became involved in a wide range of left-wing groups and campaigns, including a Black Panther solidarity group. In 1970, he became the manager of Red Star (Roter Stern), a left-wing publishing house based in Frankfurt, founded by Sozialistischer Deutscher Studentenbund leader Karl Dietrich Wolff. During his employment there, he met his later compatriots Brigitte Kuhlmann, Johannes Weinrich, and Magdalena Kopp. Along with Weinrich and Micha Brumlik, Böse led a political activist group called Föderation Neue Linke. According to Brumlik, Böse was nicknamed "Boni" as an endearment of Saint Bonifatius, known as the Apostle of Germans, since the saint's birth name, Wynfreth/Winfried, was similar to Böse's baptismal name, Wilfried.

According to historian Wolfgang Kraushaar, Böse acted on behalf of the Red Army Faction before 1972, under the codename "the Little Fat One" ("der kleine Dicke") and may have also provided support for Black September's 1972 attack on the Israeli Olympic team.

When co-founding Revolutionäre Zellen in summer of 1972, Böse intended for the group to have decentralised leadership in order to make it more difficult for government agencies to track their actions. Along with Weinrich, Kuhlmann, Kopp, and Hans-Joachim Klein, he became active in the international wing of the RZ, undergoing guerilla training in South Yemen in 1975, where he took the nom de guerre "Mahmud". Böse and Brigitte Kuhlmann, who had become a romantic couple by this time, left their home in Frankfurt's Bornheim quarter on 20 September 1975, and committed themselves full-time to Revolutionäre Zellen and the Popular Front for the Liberation of Palestine. Böse assisted in the preparations for the 1975 OPEC siege led by Carlos the Jackal.

Ilan Hartuv, one of the surviving hostages in the hijacking of Air France Flight 139, recalled Böse saying to him during the hijacking that "I carried out terrorist acts in West Germany because the ruling establishment took Nazis and reactionaries into its service." Böse was known to have participated in two non-fatal bombings in Germany, one on 26 August 1974 at an Israeli travel agency and the other on 8 February 1976, targeting the office of Israel Bonds in Berlin.

== Hijacking of Air France Flight 139 ==
Böse was the initial leader of the 1976 hijacking of Air France Flight 139 from Tel Aviv, Israel to Paris, France via Athens, Greece. He and Kuhlmann were part of "Commando Guevara of Gaza", named after the nom de guerre of killed PFLP militant Mohammad al-Aswad. Directly after taking control of the cockpit at gunpoint with the other terrorists, Böse announced the hijacking over the plane's intercom, calling himself "Basil al-Kubaisy" and declaring that the plane was now named "Haifa", after the birthplace of fellow hijacker Fayez Abdul-Rahim al-Jaber. After diverting Air France Flight 139 to Entebbe, Uganda, Böse relinquished leadership to Al-Jaber, after which he and his fiancée separated the Israelis from the other passengers; the other passengers were allowed to go home.

During the hijacking, hostage Yitzhak David reportedly accused Böse of selection, showing the militant his Auschwitz tattoo and remarking, in German, that the post-war generation must not be different from the Nazis after all. Böse was taken aback and responded, "I'm no Nazi! ... I am an idealist", further saying that he was opposed to the West German government because they had allowed former Nazi officials to retain high-ranking government positions. Böse also accepted the decision of pilot Michel Bacos and his crew that they would not leave the airport in solidarity with the Israeli hostages. Böse was killed during Operation Entebbe. He received a state funeral by the government under Idi Amin and was buried alongside Kuhlmann at Jinja War Cemetery, 50 miles outside of Kampala.

According to hostage Ilan Hartuv, Böse was hesitant to shoot the hostages. He ordered them to take shelter when Israel Defense Forces commandos stormed the airport terminal where the hostages were being held. The hijacking of Air France Flight 139 resulted in the deaths of four Israeli hostages and 53 others, including Böse.

== Popular culture ==
Böse is played by Helmut Berger in the 1976 film Victory at Entebbe, by Klaus Kinski in Operation Thunderbolt (1977), by Horst Buchholz in Raid on Entebbe (1977), Aljoscha Stadelmann in Carlos (2010), and by Daniel Brühl in Entebbe (2018).
