= Raid on Entebbe (film) =

1977 American television movie

- Official release poster by John Solie
- Genre: Action; Drama; History
- Written by: Barry Beckerman
- Directed by: Irvin Kershner
- Starring: Peter Finch; Charles Bronson; Yaphet Kotto; Martin Balsam; Horst Buchholz; John Saxon; Sylvia Sidney; Jack Warden; Eddie Constantine; Mariclare Costello
- Music by: David Shire
- Country of origin: United States
- Original languages: English; German; French

Production
- Producers: Daniel H. Blatt; Edgar J. Scherick
- Production locations: Stockton Metropolitan Airport, Stockton, California
- Cinematography: Bill Butler
- Editors: Nick Archer; Bud S. Isaacs; Art Seid
- Running time: 150 minutes
- Production company: 20th Century Fox Television
- Budget: $3.5 million

Original release
- Network: NBC
- Release: January 9, 1977

Raid on Entebbe is a 1977 NBC television film directed by Irvin Kershner. It is based on the Entebbe raid, an Israeli military operation to liberate hostages at Entebbe Airport in Uganda, on July 4, 1976. The portrayal of Prime Minister Yitzhak Rabin was Peter Finch's final performance; he died five days after the film's release.

Raid on Entebbe portrays the discussions within the Israeli government, the military rescue of the hostages, and the controversy prompted by the rescue. It was one of three films made in the 1970s based on the Entebbe raid, Victory at Entebbe was rushed through production by ABC and broadcast one month earlier in December 1976. Operation Thunderbolt (1977, Israel) was the third A fourth film, Entebbe (titled 7 Days in Entebbe in the U.S.) was released over four decades later in 2018.

== Plot ==
On 27 June 1976, four terrorists belonging to a splinter faction of the Popular Front for the Liberation of Palestine under the orders of Wadie Haddad boarded and hijacked an Air France Airbus A300 at Athens. With President Idi Amin's approval, the terrorists divert the airliner and its hostages to Entebbe Airport in Uganda. After identifying Israeli passengers, the non-Jewish passengers are freed while a series of demands are made, including the release of 40 Palestinian guerrillas held in Israel, in exchange for the hostages.

The Cabinet of Israel, led by Prime Minister Yitzhak Rabin, unwilling to submit to terrorist demands, is faced with difficult decisions as their deliberations lead to a top-secret military raid. The difficult and daring commando operation, "Operation Thunderbolt", will be conducted over 2,500 miles (4,000 km) from home and will occur on the Jewish Sabbath.

While still negotiating with the terrorists, who now numbered seven individuals, including Palestinians and two radical left-wing Germans, the Israeli Army prepared four Lockheed C-130 Hercules transports for the raid. The commando force, led by Brig. Gen Dan Shomron, employed a ruse to overcome the terrorists and a large Ugandan army unit based near the airport. A black Mercedes limousine was carried on board and used to fool the terrorists and Ugandan sentries into thinking that it was President Amin's official car in which he was riding for an impromptu visit to the airport.

Nearly complete surprise was achieved but a skirmish resulted, ending with all seven terrorists and 45 Ugandan soldiers killed. The hostages were gathered together and most were quickly put on the idling C-130 aircraft. During the raid, one commando (the breach unit commander Yonatan Netanyahu, brother of future Prime Minister Benjamin Netanyahu), and three of the hostages, died. A fourth hostage, Dora Bloch, who had been taken to Mulago Hospital in Kampala, was murdered by the Ugandans on Idi Amin's orders.

With 102 hostages aboard and on their way to freedom, a group of Israeli commandos remained behind to destroy the Ugandan Air Force MiG-17 and MiG-21 fighters to prevent Ugandan retaliation. All the survivors of the commando force then joined in flying back to Israel via Nairobi (where they refueled with permission from the Kenyan government) and Sharm El Sheikh. (Note: The Jewish hymn sung on the aircraft by the commandos is "Hine ma tov.")

== Cast ==
- Peter Finch as Yitzhak Rabin
- Charles Bronson as Brig. Gen. Dan Shomron
- Yaphet Kotto as Idi Amin
- Martin Balsam as Daniel Cooper
- Horst Buchholz as Wilfried Böse
- John Saxon as Major General Benny Peled
- Sylvia Sidney as Dora Bloch
- Jack Warden as Lieut. Gen. Mordechai Gur
- Eddie Constantine as Captain Michel Bacos
- Mariclare Costello as Gabrielle Krieger
- Robert Loggia as Yigal Allon
- Tige Andrews as Shimon Peres
- David Opatoshu as Menachem Begin
- Allan Arbus as Eli Melnick
- James Woods as Captain Sammy Berg
- Harvey Lembeck as Mr. Harvey
- Dinah Manoff as Rachel Sager
- Kim Richards as Alice
- Aharon Ipalé as Major David Grut
- Larry Gelman as Mr. Berg
- Stephen Macht as Lieut. Col. Yonatan Netanyahu
- Meshach Richards as Major General Allon
- Pearl Shear as Mrs. Loeb

== Production ==
Raid on Entebbe was filmed entirely in the United States, with the Stockton Metropolitan Airport in Stockton, California, serving as both Entebbe Airport and an Israeli Air Force (IAF) base. Producers Blatt and Scherick turned to the "Hollywood Squadron", the 146th Airlift Wing of the California Air National Guard to provide three C-130 Hercules transports. Scenes were also shot at the Van Nuys Military airport, Los Angeles; these included footage of passenger jets, and the interior of a C-130 in which Bronson made his speech to the team about to attack Entebbe.

The C-130E used by the Israeli Air Force was the same version flown by the 146th Air Wing. The camouflage scheme used by both the United States Air Force and IAF was virtually identical, and with the overpainting of Israeli markings, the Hercules transports became both "set dressing" for an Israeli airfield and as the aircraft used in the raid on Entebbe. The 146th Airlift Wing also supplied all the military equipment, such as M151 jeeps and weapons that would be seen at an active base.

Other aircraft used in Raid on Entebbe include an Airbus A300B2 F-BVGA (seen in archive footage); a Boeing 707, two Douglas DC-8-31s, 10 North American F-86 Sabre (1/2 scale models representing the Ugandan Air Force MiGs), North American FJ-3 Fury and Bell UH-1 Iroquois helicopter.

Principal photography on Raid on Entebbe took place in November 1976, with the training for the raid that took place using a replica of the Entebbe Airport. The actual airport had been built by an Israeli construction company and their involvement led to an accurate mockup being built to test out tactics devised for the raid.

== Reception ==
=== Critical response ===
Raid on Entebbe received initially good reviews. Capitalizing on its strong all-star ensemble cast, a film version was released theatrically in the UK and Europe in early 1977.

In May 1977, local Thai authorities banned the film from being shown in Thailand. They argued it presented a one-sided image of the Middle East conflict and posed a risk to the nation's relations with Arab states.

=== Accolades ===
Award	Category	Nominee(s)	Result	Ref.
Golden Globe Awards	Best Motion Picture – Made for Television		Won	
Primetime Emmy Awards	Outstanding Special – Drama or Comedy	Daniel H. Blatt and Edgar J. Scherick	Nominated	
Primetime Emmy Awards	Outstanding Lead Actor in a Special Program – Drama or Comedy	Peter Finch (posthumous nomination)	Nominated	
Primetime Emmy Awards	Outstanding Performance by a Supporting Actor in a Comedy or Drama Special	Martin Balsam	Nominated	
Primetime Emmy Awards	Outstanding Performance by a Supporting Actor in a Comedy or Drama Special	Yaphet Kotto	Nominated	
Primetime Emmy Awards	Outstanding Directing in a Special Program – Drama or Comedy	Irvin Kershner	Nominated	
Primetime Emmy Awards	Outstanding Writing in a Special Program – Drama or Comedy – Original Teleplay	Barry Beckerman	Nominated	
Primetime Emmy Awards	Outstanding Cinematography in Entertainment Programming for a Special	Wilmer C. Butler	Won	
Primetime Emmy Awards	Outstanding Achievement in Film Sound Editing for a Special	Milton C. Burrow, Gene Eliot, Don Ernst, Tony Garber, Don V. Isaacs, Larry Kaufman, William L. Manger, A. David Marshall, Richard Oswald, Bernard F. Pincus, Edward Sandlin and Russ Tinsley	Won	
Primetime Emmy Awards	Outstanding Achievement in Music Composition for a Special (Dramatic Underscore)	David Shire	Nominated	
Primetime Emmy Awards	Outstanding Achievement in Video Tape Editing for a Special	Bud S. Isaacs, Art Seid and Nick Archer	Nominated	

== See also ==
- Operation Thunderbolt
- Victory at Entebbe
- 7 Days in Entebbe
