= Johannes Weinrich =

Left-wing German terrorist

- Born: 21 July 1947 (age 79)
- Education: University of Frankfurt
- Organization: Revolutionary Cells (RZ)

Johannes Weinrich (born 21 July 1947) is a German left-wing terrorist and a founder of the Revolutionary Cells (RZ). He later became a close aide to Carlos the Jackal. He is currently serving a life sentence for murder.

== Biography ==
=== Early life ===
Weinrich attended the University of Frankfurt, where he was a radical student leader and owned a bookstore. He was friends with fellow radical Wilfried Böse.

=== Career ===
Weinrich is thought to have managed operations for "Carlos" — Ilich Ramírez Sánchez — in Europe during the 1970s and '80s. In 1975 Weinrich and Carlos attempted to hit an Israeli airplane at Orly Airport with two RPG-7 rocket launchers. The rockets missed and hit an empty plane and a building instead. He was imprisoned for providing the cars used in the attack, but was released on probation for health reasons eight months into his sentence and became a fugitive. In the late 1970s he introduced Carlos to Magdalena Kopp, at the time Weinrich's girlfriend, whom Carlos would marry in 1979.

=== Extradition and conviction ===
On 1 June 1995, Weinrich was arrested in Yemen and extradited to Germany. At the time he was carrying a Somali passport identifying him as John Saleh. He faced trial for the 1975 rocket-propelled grenade attacks on El Al flights, 1981 bombing of Radio Free Europe in Munich, 1983 attack on the Saudi Ambassador to Greece, and the bombing of the French cultural centre in West Berlin the same year. He was convicted in 2000 and sentenced to life imprisonment.

== In popular culture ==
Weinrich is portrayed by Alexander Scheer in the 2010 French-German television mini-series Carlos.
