= Benny Peled =

Israeli Air Force general (1928–2002)

Benjamin "Benny" Peled
- בני פלד
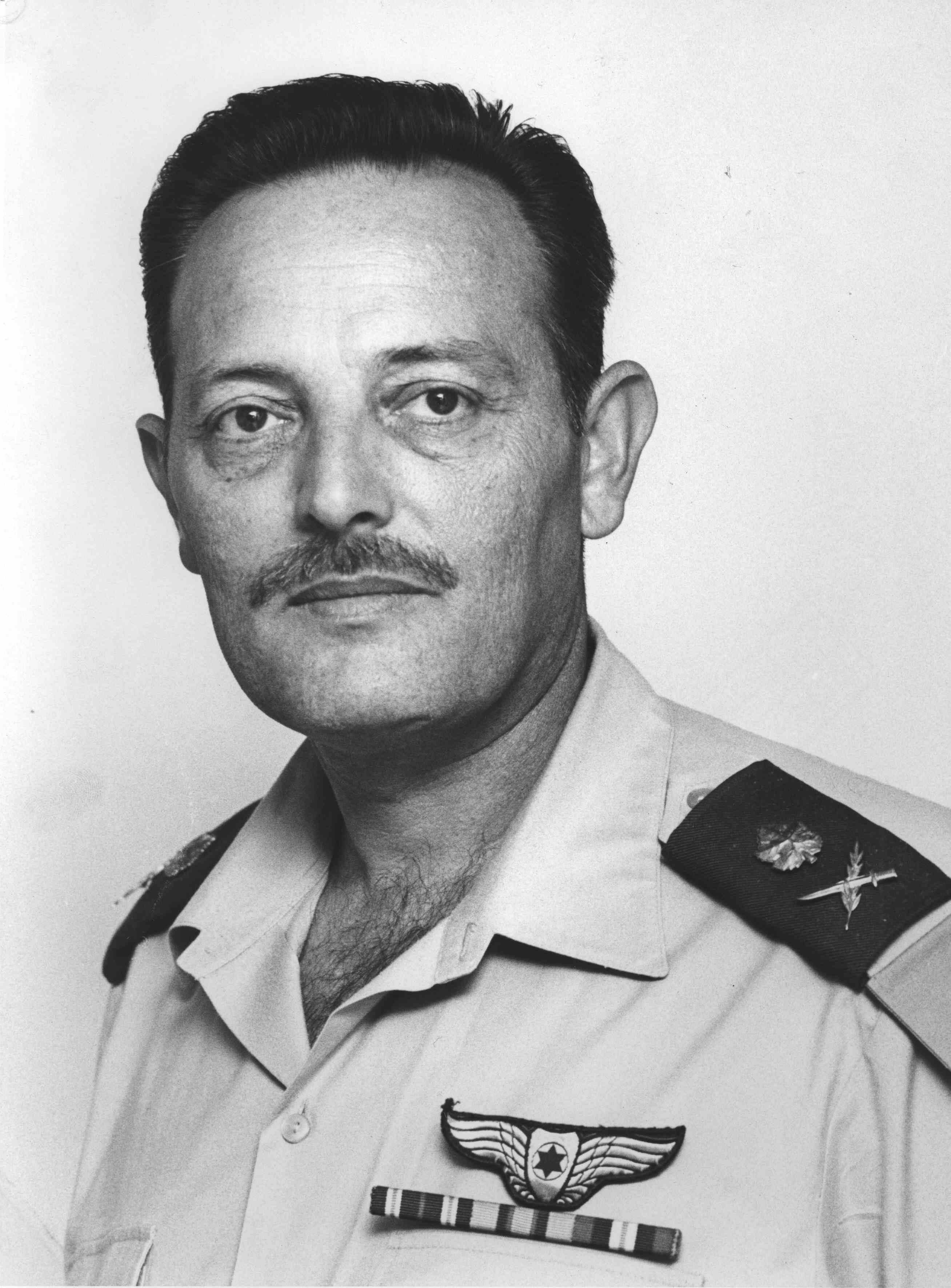
- Benny Peled
- Born: Binyamin Weidenfeld; April 18, 1928; Tel Aviv, Mandatory Palestine
- Died: July 13, 2002 (aged 74); Ramat HaSharon, Israel
- Military career
- Allegiance: Israel
- Branch: Israeli Air Force
- Service years: 1948–1977
- Rank: Aluf
- Commands: Israel Air Force, Hatzor Airbase
- Conflicts: 1948 Arab-Israeli War, Suez Crisis, Six-Day War, Yom Kippur War, Operation Entebbe
- Other work: President of Elbit Systems

Benny Peled (Hebrew: בני פלד; April 18, 1928 – July 13, 2002) was the commander of the Israeli Air Force during the Yom Kippur War and Operation Entebbe. He retired with the rank of Aluf (major general).

== Biography and career ==
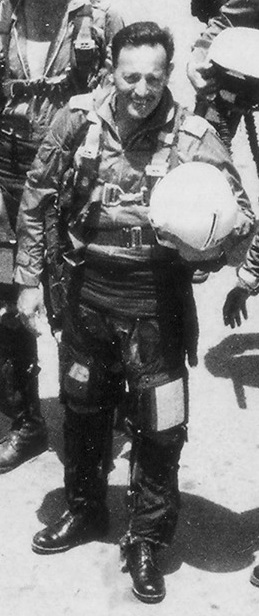
Peled in May 1973

He was born Binyamin Weidenfeld in Tel Aviv, Mandatory Palestine, and Hebraized his name to Peled. His father, Arie Weidenfeld, was a member of a family who came to Israel during the First Aliya from Romania and settled in Rosh Pinna. His father worked in the public works department of the British mandate government and was responsible, among other things, for building airfields. His mother, Yona Weidenfeld (né Gurfinkel), came from Poland in 1925. Peled was the eldest son and had a younger brother and sister.

Peled studied in Gymnasia Herzelia and his teachers included Shaul Tchernichovsky, Yehuda Burla and Zvi Nishri, who educated him in the spirit of Zionism and democracy. He served in the Jewish Settlement Police as a teenager and joined the Haganah. He also studied mechanical engineering at the Technion. In early 1948, he joined Sherut Avir, the Haganah's air service and forerunner of the Israeli Air Force, and completed an aircraft mechanic's course. During the 1948 Arab–Israeli War he assembled the first Messerschmitt Bf 109 which had arrived in Israel dismantled. In 1949, he volunteered for the Israeli Air Force Flight Academy and graduated from its second class. He then served as a Spitfire and P-51 Mustang fighter pilot.

Peled was one of the pioneers of the jet age in the IAF. He was one of the first Israeli fighter pilots selected to fly the Meteor. He commanded the first Meteor, Ouragan and Mystère squadrons. In 1956 Peled participated in Operation Kadesh, the Suez campaign, in which his Mystere jet was shot down by Egyptian anti-aircraft fire and he became the first Israeli pilot to use an ejector seat. He was rescued by an IAF Piper light aircraft.

Peled was a base commander during the 1967 Six-Day War. He became commander of the IAF in 1973 when he was 45 years old. In that capacity he led the Israeli Air Force in the Yom Kippur War, successfully overcoming early setbacks. In July 1976 he planned and executed the air component of Operation Entebbe, the planned rescue of hostages held by terrorist hijackers in Entebbe, Uganda.

In 1978, Peled became the president of Elbit Systems, a position he held until 1985.

== In popular culture ==
Peled was played by John Saxon in the film Raid on Entebbe (1977).

== Death ==
On July 13, 2002 Peled died at his home in Ramat HaSharon at age 74 from a severe lung disease caused by smoking. On his last day, he said goodbye to his family and made a dying wish, asking that upon his death they would take the bell which he had received for his service as the commander of the Air Force, go outside, and announce to the world, while ringing the bell, "A crazy man who thought that the Jews were capable of establishing a state has just died."

He was buried in the military section of the Kiryat Shaul Cemetery.
