= Michel Bacos =

French pilot (1924–2019)

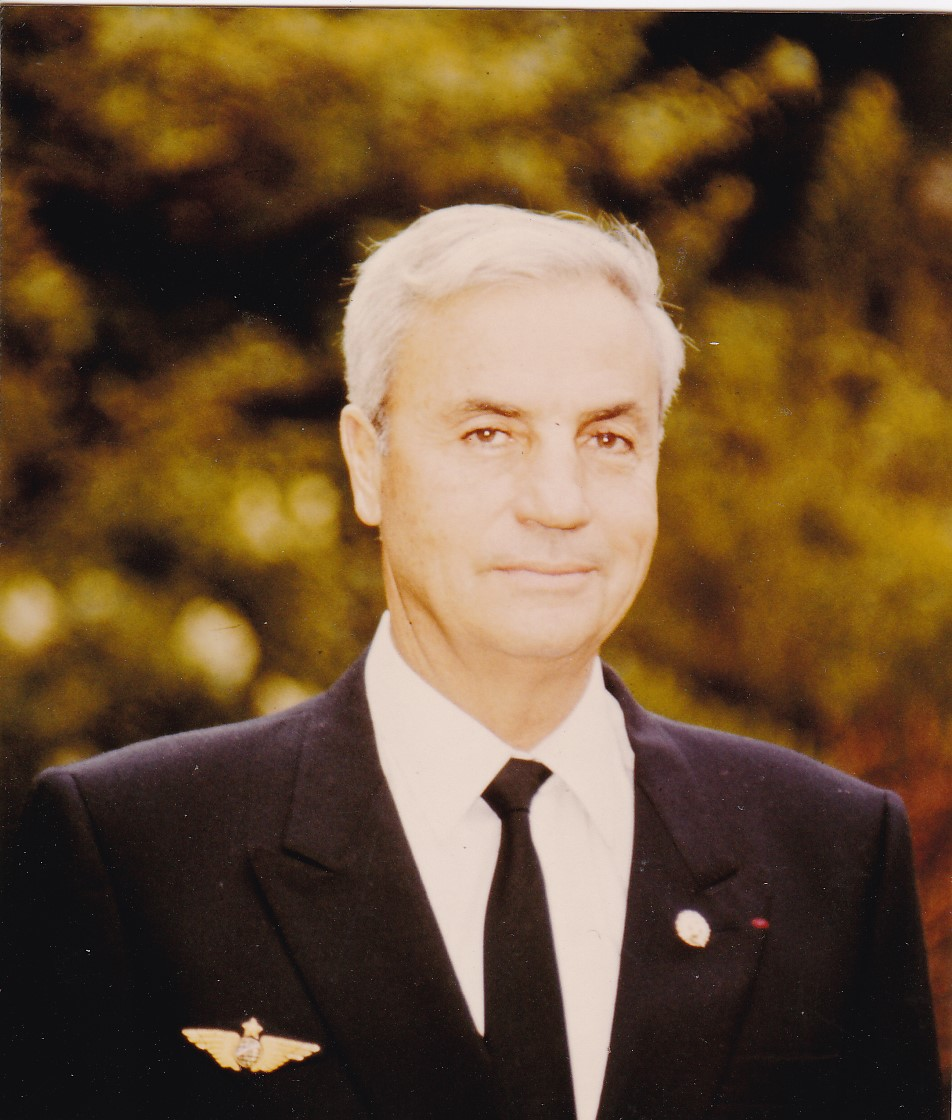
- Born: 3 May 1924; Port Saïd, Egypt
- Died: 26 March 2019 (aged 94); Nice, France
- Occupation: Airline pilot
- Employer: Air France
- Known for: Pilot involved in Entebbe hijacking
- Title: Captain
- Awards: National Order of the Legion of Honour DPLV; B'nai B'rith International "Ménoras d'Or" (Golden Menorah); American Jewish Congress Moral Courage Award

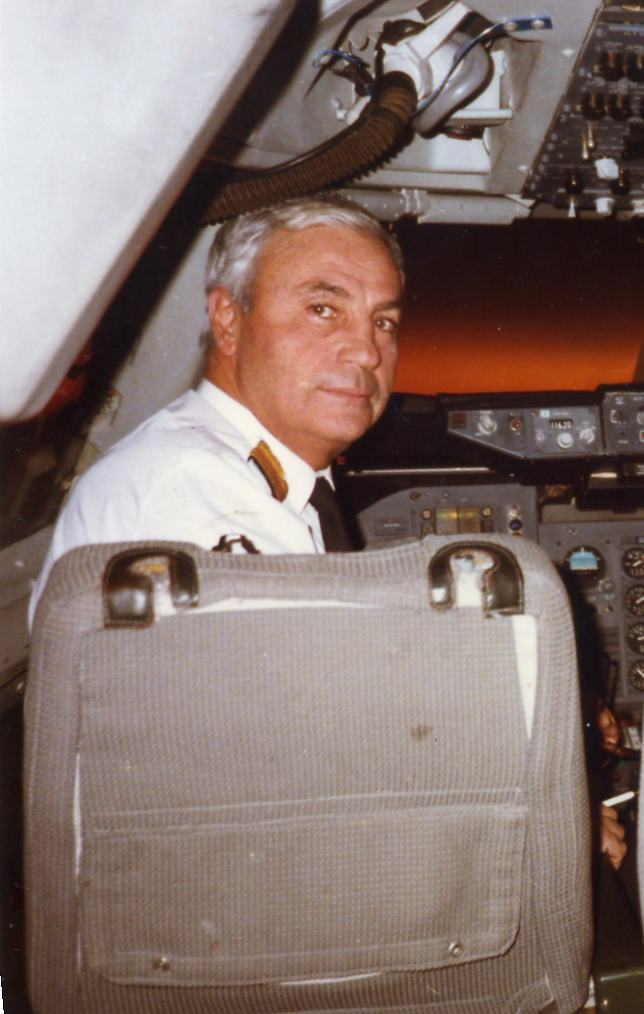
Captain Michel Bacos

Michel Bacos (3 May 1924 – 26 March 2019) was a French airline pilot. He was the captain of Air France Flight 139 when it was hijacked on 27 June 1976 by terrorists belonging to the German Revolutionary Cells (RZ) and the Palestinian Popular Front for the Liberation of Palestine – External Operations (PFLP-EO). The hijacking was part of an international campaign of Palestinian terrorism.

Bacos was a recipient of the National Order of the Legion of Honour, the highest decoration in France. He was also awarded a medal by the Israeli government for refusing to leave his Jewish passengers behind when the terrorists released their non-Jewish hostages and offered to release Bacos and his crew.

== Life and career before Entebbe ==
Michel Bacos grew up in Port Said, Egypt, where his father worked as a lawyer at the Suez Canal. At the age of seventeen, he joined the Free French Forces of General de Gaulle and, in 1943, joined the Free French Naval Forces.

He was sent to Naval Air Station Corpus Christi in Texas where he became a naval aviation pilot.

In 1955, he joined Air France as a pilot. This is where he met his wife, Rosemarie, a German, who was then a stewardess.

== Hijacking ==
On 27 June 1976, Bacos was piloting an Airbus A300 flight from Athens to Paris, originating in Tel Aviv. Minutes into the flight, Bacos heard screams and quickly realized that the plane was being hijacked. Bacos was forced at gunpoint to re-route the plane. He recalled later: "The terrorist had his gun pointed continuously at my head and occasionally he would poke my neck not to look at him. We could only obey the orders of the terrorists." Bacos was forced to turn the plane south to Benghazi, Libya, for refueling, and then to fly in a south-eastern direction. He landed the jet at Entebbe, Uganda, with only 20 minutes' fuel left.

The terrorists freed the 148 non-Jewish passengers, and offered to release Bacos and his crew. They felt duty-bound to remain on the plane, and refused to leave. They stayed behind with the Jewish hostages. The captives were freed in an Israeli commando raid known as Operation Entebbe, and Bacos was dazed in the attack. After the hijacking, Bacos took a two-week holiday and requested that his first flight back be to Israel.

== Awards and later life ==
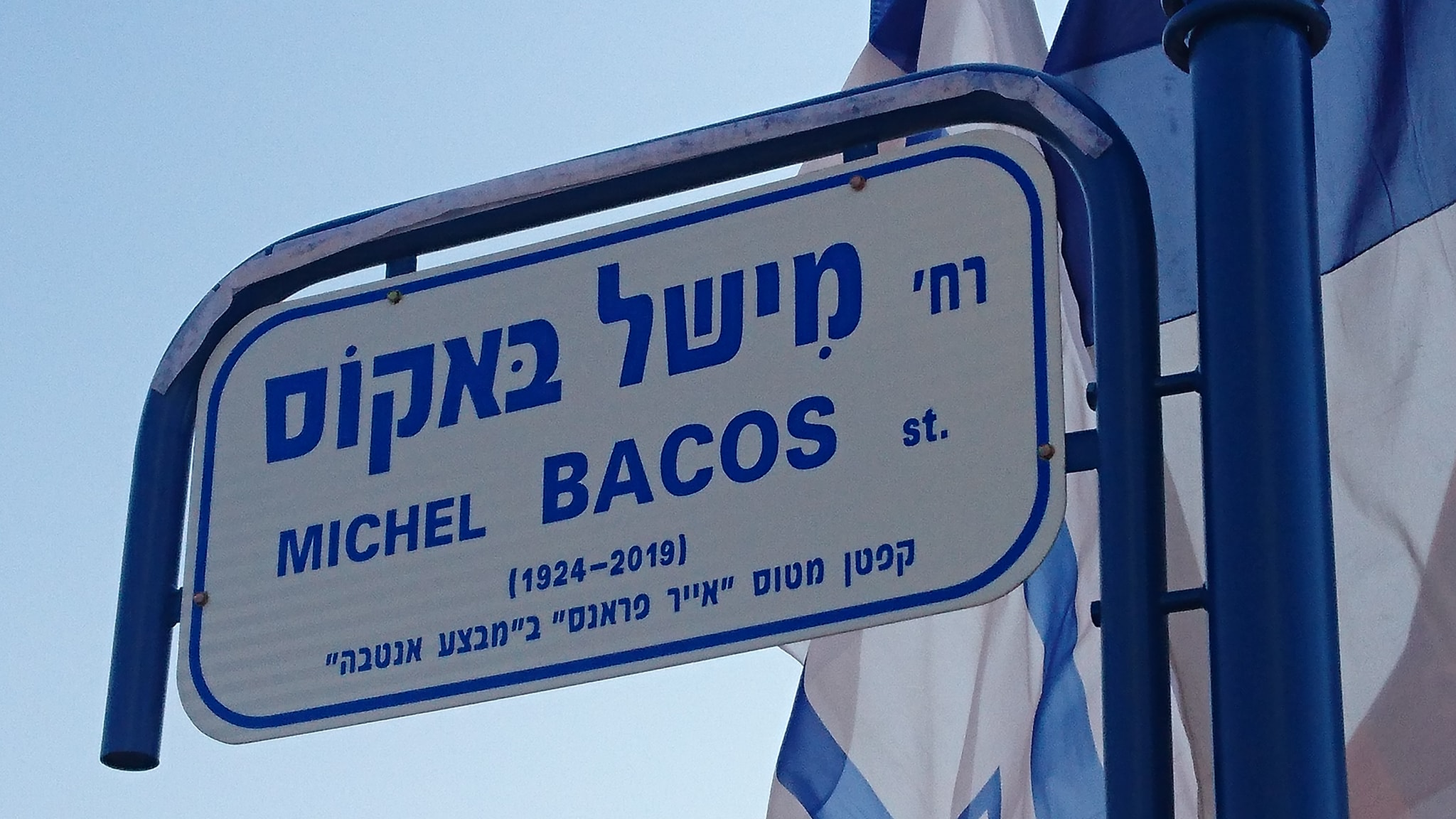
Street sign named after Bacos in Netanya, Israel

In 1976, Bacos was awarded the National Order of the Legion of Honour, the highest decoration in France, by President Valéry Giscard d'Estaing. The Israeli government awarded Bacos and his crew medals for heroism, for refusing to leave the Jewish passengers behind. In June 2008, Bacos was awarded the B'nai B'rith International "Ménoras d'Or" (Golden Menorah) in Cannes, France.

Bacos retired from Air France in 1982, and resided in Nice, France, with his wife. They had seven grandchildren. In 2016, the American Jewish Congress awarded Bacos the organization's Moral Courage Award. Bacos lived in Nice at the time of his death on 26 March 2019. The Israeli National Anthem, "Hatikvah", was played at his funeral. Nice Mayor Christian Estrosi recognized Bacos, saying: "Michel, bravely refusing to give in to anti-Semitism and barbarism, did honor to France. The love of France and the defense of liberties have marked his destiny."

A street was named after Bacos in Netanya, Israel.

== Films ==
Bacos appeared as himself in the 2000 documentary film Operation Thunderbolt: Entebbe. He is also depicted in:

- Mivtsa Yonatan (1977; played by Henri Czarniak)
- Raid on Entebbe (1977; played by Eddie Constantine)
- 7 Days in Entebbe (2018; played by Brontis Jodorowsky)

== Gallery ==
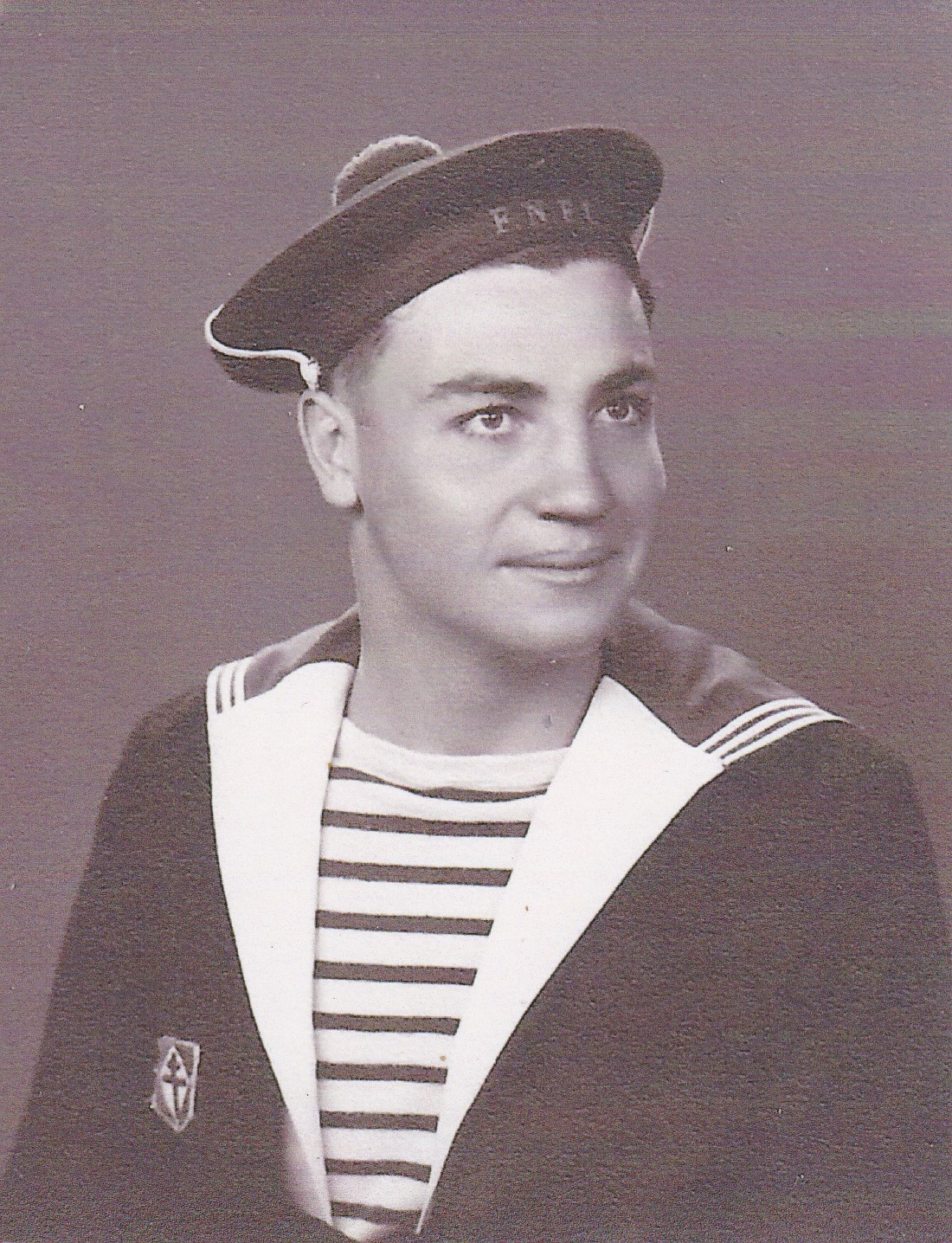
Michel Bacos FNFL

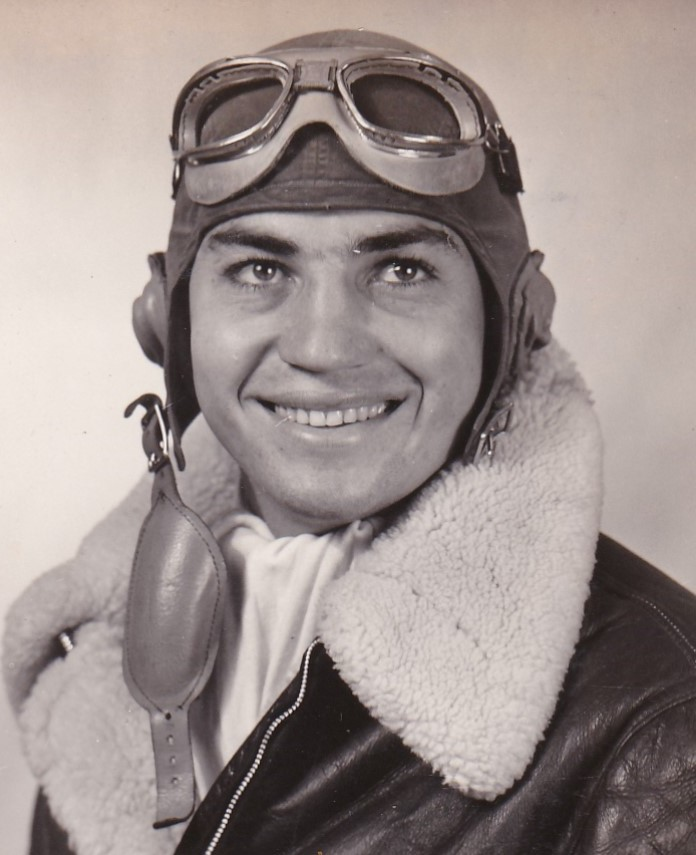
Michel Bacos Corpus Christi Texas
