= OPEC siege =

1975 hostage crisis in Vienna, Austria

OPEC Siege
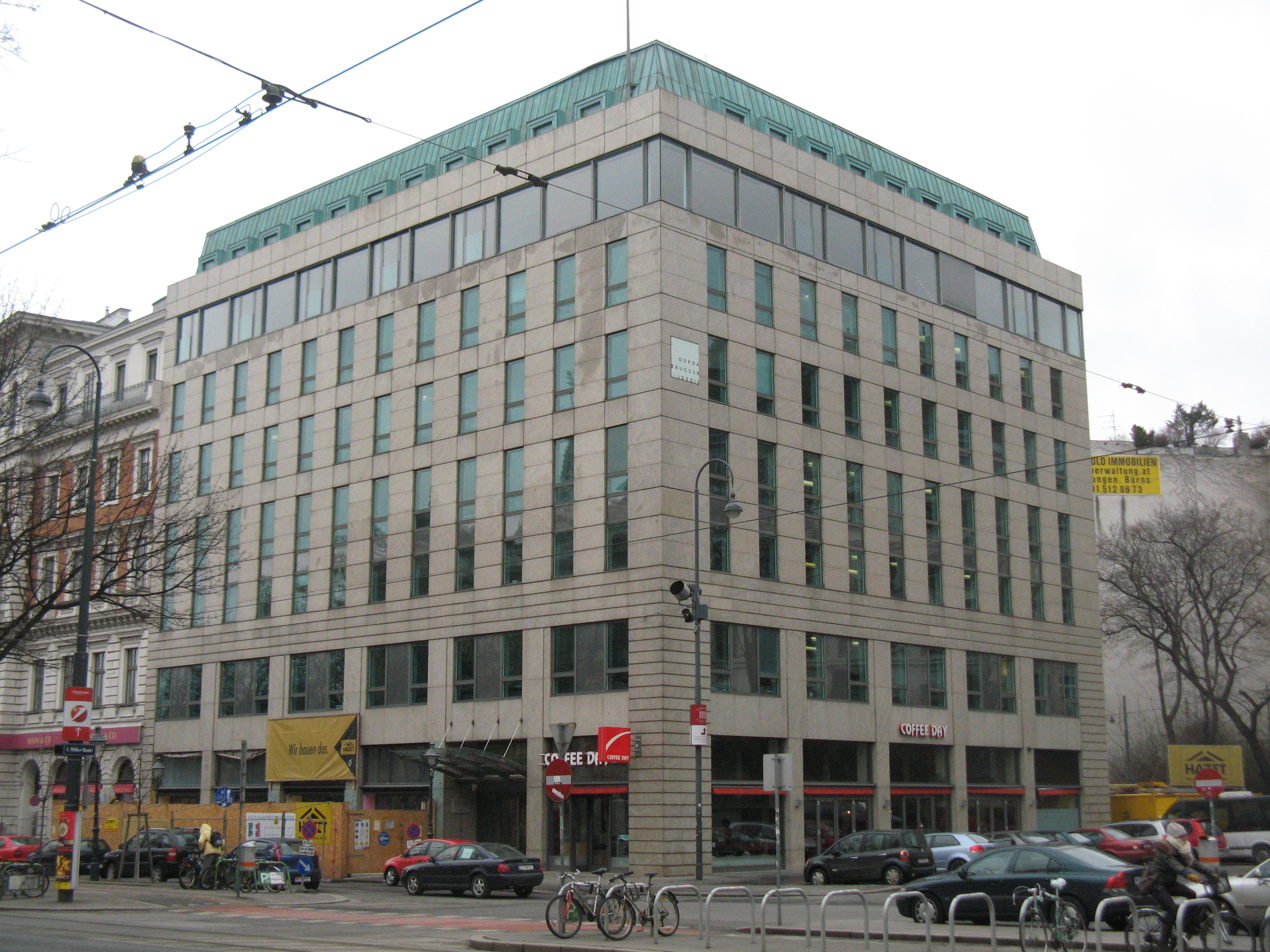
- Dr. Karl Lueger-Ring 10 in 2011.
- Location: Vienna; Algiers; Tripoli
- Date: 21 December 1975 – 23 December 1975
- Target: OPEC
- Attack type: Terrorist attack and hostage crisis
- Weapons: Firearms and hand grenades
- Deaths: 3
- Perpetrator: Arm of the Arab Revolution / Popular Front for the Liberation of Palestine
- Motive: Publicity of Palestinian issues and ransom

On 21 December 1975, six militants attacked the semi-annual meeting of OPEC leaders in Vienna, Austria; they took more than 60 hostages after killing an Austrian policeman, an Iraqi OPEC security officer, and a Libyan economist. Several other individuals were wounded. The self-named "Arm of the Arab Revolution" group was led by Carlos the Jackal. The siege resulted in complex diplomatic negotiations. It ended two days later, after flights to Algiers and Tripoli, with all hostages released and all militants escaping. The fact that this was one of the first times that Arab states were targeted by a terrorist attack prompted them to aid in developing antiterrorism efforts at the United Nations.

== Background ==
At his trial in 2000, the former militant Hans-Joachim Klein revealed that information about the security measures at the conference and the weapons came from the government of Libya. This support was necessary for the launch of the raid.

== Siege ==
The path taken by the attackers inside OPEC headquarters

On 21 December 1975, Saudi Arabian Minister of Petroleum Ahmed Zaki Yamani and the other oil ministers of the members of OPEC were taken hostage in Vienna, Austria, where the ministers were attending a meeting at the OPEC headquarters at Dr-Karl-Lueger-Ring 10 (renamed Universitätsring in 2012). The hostage attack was orchestrated by a six-person team led by Venezuelan militant Carlos the Jackal (which included two West Germans Gabriele Kröcher-Tiedemann, Hans-Joachim Klein, Lebanese Anis al-Naqqash and Syrian Kamal Kheir Beik). The self-named "Arm of the Arab Revolution" group called for the liberation of Palestine. Carlos planned to take over the conference by force and kidnap all eleven oil ministers in attendance and hold them for ransom, with the exception of Ahmed Zaki Yamani and Iran's oil minister Jamshid Amuzegar, who were to be executed.

Carlos led his team past two Austrian police officers in the building's lobby and up to the first floor, where a police officer, an Iraqi plainclothes security guard and a young Libyan economist, Yusuf al-Azmarly, were shot dead.

As Carlos entered the conference room and fired shots into the ceiling, the delegates ducked under the table. The militants searched for Ahmed Zaki Yamani and then divided the sixty-three hostages into groups. Delegates of friendly countries were moved toward the door, 'neutrals' were placed in the centre of the room and the 'enemies' were placed along the back wall, next to a stack of explosives.

This last group included delegates from Saudi Arabia, Iran, Qatar, and the United Arab Emirates. Carlos demanded that a bus be provided to take his group and the hostages to the airport, where a DC-9 airplane and crew would be waiting. In the meantime, Carlos briefed Yamani on his plan to eventually fly to Aden, South Yemen where Yamani and Amuzegar would be killed. During the attack Hans-Joachim Klein was shot and injured; however, Carlos refused to leave him behind and demanded medical assistance. Kurdish-born doctor Wiriya Rawenduzy, who was living and working in Vienna, volunteered to accompany the militants on board in exchange for the hostages' safe release upon arrival.

Carlos threatened the execution of a hostage every 15 minutes and demanded that the Austrian authorities read a communiqué about the Palestinian cause on Austrian radio and television networks every two hours. To avoid the executions, the Austrian government agreed and the communiqué was broadcast as requested. The communiqué was written in French and demanded that the Arab world wage a "total liberation war". As requested, a bus was provided the following morning at 6:40 and 42 hostages were boarded and taken to Vienna International Airport. The Viennese police said that 96 hostages were taken during the siege, though around 50 hostages resident in Vienna were freed.

== Flight ==
An Austrian Airlines DC-9 was provided for the group and was airborne just after 9:00, with explosives placed under Yamani's seat. The plane first stopped in Algiers, where Carlos left the plane to meet with the Algerian Foreign minister Abdelaziz Bouteflika. Five oil ministers and 31 other hostages were released, while five oil ministers remained captive.

The refueled plane left for Tripoli, where there was trouble in acquiring another plane as had been planned. Carlos decided to instead return to Algiers and change to a Boeing 707, a plane large enough to fly to Baghdad nonstop. Ten more hostages were released before leaving.

With only ten hostages remaining, the Boeing 707 left for Algiers and arrived at 3:40 a.m. After leaving the plane to meet with the Algerians, Carlos talked with his colleagues in the front cabin of the plane and then told Yamani and Amuzegar that they would be released at mid-day. Carlos was then called from the plane a second time and returned after two hours.

At this second meeting it is believed that Carlos held a phone conversation with Algerian President Houari Boumédienne, who informed Carlos that the oil ministers' deaths would result in an attack on the plane. Yamani's biography suggests that the Algerians had used a covert listening device on the front of the aircraft to overhear the earlier conversation between the militants, and found that Carlos had in fact still planned to murder the two oil ministers. Boumédienne must also have offered Carlos asylum at this time and possibly financial compensation for failing to complete his assignment.

On returning to the plane, Carlos stood before Yamani and Amuzegar and expressed his regret at not being able to murder them. He then told the hostages that he and his comrades would leave the plane, after which they would all be free. After waiting for the militants to leave, Yamani and the other nine hostages followed and were taken to the airport by Algerian Foreign Minister Abdelaziz Bouteflika. The militants were present in the next lounge and Khalid (Anis al-Naqqash), the Palestinian, asked to speak to Yamani. As his hand reached for his coat, Khalid was surrounded by guards and a gun was found concealed in a holster. All the hostages and militants walked away from the situation, two days after it began.

== Aftermath ==
In the years following the OPEC raid, Carlos's accomplices revealed that the operation was commanded by Wadie Haddad, a founder of the Popular Front for the Liberation of Palestine. They also claimed that the idea and funding came from an Arab president, widely thought to be Libya's Muammar al-Gaddafi. Fellow militants Bassam Abu Sharif and Klein claimed that Carlos received and kept a ransom between US$20 million and US$50 million from "an Arab president". Carlos claimed that Saudi Arabia paid ransom on behalf of Iran, but that the money was "diverted en route and lost by the Revolution". He was finally captured in 1994 in Khartoum, Sudan, and is serving life sentences for at least 16 other murders.

== In popular culture ==
=== Films ===
The 1997 film The Assignment depicts the OPEC siege early in the film.

The 2010 Olivier Assayas-directed series Carlos documented the life of Ramírez Sánchez. The film won a Golden Globe Award for Best Miniseries or Television Movie. Carlos was played by the Venezuelan actor Édgar Ramírez.
