= Wadie Haddad =

Palestinian PFLP militant and KGB agent (1927–1978)

- وديع حداد
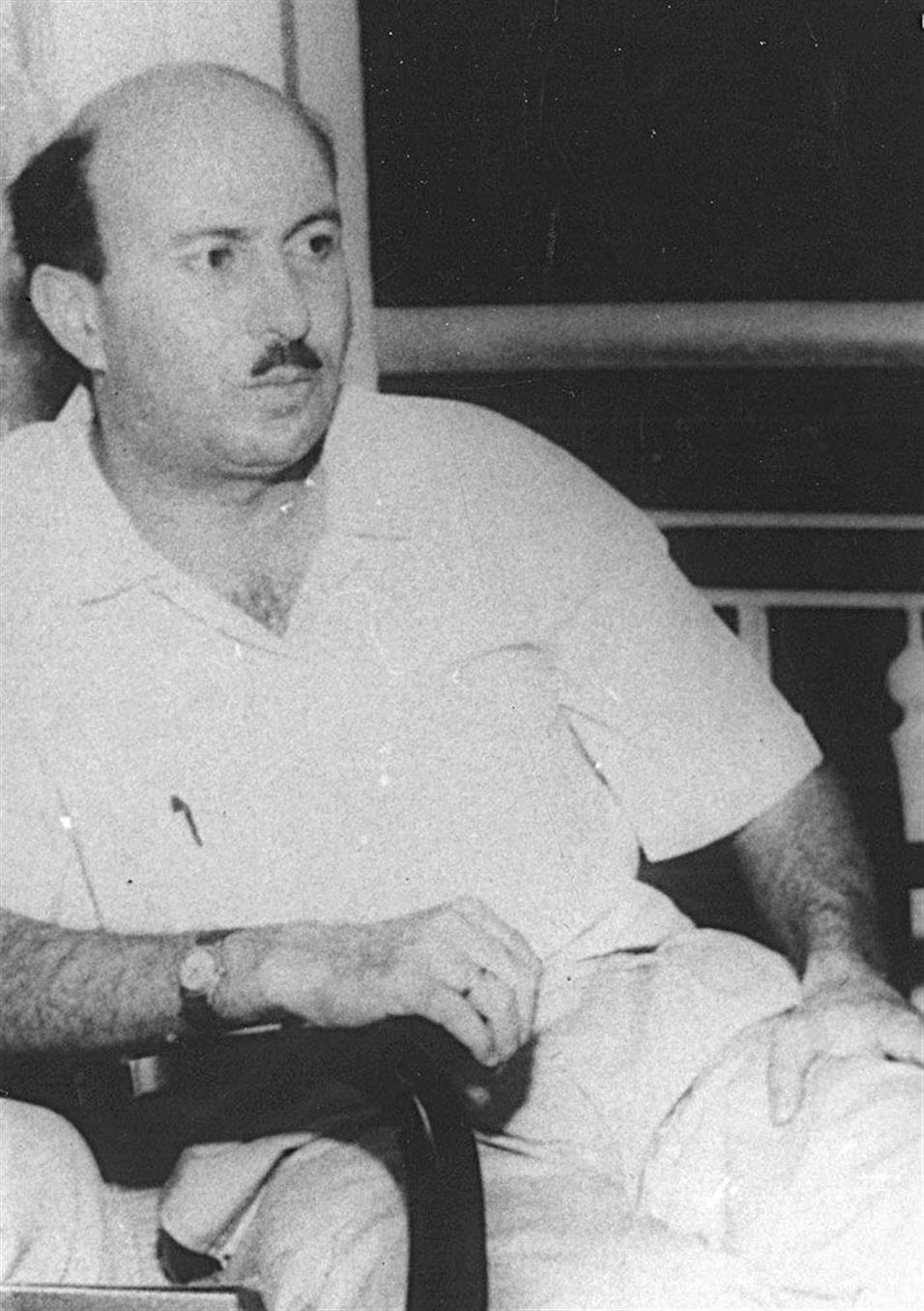
- Haddad in Syria, c. 1970
- Born: 1927; Safed, British Mandate for Palestine
- Died: 28 March 1978 (aged 50–51); East Berlin, German Democratic Republic
- Other name: Abu Hani
- Education: American University of Beirut
- Years active: 1951–1978
- Organization: PFLP–EO

Wadie Haddad (Arabic: وديع حداد; 1927 – 28 March 1978), also known by the kunya Abu Hani (أبو هاني), was a Palestinian militant and founding leader of the Popular Front for the Liberation of Palestine (PFLP) who later split to form the Popular Front for the Liberation of Palestine – External Operations (PFLP–EO). Haddad organized several hijackings of international civilian passenger aircraft in the 1960s and 1970s.

== Early life and education ==
Haddad was born into a family of Palestinian Christians (Greek Orthodox) in the city of Safed in 1927. His home was destroyed during the 1948 Arab–Israeli War, prompting him to flee to Lebanon as a Palestinian refugee. He received a degree in medicine from the American University of Beirut, where he met fellow Palestinian refugee George Habash, who was also a medical student. Together, they helped found the Arab Nationalist Movement (ANM), a political organization of pan-Arabists who sought to dismantle Israel and unite the world's Arab countries. Haddad became a leading member of the organisation.

After graduating, he relocated with Habash to Amman, Jordan, where they established a medical clinic. He worked with the United Nations Relief and Works Agency for Palestine Refugees in 1956 but was arrested by Jordanian authorities in the following year due to his nationalist activities. In 1961, he managed to escape to Syria. In 1962 he was one of 60 ANM members trained at the Egyptian commando school at Inshas. Haddad became a proponent of the armed struggle against Israel and succeeded in militarizing the ANM.

== Connections with militant and political groups ==
=== Relationship with the PFLP ===
The ANM was one of the groups that came together to found the Popular Front for the Liberation of Palestine (PFLP) in late 1967. Haddad oversaw its Special Apparatus, which was responsible for so-called external operations—attacks conducted outside the borders of historic Palestine. Haddad planned the first ever act of modern air terrorism, which the PFLP executed on 23 July 1968, hijacking an El-Al flight from Rome to Lod airport and redirecting it to Algeria. Negotiations lasted 39 days. Haddad organized another hijacking in August 1969, when PFLP militants led by Leila Khaled diverted a TWA flight from Rome to Damascus. The Dawson's Field hijackings, the simultaneous hijacking of multiple flights organised by Haddad, provoked the Black September crackdown on the Palestine Liberation Organization (PLO) in Jordan. Haddad was extensively criticised, especially by the organisation's left. At a central committee meeting in early November 1970, the PFLP publicly agreed to suspend external operations in general and the tactic of airplane hijacking specifically.

Haddad was later instructed to brief the whole PFLP leadership before conducting further external operations, but he refused to do so, saying that he would liaise only with George Habash, and to a lesser extent with three other senior figures. Haddad paused hijackings for more than a year, but defied the moratorium by organising the hijacking of Lufthansa Flight 649 in February 1972. In reaction, the PFLP's third general conference on 7 March 1972 voted to dissolve the Special Apparatus and expel Haddad. Haddad continued to be friendly with Habash, however, and channeled substantial funds to the PFLP over the following three years.

In June 1976, Haddad organized the hijacking and redirection of Air France Flight 139 to Entebbe, Uganda. He planned to hold the flight's Israeli and Jewish passengers hostage to promote Palestinian nationalism and secure the release of internationally held Palestinian prisoners. The operation's failure following the Israeli commando raid led to the PFLP publicly expelling and severing ties with Haddad. The CIA believed that Haddad's expulsion was a publicity stunt designed to create plausible deniability about PFLP—and perhaps PLO—involvement in Haddad's terrorism. It is notable that, despite poor public relations between the PFLP and Haddad, the PFLP fully funded and organized Haddad's large funeral procession in 1978. Leila Khaled also stated that Haddad maintained consistent relationships with some PFLP members until his death.

=== Relationship with other groups ===
Haddad cooperated with non-PFLP organizations such as the Black September Organization, the West German Revolutionary Cells and the Japanese Red Army. He also secretly worked with several dictators, including Idi Amin and Muammar Gaddafi.

During the February 1972 Lufthansa Flight 649 hijacking, Haddad's commandos demanded the release of several Black September Organization members alongside Sirhan Sirhan. Haddad also enlisted one of his top militants, Ali Taha, to lead the Black September Organization's hijacking of Sabena Flight 571. After an Israeli commando raid foiled the plan and killed the hijackers, Haddad retaliated by collaborating with the Japanese Red Army to stage the Lod Airport massacre. In turn, Haddad sent his militants to support the Japanese Red Army's 20 July 1973 hijacking of Japan Air Lines Flight 404.

Haddad developed a close relationship with Ilich Ramírez Sánchez ("Carlos the Jackal") during the early 1970s. In January 1975, Haddad ordered Carlos and Johannes Weinrich, a member of the German Revolutionary Cells, to attack a Paris airport with RPGs. They fired two shots, which both missed, before escaping. Haddad planned another collaboration between the Revolutionary Cells and the PFLP, charging Carlos with leading a joint siege on a December 1975 OPEC meeting. The operation featured three PFLP and three Revolutionary Cell militants, including Wilfried Bose, and was supported by Muammar Gaddafi.

Using a combination of PFLP and German Revolutionary Cell militants, Haddad collaborated with Ugandan President Idi Amin to hijack Air France Flight 139 in June 1976. He charged Wilfried Bose with leading the hijacking. After the hijacking failed, Haddad sent PFLP and Japanese Red Army militants to attack Istanbul Airport in August 1976.

After years of the Revolutionary Cells primarily supporting the PFLP, not the other way around, in October 1977, Haddad sent four militants to hijack Lufthansa Flight 181 on behalf of the Revolutionary Cells. They demanded the release of 2 PFLP and 11 Revolutionary Cell members, the same militants whose release was demanded weeks earlier during the Revolutionary Cells' kidnapping of Martin Schleyer. The hijacking ended in a raid by GSG 9, and was Haddad's final operation.

Haddad had a close relationship with Swiss neo-Nazi, ODESSA facilitator, and former Abwehr agent Francois Genoud.

=== Relationship with the Soviet KGB ===
According to a letter from Yuri Andropov to Leonid Brezhnev in the Mitrokhin archives, the KGB recruited Haddad as Agent NATSIONALIST in 1970 for three purposes: gaining a degree of control over the PFLP's operations, exerting regional influence to Soviet favor, and leveraging PFLP assets to conduct clandestine operations that would not trace back to the USSR. Conversely, Haddad viewed collaboration with the KGB as a tool to obtain arms for the PFLP. The first major arms shipment, codenamed Operation VOSTOK, was discreetly handed over to Haddad at night in Aden, Yemen around July 1970. To prevent tracing back to the KGB, the shipment featured a substantial array of weapons and munitions sourced from outside the Eastern Bloc, including pistols, assault rifles, mines, and silencers. Some of the technology was among the most advanced in the Soviet arsenal and had not yet been given to even the other Warsaw Pact members.

The first KGB operation using Haddad as a proxy was Operation VINT, an attempt to kidnap the deputy head of the CIA station in Lebanon and take him to the USSR. Despite lengthy preparation, Haddad's militants failed in the kidnapping as the CIA agent varied his daily routine. A later attempt by the militants to assassinate the agent also failed.

Haddad utilized an elaborate system to covertly meet with a KGB operations officer in Beirut. These meetings enabled Haddad to receive intelligence and suggestions for operations from the KGB, and in turn, the KGB could dissuade Haddad from conducting operations that ran counter to Soviet interests. As a result, the KGB likely had knowledge and varying involvement in all of the PFLP's external operations. The exact level of involvement in Haddad's operations is mostly unknown, with one exception—the First Chief Directorate directly advised Haddad on the method, location, and timing of attack on an Israeli oil tanker, the Coral Sea. Two PFLP agents unsuccessfully attempted to sink the vessel using three RPG-7s on 13 June 1971.

In September 1974, Haddad visited Russia with his wife, son, and daughter. During discussions on Haddad's future with the KGB, he agreed to allocate several PFLP agents to tracking down Soviet defectors, and the KGB agreed to supply him with more sabotage equipment. The shipment included foreign-made pistols, assault rifles, and radio-controlled mines. The KGB sent another shipment in May 1975, including foreign-made pistols, machine guns, ammunition, and silencers. Both shipments arrived under the cover of darkness in Aden, as the July 1970 shipment had.

In 1976, Haddad sent ten militants to the Andropov Institute for 3 months of training. Repeat sessions were held in 1977 and 1978, and potentially for years after. Haddad visited Moscow in March 1977, receiving $10,000 and 10 foreign-made pistols with silencers. In exchange, he agreed to establish contact between the KGB and an Irish Republican Army representative in Algiers.

Some of the information about KGB-PFLP collaboration from the Mitrokhin archives is corroborated in the Bukovsky archives. Three classified documents from the CPSU Central Committee archive were located and secretly copied by Vladimir Bukovsky in 1992.

== Death ==
Haddad died on 28 March 1978 in East Germany, reportedly from leukemia. According to the book Striking Back, published by Aaron J. Klein in 2006, Haddad was killed by Mossad, which had sent the chocolate-loving Haddad Belgian chocolates coated with a slow-acting and undetectable poison which caused him to die several months later.

According to Ronen Bergman, Mossad killed Haddad by poisoning his toothpaste. On 10 January 1978, a deep-cover Mossad agent with a high level of access to Haddad's home and office switched his regular tube of toothpaste for an identical tube containing a toxin that had been developed at the Israel Institute for Biological Research. Some of the toxin penetrated the mucous membranes of his mouth and entered his bloodstream every time he brushed his teeth. Haddad became ill and was admitted to an Iraqi government hospital, where the doctors could not figure out what his condition was and suspected he had been poisoned. Upon Yasser Arafat's request, he was flown to East Germany to be hospitalized at a prestigious hospital which treated members of the intelligence and security communities, where he was admitted under the pseudonym of Ahmed Doukli.

According to Haddad, the tube of lethal toothpaste was included in a bag of toiletries his aides packed for him when he was taken to East Germany. He was extensively tested and the physicians suspected he had been poisoned with either rat poison or thallium, but found no direct evidence. His condition continued to deteriorate. According to intelligence provided by an Israeli agent in East Germany, Haddad's screams of pain were heard throughout the hospital and he had to be heavily dosed with tranquilizers and sedatives. Haddad died ten days after his arrival there.

What remained of the PFLP–EO dissolved after Haddad's death, but in the process inaugurated the 15 May Organization, the Popular Front for the Liberation of Palestine – Special Command (PFLP–SC) and the Lebanese Armed Revolutionary Factions.

== Sources ==
- Irving, Sarah (2012). Leila Khaled: Icon of Palestinian Liberation (PDF ed.). London: Pluto Press. ISBN 978 1 84964 673 4.
- Sayigh, Yezid (1997). Armed Struggle and the Search for State. Oxford: Clarendon Press. ISBN 0-19-829265-1.
- Ensalaco, Mark (2008). Middle Eastern Terrorism: From Black September to September 11. Philadelphia, PA: University of Pennsylvania Press. ISBN 978-0-8122-4046-7. JSTOR j.ctt3fhmb0.
- Mitrokhin, Vasili; Andrew, Christopher (2005). The World Was Going Our Way: The KGB and the Battle for The Third World. United States: Basic Books. ISBN 9780465003136.
