= Revolutionary Cells (German group) =

1973–1993 far-left militant organization

- Dates active: 1973–1995
- Active regions: West Germany; West Berlin
- Ideology: Communism; Marxism–Leninism; Anti-imperialism; Anti-Zionism; Autonomism
- Political position: Left-wing
- Wars: Operation Entebbe and the German Autumn

The Revolutionary Cells (German: Revolutionäre Zellen, abbreviated RZ) were a self-described "urban guerrilla" organization that was active between 1973 and 1995. The West German Interior Ministry described it as one of West Germany's most dangerous leftist terrorist groups in the early 1980s. According to the office of the German Federal Prosecutor, the Revolutionary Cells claimed responsibility for 186 attacks.

The Revolutionary Cells are known for the 1976 hijacking of an Air France flight in cooperation with the Popular Front for the Liberation of Palestine – External Operations (PFLP-EO) and diverting it to Uganda's Entebbe Airport, where the participating members were granted temporary asylum until they were killed by commandos of the Israel Defense Forces (IDF) during Operation Entebbe, a hostage rescue mission carried out at Entebbe Airport.

== History ==
=== Activities ===
Formed in the early 1970s from networks of independent militant groups in West Germany, such as the Autonomen movement and the feminist Rote Zora, the Revolutionary Cells became known to the general public in the wake of the hijacking of an Air France airliner to Entebbe, Uganda, in 1976.

The Air France hijacking ended with Operation Entebbe, the Israeli rescue raid and the killing of two of Revolutionary Cells' founding members, Wilfried Böse (known as Boni), and Brigitte Kuhlmann. Böse's friend Johannes Weinrich, another Revolutionary Cells founder, left the group to work for Ilich Ramírez Sánchez – better known as Carlos the Jackal – together with his girlfriend Magdalena Kopp, later Carlos' wife.

Prior to the Air France hijacking, members of the later Revolutionary Cells took part in bombings of the premises of ITT in Berlin and Nuremberg, and the Federal Constitutional Court of Germany in Karlsruhe. Revolutionary Cells member Hans-Joachim Klein took part in the December 1975 raid on the Vienna OPEC conference, together with Carlos and Gabriele Kröcher-Tiedemann of J2M.

In June 1981, the Revolutionary Cells bombed the U.S. Army V Corps headquarters in Frankfurt and officer clubs in Gelnhausen, Bamberg and Hanau. When US President Reagan visited Germany in 1982, the Revolutionary Cells claimed responsibility for many bombs detonated shortly before he arrived. Federal prosecutor Kurt Rebmann said in early December 2008 that the Revolutionary Cells were responsible for about 30 attacks that year. In November 1981, members of the Revolutionary Cells helped the Irish National Liberation Army (INLA) carry out a bombing attack on a British Army base in Herford in which a British soldier was injured.

=== Demise ===
The group is thought to have lost much of its remaining covert support amongst the radical left in the wake of German reunification and the subsequent dissolution of the Soviet Union. In a pamphlet published in December 1991, the Revolutionary Cells attempted a critical review of their anti-imperialist and anti-Zionist campaign during the 1970s and 1980s, with particular emphasis on the ill-fated Air France hijacking and its much publicised segregation of Jewish and non-Jewish passengers.

The antisemitism evident in the Entebbe hijacking had become the focus of long-running internal arguments during which one of the Revolutionary Cells members, Hans-Joachim Klein, eventually left the movement. Klein had sent a letter and his gun to Der Spiegel in 1977, announcing his resignation. In an interview with Jean-Marcel Bougereau,

Klein expressed the view that the two German political militants who had participated in the Entebbe operation were more antisemitic than Wadie Haddad, leader of the PFLP operational division, for planning to assassinate the Nazi hunter Simon Wiesenthal. Even the notorious political militant Carlos opposed this operation on the grounds that Wiesenthal was an anti-Nazi.

According to Wiesenthal (quoting Klein's Libération interview), the plot was first proposed by Böse.

Klein also announced that the Revolutionary Cells planned to assassinate the president of the Central Council of Jews in Germany, Heinz Galinski. The Revolutionary Cells responded to Klein's allegations with a letter of their own:

instead of reflecting on Galinski's role in the crimes of Zionism, for the cruelties of Israel's imperialistic army, you don't reflect on the propaganda work and material support of this guy, you don't see him as anything other than "a leader of the Jewish community", and: you don't reflect about what to do against this fact, and what could be done in a country like ours ... You avoid this political discussion and get excited about the maintained (anti-semitism?) fascism of the Revolutionary Cells and the men behind them.

Klein hid in Normandy, France, to where he was traced in 1998. One of the witnesses at his trial was his former friend, former German Foreign Minister Joschka Fischer. In some accounts, Fischer's break with the far-left was due to the Entebbe affair.

== See also ==
- Red Army Faction
- Japanese Red Army
- Red triangle (badge)
- Reichstag fire
