= Murder of Dora Bloch =

Israeli hostage on Air France Flight 139 (1902-1976)

Dora Bloch
- דורה בלוך
- Bloch in 1971
- Born: Dora Feinberg; October 1902; Jaffa, Ottoman Empire
- Died: July 1976 (aged 73); Kampala, Second Republic of Uganda
- Cause of death: Murdered on the orders of Idi Amin following the Entebbe raid
- Body discovered: Near the Kampala–Jinja Highway in 1979
- Burial place: Har HaMenuchot, Israel
- Citizenship: Israel; United Kingdom
- Spouse: Aharon Bloch (m. 1925)
- Children: 3

Dora Bloch (Note: Hebrew: דורה בלוך) (née Feinberg; October 1902 – July 1976) was an Israeli hostage on Air France Flight 139 on 26 June 1976. Taking off from Tel Aviv, Israel, and destined for Paris, France, the plane soon landed in Athens, Greece, for a scheduled stopover and was subsequently hijacked by two Palestinians from the Popular Front for the Liberation of Palestine and two Germans from the Revolutionary Cells, who rerouted to Benghazi, Libya, and then to Entebbe, Uganda, where they received support from Ugandan president Idi Amin. Bloch, who had become ill during the flight, was taken to a hospital in Kampala and was therefore not among the 102 hostages who were rescued when Israel executed Operation Thunderbolt on 4 July 1976.

She disappeared shortly after the hostages were rescued; her status as a British citizen and Amin's complicity in the hijacking resulted in the United Kingdom severing diplomatic ties with the Commonwealth country. In 1979, during the Tanzanian invasion of Uganda, Bloch's body was discovered by Tanzanian soldiers at a sugar plantation near Kampala and subsequently returned to Israel, where she was buried in Jerusalem. In February 2007, declassified British government documents confirmed that she had been murdered by Ugandan authorities on Amin's orders.

== Biography ==
Bloch was born in Jaffa in October 1902. Her mother was Berta Feinberg. Her father Joseph Feinberg was among the founders of Rishon LeZion, along with his brother Israel Feinberg. After her father's death, she was raised by an uncle in neighbouring Egypt and later moved to Jerusalem as an adult. She was fluent in Hebrew, Arabic, Russian, German, Italian, and English. In 1920, shortly after the establishment of the British Mandate for Palestine, she met her future husband Aharon Bloch (Hebrew: אהרון אהרן בלוך) while he was serving in the British Army; the two married in 1925 and Aharon's status as a naturalized citizen of the United Kingdom extended British citizenship rights to Bloch. The couple had three sons together. By 1976, she was a widowed grandmother living in Tel Aviv.

== Air France Flight 139 ==
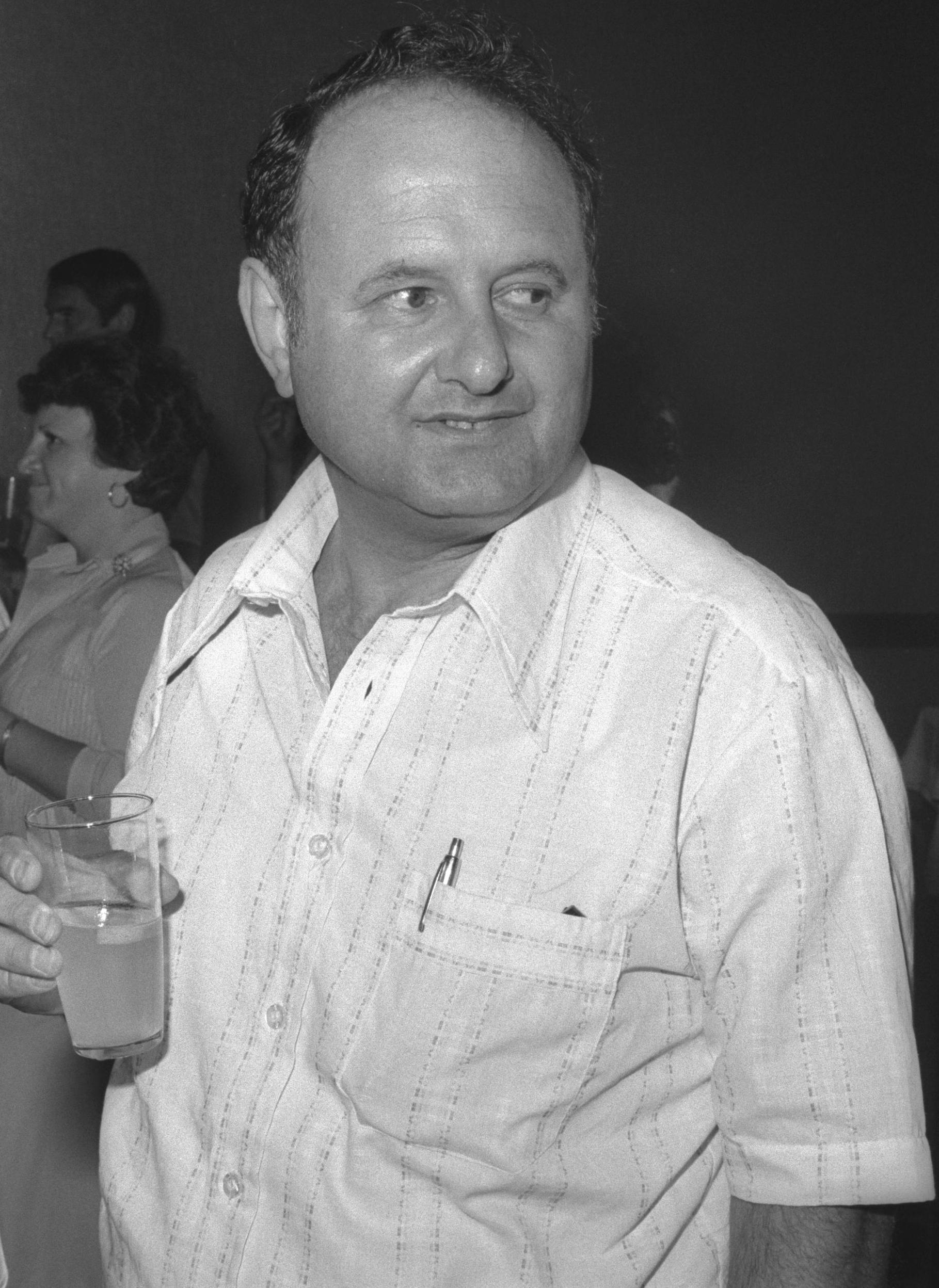
Bloch's son Ilan Hartuv, with whom she had been travelling, 1976

On 27 June 1976, Bloch, aged 73, was on Air France Flight 139, an Airbus A300 plane, travelling to New York City for her youngest son Daniel's wedding. The flight was hijacked by terrorists after a stopover in Athens and was redirected to Entebbe, Uganda. With her fluency in languages, Bloch served as an interpreter between the hostages and hijackers.

Bloch became ill on the plane and was transferred to Mulago Hospital in Kampala. She is believed to have choked on food, and Foreign and Commonwealth Office papers say that she was also being treated for leg ulcers while at the hospital. Bloch's son Ilan Hartuv, who was freed during the subsequent Operation Entebbe counter-terrorist hostage-rescue mission, was able to speak to a Ugandan doctor about his mother's health. Henry Kyemba, then Uganda's Minister of Health, said that he had allowed Bloch to stay in hospital for an extra night before being returned to the other hostages. As a result of this, Bloch was not with the other hostages, and so was not freed during the Operation Entebbe raid.

During Operation Entebbe, Bloch's family in Israel were taken to the HaKirya military complex in Tel Aviv, before going to the airport. Once at the airport, they were told that Bloch was still in Uganda. They spent an hour observing the traditional mourning ritual (shiva), but no longer as she was not confirmed dead.

On 4 July, the British Government were informed that Bloch was not among the hostages released during Operation Entebbe. As a result, she was visited by James Hennessy, then-High Commissioner of the United Kingdom to Uganda, and Peter Chandley, second secretary of the British High Commission in Kampala. Bloch told Chandley that she had been treated well in the hospital, but did not like the food. They were also told that Bloch was going to be moved to the Grand Imperial Hotel in Kampala. Chandley and his wife went to get some food for Bloch, but when they returned, they were denied entry to the hospital. Later declassified British intelligence revealed that that four men, including Farouk Minawa, head of the State Research Bureau (Ugandan secret police) and Idi Amin's Chief of Protocol Nasur Ondoga, had taken Bloch from her hospital bed and murdered her. The policeman guarding Bloch was also killed.

== Aftermath ==
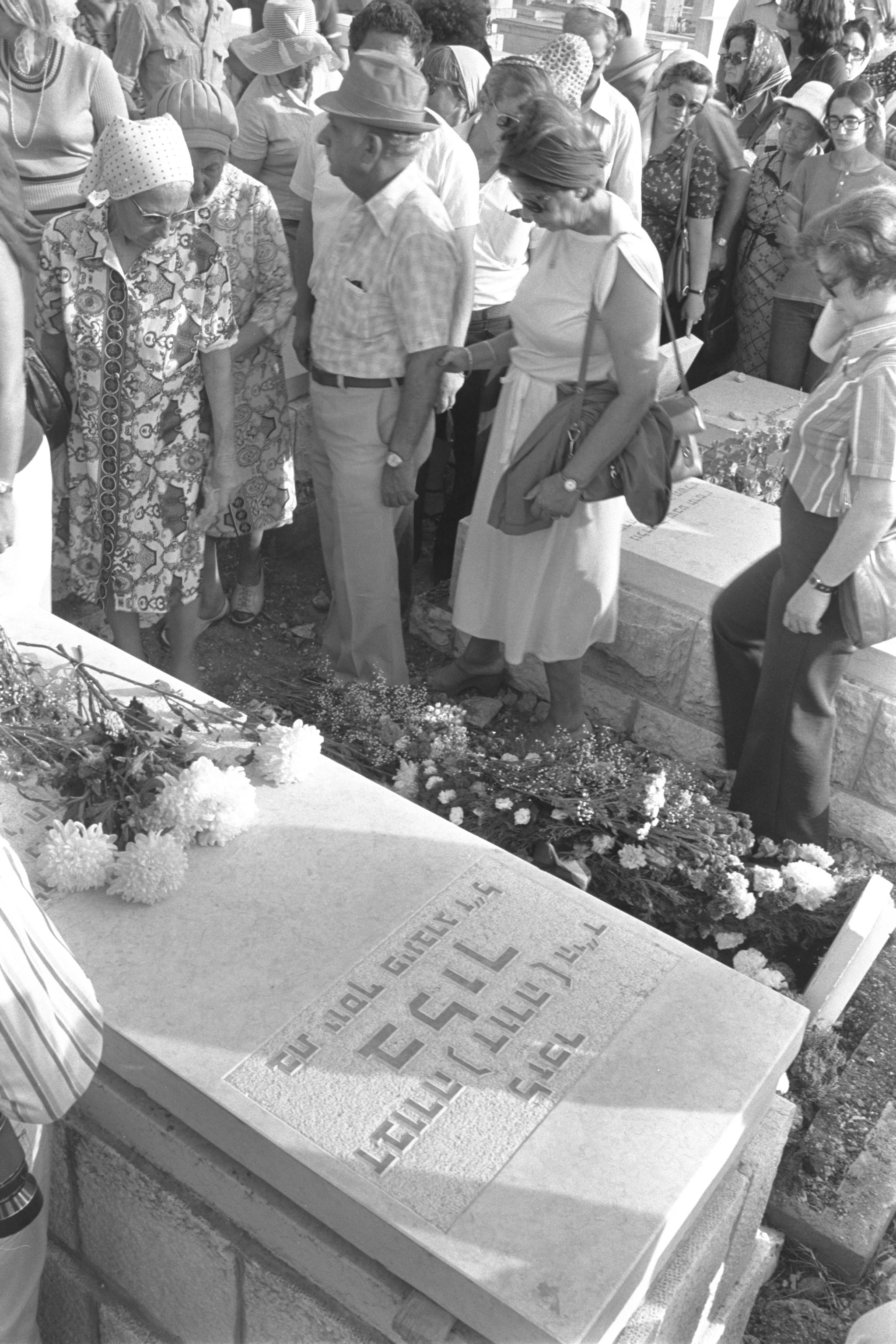
Burial of Dora Bloch, Jerusalem, 1979

A search by Ugandan police did not find Bloch, and the Ugandan government informed the UK that they "had no responsibility" for Bloch after Operation Entebbe. In early July, a Ugandan traveller reported seeing a body, which he believed to be Bloch, near a group of Ugandan soldiers, around 18 kilometres (11 mi) from Kampala. On 9 July, the United Nations debated the Entebbe hijacking incident. The United Kingdom suggested a resolution that condemned both the hijack and the loss of life, so as not to endanger the lives of Britons in Uganda, including Bloch. During the debate, the Ugandan government reiterated their claim that Bloch had been returned to Entebbe airport.

On 13 July, Minister of State for the Foreign and Commonwealth Office Ted Rowlands said that Bloch was presumed dead. On 15 July, the British Government demanded a full search for "Bloch or her body", a request that was never fulfilled. A suggested motive for her killing was retaliation for the deaths of 50 Ugandan soldiers during Operation Entebbe. Amin later expelled Chandley from the High Commission, alleging that he was pro-Israeli and had supported the death of Ugandan troops.

As a result of Bloch's disappearance, Britain withdrew their High Commissioner to Uganda, and on 28 July, Britain cut all diplomatic ties with Uganda. It was the first time in 30 years that Britain had severed ties with a Commonwealth country. The British Government said that the main reason for cutting ties was the disappearance of Bloch, although other events during Amin's leadership had also contributed. In retaliation, Amin declared himself the "Conqueror of the British Empire (CBE)", and the unofficial King of Scotland. He added "Conqueror of the British Empire" to his list of official titles. After the fall of Amin in 1979, Britain recommenced diplomatic relations with Uganda.

In 1987, Kyemba said that Bloch had been dragged from her hospital bed and murdered by members of the Ugandan Army loyal to Amin. Declassified British documents released in February 2007 confirmed that Bloch had been killed on Amin's orders. According to the documents, a Ugandan citizen told the British High Commissioner in Kampala that Bloch had been shot and her body deposited into the boot of a car with Ugandan intelligence services number plates. The documents also showed that Britain continued to press Amin for information on Bloch's whereabouts, and that Amin continually denied knowledge of her fate.

=== Recovery of body ===
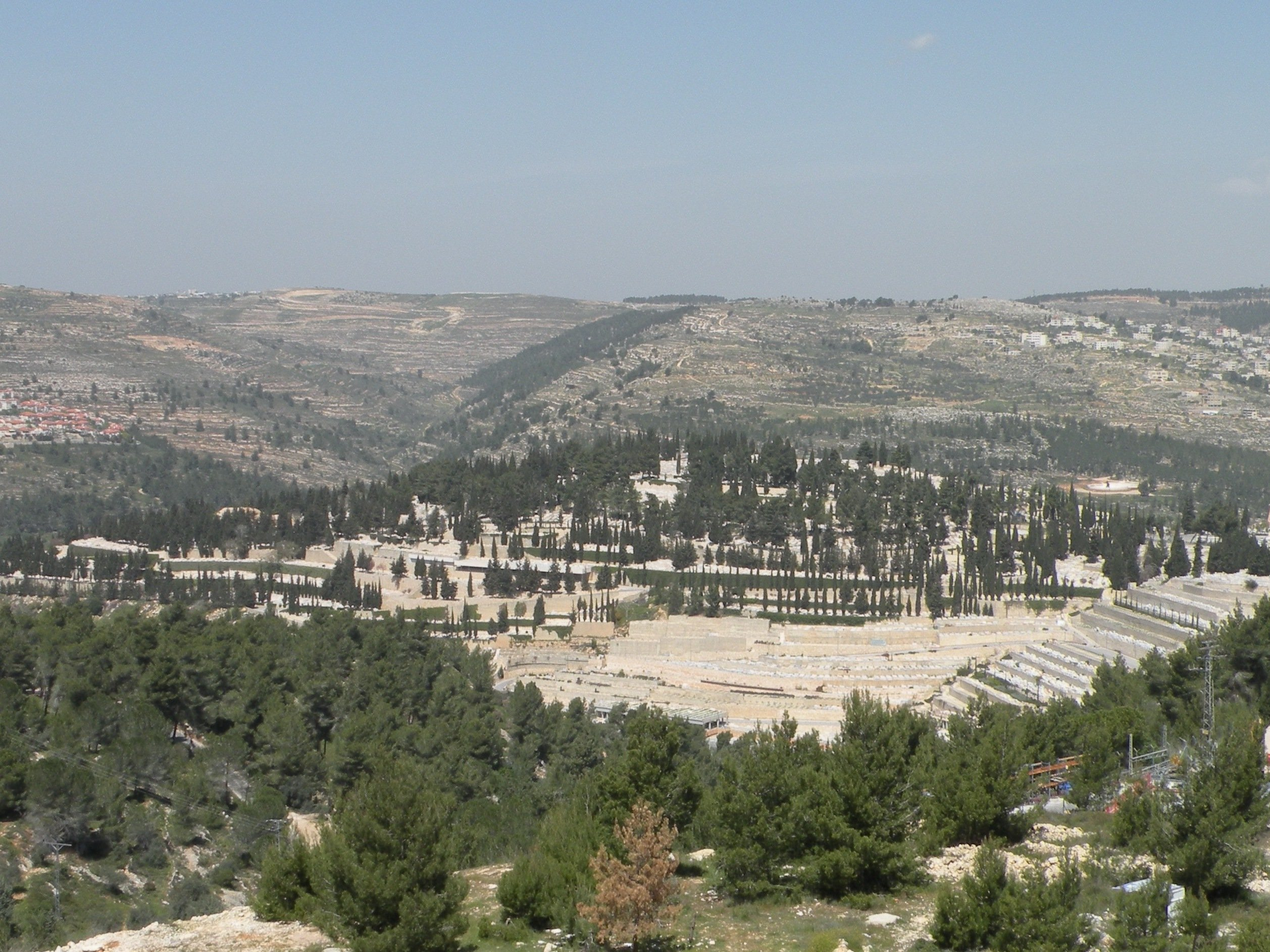
Har HaMenuchot, the Jewish cemetery where Bloch is buried, 2010

After the Uganda–Tanzania War, Tanzanian troops discovered Bloch's body in 1979 in a sugar plantation around 30 kilometres (20 mi) from Kampala, near the Jinja Road. Visual identification was impossible because her face was badly burned, but the corpse showed signs of a leg ulcer. A pathologist working with the Israel Defense Forces formally identified Bloch from the remains. Her remains were returned to her son in Israel, where she was given an Israeli state funeral. She was buried in Jerusalem's Har HaMenuchot Cemetery.
