= Ardito (name) =

Ardito is both a surname and a given name. Notable people with the name include:

== Given name ==
- Arturo Bresciani, real name: Ardito Bresciani (1899, San Martino Buon Albergo – 1948, Saint-André-d'Allas), Italian cyclist
- Ardito Desio (1897, Palmanova – 2001), Italian explorer, mountain climber, geologist and cartographer

== Surname ==
- Andrea Ardito (born 1977, Viareggio), Italian football footballer and coach
- Ciro Ardito (born 1970, Milan), Italian canoeist
- Dave Ardito (born 1988, Bavaria), German director, martial artist and actor
- Douglas "Doug" John Ardito (born 1971, Bedford), American musician
- Fabrizio Ardito (born 1957, Rome), Italian journalist, photographer and writer
- Giuseppe Ardito (1938, Chieti – 2009, Rome), Italian soldier
- John "Buster" (Gregory) Ardito (1919, New York City – 2006), American caporegime in the Genovese crime family
- Rosetta Ardito, stage name: Patricia Carli (born 1938, Taranto), Italian-Belgian singer and composer
- Pietro Ardito

- Pietro Ardito (presbyter) (1833, Nicastro – 1889, Nicastro), Italian priest, essayist and literary critic
- Pietro Ardito (cartoonist) (1919, Buenos Aires – 2005), Italian designer, cartoonist and painter

- Robert Ardito (born ?), Australian martial artist
- Stefano Ardito (born 1954, Rome), Italian writer, mountaineer, director, photographer and television presenter
- Nicolás Ardito Barletta Vallarino (born 1938, Aguadulce), President of Panama

== See also ==
- Ardito (disambiguation)
- Ardit
- Arditi (surname)
- Arditti (surname)
