= Arditi (surname) =

Arditi is a surname. Notable people with the surname include:

- Lior Arditi (born 1977), Israeli basketball player
- Luigi Arditi (1822–1903), Italian violinist, composer and conductor
- Binyamin Arditi (1897–1981), Austrian/Bulgarian-Israeli politician, author
- Esther Arditi (1937–2003), Israeli soldier, the only woman recipient of the Medal of Distinguished Service
- Giacomo Arditi (1815–1891), Italian historian, economist and writer
- Metin Arditi (born 1945), French-speaking Swiss writer of Turkish Sephardi origin
- Michele Arditi (1746–1838), Italian lawyer, antiquarian and archaeologist
- Moshe Arditi, Turkish-American physician
- Pierre Arditi (born 1944), French actor
- Dani Arditi (born 1951), head of the Israeli National Security Council 2007-2009
- David Arditi (born 1945), American academic of Turkish Sephardi descent, construction engineering, well published researcher and author

== See also ==
- Ardito (surname)
- Arditi (disambiguation)
