= Arditti =

Arditti is a surname. Notable people with the surname include:

- Irvine Arditti (born 1953), English violinist
- Lior Arditti (born 1977), Israeli basketball player
- Michael Arditti, English writer
- Paul Arditti, British sound designer
- Philip Arditti (born 1979), British actor
- Rita Arditti (1934–2009), Argentine writer
- Robert Arditti (born 1946), English actor
- Roberto Arditti (1965–2026), Italian journalist

== See also ==
- Arditi (surname)
- Arditi (disambiguation)
