= Hermathena (composite of Hermes and Athena) =

Composite statue

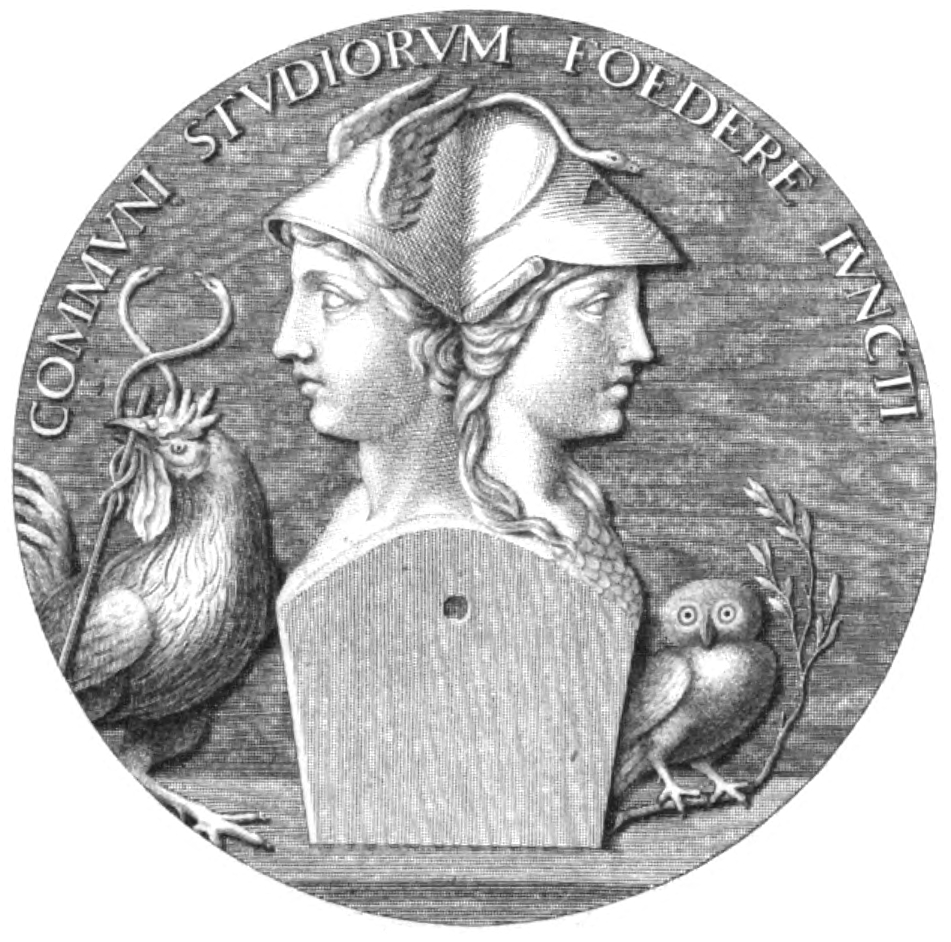
An engraving of Hermathena published in L'Ermatena by Michele Arditi (1816)

Hermathena or Hermathene (Ancient Greek: Ἑρμαθήνη) was a composite statue, or rather a herm, which may have been a terminal bust or a Janus-like bust, representing the Greek gods Hermes and Athena, or their Roman counterparts Mercury and Minerva.

== Symbolism ==
It was natural to see these two deities unified or fused as one form: the Greek god Hermes presided over eloquence, the goddess Athena over crafts and the sciences. The reverse of a medal of the Roman Emperor Hadrian, who prided himself on his learning and eloquence, depicts Hermathena. In early Greek poetry and myth, Hermes and Athena share or 'double' each other's functions, and some of their powers are alternate and related versions of the same quality. For example, each god embodies the kind of clever intelligence or metis that manifests itself in the clever ruse and the winning strategy. For Hermes this quality leans toward the 'night-time' realm of stealth and theft, cunning deception, and successful guidance to the underworld; while for Athena it leans toward the 'day-time' realm of good judgement, quick thinking, and successful guidance on the battlefield. Hermes and Athena were also described as half-siblings because Zeus was the father of both gods. Additionally, both Hermes and Athena guided cunning heroes like Perseus, Herakles, and Odysseus.

== Literature ==
The only literary sources concerning Hermathena are found in letters by Cicero to Atticus. Atticus had obtained a rare herm of Athena from Athens for Cicero's Tusculanum (Tusculum villa) in 67–65 BC.

Cicero writes to Atticus: "Your Hermathena pleases me greatly. It stands so prettily that the whole lecture-room looks like a votive chapel of the deity. I am greatly obliged to you".

He returns to the subject in another letter. Atticus had probably purchased for him another sculpture of the same kind.

"What you write about the Hermathena pleases me greatly. It is a most appropriate ornament for my own little 'seat of learning.' Hermes is suitable every where, and Minerva is the special emblem of a lecture-room. I should be glad if you would, as you suggest, find as many more ornaments of the same kind for the place".

== In art ==
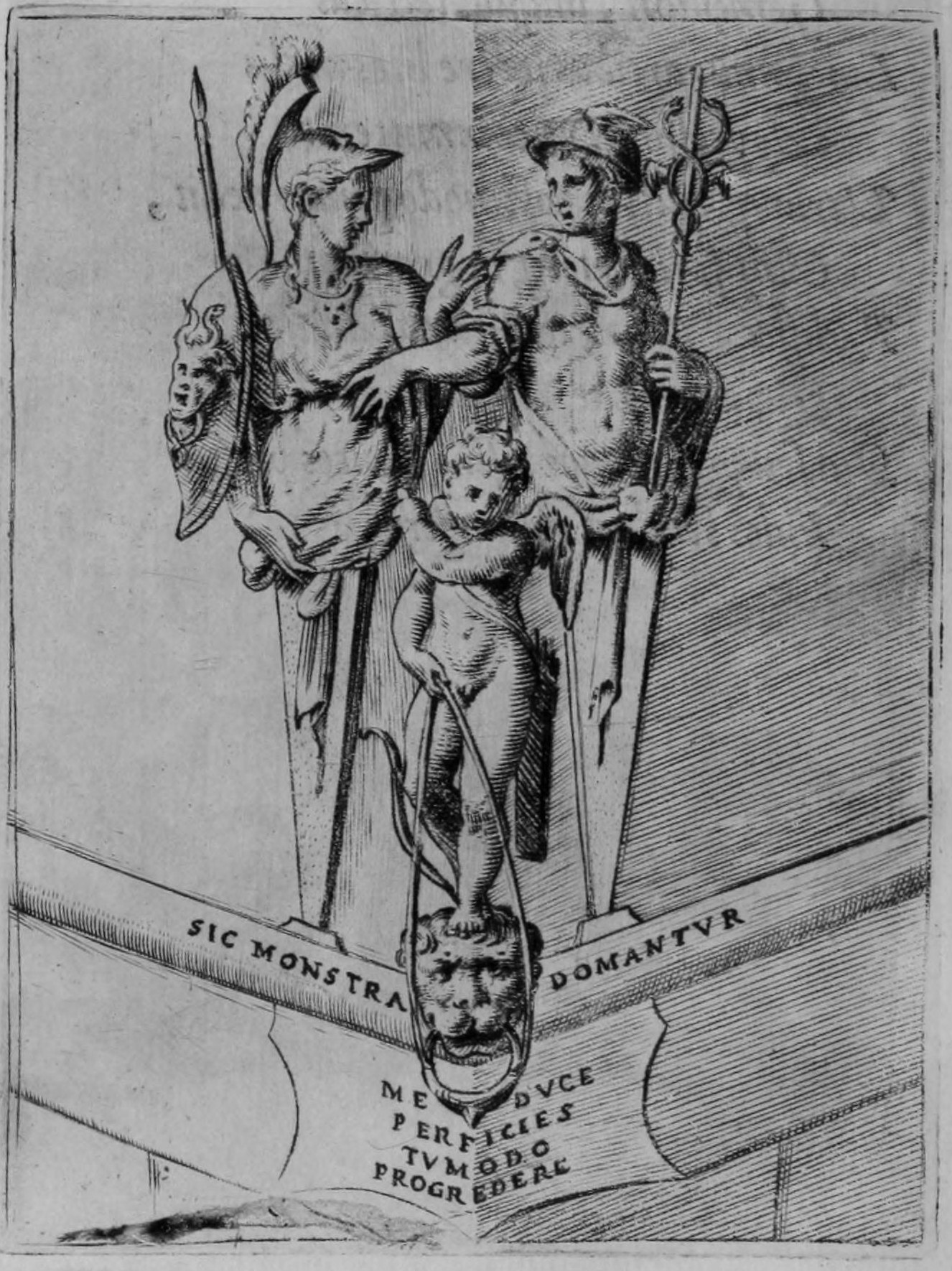
Hermathena emblem from Symbolicarum quaestionum by Achille Bocchi (1574)

It was common during the Roman period for the elite to collect herms and terminal figures as garden ornaments and interior decorations for their villas and palaces. Having a statue of Hermathena may have also been believed to give divine inspiration.

One of the few surviving Hermathenas is on display at the Naples National Archaeological Museum. A bust of Athena from the 1st century BC (circa 49–25 BC), that had once topped a terminal pillar, was found at the Villa of the Papyri at Herculaneum.

During the Renaissance, a number of artists, for example Rubens and Vincenzo Cartari, portrayed Hermathena in art either as two gods acting in conjunction, or as a single deity with the attributes of the other, for example Athene holding the caduceus, which was a symbol of Hermes. On the ceiling at the Villa Farnese is a late-16th-century fresco of Hermathena, called the Gabinetto dell'Ermatena, by Federico Zuccari; the fresco depicts an androgynous fusion of the deities.

== See also ==
- Hermaphroditus
- Hermanubis
