= Jean Mignon =

16th-century French painter and etcher

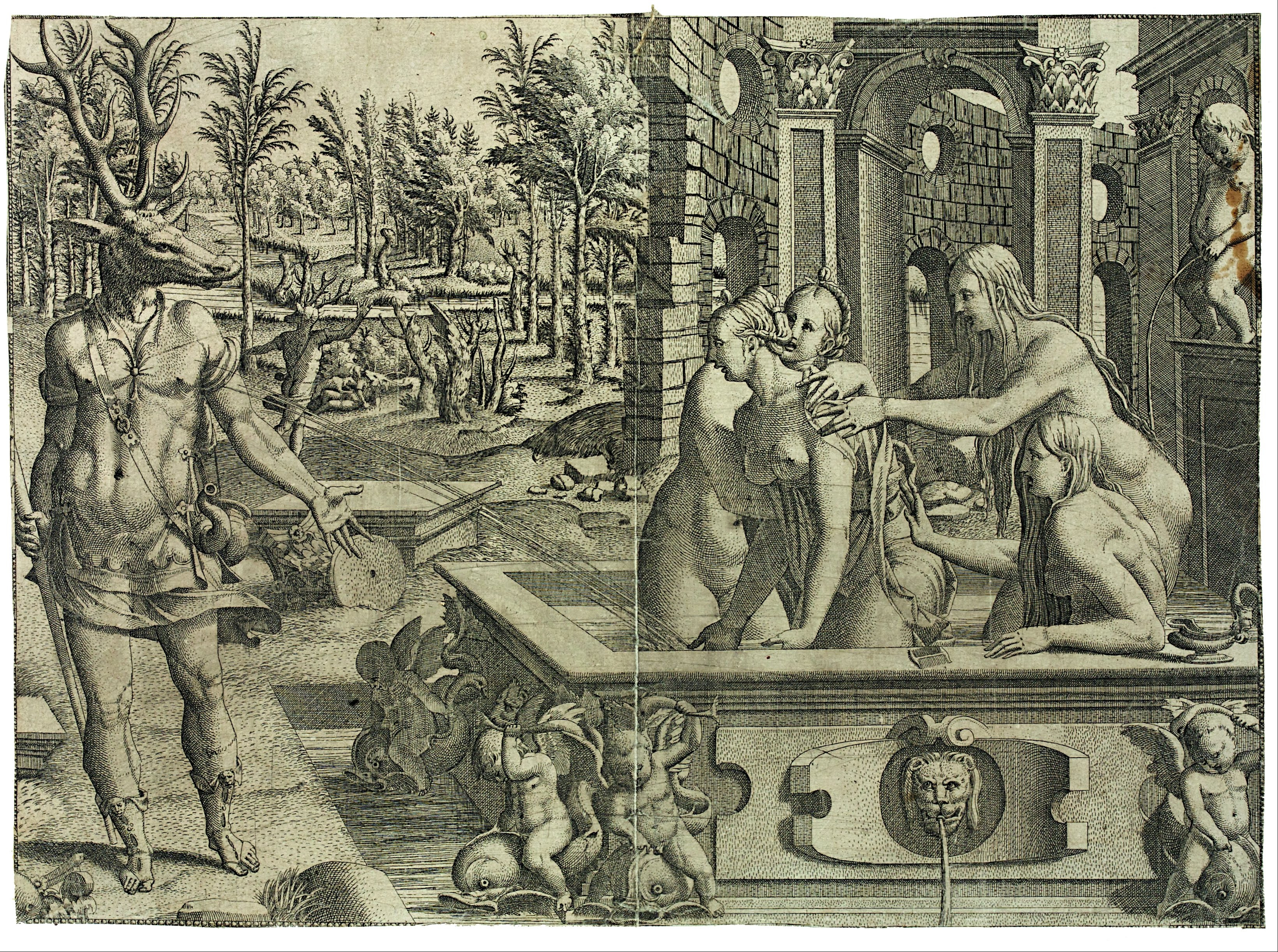
The Transformation of Actaeon, etching, 430 x 574 mm, 1550s?, without its very elaborate frame. Actaeon is shown three times, finally being killed by his hounds.

Jean Mignon was a French artist in painting and printmaking in the 16th century, active from 1537 to the mid-1550s. He worked in etching, sometimes supplemented by engraving, and was one of the first group of artists in France to use etching for prints. He was part of the burst of activity in the 1540s associated with the First School of Fontainebleau.

At least half of his prints, over thirty, use compositions by the Italian painter Luca Penni, who was also at the palace from 1537 through to the 1540s. Others use designs by Francesco Primaticcio, the leader of the school after the suicide of Rosso Fiorentino in 1540. Mignon's prints number around sixty, with some uncertainty over the authorship of a number.

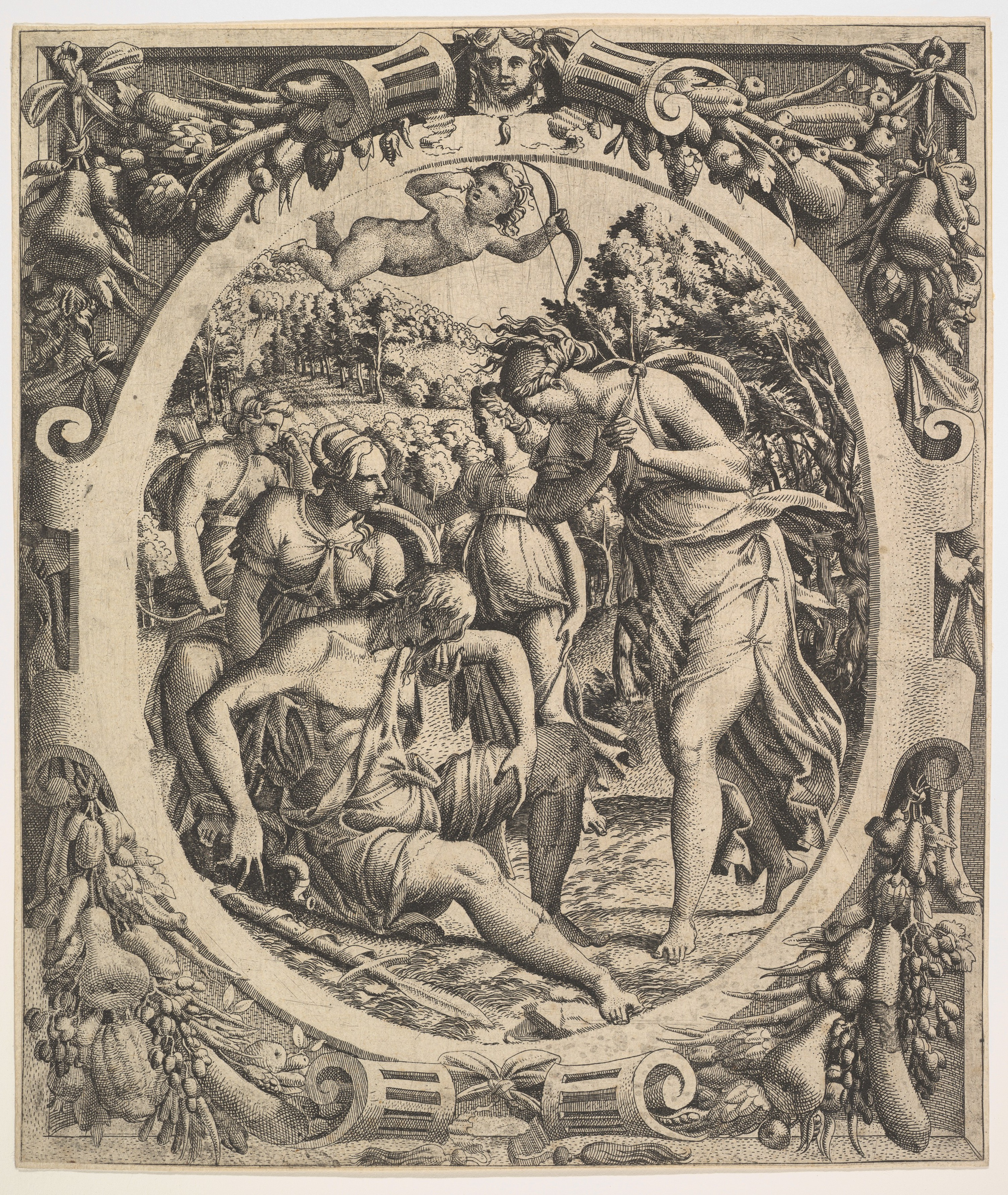
The Death of Adonis, 285 x 242 mm

Nothing is known about his origins or early life. His first documentary appearance is in 1537 in the royal accounts, as a painter at the Palace of Fontainebleau, continuing until 1540; no painting identifiable as his is known, and his etchings form his known oeuvre. His only dated prints are one of 1543, and "five or six" dated 1544; only two prints are signed, one also dated 1544. At some point, like Penni, he moved to Paris, where he is recorded from 1550 until his death in the winter of 1556 to 1557.

== Prints ==
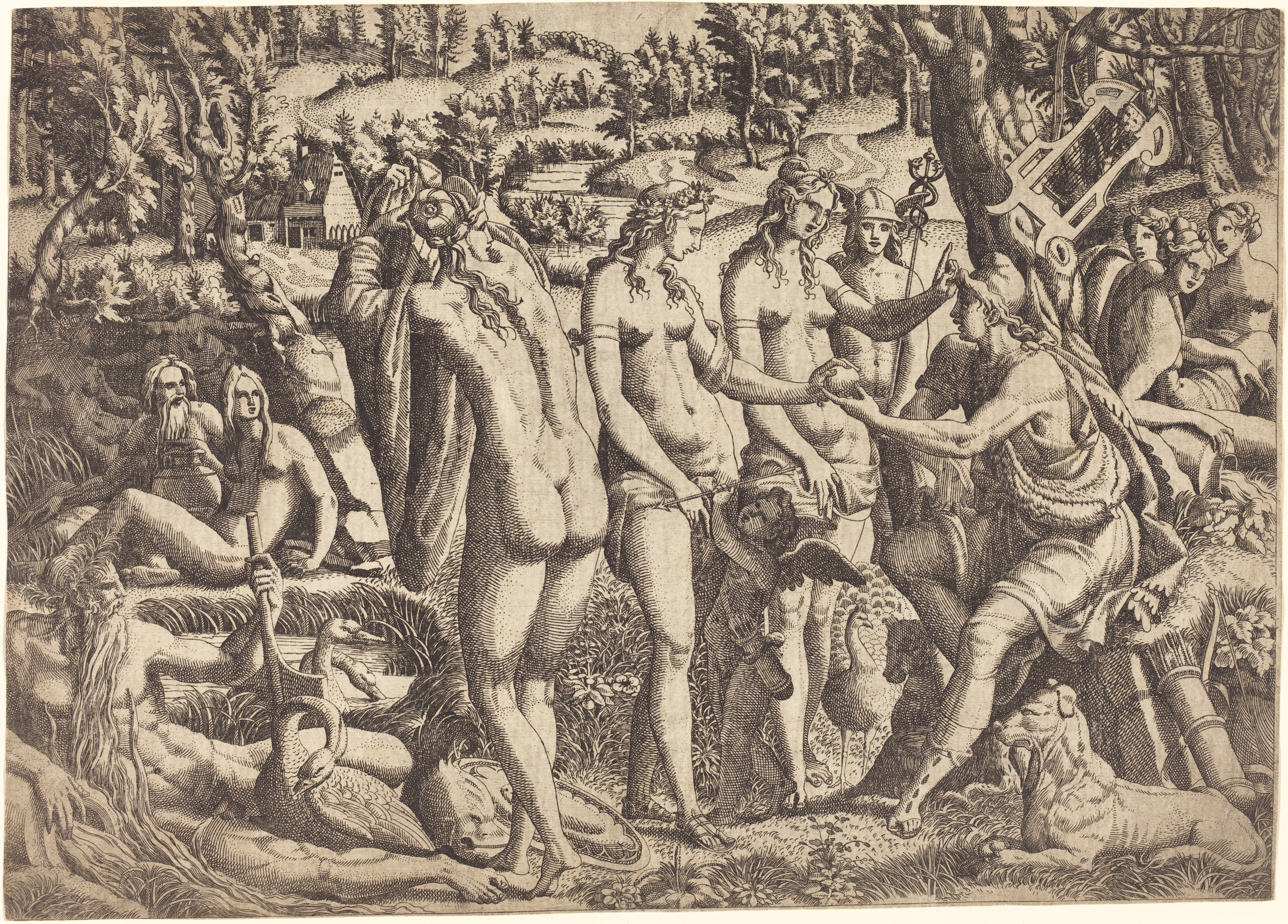
Judgement of Paris, 303 x 423 mm, first of the Trojan set

His prints cover a range of subjects, including classical mythology and literature, religious subjects, and ornament prints. Many are crowded scenes, and relatively large for the period, with the largest dimensions over 600 mm. There seems to have been a gap in his printmaking in the late 1540s, perhaps coinciding with a period when Penni seems to have been absent in Germany, probably with Leon Davent. The putative later group is relatively small in number, but larger in size, and demonstrates a more developed technique, with a "much greater variety of etching strokes ...creating an extraordinary range of textures". Most of the latter group have elaborate frames.

Like other School of Fontainebleau etchings, many have very elaborate frames, and may have been of interest to buyers as models for craftsmen in other media. But with one partial exception, none of the frames seem to exactly copy the elaborate stucco frames in the palace. The exception is a print purely of a frame, with an empty oval in the centre, two full length female nudes and various smaller figures of putti and herms. This is the only one of his etchings to be both signed and dated,1544. The frame is very similar to four stucco frames still in the palace on the "Staircase of the King", but not exactly the same as any of them; a drawing (of unclear authorship) the print probably copies is in the Louvre. The etching technique is confident and effective, although it is probably relatively early in his etching career.

There is an early series of 20 ornament prints of very fanciful terms or terminal figures. These are now normally given to Mignon, though the variety of styles used suggests they were a collaborative effort by the Fontainebleau group. These were very popular, and reprinted for over a century.

There are six large prints (around 320 x 440 mm) with the story of the Trojan War, regarded as coming from 1544 or 1545. Three drawings for them by Penni survive (Louvre), in the reverse direction, to which Mignon has added vegetation. These do not have frames. They show a characteristic of Penni and Mignon's images, with most figures having their mouths open. Another early series shows four standard scenes from the Passion of Jesus, beginning with a Deposition; these are in vertical format, with frames.

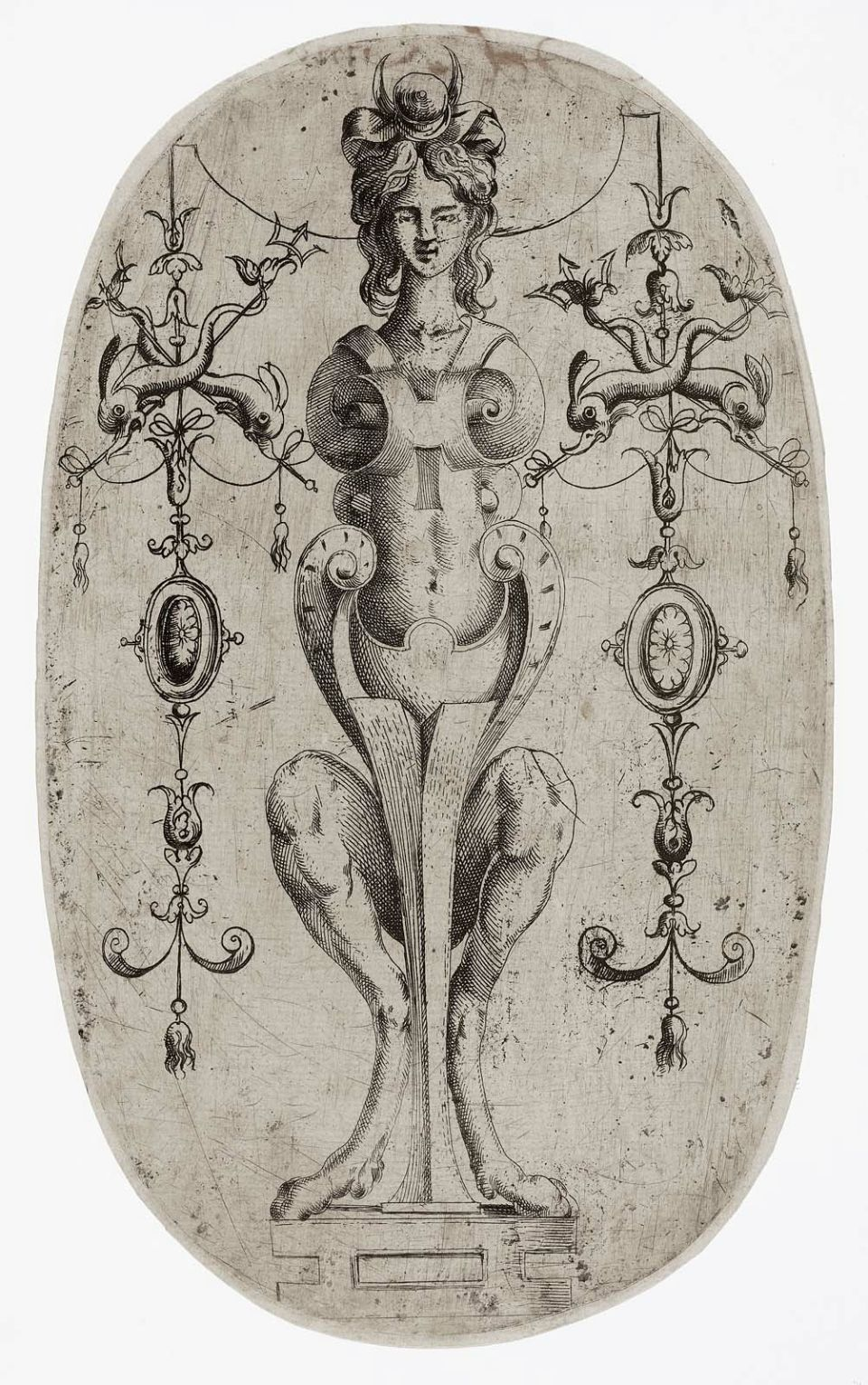
Terminal Figure: Sphinx with crescent in her hair

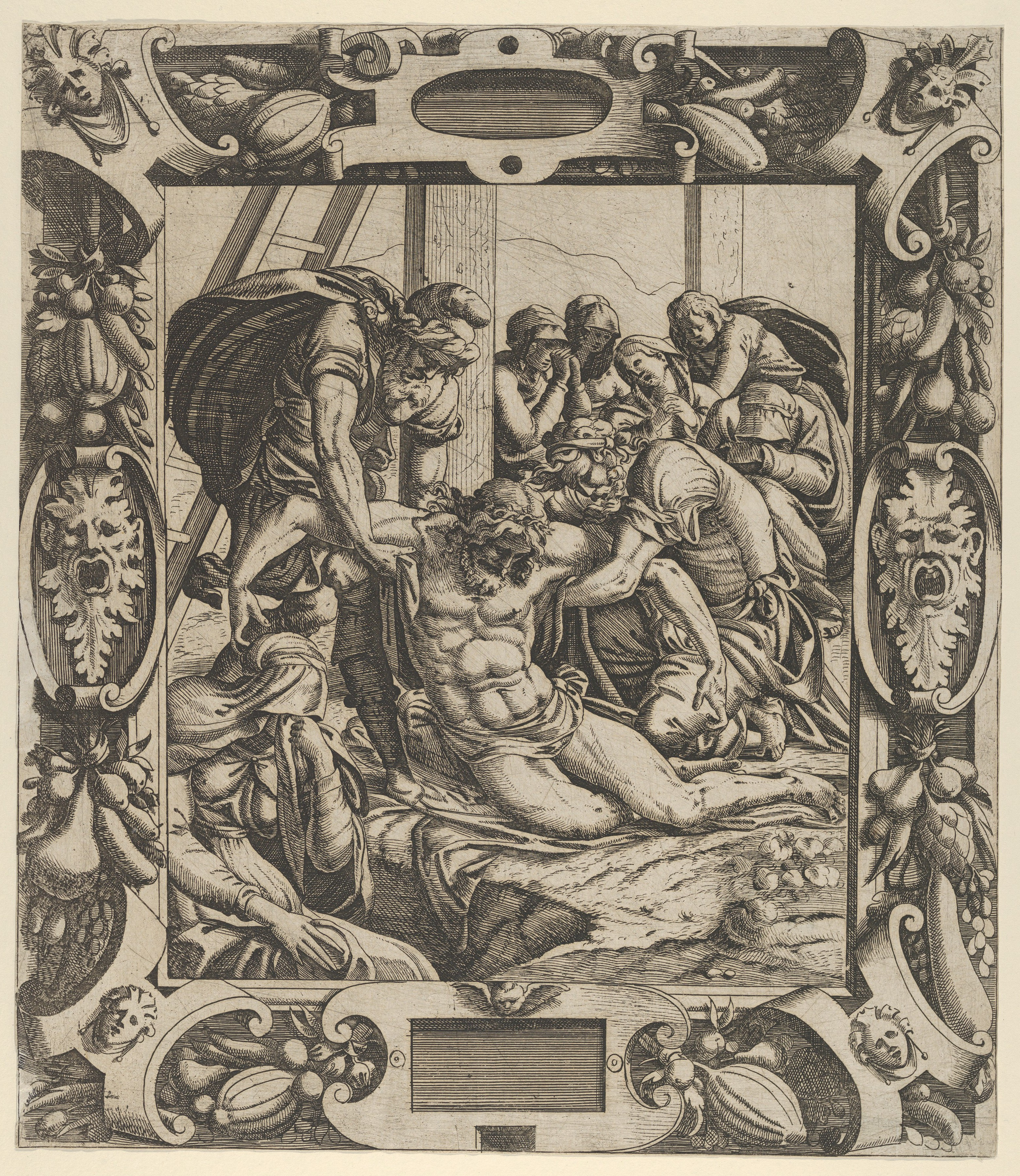
Deposition of Christ

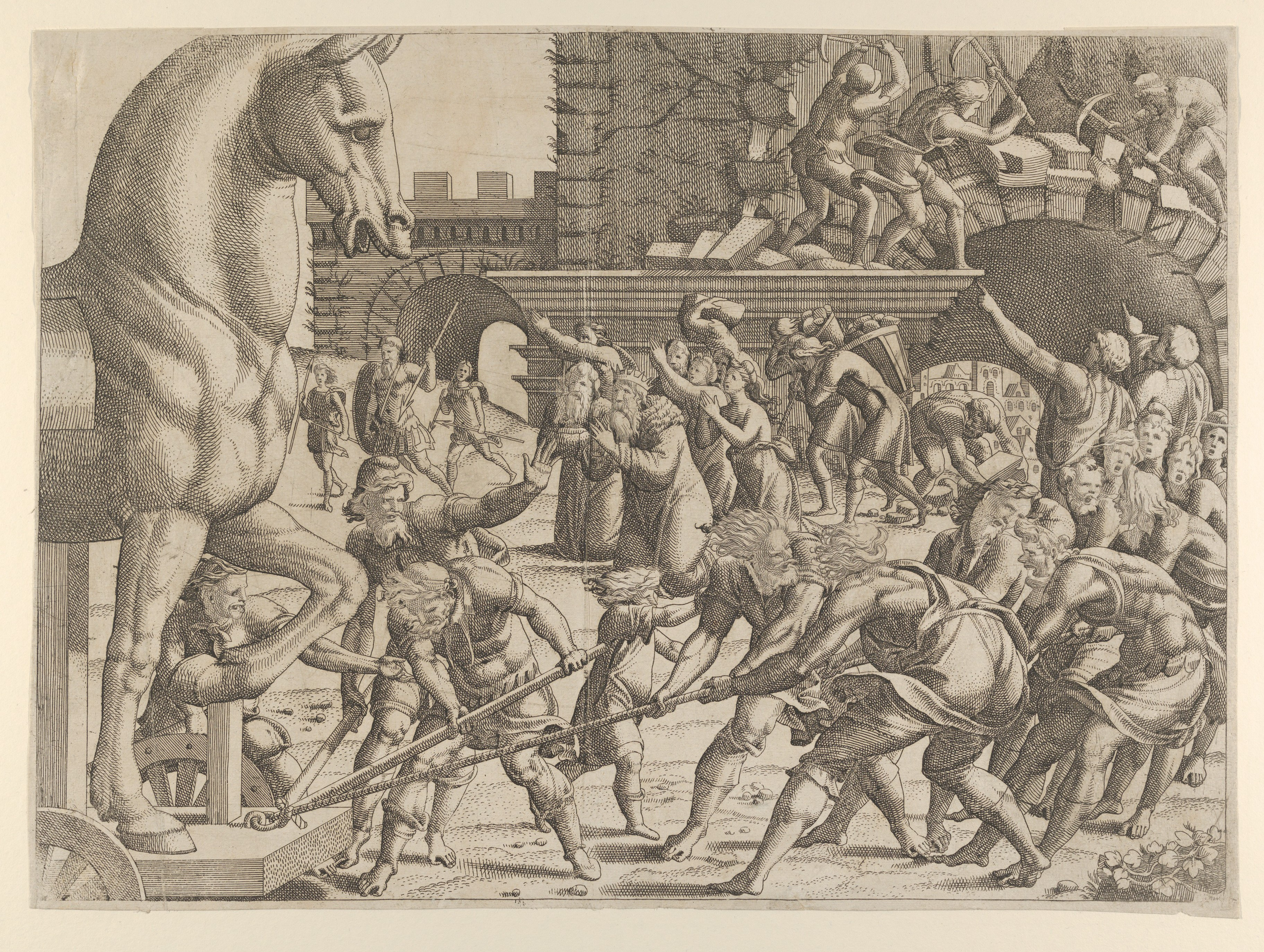
The Trojans Bring the Wooden Horse into Their City

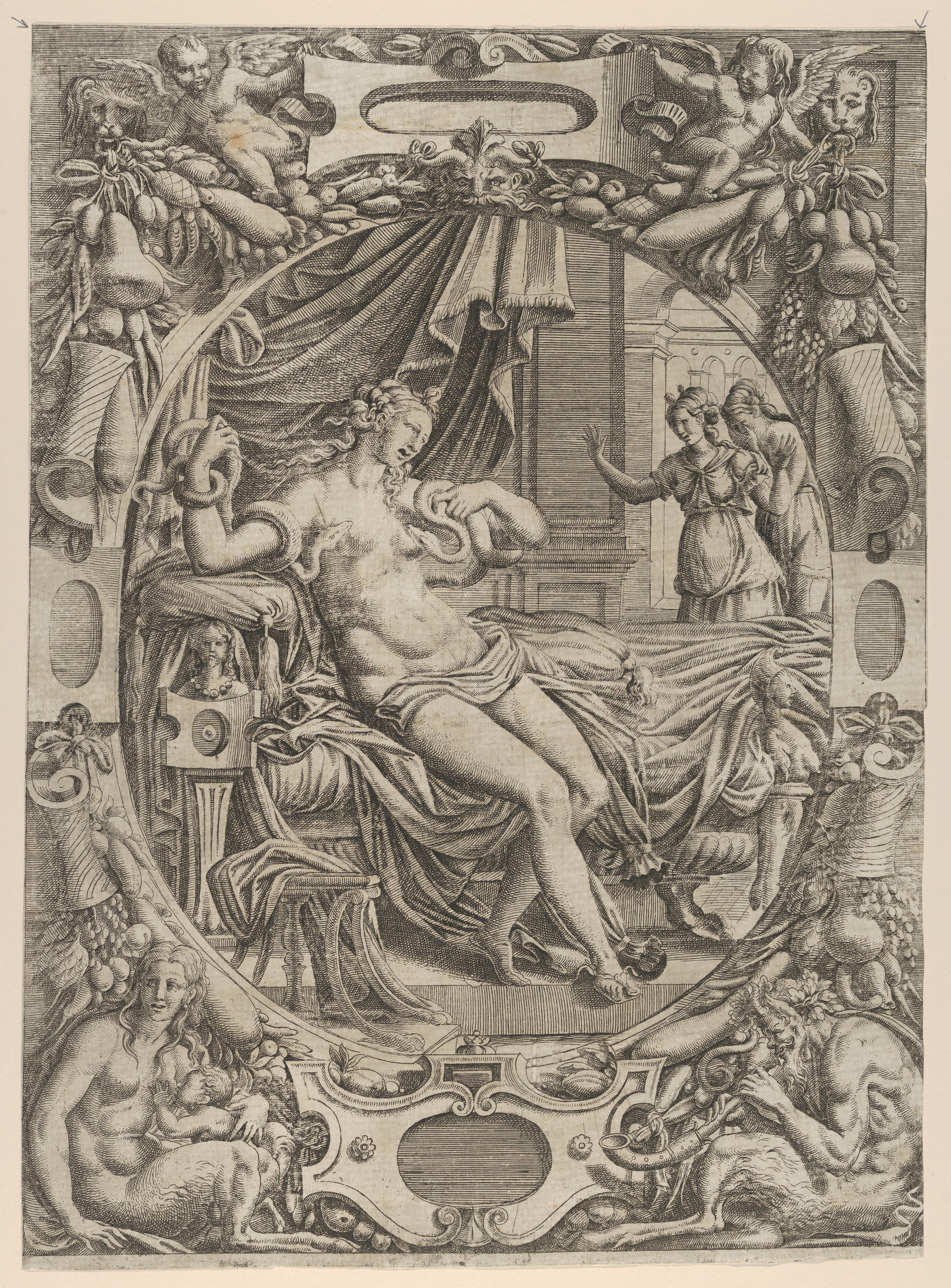
Cleopatra Bitten By an Asp

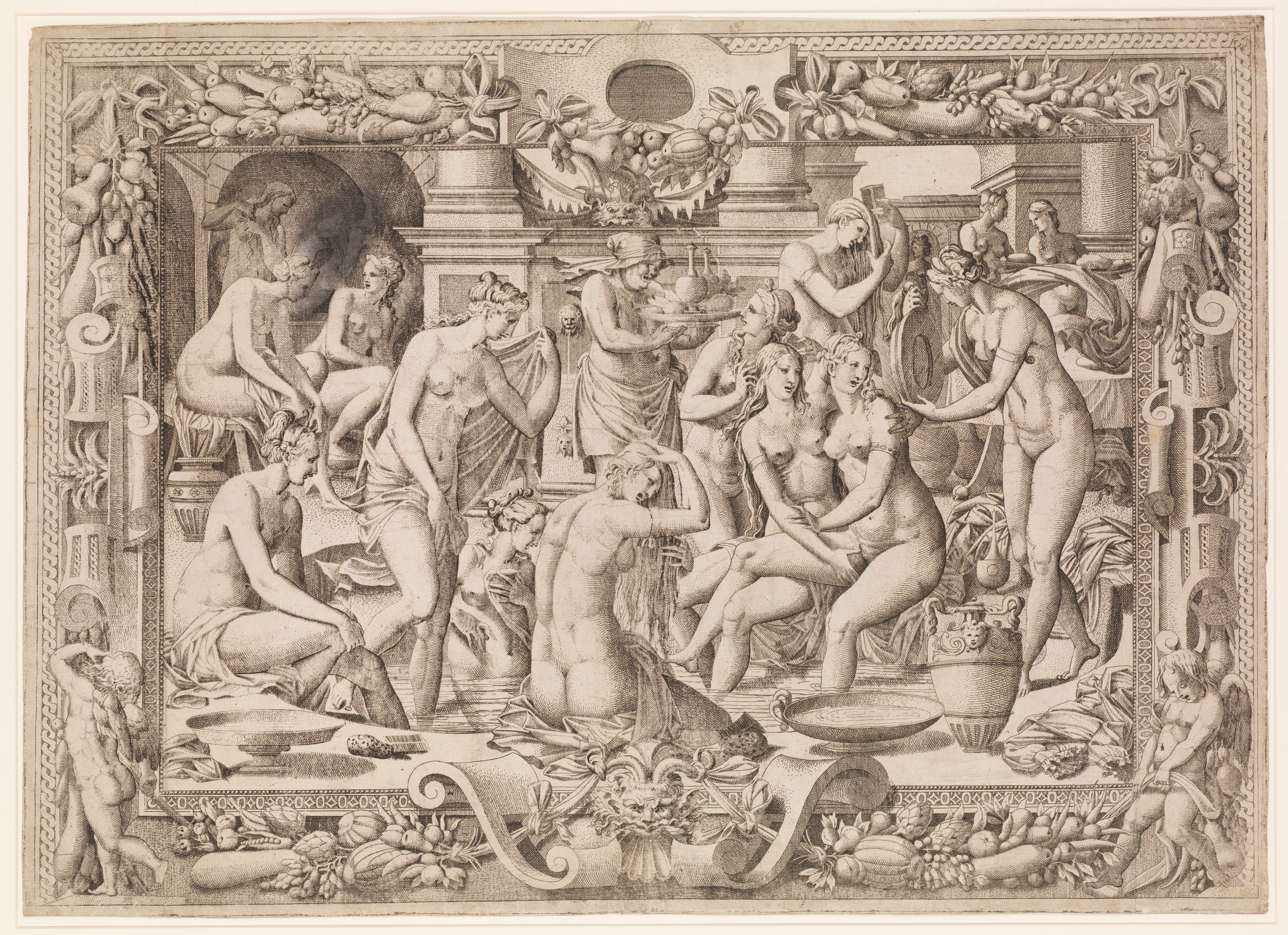
Women Bathing, late period. A typical Fontainbleau subject, to which no classical incident seems to be attached.
