= Yarkoni =

Yarkoni is a Hebrew toponymic surname signifying someone associated Yarkon River.

- Amos Yarkoni, Israeli singer
- Ravit Yarkoni, Israeli beauty queen and model
- Yafa Yarkoni, Israeli Bedouin IDF officer
