= Robert Ardito =

Australian martial artist

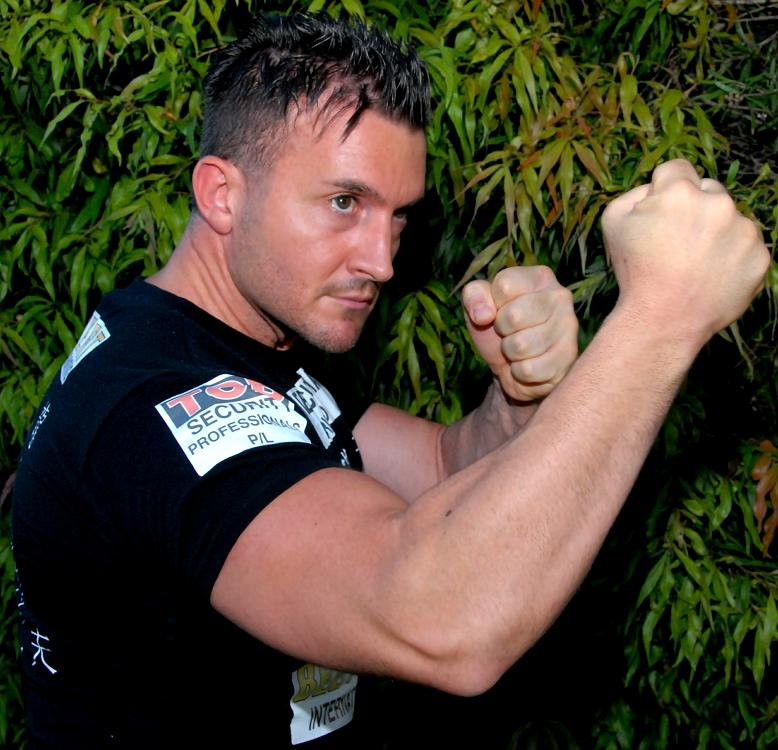
- Robert Ardito in training, 2009.
- Nationality: Australian
- Teacher: Jim Fung (馮傳強)

Other information
- Occupation: Martial Artist

Robert Ardito is an Australian martial artist. He is a former Guinness World Records holder for the Most Full Contact Punches In One Minute.

== Martial Arts career ==
Ardito studied traditional Wing Chun as a student of Sifu Jim Fung. (Note: Jim Fung was a student of Sigung (Grandmaster) Chu Shong Tin (徐尚田), of the Ip Man lineage.)

== World Record ==
In 2005, Ardito broke the record for the first time with 428 punches. In 2007, he later surpassed his previous record with 702 punches. In 2009, the record was broken for the last time by Ardito, totalling 805 punches.

In 2017, the record was broken by Norman Breese from the United States, with a total of 901 punches, where the record currently stands as of January 2022.

== Innovation Patent ==
In 2015, Ardito was granted an Innovation Patent by IP Australia upon Evolved Wing Chun. (Note: In 2021, the Innovation Patent name was changed to Ardito Defence Academy.) It is recognised as substantially contributing to the martial art of Wing Chun.
