= Arditi (disambiguation) =

Arditi is the name adopted by the Italian Army elite storm troops of World War I.

Arditi may also refer to:

- Arditi (surname)
- Arditi del Popolo ("People's Squads"), an Italian militant anti-fascist group
- A former name of the 9th Parachute Assault Regiment of the Italian Army
- Arditi (band), a Swedish martial industrial and neoclassical band

== See also ==
- Ardit
- Arditti, a surname
- Ardito (disambiguation)
