= Il Tempo =

Italian newspaper

- Quotidiano indipendente ("Independent daily newspaper")

- Front page (National edition), 16 December 2008
- Type: Daily newspaper
- Format: Berliner
- Owner: Antonio Angelucci
- Founder: Renato Angiolillo
- Editor: Daniele Capezzone
- Founded: 1944; 82 years ago
- Political alignment: Conservatism
- Language: Italian
- Headquarters: Piazza Colonna 366, Rome, Italy
- Circulation: 8,525 (July 2021)
- ISSN: 0391-6995
- Website: Il Tempo

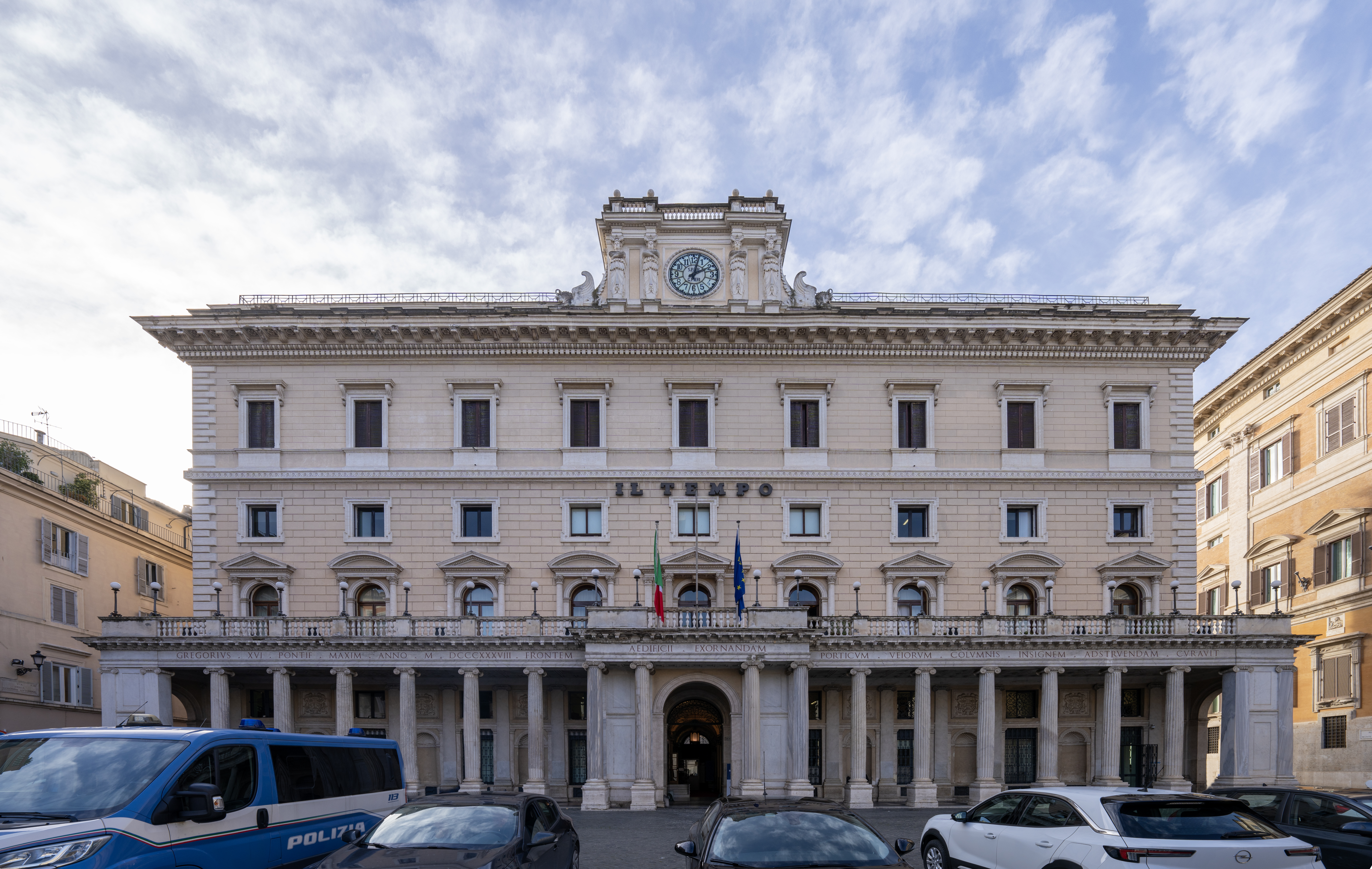
Il Tempo headquarters in Rome

Il Tempo (English: "The Time") is a daily newspaper based in the city of Rome, Italy.

== History and profile ==
Il Tempo was founded in Rome by Renato Angiolillo in 1944. At the initial phase the newspaper was a conservative publication and had an anti-communist stance. The paper publishes the Rome edition (available nationally) and other five local editions (Latina, Frosinone, northern Lazio, Abruzzo, and Molise).

In 1996 the former owner, Caltagirone Editore, sold the newspaper to the Italian builder Domenico Bonifaci. On 4 October 2007 the paper switched from broadsheet format to Berliner. Domenico Fisichella, an Italian academic and politician, is among the contributors of the daily.

The 2008 circulation of Il Tempo was 50,651 copies, and 8,525 copies in July 2021.

== Editors ==
- Renato Angiolillo (4 June 1944 – 16 August 1973)
  - Leonida Repaci (co-editor, June 1944 – December 1944)
- Gianni Letta (17 August 1973 – 17 April 1987)
- Gaspare Barbiellini Amidei (18 April 1987 – 30 May 1989)
- Franco Cangini (1 June 1989 – 20 March 1991)
- Marcello Lambertini (21 March 1991 – 6 March 1993)
- Gianni Mottola (February 1995 – 15 September 1996)
  - acting Gian Paolo Cresci (16 September 1996 – 21 October 1996)
- Maurizio Belpietro (22 October 1996 – 19 March 1997)
- Giampaolo Cresci (20 March 1997 – 8 October 1999)
- Mauro Trizzino (9 October 1999 – 2 May 2000)
- Giuseppe Sanzotta (3 May 2000 – 1 August 2001)
- Mino Allione (2 August 2001 – 1 December 2002)
- Franco Bechis (2 December 2002 – 31 January 2006)
- Gaetano Pedullà (1 February 2006 – 11 May 2007)
- Giuseppe Sanzotta (12 May 2007 – 7 December 2008)
- Roberto Arditti (8 December 2008 – 7 February 2010)
- Mario Sechi (8 February 2010 – 9 January 2013)
- Sarina Biraghi (10 January 2013 – September 2013)
- Gian Marco Chiocci (September 2013 – 18 November 2018)
- Franco Bechis (19 November 2018 – 28 February 2022)
- Davide Vecchi (1 March 2022 – 29 February 2024)
- Tommaso Cerno (1 March 2024 – 30 November 2025)
- Daniele Capezzone (1 December 2025 – currently)

== See also ==
- List of newspapers in Italy
