= Michael Barkai =

Michael (Yomi) Barkai
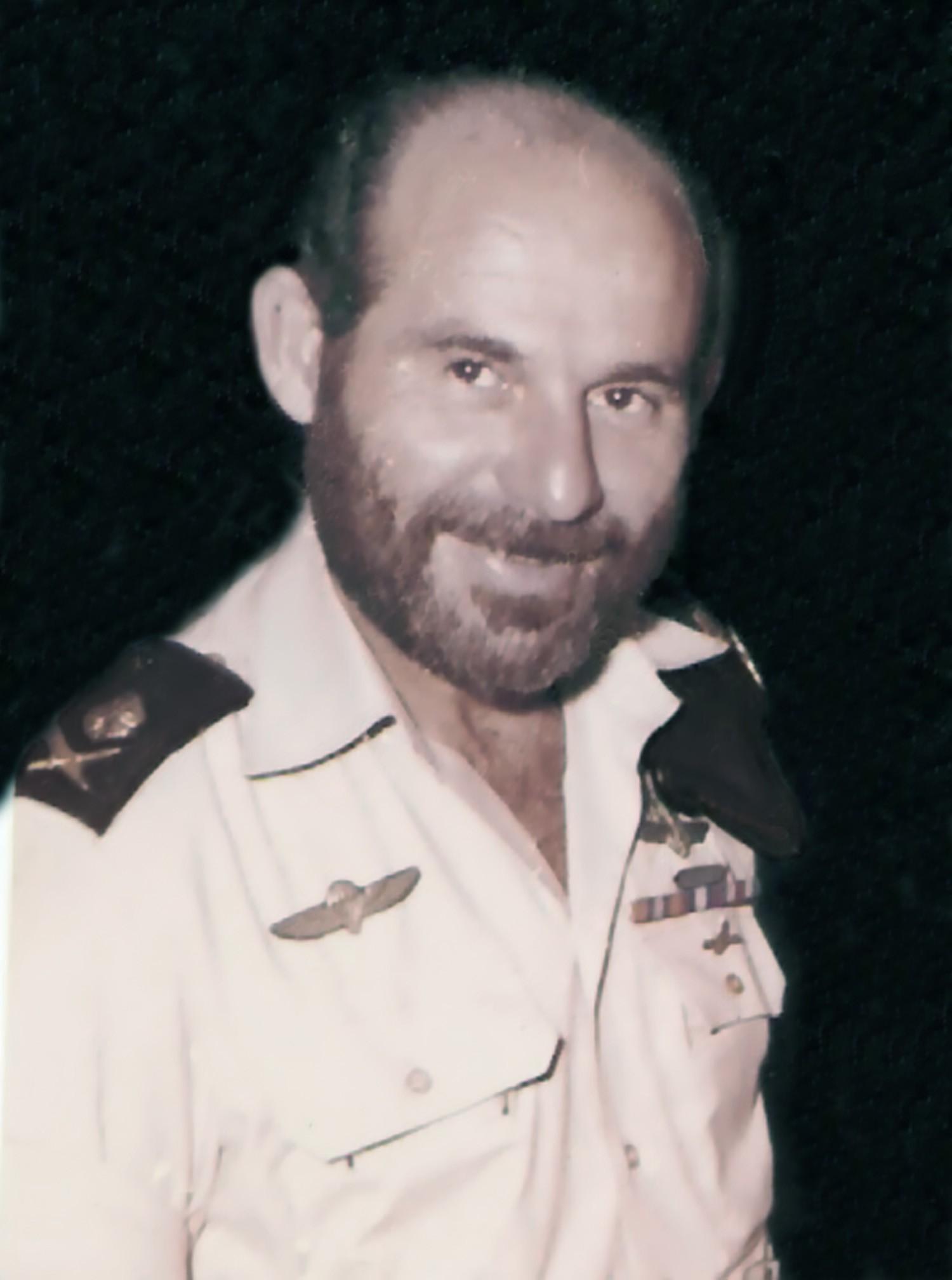
- Native name: מיכאל ברקאי
- Born: January 26, 1935; Bucharest, Kingdom of Romania
- Died: May 28, 1999 (aged 64) Israel
- Allegiance: Israel
- Branch: Israeli Navy
- Service years: 1953–1979
- Rank: Aluf
- Commands: Israeli Navy missile boats flotilla, Israeli Navy
- Conflicts: Suez Crisis; Six-Day War; War of Attrition; Yom Kippur War
- Awards: Medal of Distinguished Service

Michael (Yomi) Barkai (Hebrew: מיכאל ברקאי; January 26, 1935 – May 28, 1999) was the Commander of the Israeli Navy, a recipient of the Medal of Distinguished Service for his command of the missile ships during the Yom Kippur War.

== Biography ==
=== Childhood ===
Barkai was born in Bucharest, the capital of Romania, as a first born of Moshe and Rachel Borsok. As a boy, he experienced the persecution and violence directed against the local Jewish community by the National Legionary State and the Ion Antonescu regime. In December 1947, his family tried to make aliyah to Palestine, but their ship was caught by the British and they were sent to the Cyprus internment camps, as the British prohibited Jews emigration to Palestine under the White Paper of 1939. When Israel declared its independence, his family finally arrived in Israel and settled in Bat Yam. In Bat Yam, Barkai realized his love for the sea.

=== Service in the Israeli Navy ===
In 1953, Barkai enlisted in the Israeli Ground Forces in the Engineer (Sapper) Corps. He entered the Officer School for the Israeli Navy in 1956 and was commissioned in 1957.

In 1958, he married his wife Rachel, the couple subsequently had two children.

In 1959, Barkai volunteered to join the Israeli Navy's submarine unit and quickly became captain of a submarine. His expertise and military genius made him a common advisor in the Israeli Navy headquarters under the Command of Shlomo Arel. By the late 1960s, Barkai was stationed for a brief time in the Naval quarters in Ashdod until in 1971 he was put in charge of the missile ship fleet. during the Yom Kippur War Barkai's military strategies and genius helped turn the tide of the war for the Israelis. Barkai managed to scare the Egyptian and Syrian navies so much that, by the end of the war, their ships would not leave the harbor (see Battle of Latakia and Battle of Baltim). For his heroism, Barkai received the Medal of Distinguished Service, which he accepted on behalf of all the Israeli missile ship fighters.

In 1974, Barkai was stationed at the Israeli Naval headquarters and in 1976, at the rank of Aluf, Barkai became the Commander of the Israeli Navy. Barkai continued to build the Israeli Navy, under his command the Israeli Navy received the Gal class submarines and commissioned the building of two new corvettes. Barkai completely reorganized the sloppy command of the Israeli Navy into a great command.

In 1979 Barkai was tried by a military tribunal for an alleged rape of a female non-commissioned officer. He was acquitted due to lack of corroborating evidence but was relieved of his command by Defence Minister Ezer Weizman.

== After military service ==
Barkai and his wife Rachel moved to Greece where they built the yacht "Leviathan." With it they sailed around the world, returning to Israel only in 1995. In 1999, Barkai was diagnosed with cancer and began chemotherapy. At the same time, he was invited by the Navy to teach military strategies to IDF soldiers. Although he was weak, he immediately took the job.

On 28 May 1999, Alex Tal, Commander of the Israeli Navy, personally called to inform Barkai that the American search team had found submarine INS Dakar, which had sunk three kilometers underwater on its way to Israel, killing all crew members, including Barkai's brother, Maj. Avraham Barkai. That same day Barkai committed suicide.

His friend Yigal Tumarkin said that "you couldn't hate Barkai and it was seven times harder to love him."
