= Ardito =

Ardito may refer to:

- Ardito-class destroyer, class of destroyers of Italian Regia Marina
- Ardito (name), a given name and surname

== See also ==
- Arditi (disambiguation)
