= Jim Fung =

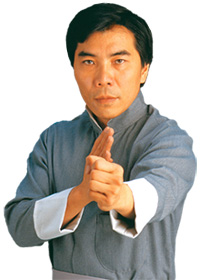
- Jim Fung
- Born: Fung Chuen Keung (馮傳強); 16 May 1944; Hong Kong
- Died: 18 March 2007 (aged 62); Sydney, Australia; Cancer
- Native name: 馮傳強
- Style: Wing Chun
- Teacher: Tsui Seung Tin (徐尚田),
- Rank: Grandmaster

Other information
- Website: www.wingchun.com.au

Fung Chuen Keung (馮傳強; 16 May 1944 – 18 March 2007), known as Jim Fung, was a practitioner and teacher of Wing Chun kung fu and founder of the 'International Wing Chun Academy'. He had been training under his master, Tsui Seung Tin (徐尚田), since 1960.

== Accomplishments ==
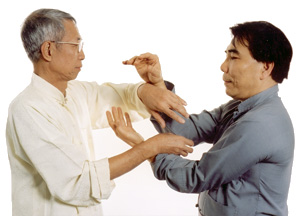
Tsui and Fung engage in Chi Sau

Jim Fung immigrated to Australia from Hong Kong in his late teens and studied accountancy and law at the University of Adelaide, graduating with a bachelor's degree in accounting. He is the author of two books, Wing Chun Kung Fu and Wing Chun Weapons, and produced a teaching video titled "Wing Chun", in 1985.

Jim Fung demonstrates the Wing Chun thrust kick

Fung was chosen to represent Chinese kung fu at the International Grandmasters' Martial Arts Exhibition in Adelaide, Australia, in 1989. However, he says the greatest honour thus far was having his academy officially recognised by the Chinese government and world ruling body for Chinese martial arts in the All China Martial Arts Register published in 1998.

In 1999, Fung was conferred the title of Grandmaster by Chu Shong Tin.

== Death ==
Fung had cancer and died in Sydney on 18 March 2007.

== See also ==
- Ip Man
