= Dan Shomron =

Israeli Chief of Staff (1937–2008)

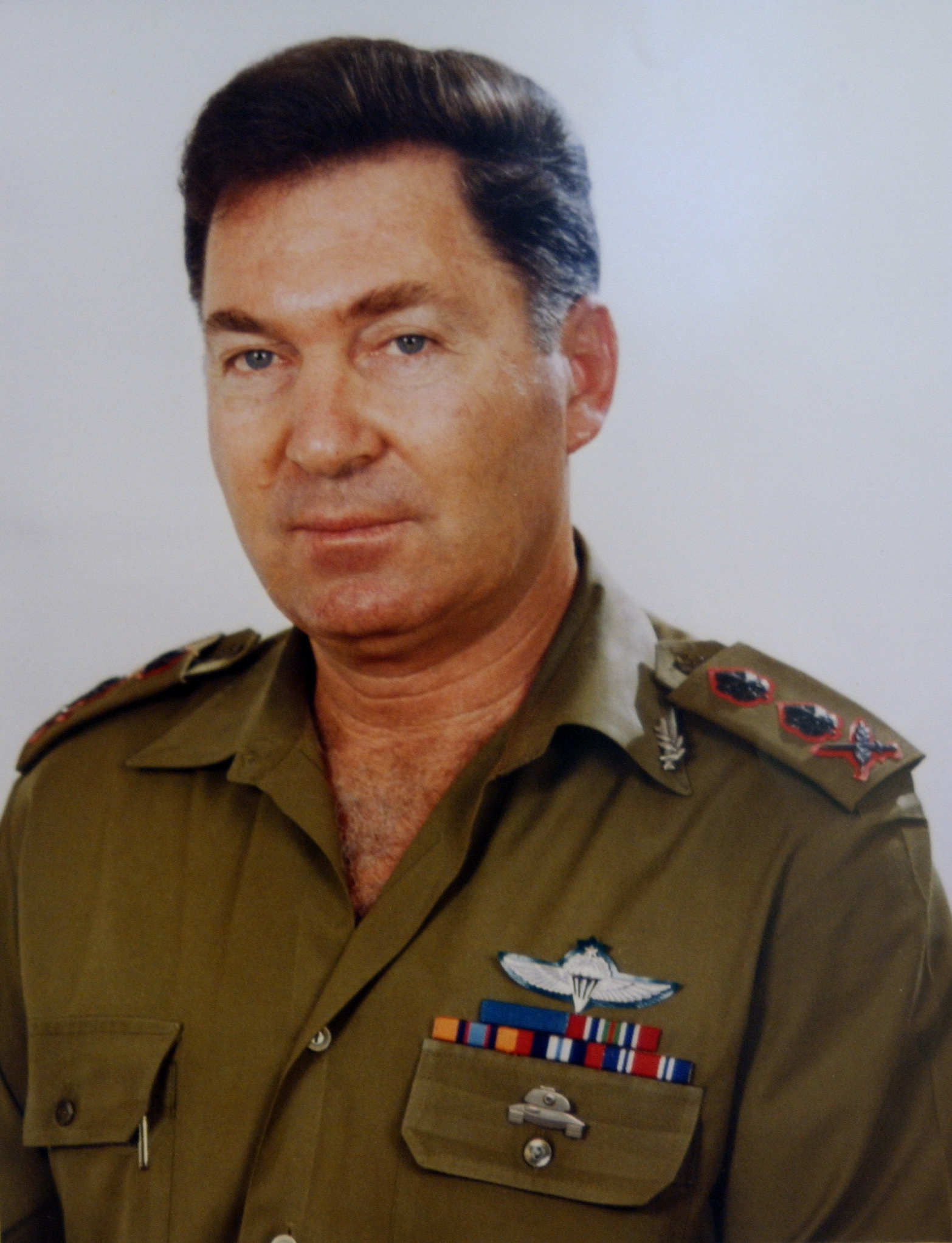
- Native name: דן שומרון
- Born: August 5, 1937; Ashdot Ya'akov, Mandatory Palestine
- Died: February 26, 2008 (aged 70) Herzliya, Israel
- Allegiance: Israel
- Branch: Israel Defense Forces
- Service years: 1955–1991
- Rank: Rav Aluf (Chief of Staff; highest rank)
- Commands: Nahal Brigade, Paratroopers Brigade, Commander GOC Army Headquarters, Commander of the IDF
- Conflicts: Suez Crisis; Six-Day War; War of Attrition; Yom Kippur War; Operation Entebbe; 1982 Lebanon War; South Lebanon conflict First Intifada
- Awards: Medal of Distinguished Service
- Other work: Chairman of Israeli Military Industries

Lieutenant General Daniel Shomron (Hebrew: דן שומרון; August 5, 1937 – February 26, 2008) was the 13th Chief of Staff of the Israel Defense Forces (IDF), from 1987 to 1991.

== Biography ==
Shomron was the eldest of three children of Tova and Eliyahu Dozorets-Shimron from Kibbutz Ashdot Ya'akov. He enlisted in the IDF in 1955, and volunteered for the Paratrooper brigade. He was assigned to Battalion 890. During his enlistment, his surname was mistakenly noted as Shomron. He underwent the paratrooper combat training, and then went to the infantry squad commander course, during which he participated in several operations, including the raid on the Jordanian police building in A-Rahwe, Operation Gulliver and Operation Lulav.

Shomron was a squad commander during the 1956 Sinai campaign. After the Sinai war, Shomron completed Infantry Officers Course and served as a platoon commander in his brigade. In 1959 he finished his military service and returned to his kibbutz to work as a truck driver until 1962. He re-enlisted in 1962 and was assigned as a company commander in the paratrooper battalion of the Nahal Brigade. In 1964, he served as deputy commander of the 202 battalion. In 1966 he was appointed as the acting battalion commander after the Yoav Shaham, the battalion commander, was killed during Operation Shreder in the As-Samu village. Later in the year, Shomron began his studies in the IDF's Inter-Services Command and Staff College.

During the Six-Day War, he commanded a unit on the Egyptian front, and was the first paratrooper to reach the Suez Canal. He was decorated with the Medal of Distinguished Service for this action. In 1974, Shomron received the command over the Infantry Corps and Paratroopers Brigade of the IDF. He planned and commanded Operation Entebbe in 1976, during which Yonatan Netanyahu (brother of Prime Minister Benjamin Netanyahu) was killed fulfilling his duty as breaching force commander. Although Shomron was proclaimed a hero for that role, he did not always feel comfortable with that appellation, saying:

I also felt some kind of envy from the military and it was not comfortable for me. Around the world, until today, they look at me like something from a different world, a super super-hero, something not natural. I don't like that feeling of being an advertisement.

When asked what he most remembered about Operation Entebbe and the rescuing of the hostages, he said,

When the hostages board the evacuation plane, are helped up, each one checking his family that everyone is present. That was a strong moment that I can't forget.

In 1978, Shomron was in charge of the evacuation and dismantling of Yamit and army bases in the Sinai Peninsula, which occurred within the framework of the Camp David Accords with Egypt.

In 1983, Shomron established the ground forces command, to be in charge of the infantry, tanks, artillery and engineer corps. He was its first commander.

In 1987, Shomron became the 13th Chief of Staff of the IDF, holding this position until 1991. After finishing his term, he served as the Chairman of the Israeli Military Industries.

Dan Shomron died on February 26, 2008, at a hospital in Herzliya, Israel from complications of a brain aneurysm that struck him three weeks earlier. He was 70-years-old.

Shomron was played by Harris Yulin in the film Victory at Entebbe (1976). He was portrayed by Charles Bronson in Raid on Entebbe (1977), and Arik Lavie in Operation Thunderbolt (1977). He was played by Vincent Riotta in the 2018 film Entebbe.

== Recognition ==
In 1973, he received the Medal of Distinguished Service as a Maj. as a result of his actions during the Six Day War.

In 1977, he received the Golden Plate Award of the American Academy of Achievement.

In 2009, the Kinneret Center on Peace, Security and Society was renamed The Dan Shomron Center for Society, Security and Peace.

== See also ==
- List of Israel's Chiefs of the General Staff of IDF
