= Robert Arditti =

British actor, singer and dancer

Robert Arditti

Robert Arditti (born 5 March 1946) is an English director, choreographer and actor, singer, dancer of stage, television, and movies. His most notable feature is his red hair. He was born in London. Among his most prominent roles was playing Baby John in the original London production of West Side Story.

In 1956, at ten years of age, he was enrolled at the Ballet Rambert School in London where he trained for Classical Ballet. Robert was born into an artistic family. His mother had been an actress, singer and dancer. His father had studied the classical violin.

After two years, his mother felt that he should learn other forms of dance, together with acting and singing. He was taken to a stage school, where he studied Ballet, Jazz, Tap and mime with Acting in the L.A.M.D.A. style.

His Classical dance training was taken over in part by Isobelle Florence, and by Tamara Karsavina, the famous dance partner of Vaslav Nijinsky. By the age of twelve, Robert had become a child actor, singer, dancer, appearing in many television, film, radio and theatre productions. These included such movies as: Carry On Teacher, Carry On Regardless and Bottoms Up.

By the age of fourteen his career took a major change in direction. He was engaged to play the role of Baby John in the original stage production of West Side Story which had transferred from Broadway to Her Majesty's Theatre in London. This was certainly a culture shock but became one of the most important influences in his entire career.

Following this, Robert appeared in many musical films and theatre shows together with a string of Television Series and Specials. However, somewhere deep inside him, he felt there was something he had not completed. This led to his joining The Russian Federation of Classical Ballet as their Principal Dancer, at the age of nineteen. During this period he danced such roles as: Sigfried in Swan Lake and Albrect in Giselle. He stayed with the Ballet Company for approximately eighteen months, in which he managed to exorcise the old desire he started with, of being a Classical-Dancer.

Robert then returned to what had become his first love: the musical. This was followed by many theatre, television and motion picture engagements such as: Victor/Victoria, Chitty Chitty Bang Bang, Goodbye Mr Chips and The Slipper and the Rose. The progression of his career continued and Robert soon found himself in the driving seat as a Director/Choreographer. He directed the very first musical he had ever appeared in, West Side Story, thus bringing his career full circle.

He went on to direct and choreograph many theatre productions such as: Illya Darling, The Boy Friend, Grease, Underneath the Arches, Something's Afoot, Salad Days, Ain't Misbehavin', Robert and Elizabeth, The Music Biz, and many more.
