= Giacomo Arditi =

Italian historian, economist and writer (1815–1891)

The marquess Giacomo Arditi of Castelvetere (21 March 1815, in Presicce – July 1891) was an Italian historian, economist and writer, nephew of the archaeologist Michele Arditi.

== Overview ==
Giacomo Arditi is best known for his work La Corografia fisica et storica della provincia di Terra d'Otranto, the most ponderous encyclopedic work that has ever succeeded to provide a complete portrait of the province of Salento, the unification of Italy, and the proclamation of Rome as the capital of the Kingdom of Italy. Arditi was the member of numerous academies, member of the Archaeological Commission of the province of Lecce, being royal inspector of antiquities and monuments, President of the Provincial Deputation and Vice-intendent of the District of Gallipoli.

== Works ==
- La Corografia fisica et storica della provincia di Terra d'Otranto (1849)
- La Leuca Salentina (1875)
