= Medal of Distinguished Service =

Israeli military decoration

Medal of Distinguished Service עיטור המופת
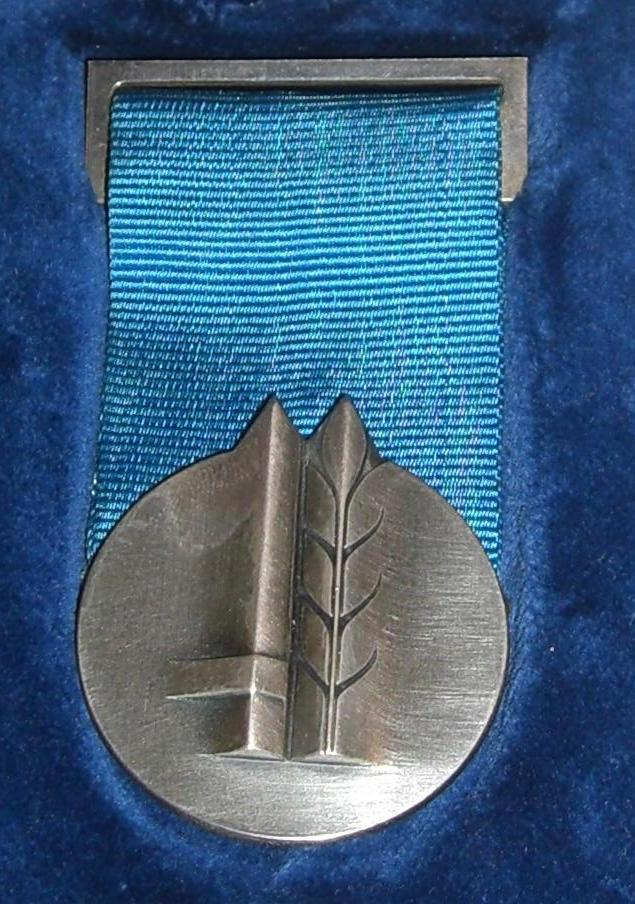
- Type: Military decoration
- Awarded for: Distinguished Service to Israel
- Presented by: Israel Defense Forces
- Eligibility: Soldiers of the Israel Defense Forces
- Status: Currently awarded
- Established: 1970; 56 years ago
- Ribbon bar of the medal

Precedence
- Next (higher): Medal of Courage
- Next (lower): Chief of Staff (Ramatkal) Citation

The Medal of Distinguished Service (Hebrew: עיטור המופת) is an Israeli military decoration. The Medal of Distinguished Service is the third most important medal given by the IDF Chief of General Staff for an act that is done with courage and worthy of exemplary service.

== Overview ==
The medal was instituted in 1970 by act of law in the Knesset and could also be awarded for actions performed before 1970. This medal is the only one of the three medals awarded by the State of Israel for exemplary conduct that can be granted for actions outside the battlefield. It consists of a blue ribbon bearing a metal circle with a sword in its center alongside wheat, two symbols that were used by the fighting organizations of Jewish communities before the country was founded in 1948. They represent the work of the pioneers and their defense of the homeland.

To date, 601 medals have been awarded, the latest in 2015. Five recipients have been awarded the medal twice. One unit, the reconnaissance battalion of the Givati Brigade was awarded the medal in 2005.

== Design ==
The medal was designed by Dan Reisinger; its shape is circular.

On the front of the medal is a sword with an olive branch, symbolizing controlled strength. The reverse is plain.

The medal is attached to a blue ribbon, with two-time recipients of the medal wearing a small clasp in the form of the medal on its ribbon.

The medal is minted by the Israel Government Coins and Medals Corporation; it is made from 25 gram silver/935 and the clasp is chrome plated metal.

== Notable recipients ==
- Ehud Barak, one of the most decorated soldiers in the IDF
- Israel Baharav, received the Medal for his leadership in the Yom Kippur War
- Yonatan Netanyahu, received the Medal for his actions in the Yom Kippur War
- Amos Yarkoni, received the Medal after his retirement for his years of courageous service in fighting terrorists on Israel's borders
- Amram Mitzna, received the Medal for his actions in the Six-Day War
- Dan Shomron, received the Medal for his actions in the 1956 Sinai War
- Ephraim Eitam, received the Medal for his actions in the Yom Kippur War
- Esther Arditi, the only female recipient of the Medal
- Giora Epstein, received the Medal for his actions as IAF pilot in the Six-Day War and Yom Kippur War - 17 confirmed aerial victories)
- Michael Barkai, received the Medal for his actions in the Yom Kippur War as a commander of missile ships
- Michael Burt, two-time recipient
- Nechemya Cohen, one of the most decorated soldiers in the IDF
- Shlomo Hagani, two-time recipient
- Zevulun Orlev, received the Medal for his actions in the Yom Kippur War
- Avigdor Kahalani, received the Medal for his actions in the Six-Day War, also received the Medal of Valor for his actions in the Yom Kippur War
