= Ardit =

Ardit is an Albanian given name for males meaning "golden day." People named Ardit include:

- Ardit Aliti (born 1996), Albanian-Danish rapper
- Ardit Beqiri (born 1979), Albanian footballer
- Ardit Deliu (born 1997), Albanian footballer
- Ardit Gashi (born 1998), Albanian footballer
- Ardit Gjebrea (born 1963), Albanian singer
- Ardit Hila (born 1993), Albanian footballer
- Ardit Hoxhaj (born 1994), Albanian footballer
- Ardit Krymi (born 1996), Albanian footballer
- Ardit Peposhi (born 1993), Albanian footballer
- Ardit Shaqiri (born 1985), Macedonian footballer
- Ardit Shehaj (born 1990), Albanian footballer
- Ardit Tahiri (born 2002), Kosovan footballer
- Ardit Toli (born 1997), Albanian footballer
