= Esther Arditi =

Israeli paramedic (1937-2003)

- אסתר ארדיטי
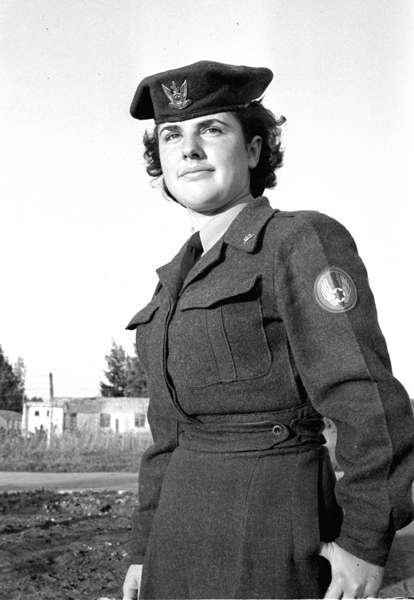
- Arditi in 1955
- Born: 1937; Sofia, Tsardom of Bulgaria
- Died: 20 February 2003 (aged 65–66)
- Awards: Medal of Distinguished Service

Esther Arditi (Hebrew: אסתר ארדיטי; 1937 – 20 February 2003), also known as "The Angel in White," was a medic in the Israel Defense Forces, and the only woman to be awarded the Israeli Medal of Distinguished Service.

== Early life and education ==
Arditi was born in 1937 in Sofia, Bulgaria, but grew up in Italy during the Second World War. After graduating from high school, she immigrated to Israel and enlisted in the Israeli Air Force.

== Career ==
A week after earning her medic certification in 1954, Arditi saved combat pilot Yaakov Salomon and navigator Shlomo Hertzman from a burning Mosquito FB6 which had been struck by lightning while landing in a storm. She began to steer an ambulance to the scene but it became stuck in mud caused by the storm. Arditi abandoned the ambulance and ran on foot towards the burning plane where she pulled out the injured crew just before it exploded. As a result of her heroism, she became the first and only female soldier to be awarded the Israeli Medal of Distinguished Service.

She continued her military involvement during the Six-Day War and Yom Kippur War, where she volunteered as a medic in a field hospital. Her achievements in the military earned her the nickname "Angel in White," which stayed with her until she died of cardiac arrest on 20 February 2003.
