= Term (architecture) =

Pillar with human head and bust

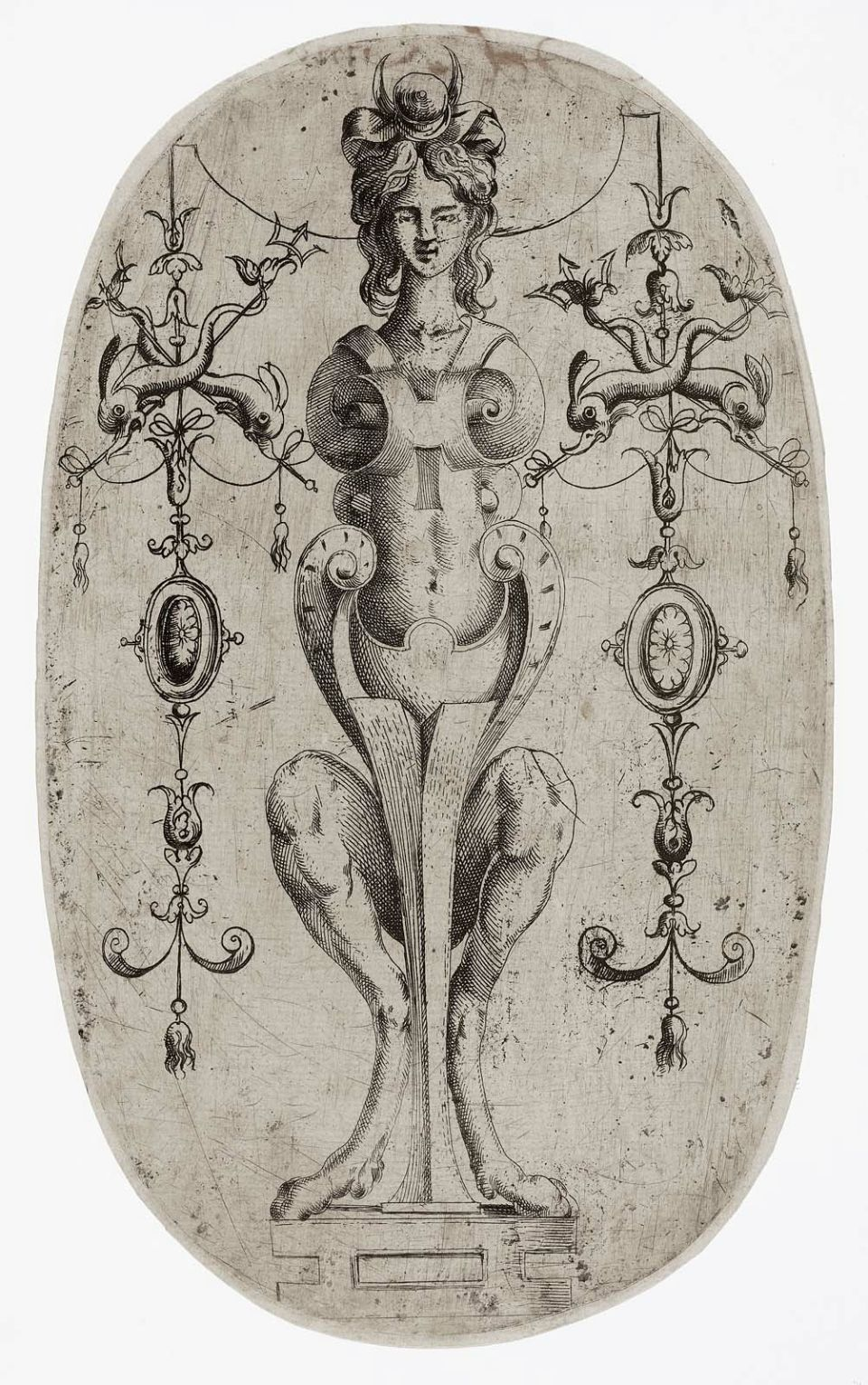
Terminal Figure: Sphinx with crescent in her hair, Jean Mignon, 1540s

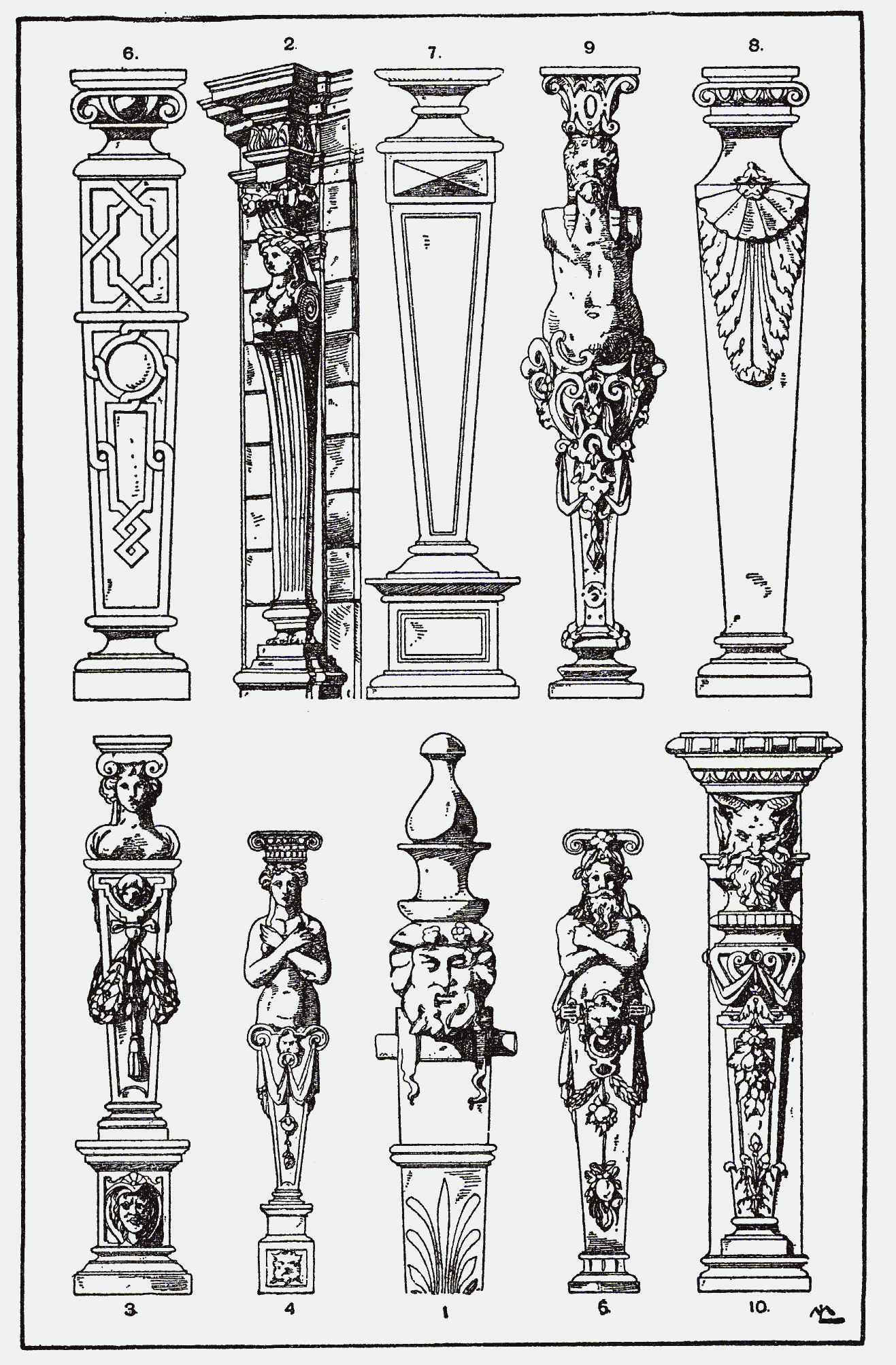
Terminal figures (4, 6 and 9, to be strict) copied from French and Antwerp 16th-century Mannerist pattern books.

In Classical architecture and in art a term or terminal figure (pl.: terms or termini) is a human head and bust that continues down as a square tapering pillar-like form. It is usually distinguished from a herm, which has a head and shoulders only, but the two words may be used rather loosely and interchangeably.

The god Terminus was the Etruscan and Roman deity of boundaries, and classical sources say that boundary markers often took the form of a half-figure of the god on a pillar, though ancient survivals in this form are extremely rare.

In the architecture and the painted architectural decoration of the European Renaissance and the succeeding Classical styles, term figures are quite common. Often they represent minor deities associated with fields and vineyards and the edges of woodland, Pan and fauns and Bacchantes especially, and they may be draped with garlands of fruit and flowers.

Term figures were a particularly characteristic feature of the 16th-century style in furniture and carved interior decoration that is called Antwerp Mannerism. Ornament prints, such as a set of 20 School of Fontainebleau etchings from the 1540s usually given to Jean Mignon, disseminated the style through Germany and England. In these very fanciful Mannerist creations, many of the forms dip in and out of architectural and anatomical shapes.
