= Ardit Shaqiri =

Retired Macedonian footballer

Personal information
- Full name: Ardit Shaqiri; Ардит Шаќири
- Date of birth: 4 May 1985 (age 41)
- Place of birth: Struga, SFR Yugoslavia
- Height: 1.83 m (6 ft 0 in)
- Position: Midfielder

Youth career
- Dinamo Zagreb

Senior career*
Years	Team	Apps	(Gls)
2004–2006	Teuta Durrës	48	(3)
2006	Karaorman		
2007–2008	Vukovar '91	13	(0)
2008–2010	Gramozi	38	(8)
2010–2011	Ružomberok	9	(2)
2011	Ohrid	7	(0)
2012	Korabi Debar		
2012	Drita Bogovinje	16	(1)
2013–2014	Shkëndija	12	(3)
2014	Sloboda Tuzla	27	(9)
2015	Wangen b.O.		
2016	Mladost C.D.	13	(1)
2016–2021	Struga	8	(0)
- * Club domestic league appearances and goals as of 8 Nov. 2021

Ardit Shaqiri (Macedonian: Ардит Шаќири, romanized: Ardit Šaćiri; born 4 May 1985, in Struga) is a retired Macedonian-Albanian football midfielder.

== Personal life ==
He is the cousin of former Macedonian international Artim Šakiri.
