= Roberto Arditti =

Italian journalist (1965–2026)

- Born: 28 August 1965; Lodi, Italy
- Died: 2 April 2026 (aged 60); Rome, Italy
- Education: Bocconi University
- Occupation: Journalist

Roberto Arditti (28 August 1965 – 2 April 2026) was an Italian journalist. He was the editor of Il Tempo. His funeral was held at the Church of St. Ignatius of Loyola at Campus Martius in Rome. Arditti died on 2 April 2026, at the age of 60.
