= Michele Arditi =

Italian lawyer, antiquarian and archaeologist

The marquess Michele Arditi (13 September 1746, in Presicce – 23 April 1838, in Naples) was an Italian lawyer, antiquarian and archaeologist, uncle of the historian Giacomo Arditi.

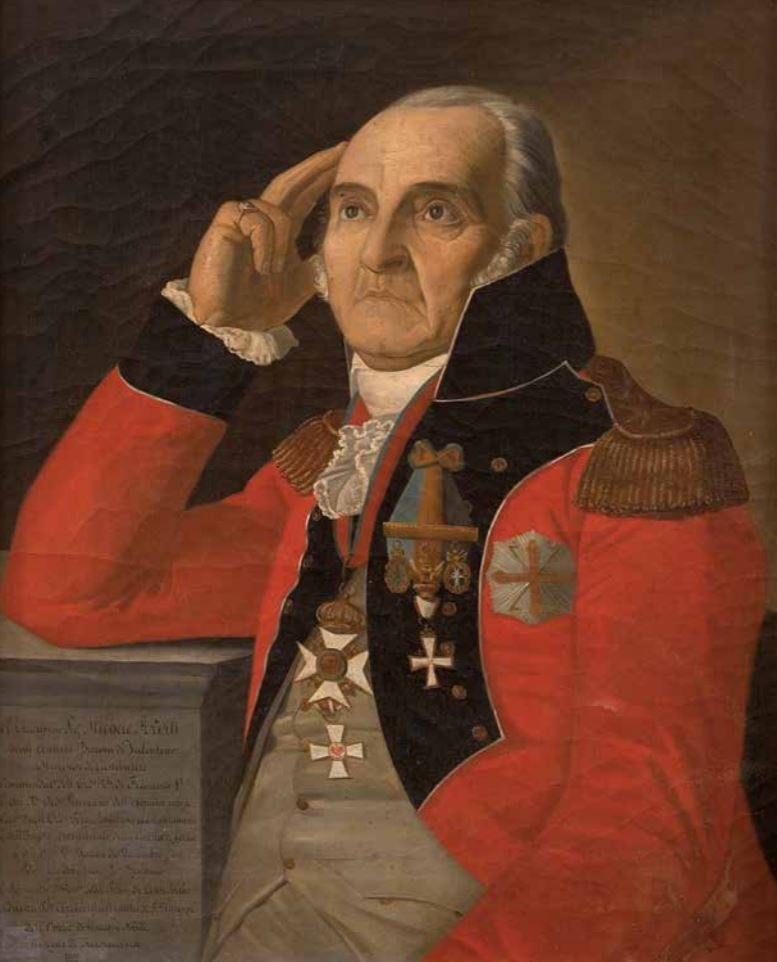

Michele Ariditi was known for his outstanding skills in archaeology. In 1807, the Kingdom of Naples had taken initiatives to revive archaeological investigations in Naples. Arditi was appointed as Director of the Royal Museum and Superintendent of Excavations, and was charged with the task of developing a new integrated plan for the development of the excavations in the Kingdom. This meant reviving the work at Pompeii, Herculaneum, and Paestum, as well as bringing into focus work at the sites north of Naples, for example at Pozzuoli and the area around Cuma.

== Works ==
- Illustrazione di un antico verso trovato nelle ruine di Locri (1791)
- Il Porto Di Miseno (1808)
- L'Ermatena ossia la impronta da darsi al gettone della regal societa (1816)
- La legge Petronia illustrata col mezzo di un' antica inscrizione rinvenuta nell'Anfiteatro di Pompei (1817)
- Ulisse che giunto nella Sicilia di studia d'imbriacar Polifemo (1817)
- La Epifania degli Dei appo gli antichi (1819)
- Il Fascino, e l'amuleto contro del fascino presso gli antichi (1825)

== Bibliography ==
- Giacomo Ardidi, La corografia fisica e storica della provincia di terra d'Otranto (Pressice, paragraph monograph on the life and all the works of Michele Arditi), Tipografia Scipione Ammirato (Lecce), 1879 (2nd ed. 1885).
