= Chu Shong-tin =

Chinese martial artist

- 徐尚田
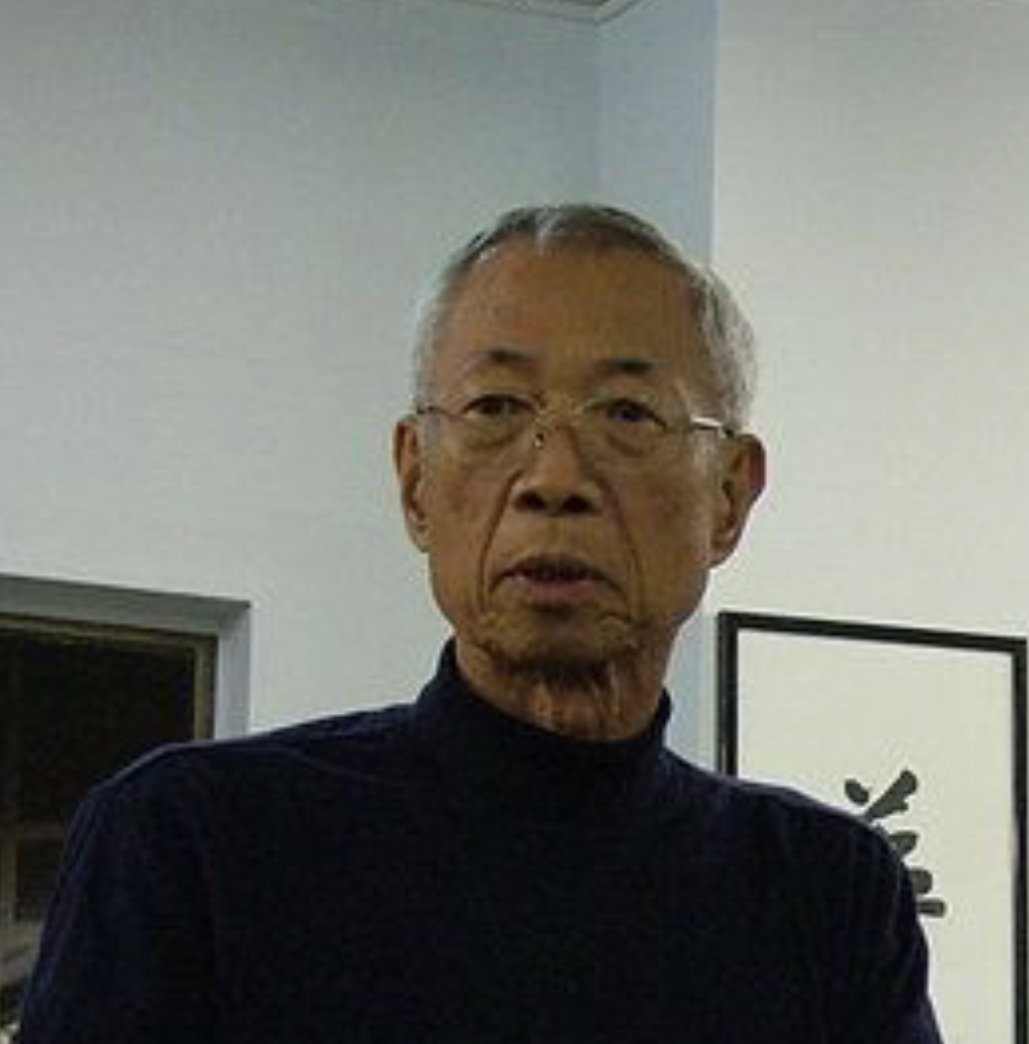
- Born: June 6, 1933
- Died: July 28, 2014 (aged 81)
- Known for: Wing Chun Kung Fu Master
- Style: Wing Chun
- Title: Sigung (Grandmaster)
- Website: https://www.cstalumni.hk/en/about.html

Chu Shong-tin (also Tsui Sheung-tin or Toi Shan-tien) (Chinese: 徐尚田; Jyutping: ceoi^{4} soeng^{6} tin^{4}; 1933–2014) was grand master of Wing Chun kung fu who had lived in Hong Kong. He was the third student of the famous teacher Yip Man, and remained at Yip Man's school to become his senior instructor.

== Biography ==
Chu Shong-tin was born in Guangzhou China on 13 May 1933 and moved to Hong Kong in 1949. He started work as the secretary of the Hong Kong and Kowloon Restaurant Workers Union where he met Master Ip Man, who was teaching Wing Chun Kung Fu to members of the union. The two became friends and in 1951 Chu became the third student of Master Ip after Leung Sheung and Lok Yiu. Chu Shong-tin trained and eventually taught continuously from 1951 until his passing in 2014.

Early on, Chu questioned Master Ip about the meaning of the first Wing Chun form name - Siu Nim Tau - and was just told "keep practicing". He persevered in only practicing this first form and eventually "felt something different while practicing. A sort of understanding that was not there before." He told his Master about his experience and Ip Man started to call him "Siu Nim Tau Wong (小念頭王)" or "Siu Nim Tau King ".

In 1977, the martial art magazine Secret's of Kung Fu (distributed in Australia, the U.K, the US and France) stated "The four most highly-achieved exponents of the Wing Chun School at Present are Sifu Liang Hsiang (Leung Sheung), Sifu Lo Yao (Lok Yiu), Sifu Huang Ch'un-Liang (Wong Shun-leung) and Sifu Hsu Shang-t'ien (Chu Shong-tin). They have all been given an in-depth teaching of true learning by Ip Man and are well-known in martial art circles."

In 1988, Chu Shong-tin was invited to Australia to represent Wing Chun (Ving Tsun) Chinese Kung Fu at the 1988 International Ancient Martial Arts and Cultural Exhibition In 1992, the first trip to represent Ving Tsun (Wing Chun) back to mainland China, to the birthplace of Ving Tsun, Foshan, was organized by Master Ip Chun ( Master Ip Man's son) of The Ving Tsun Athletic Association. The trip was led Master's Chu Shong-tin, Wong Shun-leung, Ip Ching, and others.

Chu Shong-tin was on the Ving Tsun Athletic Association Board of Directors from 1997 to 1999 and 2002 - 2004 (serving as Chairman of the Board in 1999) In 1999, as Chairman of the VTAA Board, Master Chu, along with Ip Man's sons (Master Ip Chin and Master Ip Chun) realized a dream that Master Ip had had 38 years before, to organise a conference of Ving Tsun (Wing Chun) practitioners from all over the world.
