= The Arts Fuse =

Online arts magazine

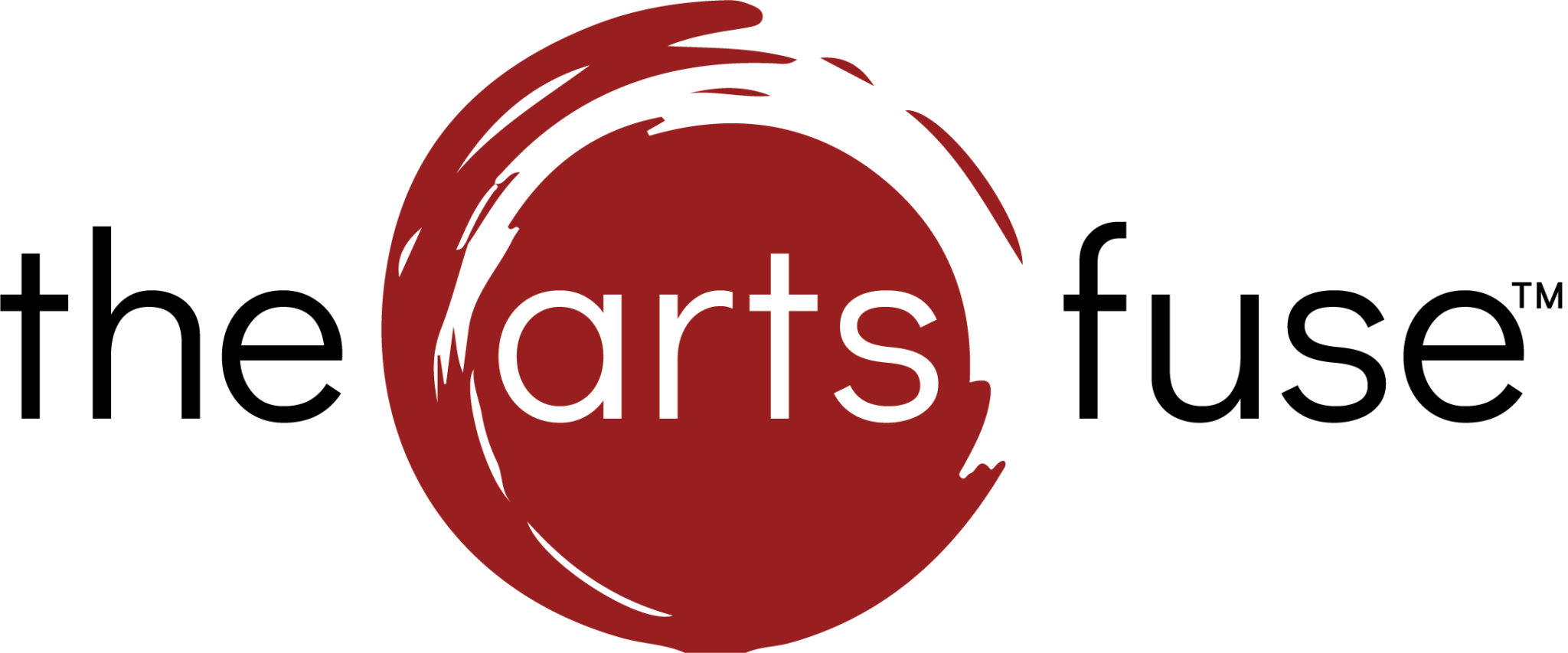
- Website type: arts, magazine, journalism
- Owners: Global Narratives, Inc.
- Creators: Bill Marx, Editor-in-Chief
- Website: artsfuse.org
- Commercial: No
- Launched: 2007

The Arts Fuse is an online arts magazine covering cultural events in Greater Boston, as well as Connecticut, Maine, Massachusetts, New Hampshire, Rhode Island, Vermont, and New York.

The Arts Fuse has published more than 2,000 articles and provides criticism, previews, interviews, and commentary on dance, film, food, literature, music, theater, television, video games, and visual arts.

As Editor-in-Chief of The Arts Fuse, a non-profit web magazine Marx launched in July 2007, Bill Marx helped increase editorial coverage of the arts and culture across Greater Boston. Bill Marx began publishing The Arts Fuse in reaction to the declining arts coverage in newspapers, magazines, radio, and television, creating a site that could experiment with professional online arts criticism, looking at new and innovative ways to use online platforms to evolve cultural conversations and bring together critics, readers, and artists.

Notable writers and critics for The Arts Fuse have included Peter-Adrian Cohen, Maryann Corbett, Franklin Einspruch, Helen Epstein, Jim Kates, Bill Marx, Gerald Peary and Vincent Czyz.

In 2011, The Arts Fuse received a grant from Mass Humanities for its Judicial Review, an online, in-depth, and interactive discussion of the issues raised by the arts on The Arts Fuse. The Arts Fuse also won CBS Boston's Most Valuable Blogger Award in 2011.
