= Entebbe raid =

1976 Israeli counter-terrorist operation

Operation Thunderbolt
- Part of the Arab–Israeli conflict and the Cold War
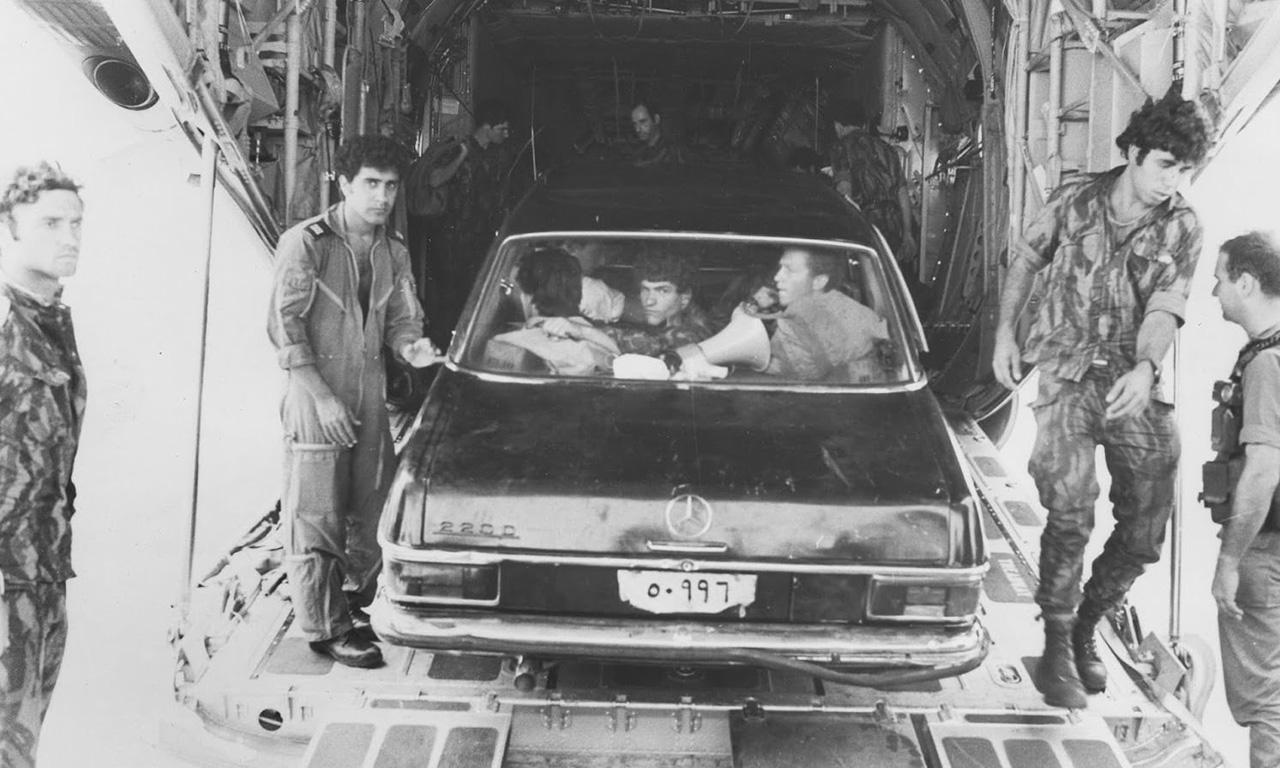
- Israeli commandos with a Mercedes-Benz 600 resembling the one owned by Ugandan dictator Idi Amin, used by Sayeret Matkal to deceive Ugandan troops during the raid
Date	3–4 July 1976
Location	Entebbe International Airport, Uganda 0°02′43″N 32°27′13″E
Result	Israeli victory: 102 of 106 hostages rescued; ~25% of Uganda's military aircraft destroyed

Belligerents
Israel	PFLP–EO; Revolutionary Cells; Uganda

Commanders and leaders
Dan Shomron; Yekutiel Adam; Benny Peled; (Israel) Yonatan Netanyahu †	Wadie Haddad; Wilfried Böse †; Idi Amin

Strength
c. 100 Israeli commandos (plus aerial crew and support personnel)	7 hijackers: 5 Palestinians, 2 Germans; 100+ Ugandan soldiers

Casualties and losses
1 killed (Yonatan Netanyahu); 5 wounded	7 hijackers killed 45 soldiers killed 11–30 Ugandan aircraft destroyed
- 4 hostages killed (incl. Dora Bloch); 10 hostages wounded

The Entebbe raid, also known as Operation Entebbe and officially codenamed Operation Thunderbolt (subsequently Operation Yonatan), was a 3 July 1976 Israeli counter-terrorist mission in Uganda. It was launched in response to the hijacking of an Air France flight from Tel Aviv to Paris by members of the PFLP-EO and the German Revolutionary Cells, who diverted the aircraft to Entebbe International Airport with the backing of Ugandan dictator Idi Amin.

Following the 27 June hijacking, the captors took the 248 passengers hostage with the objective of compelling the release of imprisoned Palestinian militants and international prisoners. Backed by over 100 Ugandan soldiers and welcomed by President Amin at Entebbe, the hijackers moved the hostages to a disused terminal. After releasing most non-Israeli hostages over the following days, the terrorists held the remaining 106 captives, predominantly Israelis and the flight crew, in a separate room.

After initial debate over whether to negotiate, the Israeli government decided on a military rescue based on intelligence provided by Mossad, preparing for potential armed confrontation with the Ugandan army.

Initiating the operation at nightfall on 3 July 1976, Israeli transport planes flew 100 commandos over 4,000 kilometres (2,500 mi) to Uganda. During the assault, the commandos rescued 102 hostages and killed all the hijackers alongside 45 Ugandan soldiers, while destroying 11 Ugandan fighter jets. Three hostages died during the raid, and a fourth—Dora Bloch, who had been taken to a Kampala hospital prior to the rescue—was subsequently murdered by Ugandan authorities. Sayeret Matkal unit commander Yonatan Netanyahu was the sole Israeli military fatality, alongside five wounded commandos.

Israel received logistical support from neighboring Kenya during the operation. In retaliation, President Amin ordered the Ugandan army to target Kenyans, leading to the killings of hundreds of Kenyan-Ugandans and the exodus of thousands more from the country.

The raid became a landmark event of the era, generating widespread international media coverage, literature, and cinematic adaptations. It significantly influenced global counter-terrorism strategy and heightened Western resolve against state-backed hostage crises.

== Hijacking ==
Air France Flight 139
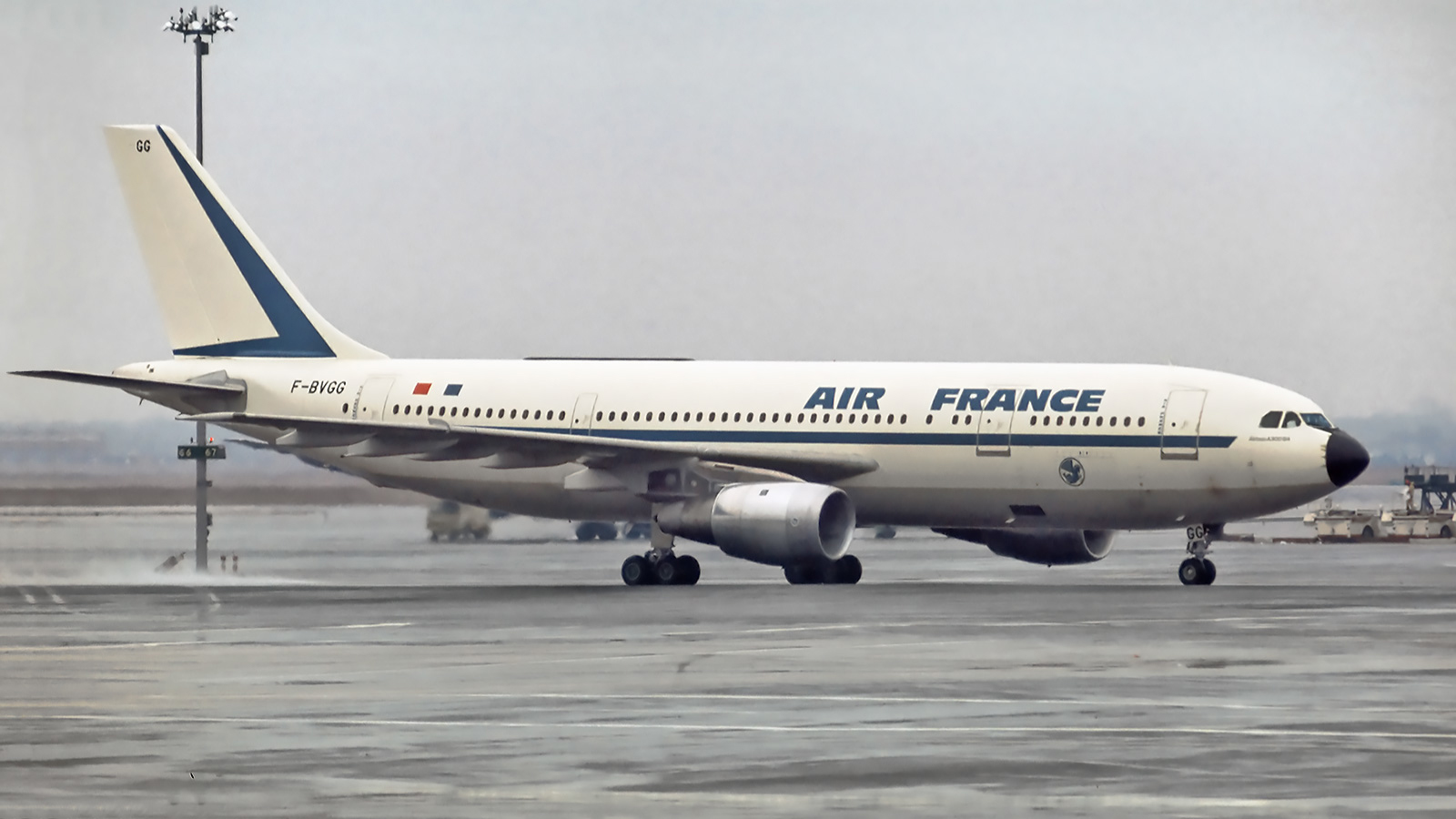
- F-BVGG, the Air France Airbus A300 involved, in February 1976

Hijacking
- Date: 27 June 1976
- Summary: Hijacking
- Site: Greek airspace

Aircraft
- Aircraft type: Airbus A300B4-203
- Operator: Air France
- Registration: F-BVGG
- Flight origin: Ben Gurion Int'l Airport, Israel
- Stopover: Athens (Ellinikon) Int'l Airport, Greece
- Destination: Charles De Gaulle Int'l Airport, France
- Occupants: 260
- Passengers: 248
- Crew: 12
- Fatalities: 4
- Injuries: 10
- Survivors: 256

On 27 June 1976, Air France Flight 139, an Airbus A300B4-203 registered as F-BVGG with serial number 019, departed from Tel Aviv, Israel, carrying 246 mainly Jewish and Israeli passengers and a crew of 12. The plane flew to Athens, Greece, where it picked up an additional 58 passengers, including four hijackers. (Note: Sources state varying numbers of passengers, between 228 and 246; the higher figure is taken from The New York Times.) It departed for Paris at 12:30 pm. Just after takeoff, the flight was hijacked by two Palestinians from the Popular Front for the Liberation of Palestine – External Operations (PFLP-EO), Jayel al-Arja and Fayez Abdul-Rahim al Jaber, and two Germans, Wilfried Böse and Brigitte Kuhlmann, from the German Revolutionary Cells. The hijackers diverted the flight to Benghazi, Libya. There it was held on the ground for seven hours for refuelling. During that time the hijackers released British-born Israeli citizen Patricia Martell, who pretended to have a miscarriage. The plane left Benghazi and at 3:15 pm on the 28 June, more than 24 hours after the flight's original departure, it arrived at Entebbe International Airport in Uganda.

=== Situation at Uganda's Entebbe International Airport ===
At Entebbe, the four hijackers were joined by at least four others, supported by the forces of Uganda's president, Idi Amin. The hijackers transferred the passengers to the transit hall of the disused former airport terminal where they kept them under guard for the following days. Amin came to visit the hostages almost on a daily basis, updating them on developments and promising to use his efforts to have them freed through negotiations.

On 28 June, a PFLP-EO hijacker issued a declaration and formulated their demands. In addition to a ransom of US$5 million for the release of the airplane, they demanded the release of 53 Palestinian and pro-Palestinian militants, 40 of whom were prisoners in Israel. They threatened that if these demands were not met, they would begin to kill hostages on 1 July 1976.

=== Separation of hostages ===
On 29 June, after Ugandan soldiers had opened an entrance to a room next to the crowded waiting hall by destroying a separating wall, the hijackers separated the Israelis (including those holding dual citizenship) from the other hostages (Note: Claims by various authors that the separation was made between Jews and non-Jews are in conflict with eyewitness accounts and later they were expressly disclaimed by several former hostages as a "myth" or a manipulation by "sensation-hungry journalists and film-makers.") and told them to move to the adjoining room. As they did so, a Holocaust survivor showed hijacker Wilfried Böse a camp registration number tattooed on his arm. Böse protested "I'm no Nazi! ... I am an idealist." In addition, five non-Israeli hostages – two ultra-orthodox Jewish couples from the US and Belgium and a French resident of Israel – were forced to join the Israeli group. According to Monique Epstein Khalepski, the French hostage among the five, the captors had singled them out for questioning and suspected them of hiding their Israeli identities. On the other hand, according to French hostage Michel Cojot-Goldberg, the captors failed to identify at least one Israeli among the passengers who was a military officer with dual citizenship then using his non-Israeli passport and he was later freed as part of the second release of non-Israeli hostages. US citizen Janet Almog, Frenchwoman Jocelyne Monier (whose husband or boyfriend was Israeli), and French-Israeli dual citizen Jean-Jacques Mimouni, whose name had not been called up during the reading of the original passport-based list, reportedly joined the Israeli hostage group by their own choice.

=== Release of most non-Israeli hostages ===
On 30 June, the hijackers released 48 hostages. The released were picked from among the non-Israeli group – mainly elderly and sick passengers and mothers with children. Forty-seven of them were flown by a chartered Air France Boeing 747 out of Entebbe to Paris, and one passenger was treated in hospital for a day. On 1 July, after the Israeli government had conveyed its agreement to negotiations, the hostage-takers extended their deadline to noon on 4 July and released another group of 100 non-Israeli captives who again were flown to Paris a few hours later. Among the 106 hostages staying behind with their captors at Entebbe airport were the 12 members of the Air France crew who refused to leave, about ten young French passengers, and the Israeli group of some 84 people.

== Israeli response ==
=== Diplomatic efforts ===
In the week before the raid, Israel tried using political avenues to obtain the release of the hostages. Many sources indicate that the Israeli cabinet was prepared to release Palestinian prisoners if a military solution seemed unlikely to succeed. A retired IDF officer, Baruch "Burka" Bar-Lev, had known Idi Amin for many years and was considered to have a strong personal relationship with him. At the request of the cabinet, he spoke with Amin on the phone many times, trying to gain the release of the hostages, without success. The Israeli government also approached the United States government to deliver a message to Egyptian president Anwar Sadat, asking him to request that Amin release the hostages. Prime minister Yitzhak Rabin and defence minister Shimon Peres spent one week disagreeing on whether to give in to the hijackers' demands (Rabin's position) or not, to prevent more terrorism (Peres' position).

At the 1st July deadline, the Israeli cabinet offered to negotiate with the hijackers to extend the deadline to 4th July. Amin also asked them to extend the deadline until that date. This meant he could take a diplomatic trip to Port Louis, Mauritius, to officially hand over chairmanship of the Organisation of African Unity to Seewoosagur Ramgoolam. This extension of the hostage deadline proved crucial to providing Israeli forces enough time to get to Entebbe.

On 3 July at 18:30, the Israeli cabinet approved a rescue mission presented by Major General Yekutiel Adam and Brigadier General Dan Shomron. Shomron was appointed as the operation commander.

=== Egyptian–PLO involvement and failure of diplomacy ===
As the crisis unfolded, attempts were made to negotiate the release of the hostages. According to declassified diplomatic documents, the Egyptian government under Sadat tried to negotiate with both the PLO and the Ugandan government. PLO chairman Yasser Arafat sent his political aide Hani al-Hassan to Uganda as a special envoy to negotiate with the hostage takers and with Amin. However, the PFLP-EO hijackers refused to see him.

=== Israel's military preparations ===
When Israeli authorities failed to negotiate a political solution, they decided that their only option was an attack to rescue the hostages. Lt. Col. Joshua Shani, lead pilot of the operation, later said that the Israelis had initially conceived of a rescue plan that involved dropping naval commandos into Lake Victoria. The commandos would have ridden rubber boats to the airport on the edge of the lake. They planned to kill the hijackers and after freeing the hostages, they would ask Amin for passage home. The Israelis abandoned this plan because they lacked the necessary time and also because they had received word that Lake Victoria was inhabited by the Nile crocodile.

Amnon Biran, the mission's intelligence officer, later stated that the proper layout of the airport was unknown, as was the exact location of the hostages and whether the building had been prepared with explosives.

==== Aircraft refuelling ====
While planning the raid, the Israeli forces had to plan how to refuel the Lockheed C-130 Hercules aircraft they intended to use while en route to Entebbe. The Israelis lacked the logistical capacity to aerially refuel four to six aircraft so far from Israeli airspace. While several East African nations, including the logistically preferred choice Kenya, were sympathetic, none wished to incur the wrath of Amin or the Palestinians by allowing the Israelis to land their aircraft within their borders.

The raid could not proceed without assistance from at least one East African government. The Israeli government secured permission from Kenya for the IDF task force to cross Kenyan airspace and refuel at what is today Jomo Kenyatta International Airport. Kenyan Minister of Agriculture Bruce MacKenzie persuaded Kenyan President Jomo Kenyatta to permit Mossad to collect intelligence prior to the operation, and to allow the Israeli Air Force access to the Nairobi airport. MacKenzie's support for the operation came after Sir Maurice Oldfield, the then head of Britain's MI6 intelligence agency, put his contacts in Mossad in touch with MacKenzie, who had been an MI6 contact for some time. The Jewish owner of the Block hotels chain in Kenya, along with other members of the Jewish and Israeli community in Nairobi, may also have used their political and economic influence to help persuade Kenya's President Jomo Kenyatta to help Israel.

Uganda's ambassador to Lesotho, Isaac Lumago overheard some of the details of the operation from Kenya Air Force officers who were discussing the possibility of Israeli compensation for the assistance and forwarded the information to Ugandan commander Isaac Maliyamungu. Maliyamungu did not alert Amin or take any action on the intelligence allegedly dismissing the report as "gasiya" (rubbish). According to Amin's son, Jaffar Remo, the Ugandan president still managed to receive Lumago's warning via telephone and, after completing his responsibilities at the OAU meeting, boarded a plane and flew back to Uganda. An ex-agent of Uganda's intelligence service, the State Research Bureau, also claimed that Amin was informed by Lumago of the imminent raid. The agent stated that Amin was terrified of possible reprisals in case his troops actually fought the Israeli military, allegedly resulting in his ordering that the Uganda Army should not open fire on Israeli aircraft during a possible raid.

==== Mossad intelligence ====
Mossad built an accurate picture of the whereabouts of the hostages, the number of hijackers, and the involvement of Ugandan troops, based on information from the released hostages in Paris. Further, Israeli firms had been involved in construction projects in Africa during the 1960s and 1970s: while preparing the raid, the Israeli army consulted with Solel Boneh, a large Israeli construction firm that had built the terminal where the hostages were held. While planning the military operation, the IDF erected a partial replica of the airport terminal with the assistance of civilians who had helped build the original.

IDF major Muki Betser later remarked in an interview that Mossad operatives extensively interviewed the hostages who had been released. He said that a French-Jewish passenger who had a military background and "a phenomenal memory" had provided detailed information about the number of weapons carried by the hostage-takers.

==== Task force ====
The Israeli ground task force numbered approximately 100 personnel, and comprised the following elements:

===== Ground command and control =====
This small group comprised the operation and overall ground commander, Brigadier General Dan Shomron, the air force representative Colonel Ami Ayalon, and the communications and support personnel.

===== Assault =====
A 29-person assault unit led by Lt. Col. Yonatan Netanyahu – this force was composed entirely of commandos from Sayeret Matkal, and was given the primary task of assaulting the old terminal and rescuing the hostages. Major Betser led one of the element's assault teams, and took command after Lt. Col. Netanyahu was killed.

===== Securers =====
1. The Paratroopers force led by Col. Matan Vilnai – tasked with securing the civilian airport field, clearing and securing the runways, and protection and fuelling of the Israeli aircraft in Entebbe.
2. The Golani force led by Col. Uri Sagi – tasked with securing the C-130 Hercules aircraft for the hostages' evacuation, getting it as close as possible to the terminal and boarding the hostages; also with acting as general reserves.
3. The Sayeret Matkal force led by Major Shaul Mofaz – tasked with clearing the military airstrip, and destroying the squadron of MiG fighter jets on the ground, to prevent any possible interceptions by the Uganda Army Air Force; also with holding off hostile ground forces from the city of Entebbe.

== Raid ==
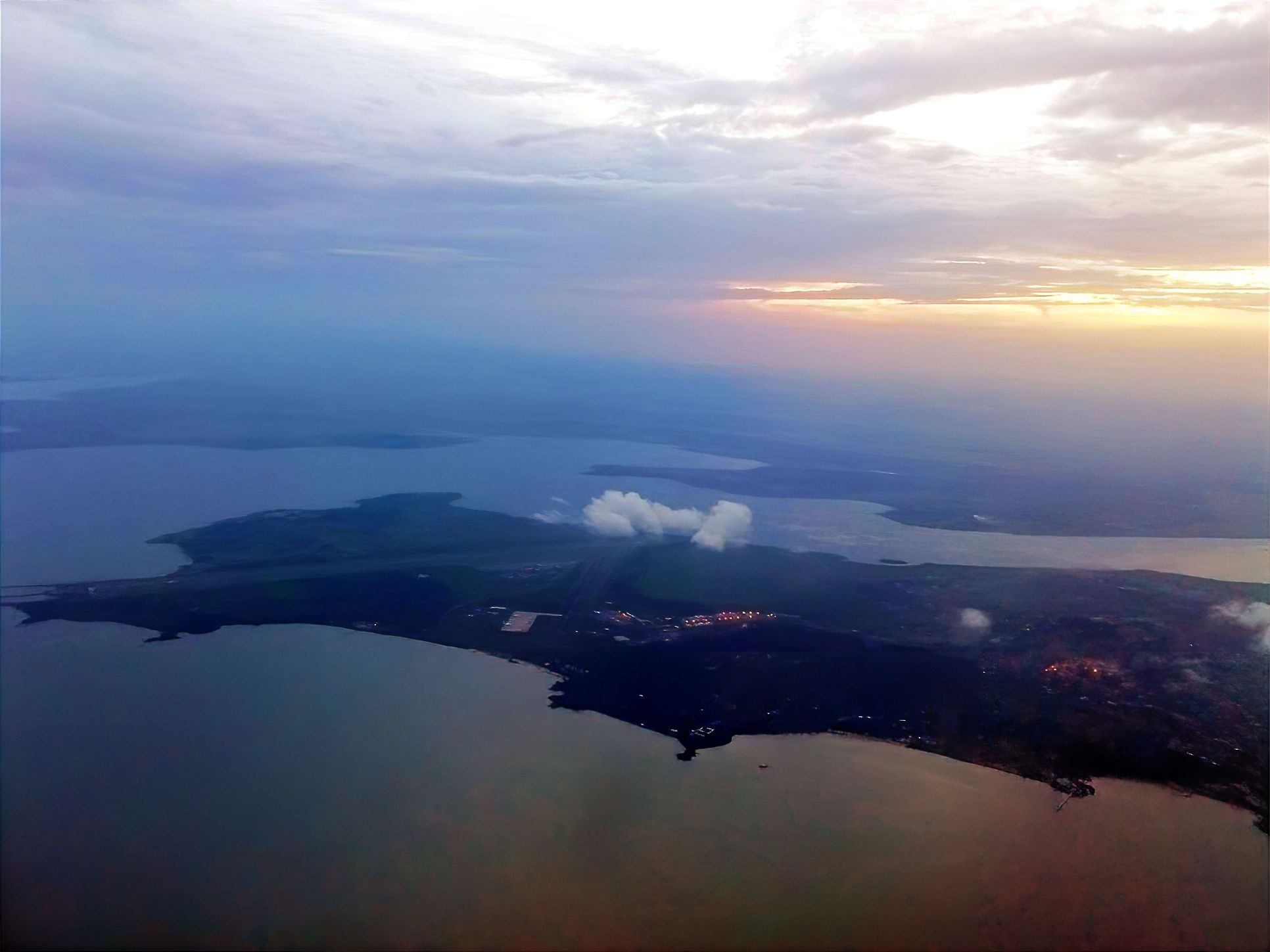
Aerial photo of the city of Entebbe and the Entebbe International Airport at sunset

=== Attack route ===
Taking off from Sharm el-Sheikh, the task force flew along the international flight path over the Red Sea mostly flying at a height of no more than 30 m (100 ft) to avoid radar detection by Egyptian, Sudanese, and Saudi Arabian forces. Near the south outlet of the Red Sea the C-130s turned south and crossed into Ethiopian territory, passing west of Djibouti. From there, they went to a point northeast of Nairobi, Kenya. They turned west, passing through the African Rift Valley and over Lake Victoria.

Two Boeing 707 jets followed the cargo planes. The first Boeing contained medical facilities and landed at Jomo Kenyatta International Airport in Nairobi, Kenya. The commander of the operation, General Yekutiel Adam, was on board the second Boeing, which circled over Entebbe Airport during the raid.

The Israeli forces landed at Entebbe on 3 July at 23:00 IST, with their cargo bay doors already open. Because the proper layout of the airport was not known, the first plane almost taxied into a ditch. A black Mercedes car that looked like President Idi Amin's vehicle and Land Rovers that usually accompanied Amin's Mercedes were brought along. The Israelis hoped they could use them to bypass security checkpoints. When the C-130s landed, Israeli assault team members drove the vehicles to the terminal building in the same fashion as Amin. As they approached the terminal, two Ugandan sentries, aware that Idi Amin had recently purchased a white Mercedes, ordered the vehicles to stop. The first commandos shot the sentries using silenced pistols. This was against the plan and against the orders – the Ugandans were to be ignored, as they were believed not to be likely to open fire at this stage. An Israeli commando in one of the following Land Rovers opened fire with an unsuppressed rifle. Fearing the hijackers would be alerted prematurely, the assault team quickly approached the terminal.

=== Hostage rescue ===
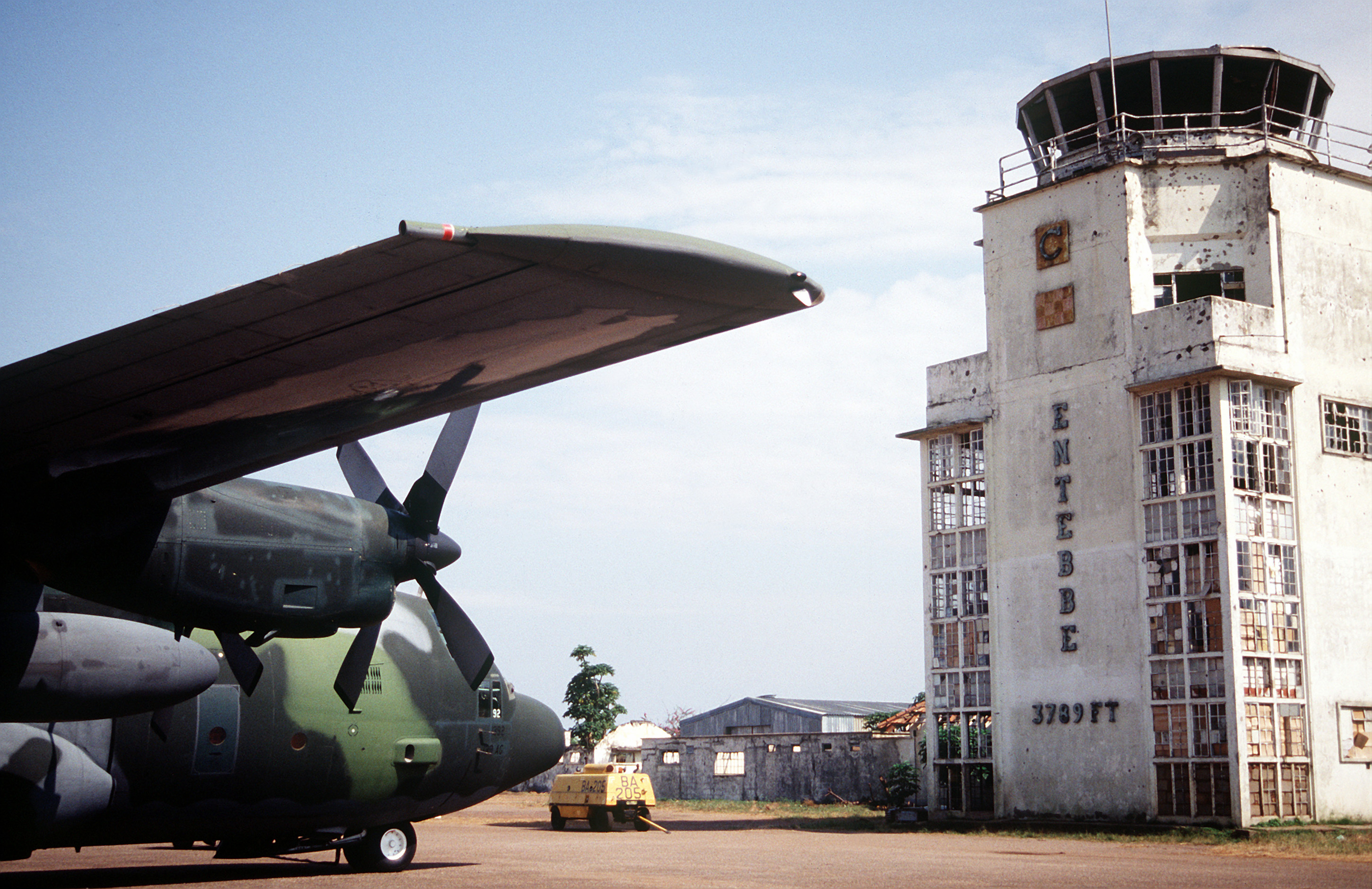
A 1994 photograph of the old terminal with a U.S. Air Force C-130 Hercules parked in front. Bullet holes from the 1976 raid are still visible.

The Israelis left their vehicles and ran towards the terminal. The hostages were in the main hall of the airport building, directly adjacent to the runway. Entering the terminal, the commandos shouted through a megaphone, "Stay down! Stay down! We are Israeli soldiers," in both Hebrew and English. Jean-Jacques Maimoni, a 19-year-old French immigrant to Israel, stood up and was killed when Muki Betser and another soldier mistook him for a hijacker and fired at him. Another hostage, Pasco Cohen, 52, was also fatally wounded by gunfire from the commandos. In addition, a third hostage, 56-year-old Ida Borochovitch, a Russian Jew who had emigrated to Israel, was killed by a hijacker in the crossfire.

According to hostage Ilan Hartuv, Wilfried Böse was the only hijacker who, after the operation began, entered the hall housing the hostages. At first he pointed his Kalashnikov rifle at hostages, but "immediately came to his senses" and ordered them to find shelter in the restroom, before being killed by the commandos. According to Hartuv, Böse fired only at Israeli soldiers and not at hostages.

At one point an Israeli commando called out in Hebrew, "Where are the rest of them?" referring to the hijackers. The hostages pointed to a connecting door of the airport's main hall, into which the commandos threw several hand grenades. They then entered the room and shot dead the three remaining hijackers, ending the assault. Meanwhile, the other three C-130 Hercules aeroplanes had landed and unloaded armoured personnel carriers to provide defence during the anticipated hour of refuelling. The Israelis then destroyed Ugandan MiG fighter planes to prevent them from pursuing, and conducted a sweep of the airfield to gather intelligence.

=== Departure ===
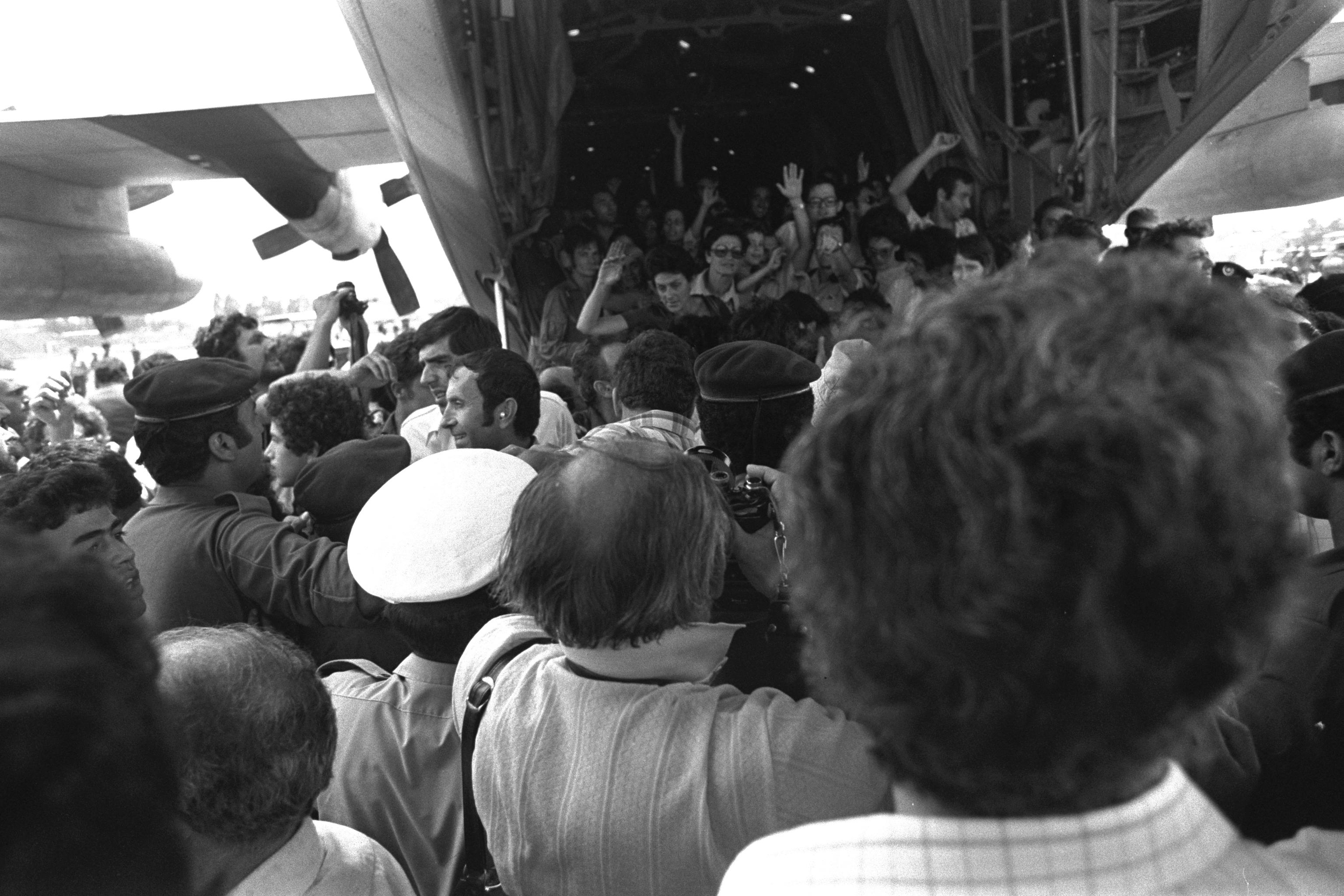
Rescued passengers welcomed at Ben Gurion Airport

After the raid, the Israeli assault team returned to their aircraft and began loading the hostages. Ugandan soldiers shot at them in the process. The Israeli commandos returned fire, inflicting casualties on the Ugandans. During this brief but intense firefight, Ugandan soldiers fired from the airport control tower. At least five commandos were wounded, and the Israeli unit commander, Yonatan Netanyahu, was killed. Israeli commandos fired light machine guns and a rocket-propelled grenade back at the control tower, suppressing the Ugandans' fire. According to one of Idi Amin's sons, the soldier who shot Netanyahu, a cousin of the Amin family, was killed by return fire. The Israelis finished evacuating the hostages, loaded Netanyahu's body into one of the planes, and left the airport. The entire operation lasted 53 minutes – of which the assault lasted only 30 minutes. All seven hijackers present, and 45 Ugandan soldiers, were killed. (Note: Based on a Reuters report, historian Derek R. Peterson claimed that the Uganda Army Air Force commander was among those killed during the operation. As Godwin Sule was the acting air force commander in 1976, and survived the raid, it is unclear who the Reuters report referred to.) Eleven Soviet-built MiG-17 and MiG-21 fighter planes of the Uganda Army Air Force were destroyed on the ground at Entebbe Airport. Out of the 106 hostages, 3 were killed, 1 was left in Uganda (74-year-old Dora Bloch), and approximately 10 were wounded. The 102 rescued hostages were flown to Israel via Nairobi, Kenya, shortly after the raid.

=== Ugandan reaction ===
Amin was furious upon learning of the raid, and reportedly boasted that he could have taught the Israelis a lesson if he had known that they would strike. Following the raid, Maliyamungu had 14 soldiers arrested under suspicion of collaborating with the Israelis. Once they were gathered in a room at Makindye Barracks, he shot 12 of them with his pistol. Uganda Army Chief of Staff Mustafa Adrisi reportedly wanted to incarcerate or execute Godwin Sule, the Entebbe Air Base commander, who was absent from his post during the raid. Sule had left the air base early that day to meet a female companion at Lake Victoria Hotel on 4 July. Despite Adrisi's demands, Sule's closeness to President Amin guaranteed his safety.

The raid also sparked anger among sections of the Ugandan population. According to Amin's advisor Bob Astles, Uganda Army soldiers were so angry that they "accused [Amin] of allowing the Israelis (IDF) into the country" and even threatened him. The president responded by deflecting blame, claiming that the IDF had been assisted by Ugandan civilian collaborators. On 5 July, a Ugandan man named Abubakar Kibudde wrote a letter to the president, proposing that he and his veteran organization would join a volunteer army under Amin to oppose Israel and the Apartheid states of southern Africa.

==== Murder of Dora Bloch ====
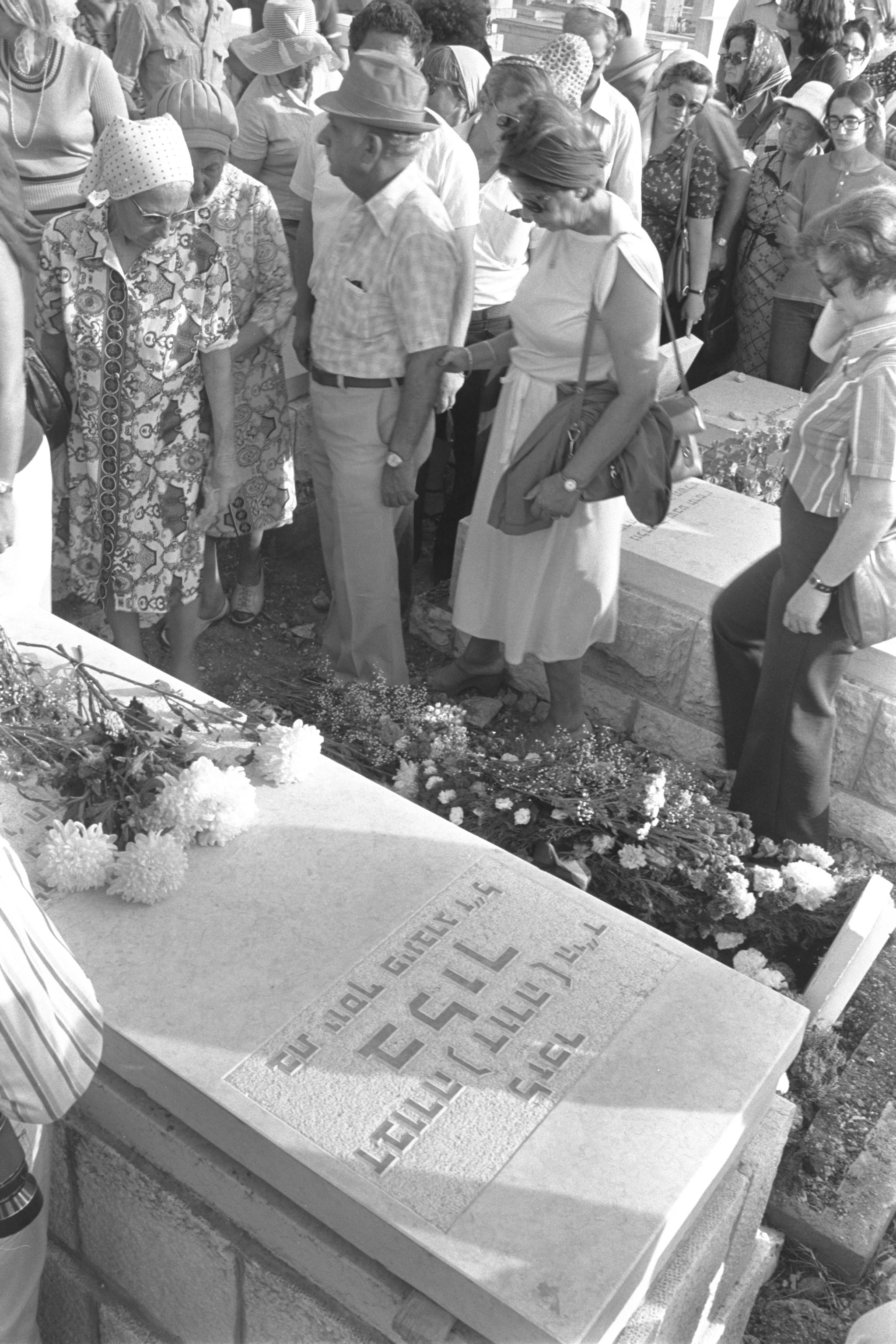
Mourners pay their last respects to Dora Bloch.

Dora Bloch, a 73-year-old Israeli who also held British citizenship, was taken to Mulago Hospital in Kampala after choking on a chicken bone. After the raid she was murdered by officers of the Uganda Army, as were some of her doctors and nurses, apparently for trying to intervene. (Note: Now confidential cabinet papers released under the Freedom of Information Act show that the British High Commission in Kampala received a report from a Ugandan civilian that Mrs Bloch had been shot and her body dumped in the boot of a car which had Ugandan intelligence services number plates.) In April 1987, Henry Kyemba, Uganda's Attorney general and Minister of Justice at the time, told the Uganda Human Rights Commission that Bloch had been dragged from her hospital bed and killed by two army officers on Amin's orders. Bloch was shot and her body was dumped in the trunk of a car that had Ugandan intelligence services number plates. Her remains were recovered near a sugar plantation 20 miles (32 km) east of Kampala in 1979, after the Uganda–Tanzania War ended Amin's rule.

==== Idi Amin's anti-Kenyan crackdown ====
Amin also ordered the killing of hundreds of Kenyans living in Uganda in retaliation for Kenya's assistance to Israel in the raid. Uganda killed 245 Kenyans, including airport staff at Entebbe. To avoid massacre, approximately 3,000 Kenyans fled Uganda as refugees.

On 24 May 1978, Kenya's former agriculture minister, Bruce MacKenzie, was killed when a bomb attached to his aircraft exploded as MacKenzie departed a meeting with Amin. Some have asserted that Amin ordered Ugandan agents to assassinate MacKenzie in retaliation for Kenya's involvement and MacKenzie's actions prior to the raid. Others have indicated various other possible causes for the bombing, including that another person aboard the plane may have been the target. Later, Mossad Chief Director Meir Amit had a forest planted in Israel in MacKenzie's name.

== Aftermath and reactions ==
=== United Nations ===
The United Nations Security Council convened on 9 July 1976, to consider a complaint from the Chairman of the Organization of African Unity charging Israel with an "act of aggression". The Council allowed Israel's ambassador to the United Nations, Chaim Herzog, and Uganda's foreign minister, Juma Oris Abdalla, to participate without voting rights. UN Secretary General Kurt Waldheim told the Security Council that the raid was "a serious violation of the sovereignty of a Member State of the United Nations" though he was "fully aware that this is not the only element involved ... when the world community is now required to deal with unprecedented problems arising from international terrorism." Abdalla, the representative of Uganda, alleged that the affair was close to a peaceful resolution when Israel intervened while Herzog, the representative of Israel, accused Uganda of direct complicity in the hijacking. The US and UK sponsored a resolution which condemned hijacking and similar acts, deplored the loss of life arising from the hijacking (without condemning either Israel or Uganda), reaffirmed the need to respect the sovereignty and territorial integrity of all states, and called on the international community to enhance the safety of civil aviation. However, the resolution failed to receive the required number of affirmative votes because two voting members abstained and seven were absent. A second resolution sponsored by Benin, Libya and Tanzania, that condemned Israel, was not put to a vote.

=== Western Bloc ===
Western nations spoke in support of the raid. Switzerland and France publicly praised the operation.

West Germany praised the raid and used it to advance its push for a multilateral U.N. convention against hostage-taking. Although the United States strongly backed the initiative, its support alienated many developing nations, which feared the convention could give great powers cover to infringe on weaker states' sovereignty. Despite the setback, West Germany persisted in its efforts, later leading to the 1979 International Convention against the Taking of Hostages.

In the United States, the raid’s coincidence with the American bicentennial sparked the "Entebbe Derby," a dramatic surge in media attention, books, films, and television portrayals. President Gerald Ford publicly congratulated Israel, while members of Congress introduced 12 separate resolutions praising the operation and urging an international conference on terrorism. Under Colonel Charles Beckwith's leadership, the Army began laying the groundwork for the Delta Force, though it only received full authorization after the GSG 9 antiterrorist raid on Lufthansa Flight 181 in 1977. Despite blanket public support for the raid, Henry Kissinger privately criticized Israeli use of U.S. equipment during the operation during a conversation with Israeli Ambassador Simcha Dinitz. In mid-July 1976, the supercarrier USS Ranger and her escorts entered the Indian Ocean and operated off the Kenyan coast in response to a threat of military action by forces from Uganda.

The hijacked aircraft's pilot, Captain Michel Bacos, was awarded the Legion of Honour, and the other crew members were awarded the French Order of Merit.

In the ensuing years, Betser and the Netanyahu brothers – Iddo and Benjamin, all Sayeret Matkal veterans – argued in increasingly public forums about who was to blame for the unexpected early firefight that caused Yonatan's death and partial loss of tactical surprise.

In a letter dated 13 July 1976, the Supreme Commander's Staff of the Imperial Iranian Armed Forces praised the Israeli commandos for the mission and extended condolences for "the loss and martyrdom" of Netanyahu.

F-BVGG, the aircraft in the hijacking of Air France Flight 139, was repaired and returned to service with Air France. In April 1996, the aircraft was leased to Vietnam Airlines for three months. In December the same year, the aircraft was converted into a freighter and was delivered to S–C Aviation, having been re-registered as N742SC. In 1998, the aircraft was delivered to MNG Airlines and re-registered as TC-MNA. In 2009, the aircraft was placed into storage at Istanbul Atatürk Airport and was scrapped in 2020.

=== Bombing of Kenya's Norfolk Hotel in Nairobi ===
The Norfolk Hotel in Nairobi, owned by a prominent member of the local Jewish community, was bombed on 31 December 1980. The bomb flattened the hotel, killing 20 people, of several nationalities, and injuring 87 more. It was believed to be an act of revenge by pro-Palestinian militants for Kenya's supporting role in Operation Entebbe.

== Commemorations ==
In August 2012, Uganda and Israel commemorated the raid at a somber ceremony at the base of the tower at the old terminal, where Yonatan Netanyahu was killed. Uganda and Israel renewed their commitment to "fight terrorism and to work towards humanity". In addition, wreaths were laid, a moment of silence was held, speeches were given, and a poem was recited. The flags of Uganda and Israel were flown side by side, symbolising the two countries' strong bilateral relations, next to a plaque bearing a history of the raid. The ceremony was attended by Ugandan State Minister for Animal Industry Bright Rwamirama and the deputy Foreign Affairs Minister of Israel Daniel Ayalon, who laid wreaths at the site.

In 2016, forty years to the day after the rescue operation, Israeli prime minister Benjamin Netanyahu, brother of slain Israeli commando Yonatan Netanyahu, visited Entebbe with an Israeli delegation, and laid the groundwork for further Israeli–sub-Saharan African bilateral relations. In the U.S., the commemoration of the 40th anniversary of the operation was held at Temple Mikvah Israel, in Philadelphia, PA where a memorial to Yonatan Netanayahu who was killed in the operation was built in 1982.

== In popular culture ==
=== Documentaries ===
- Operation Thunderbolt: Entebbe, a documentary about the hijacking and the subsequent rescue mission.
- Rise and Fall of Idi Amin (1980), a biographical film of the Ugandan dictator briefly features the raid, with an unusual depiction of Amin displaying cowardice when he learns of it.
- Rescue at Entebbe, Episode 12 of 2005 documentary series Against All Odds: Israel Survives by Michael Greenspan.
- Cohen on the Bridge (2010), a documentary by director Andrew Wainrib, who gained access to the surviving commandos and hostages.
- Live or Die in Entebbe (2012) by director Eyal Boers follows Yonatan Khayat's journey to uncover the circumstances of his uncle Jean-Jacques Maimoni's death in the raid.
- "Assault on Entebbe", an episode of the National Geographic Channel documentary Critical Situation.
- Operation Thunderbolt, the fifth episode in the 2012 Military Channel documentary series Black Ops.

=== Dramatizations ===
- Victory at Entebbe (1976): with Anthony Hopkins, Burt Lancaster, Elizabeth Taylor and Richard Dreyfuss, Director: Marvin J. Chomsky.
- Raid on Entebbe (1977): with Peter Finch, Horst Buchholz, Charles Bronson, John Saxon, Yaphet Kotto, and James Woods, Director: Irvin Kershner, Producer: Edgar J. Scherick.
- Operation Thunderbolt (1977): with Yehoram Gaon played Col. Netanyahu, Sybil Danning and Klaus Kinski played the hijackers. Director: Menahem Golan.
- The Last King of Scotland (2006): The raid occurs as one episode in a longer story about Idi Amin.
- Entebbe (2018): Director: José Padilha.

=== Films inspired by Operation Entebbe ===
- The Delta Force (1986) which featured a hostage rescue operation inspired by Operation Entebbe.
- Zameen (2003) is a Bollywood movie starring Ajay Devgan and Abhishek Bachchan who draw a plan to rescue hostages of an Indian airliner hijacked by Pakistani militants on the basis of Operation Entebbe.

=== Other media ===
- Operation Thunderbolt, a 1988 arcade game, loosely based on Operation Entebbe, but using a fictional location.
- To Pay the Price, a 2009 play by Peter-Adrian Cohen based in part on Yonatan Netanyahu's letters. The play, produced by North Carolina's Theatre Or opened off-off Broadway in New York in June 2009 during the Festival of Jewish Theater and Ideas.

== Gallery ==
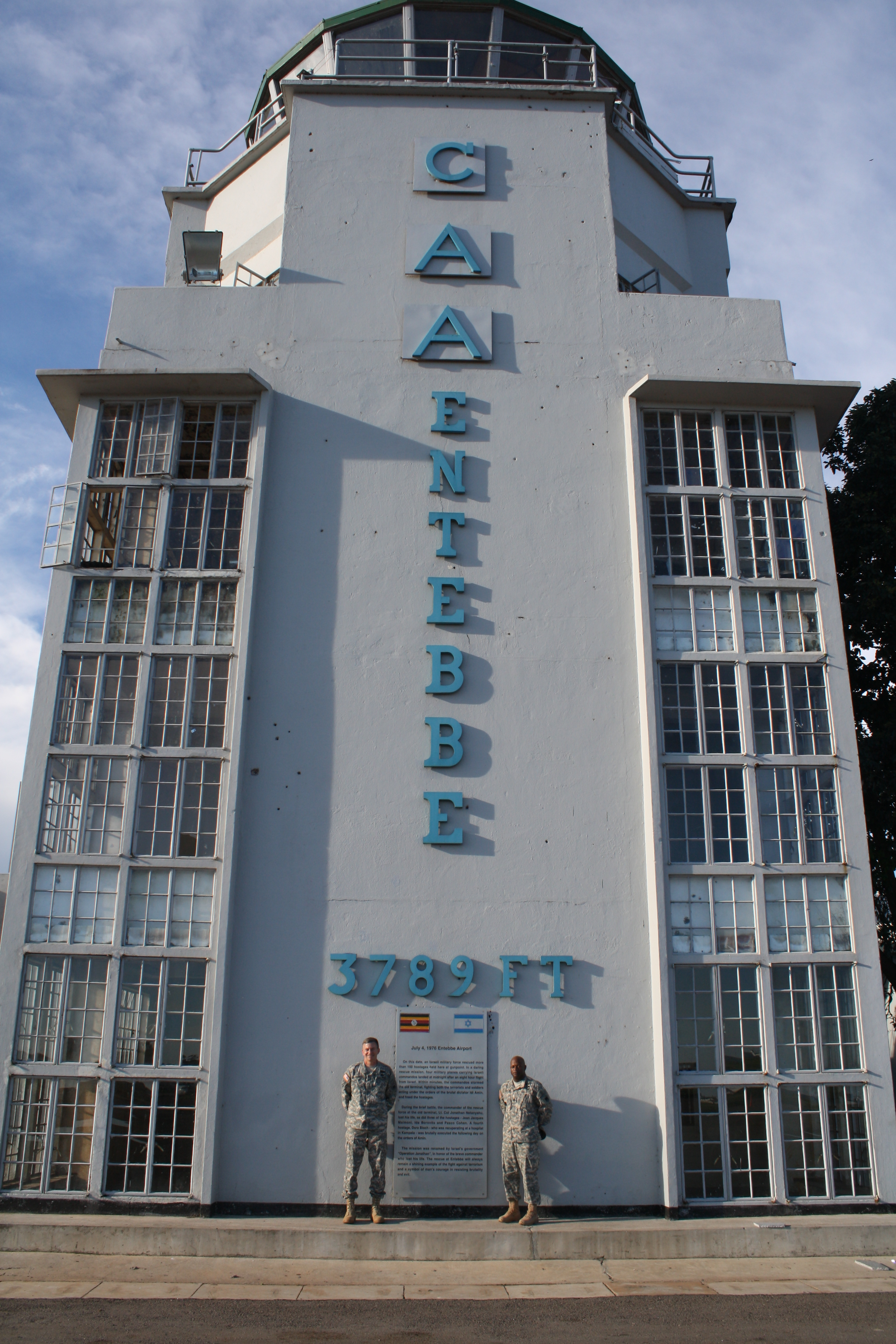
The old control tower as seen from the front

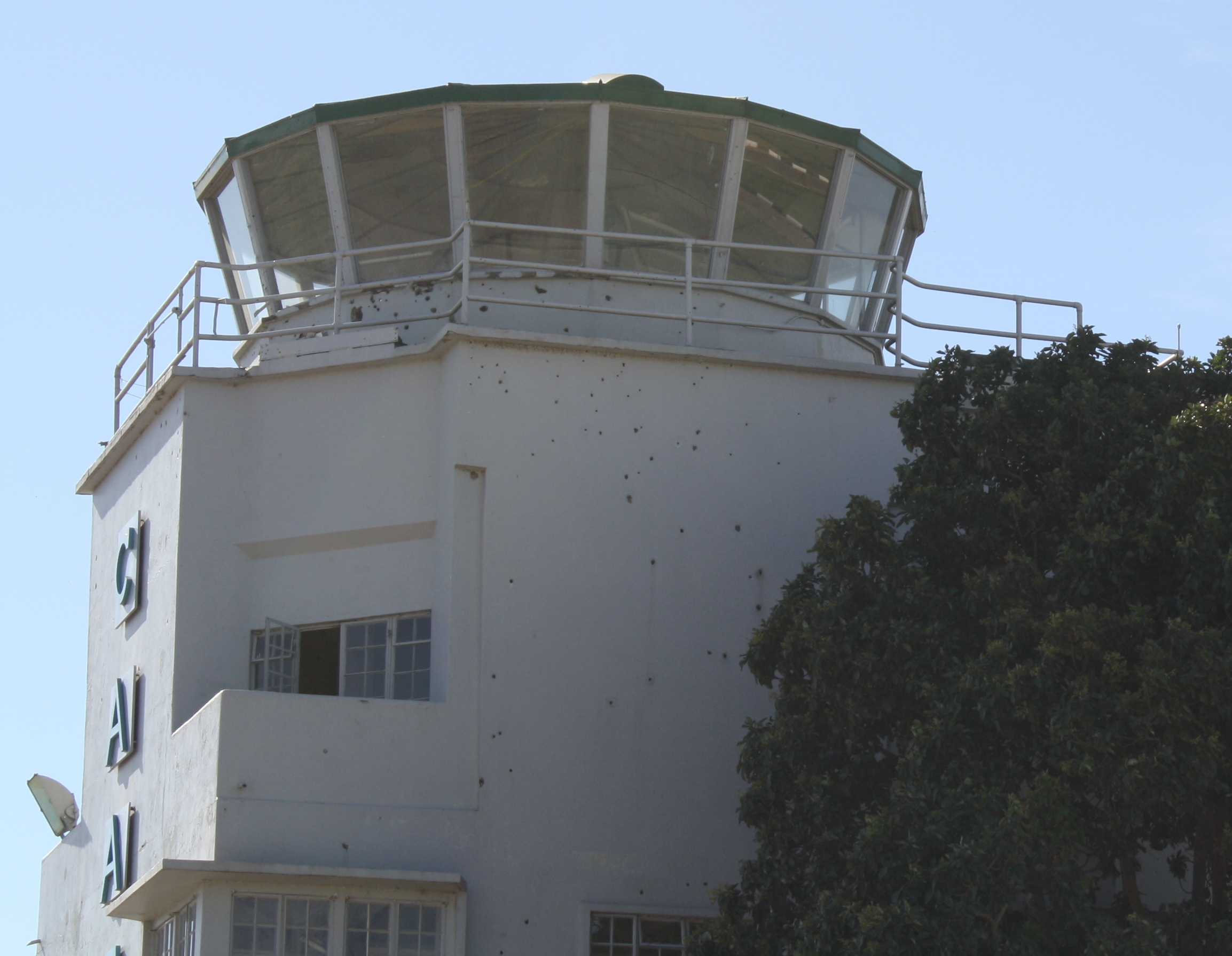
Close up of the control tower

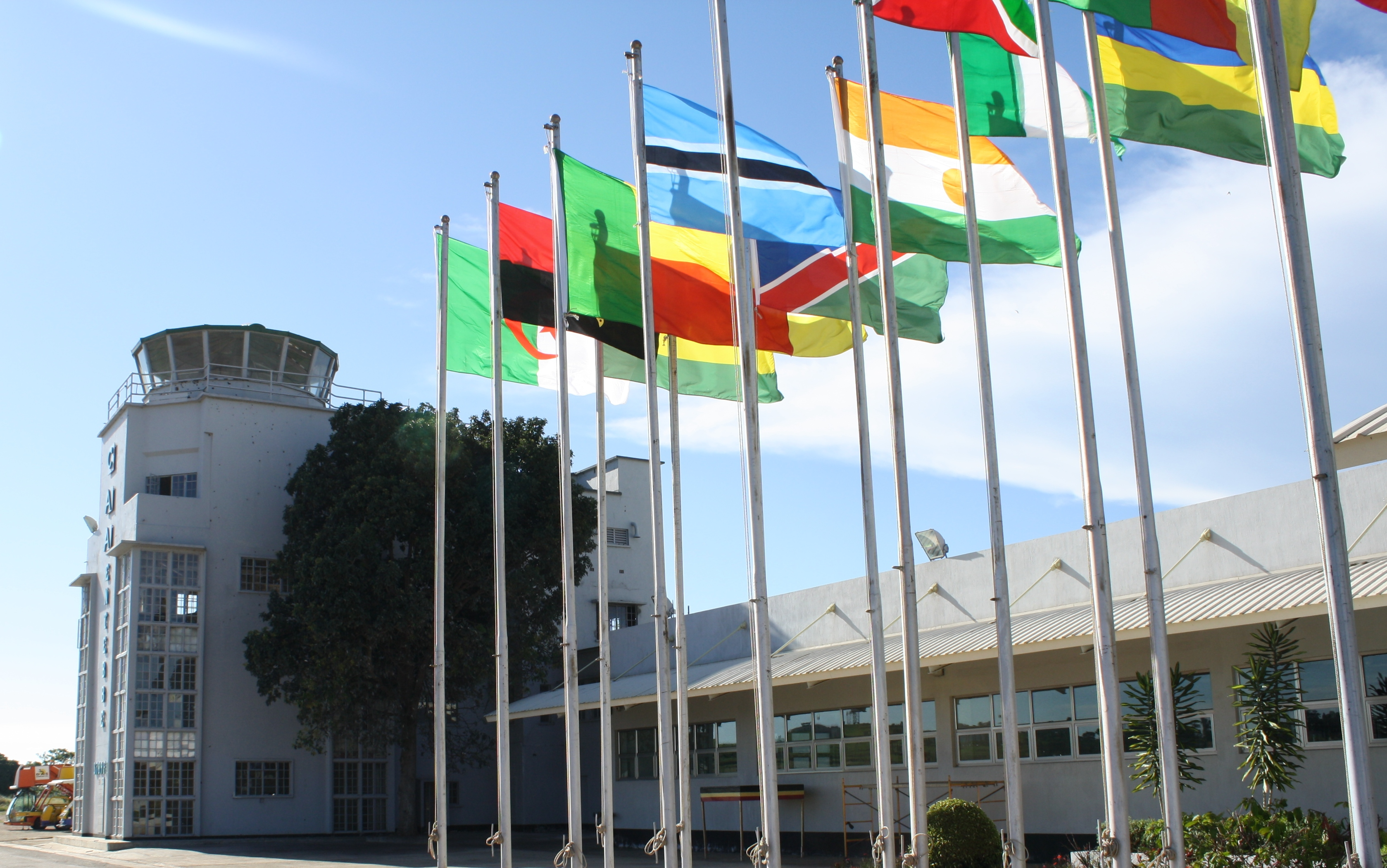
The old terminal building as it appeared in 2009

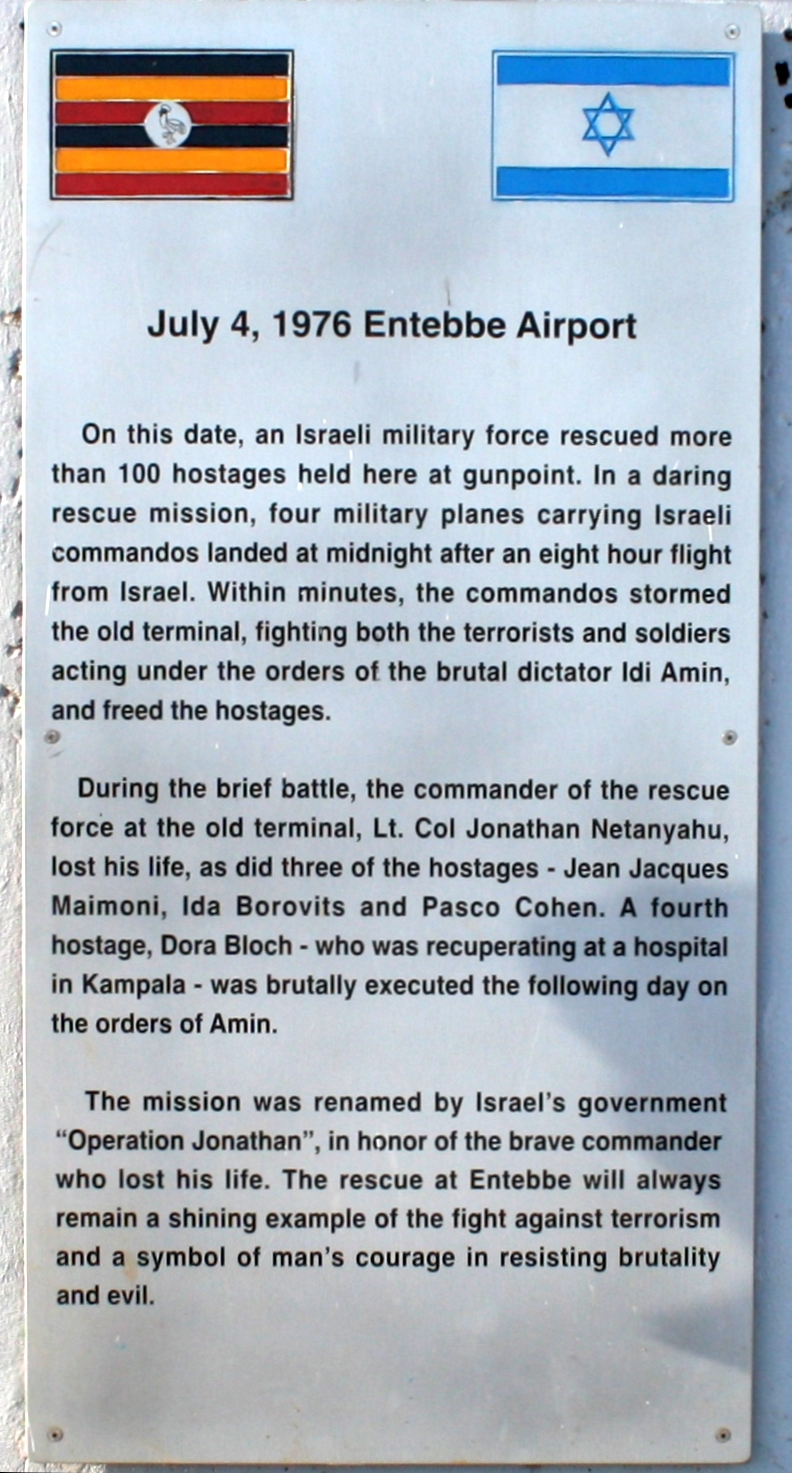
Wall plaque on display at the old terminal building

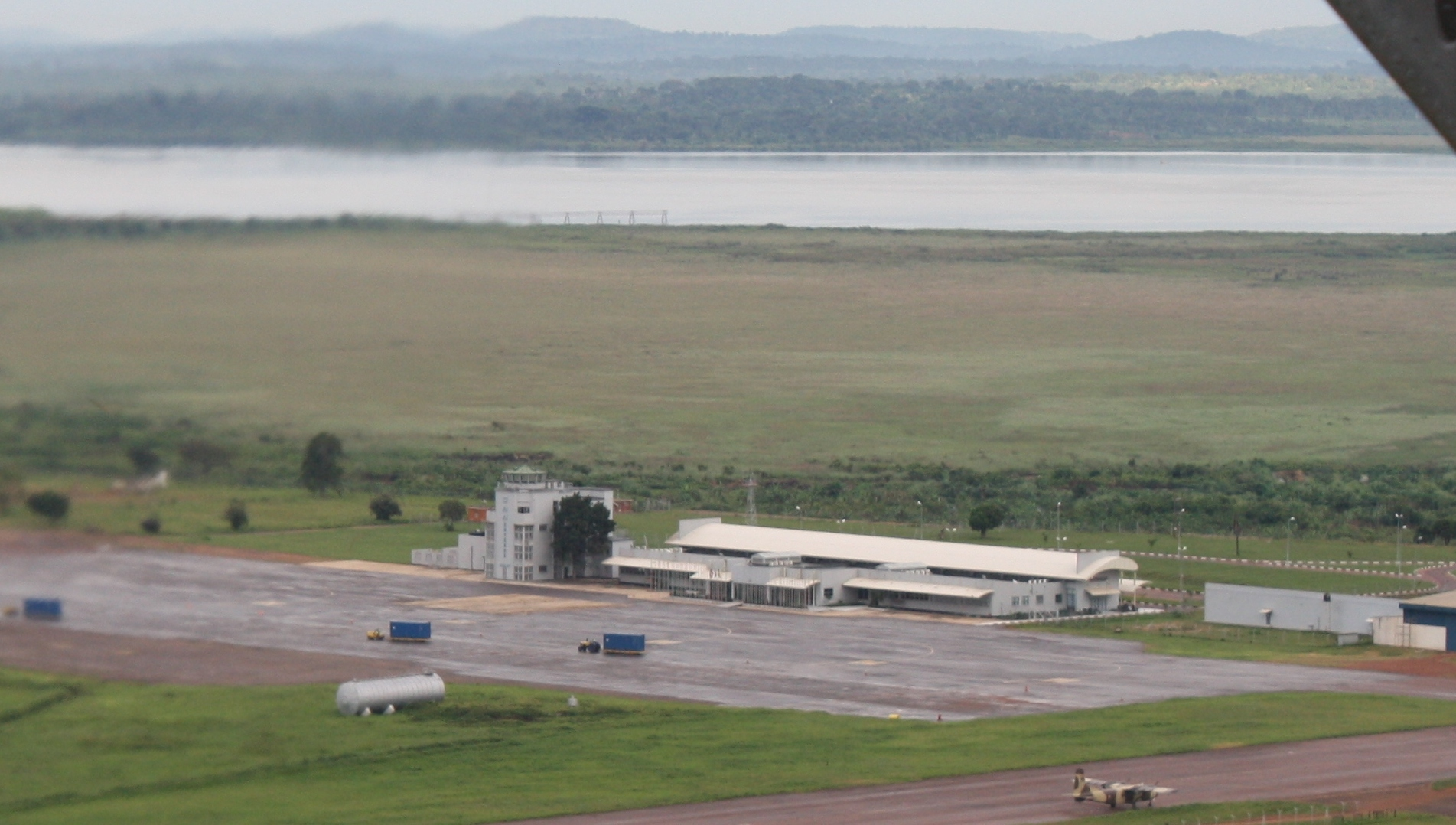
The old terminal building of the Entebbe International Airport as seen from the air

== See also ==
- Air France Flight 8969 – a similar 1994 hijacking and raid
- Lufthansa Flight 181 – 1977 hijacking influenced by Entebbe
- Operation Mikado – a proposed SAS operation during the Falklands War inspired by Entebbe
- Operation Niki – a clandestine airlift of a battalion of Greek commandos from Crete to Cyprus in 1974
- Sayeret – Israeli Special Forces Units
