= Washington Huskies baseball =

American intercollegiate baseball team

- 2026 Washington Huskies baseball team
- Founded: 1901 (124 years ago)
- University: University of Washington
- Athletic director: Patrick Chun
- Head coach: Eddie Smith (2nd season)
- Conference: Big Ten
- Location: Seattle, Washington
- Home stadium: Husky Ballpark (capacity: 2,200)
- Nickname: Huskies
- Colors: Purple and gold

College World Series appearances
- 2018*

NCAA regional champions
- 2018*

NCAA tournament appearances
- 1959, 1992, 1994, 1997, 1998, 2002, 2003, 2004, 2014, 2016, 2018*, 2023

Conference tournament champions
- 1997, 1998

Conference regular season champions
- PCC: 1919, 1922; PCC North Division: 1923, 1925, 1926, 1929, 1930, 1932, 1952, 1959; Pac-10 North: 1981, 1992, 1993, 1996, 1997, 1998 *vacated by NCAA

The Washington Huskies baseball team is the varsity intercollegiate baseball team of the University of Washington, located in Seattle, Washington, United States. The program has been a member of the NCAA Division I Big Ten Conference since the start of the 2025 season, preceded by the Pac-12 Conference and the Pacific Coast Conference.

The team has played at Husky Ballpark since 1998; the on-campus venue was renovated extensively for the start of the 2014 season. Eddie Smith has been the head coach since the 2025 season and enters his third season at the helm in 2027. The program has appeared in nine NCAA tournaments. It has won two Pac-10 North-South Division playoffs, six Pac-10 North Division Titles, eight PCC North Division Titles, and two PCC Regular season Championships. As of the start of the 2014 season, 18 former Huskies have appeared in the major leagues.

== History ==
The baseball program at UW began play in the 1901 season, in which it went 4–6 under head coach Fred Schlock. After not competing in 1902, the team returned in the 1903 season. From its inception through the end of the 1915 season, the team did not belong to a conference. Prior to 1923, most of the program's head coaches served only one or two seasons, with Dode Brinker being the only exception. Brinker served four tenures as the program's head coach (1906, 1909–1910, 1915–1916, 1918–1919), in between which he also played professional baseball. In his seven seasons as the team's head coach, Washington had a 59–28 record.

=== Pacific Coast Conference ===
Under Brinker, the program joined the Pacific Coast Conference (PCC) for the 1916 season. After not playing in 1917 due to World War I and competing as an independent in 1918, the PCC resumed baseball in 1919. Washington won that year's conference championship with a perfect 10–0 record in Brinker's final season. It won the PCC Championship again in 1922 under head coach Robert L. Mathews.

In 1922, the university adopted the husky as its mascot and athletic nickname. Since 1920, the teams' nickname had been the Sundodgers, and prior to that the university's athletic programs were known as both the Indians and the Vikings.

Prior to the 1923 season, Tubby Graves became the program's head coach; the Huskies won seven PCC North Division titles, all in Graves' first ten seasons. In 1932, the Huskies won the North Division title with a 13–4 conference record, the division title was the team's last under Graves, who coached through the end of the 1946 season. In the 1930s, the team's home venue was named Graves Field in honor of Graves, and the name carried over to the next venue used by Washington from the late-1960s until the end of the 1997 season.

After finishing no higher than second in the PCC North Division from 1932 to 1951, the team tied for the division title in 1951. In the 1959 season, the Huskies won the North Division title outright under coach Dale Parker. In doing so, the program qualified for its first NCAA tournament. It finished second in the District VIII Regionals with a 1–2 record.

=== Pac-12 Conference ===
On July 1, 1959, the PCC dissolved following a scandal involving illegal payments to football players at several of the conference's schools. In reaction, five former PCC members, including Washington, formed the Athletic Association of Western Universities (AAWU), which began play in the 1959–1960 school year. With the addition of several other schools, the conference eventually became known as the Pac-12 Conference.

Washington struggled in its first two decades after beginning play in the AAWU in the 1960 season. It did not have a winning conference record in its first 19 seasons in the AAWU (renamed the Pacific-8 Conference following the 1968 season). The stretch included five consecutive last-place finishes from 1967 to 1971 under head coach Ken Lehman. The program had its first winning conference record in the 1979 season, when it finished in second place in the North Division of the Pacific-10 Conference, which had been renamed prior to that season.

In 1981, head coach Bob MacDonald, who had held the position since prior to the 1977 season, led the team to its first division title since 1959. MacDonald was also the head coach in 1985, when the team qualified for its first Pac-10 North Division Tournament. The Huskies qualified for the tournament in each of the next five seasons, finishing as the tournament runner-up in 1987 and 1990. In 1992, MacDonald's final season, the Huskies qualified for their second NCAA tournament with a 39–21 record and North Division title. The team was seeded sixth in the six-team West Regional. After defeating first-seeded Arizona and fourth-seeded Fresno State in its opening two games, the team lost consecutive games to Pepperdine and Hawaii and was eliminated.

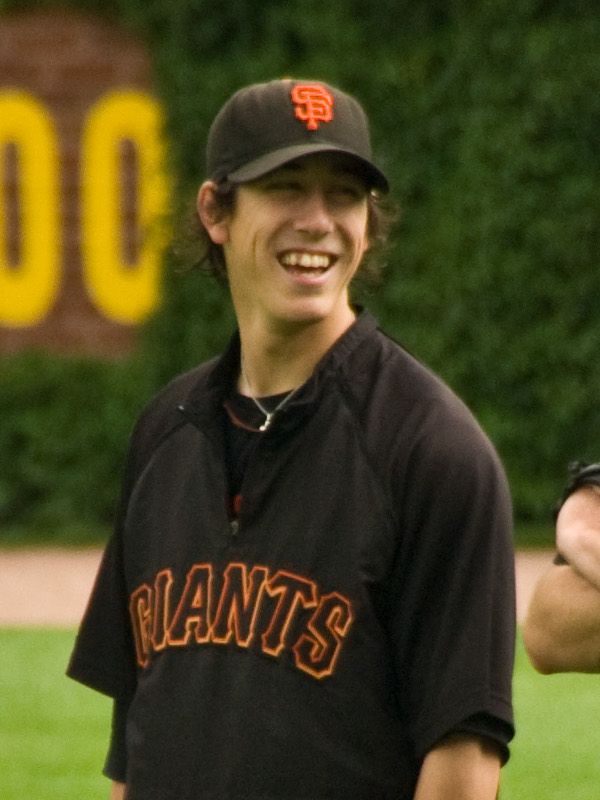
Tim Lincecum, 2008 and 2009 National League Cy Young Award Winner, shown while pitching for the San Francisco Giants.

Following the 1992 season, MacDonald left Washington to become the head coach at Navy and was succeeded by Husky assistant coach Ken Knutson. In 1993, Knutson's first season, the team won the Pac-10 North and had a 39-19 overall record but did not receive an at-large bid to the NCAA tournament. In 1994, the team did qualify for the NCAA tournament and played in the Midwest II Regional. The Huskies lost to Georgia Tech in the regional finals. The program continued to have success in the 1990s, winning the Pac-10 North Division title in 1996, 1997, and 1998. It qualified for the 1997 and 1998 NCAA tournaments after winning the Pac-10 North-South Division Playoff in each season. Individually, Chris Magruder, who later played Major League Baseball, was named a Second Team All-American by the National Collegiate Baseball Writers Association in 1998.

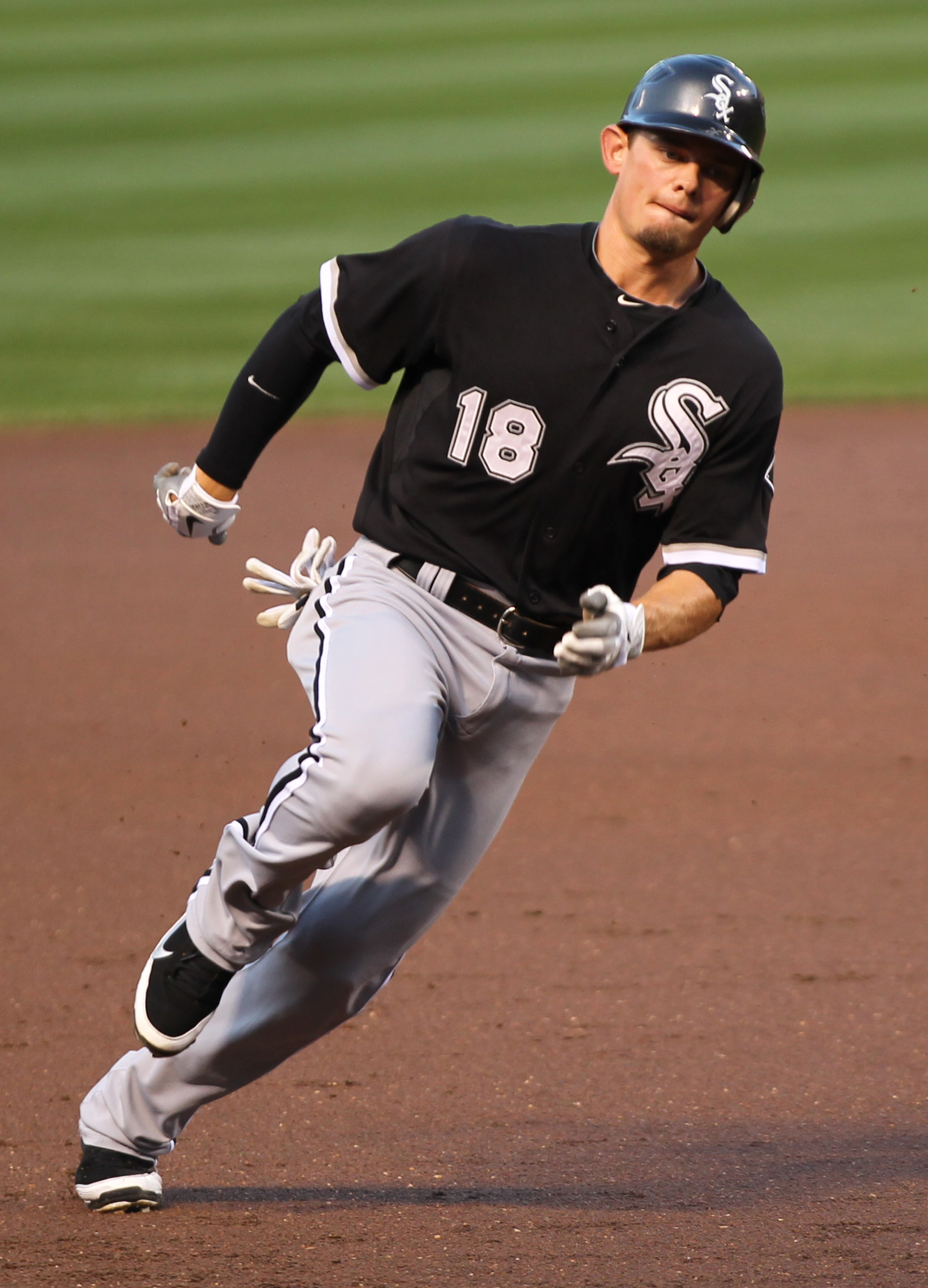
Brent Lillibridge, shown while playing for Major League Baseball's Chicago White Sox in 2011.

Prior to the 1998 season, the program opened Husky Ballpark, a newly built on-campus home venue that replaced Graves Field. In Washington's first game at the new facility, the Huskies lost to Gonzaga 4–3.

In the three seasons from 1999 to 2001, the program finished with a conference winning percentage of .500 or worse and did not qualify for the NCAA tournament. From 2002 to 2004, however, the team qualified for three consecutive NCAA tournaments. Its most successful tournament came in 2004, when the Huskies qualified as the second-seeded team in the Oxford Regional. After losing its opening game to Tulane, the team defeated Ole Miss and Western Kentucky in consecutive elimination games before being eliminated by Tulane in the Regional Finals. Future Major League Baseball players on the 2004 team included Tim Lincecum and Brent Lillibridge. Lincecum was named that season's co-National Freshman of the Year by Collegiate Baseball.

Following the 2009 season, head coach Knutson was fired after four consecutive losing seasons in the Pac-10. He was replaced by Indiana State head coach Lindsay Meggs, who played college ball at UCLA. In Meggs' first four seasons, the Huskies' highest win total was 30 (in 2012), and their highest Pac-12 finish was a tie for 6th (in 2013). In 2014, the program reached its first NCAA tournament in a decade, going 41–17 and finishing second in the Pac-12. At the Oxford Regional, Washington went 2–2, defeating three-seed Georgia Tech twice and losing to host Ole Miss twice, both games by one run. The Huskies' 2014 success coincided with extensive, $15 million renovations to Husky Ballpark.

=== Conference affiliations ===
- Independent (1901–1915)
- Pacific Coast Conference (1916–1959), independent in war years of 1918 and 1944
- Pac-12 Conference (1960–2024)
  - Athletic Association of Western Universities, 1960–1966
  - Pacific-8 Conference, 1967–1978
  - Pacific-10 Conference, 1979–2011
- Big Ten Conference (2024-Present)

== Washington in the NCAA tournament ==
Year	Record	Pct	Notes
1959	1–2	.333	District 8
1992	2–2	.500	West Regional
1994	4–2	.667	Midwest II Regional
1997	3–2	.600	Mideast Regional
1998	2–2	.500	Central Regional
2002	3–2	.600	Houston Regional
2003	2–2	.500	Long Beach Regional
2004	2–2	.500	Oxford Regional
2014	2–2	.500	Oxford Regional
2016	1–2	.333	Nashville Regional
2018	5–3	.625	College World Series 7th place, Fullerton Super Regional
2023	1–2	.333	Stillwater Regional
TOTALS	27-25	.519	

== Venues ==
=== Old Graves Field ===
Although a 1931 source refers to the team's home venue simply as the "Husky ball lot," sources as early as 1936 refer to the program's home venue as Graves Field, named for Tubby Graves, the program's head coach from 1923 to 1946. The field was located directly north of Hec Ed Pavilion and east of the current Graves Hall. Oriented northeast, the infield was at the western end of the current outdoor tennis courts; its concrete grandstand continues as the Bill Quillian tennis stadium. Left and center field were displaced by the Intramural Activities Building. In addition to Washington baseball, the field hosted freshman football games and the Whitworth College (NAIA) baseball team for periods of its history.

=== Graves Field ===
With the construction of the Intramural Activities Building in the late 1960s, a new baseball field was built at the northeast corner of the UW campus. Also oriented northeast with natural grass, its center field fence was near the intersection of NE 45th Street and Union Bay Place (now Mary Gates Memorial Avenue). Originally a practice field to the new main field adjacent to the west, it became the program's venue shortly after its construction and was also named after Graves. In 1973, it underwent $19,000 renovations. It had a seating capacity of 1,500 spectators in temporary seating. Used by the program until the end of the 1997 season, it is now occupied by intramural athletic fields.

=== Husky Ballpark ===
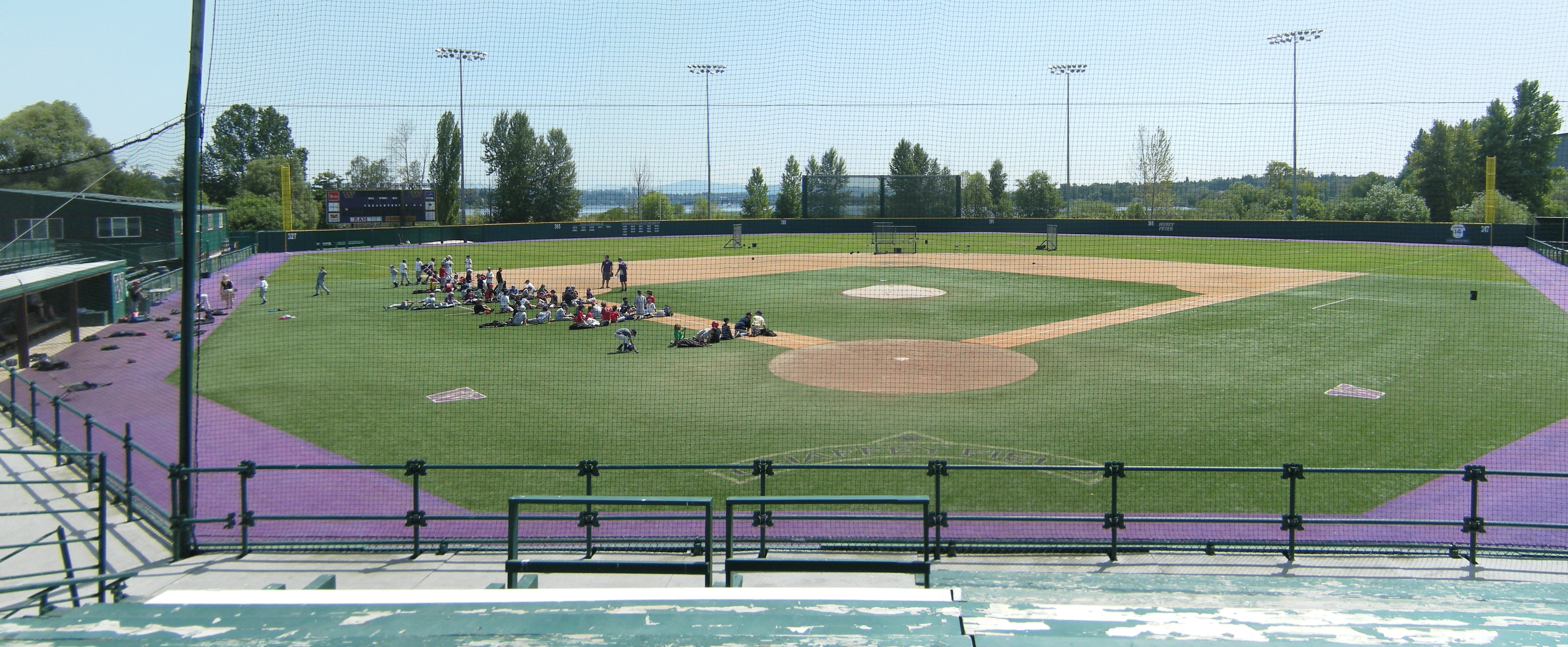
Husky Ballpark in July 2009

During the 1990s, plans for a new stadium to replace Graves Field were announced. Ground was broken in 1997 and the $4.75 million Husky Ballpark hosted its first regular season game in late February 1998. Oriented southeast, it is located north of Husky Stadium and northeast of the site of Old Graves Field. It featured an AstroTurf infield, changed to FieldTurf in 2005, with a well-draining natural grass outfield. It had a seating capacity of 2,212 and employed only temporary bleachers for its first 16 seasons, through May 2013.

==== Renovation ====
Plans were announced in 2011 for a $15 million building project on a new Husky Ballpark. The new stadium, over a decade overdue, was completed the start of the 2014 season; the new concrete grandstand will have a capacity of 2,500 spectators. In addition to chairbacked seating behind home plate, it features berm seating past the left field fence. The grass outfield has been removed and the entire field is FieldTurf, with only the pitcher's mound as dirt.

=== Alternate venues ===
==== Sick's Stadium ====
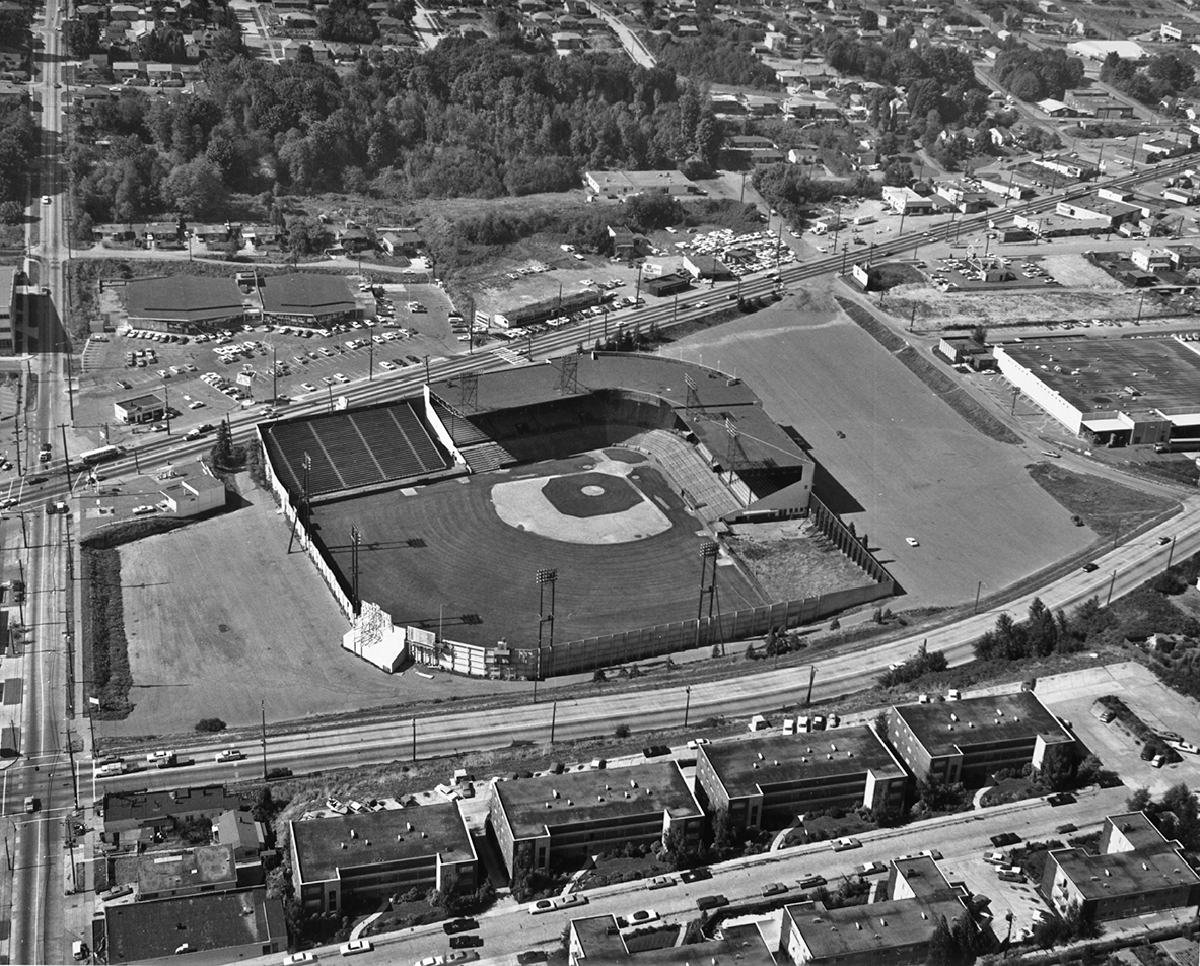
Sick's Stadium in 1967

While Graves Field was renovated during the 1973 season, the Huskies used Sick's Stadium as its home field. The stadium opened in 1938 and was a major league venue for one season, the home field of the Seattle Pilots in 1969. Without a baseball tenant after 1976, it was salvaged in the late 1970s and demolished in 1979.

==== Kingdome ====
The Huskies played early season tournaments and occasional home games in the Kingdome, which was demolished in March 2000.

==== Safeco Field ====
Since the 2007 season, the program has played a single conference game per season at Safeco Field, home of the Seattle Mariners.

== Head coaches ==
The program's most successful head coach is Ken Knutson, who coached the team from 1993 to 2009 and had 584 wins. Its longest tenured head coach is Tubby Graves, who coached for 24 seasons (1923–1946).

Year(s)	Coach	Seasons	W-L-T	Pct
1901	Fred Schock	1	4–6	.400
1903	F. W. Knight	1	8–5	.615
1904–1905	Thorpe	2	10–11–1	.476
1906, 1909–10, 1915–16, 1918–19	Dode Brinker	7	59–28	.678
1907	Loren Grinstead	1	7–6	.538
1908	William Dehn	1	10–12	.455
1911–1912	Bill Hurley	2	14–15	.483
1913	James Clark	1	5–7–1	.417
1914	George Ingle	1	5–3	.625
1920–1921	Stub Allison	2	15–8–1	.652
1922	Robert L. Mathews	1	15–3	.833
1923–1946	Tubby Graves	24	234–131–4	.641
1947–1949	Art McLarney	3	23–23	.500
1950–1953	Warren Tappin	4	41–37–2	.526
1954–1955	Bill Marx	2	36–21	.632
1956	Joe Budnick	1	5–6	.455
1957–1960	Dale Parker	4	73–48	.603
1961–1963	Carmen Mauro	3	29–45–1	.392
1964–1971	Ken Lehman	8	96–177	.352
1972–1976	Bubba Morton	5	48–101	.322
1977–1992	Bob MacDonald	16	423–320–7	.569
1993–2009	Ken Knutson	17	584–399–2	.594
2010–2022	Lindsay Meggs	13	352–325–1	.520
2023–2024	Jason Kelly	2	54–51–1	.514
2025-present	Eddie Smith	2	54-60	.474
TOTALS	24	126	2209–1886–20	.539

== Yearly records ==
Below is a table of the program's yearly records.

Record table
Season	Coach	Overall	Conference	Standing	Postseason
Independent (1901–1915)
1901	Fred Schock	4-6			
1902	no team				
1903	F. W. Knight	8-5			
1904	Thorpe	2-8			
1905	Thorpe	8-3-1			
1906	Dode Brinker	7-6			
1907	Loren Grinstead	7-6			
1908	William Dehn	10-12			
1909	Dode Brinker	14-6			
1910	Dode Brinker	16-6			
1911	Bill Hurley	9-11			
1912	Bill Hurley	5-4			
1913	James Clark	5-7-1			
1914	George Ingle	5-3			
1915	Dode Brinker	2-5			
Independent:		102-88-2			
Pacific Coast Conference (1916–1959)
1916	Dode Brinker	4-5	3-5	4th	
1917	no team				
1918	Dode Brinker	6-0	Independent		
1919	Dode Brinker	10-0	10-0	1st	
1920	Stub Allison	8-4	8-4	2nd	
1921	Stub Allison	7-4-1	7-4-1	3rd	
1922	Robert L. Mathews	15-3	8-2	1st	
1923	Tubby Graves	16-4	8-1	1st (North)	
1924	Tubby Graves	15-6-1	10-5-1	2nd	
1925	Tubby Graves	11-2	8-2	1st (North)	
1926	Tubby Graves	8-3	8-3	1st (North)	
1927	Tubby Graves	7-7	5-4	4th (North)	
1928	Tubby Graves	6-4	4-4	4th (North)	
1929	Tubby Graves	12-7	9-6	1st (North)	
1930	Tubby Graves	10-3	10-3	1st (North)	
1931	Tubby Graves	13-3	13-3	1st (North)	
1932	Tubby Graves	15-4	13-4	1st (North)	
1933	Tubby Graves	7-3	3-3	t-2nd (North)	
1934	Tubby Graves	8-8	6-8	4th (North)	
1935	Tubby Graves	13-13-1	10-6	2nd (North)	
1936	Tubby Graves	15-10	9-7	t-2nd (North)	
1937	Tubby Graves	7-7	7-7	3rd (North)	
1938	Tubby Graves	7-15-1	4-12	5th (North)	
1939	Tubby Graves	9-12	6-10	4th (North)	
1940	Tubby Graves	7-13	4-11	5th (North)	
1941	Tubby Graves	10-6	10-6	2nd (North)	
1942	Tubby Graves	8-8	8-8	2nd (North)	
1943	Tubby Graves	10-7	8-7	3rd (North)	
1944	Tubby Graves	5-5-1	Independent		
1945	Tubby Graves	4-9	2-2	2nd (North)	
1946	Tubby Graves	11-7	8-8	3rd (North)	
1947	Art McLarney	9-7	9-7	2nd (North)	
1948	Art McLarney	8-7	8-7	2nd (North)	
1949	Art McLarney	6-9	6-9	4th (North)	
1950	Warren Tappin	9-6	9-6	2nd (North)	
1951	Warren Tappin	14-7-1	10-6	t-2nd (North)	
1952	Warren Tappin	14-9	10-6	t-1st (North)	
1953	Warren Tappin	4-15-1	1-11	5th (North)	
1954	Bill Marx	18-10	10-6	t-2nd (North)	
1955	Bill Marx	18-11	7-7	4th (North)	
1956	Joe Budnick	5-6	5-4	4th (North)	
1957	Dale Parker	20-11	8-8	3rd (North)	
1958	Dale Parker	12-13	3-10	5th (North)	
1959	Dale Parker	21-12	9-3	1st (North)	NCAA Regional
PCC:		431-300-6	291-232		
AAWU, Pac-8/10/12 Conference (1960–present)
1960	Dale Parker	20-12	7-8	4th (North)	
1961	Carmen Mauro	13-10-1	4-8	5th (North)	
1962	Carmen Mauro	9-18	3-13	5th (North)	
1963	Carmen Mauro	7-17	3-11	5th (North)	
1964	Ken Lehman	12-14	6-10	4th (North)	
1965	Ken Lehman	17-24	3-15	4th (North)	
1966	Ken Lehman	20-16	6-10	3rd (North)	
Pac-8 (1967–1978)
1967	Ken Lehman	8-27	1-13	8th	
1968	Ken Lehman	15-26	2-18	8th	
1969	Ken Lehman	7-29	1-20	8th	
1970	Ken Lehman	8-22	4-12	4th (North)	
1971	Ken Lehman	9-19	1-14	4th (North)	
1972	Bubba Morton	13-18	5-12	3rd (North)	
1973	Bubba Morton	10-11	7-11	3rd (North)	
1974	Bubba Morton	10-28	5-12	t-3rd (North)	
1975	Bubba Morton	8-17	2-13	4th (North)	
1976	Bubba Morton	7-27	2-16	4th (North)	
1977	Bob MacDonald	19-20-3	6-12	3rd (North)	
1978	Bob MacDonald	29-16-2	5-12-1	4th (North)	
Pac-10 (1979–2011)
1979	Bob MacDonald	37-13	11-5	2nd (North)	
1980	Bob MacDonald	33-20	6-9	3rd (North)	
1981	Bob MacDonald	34-18-1	12-6	1st (North)	
1982	Bob MacDonald	22-24	10-14	t-5th (North)	
1983	Bob MacDonald	25-16-1	12-11	3rd (North)	
1984	Bob MacDonald	16-27	6-15	7th (North)	
1985	Bob MacDonald	36-12	15-9	2nd (North)	Pac-10 North Division Tournament
1986	Bob MacDonald	25-23	9-14	6th (North)	Pac-10 North Division Tournament
1987	Bob MacDonald	21-20	11-13	5th (North)	Pac-10 North Division Tournament
1988	Bob MacDonald	17-28	8-16	6th (North)	Pac-10 North Division Tournament
1989	Bob MacDonald	13-20	9-15	6th (North)	Pac-10 North Division Tournament
1990	Bob MacDonald	30-19	14-10	3rd (North)	Pac-10 North Division Tournament
1991	Bob MacDonald	27-23	8-12	t-4th (North)	Pac-10 North Division Tournament
1992	Bob MacDonald	39-21	20-10	1st (North)	NCAA Regional
1993	Ken Knutson	39-19	22-8	1st (North)	
1994	Ken Knutson	46-18	20-10	2nd (North)	NCAA Regional final
1995	Ken Knutson	24-30	16-14	2nd (North)	
1996	Ken Knutson	30-28	16-8	1st (North)	
1997	Ken Knutson	46-20	20-4	1st (North)	NCAA Regional final
1998	Ken Knutson	41-17	17-7	1st (North)	NCAA Regional
1999	Ken Knutson	33-23	12-12	t-5th	
2000	Ken Knutson	26-30	7-17	8th	
2001	Ken Knutson	29-23	7-17	8th	
2002	Ken Knutson	33-27-1	15-9	t-3rd	NCAA Regional final
2003	Ken Knutson	42-18	15-9	3rd	NCAA Regional
2004	Ken Knutson	39-20-1	15-9	2nd	NCAA Regional final
2005	Ken Knutson	33-22	12-12	6th	
2006	Ken Knutson	36-25	11-13	t-5th	
2007	Ken Knutson	29-27	11-13	5th	
2008	Ken Knutson	33-22	11-13	t-6th	
2009	Ken Knutson	25-30	13-14	t-5th	
2010	Lindsay Meggs	28-28	11-16	9th	
2011	Lindsay Meggs	17-37	6-21	10th	
Pac-12 (2012–2024)
2012	Lindsay Meggs	29–25	13–17	7th	
2013	Lindsay Meggs	24–32	15–15	t-6th	
2014	Lindsay Meggs	41–17–1	21–9	2nd	NCAA Regional final
2015	Lindsay Meggs	29–25	14–16	7th	
2016	Lindsay Meggs	33–23	17–13	2nd	NCAA Regional
2017	Lindsay Meggs	28–26	14–16	7th	
2018	Lindsay Meggs	35–26	20–10	3rd	College World Series
2019	Lindsay Meggs	28–24	12–17	8th	
2020	Lindsay Meggs	9–6	0–0	N/A	
2021	Lindsay Meggs	20–30	6–21	11th	
2022	Lindsay Meggs	30–26	14–16	t-6th	
2023	Jason Kelly	35-20	17-12	3rd	NCAA Regional
2024	Jason Kelly	19-31-1	10-20	9th	
AAWU, Pac-8/10/12:		1546–1382–11	623–778–1		
Total:		1968–1643–19			
National champion Postseason invitational champion Conference regular season champion Conference regular season and conference tournament champion Division regular season champion Division regular season and conference tournament champion Conference tournament champion

Year	Record	Pct	Notes
1959	1-2	.333	District 8
1992	2-2	.500	West Regional
1994	4-2	.667	Midwest II Regional
1997	3-2	.600	Mideast Regional
1998	2-2	.500	Central Regional
2002	3-2	.600	Houston Regional
2003	2-2	.500	Long Beach Regional
2004	2-2	.500	Oxford Regional
2014	2-2	.500	Oxford Regional
2016	1-2	.333	Nashville Regional
2018	5-3	.625	College World Series**
2023	1-2	.333	Stillwater Regional

  - NCAA APPEARANCE VACATED DUE TO NCAA VIOLATIONS AT PROGRAM

== Notable former players ==
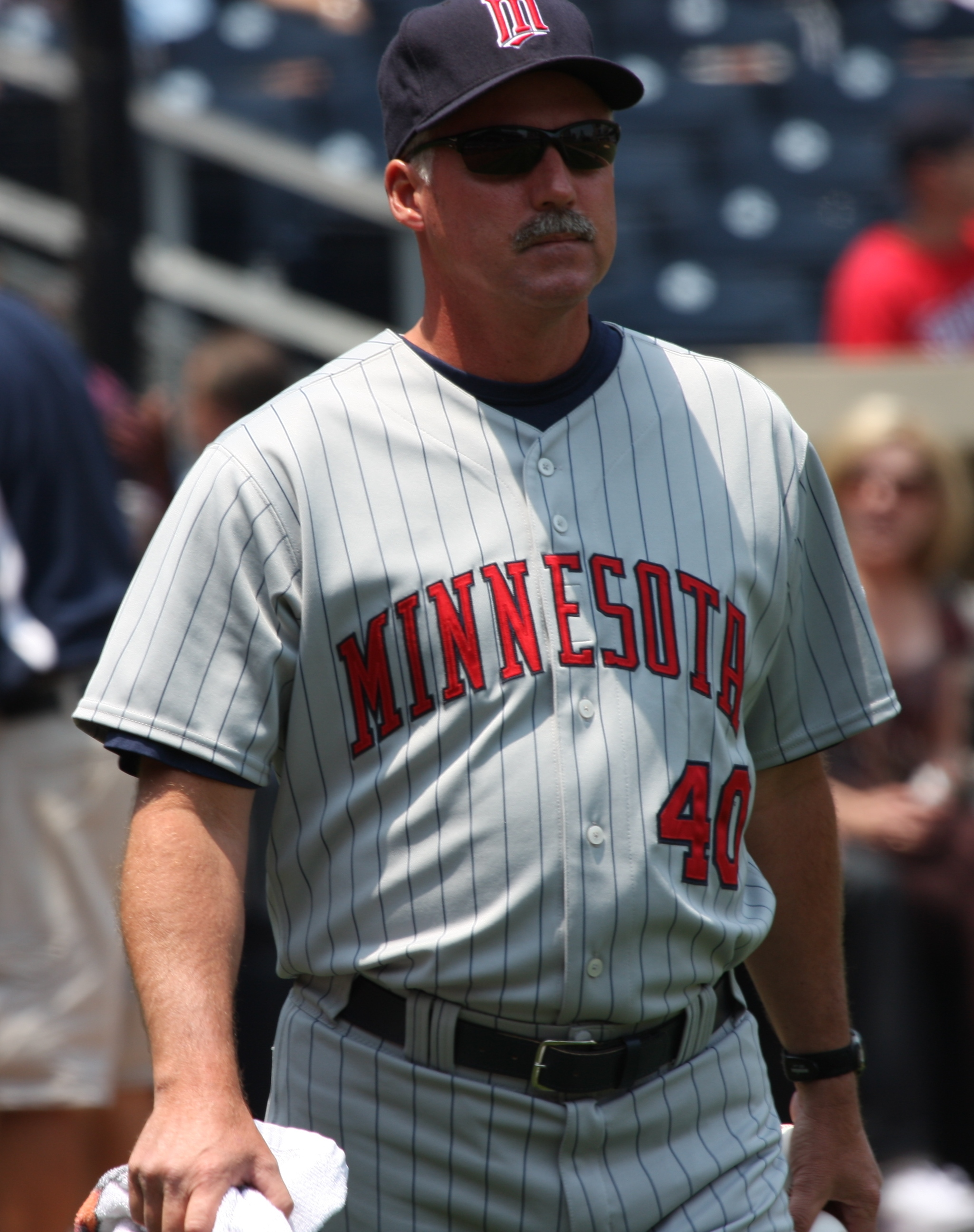
Rick Anderson

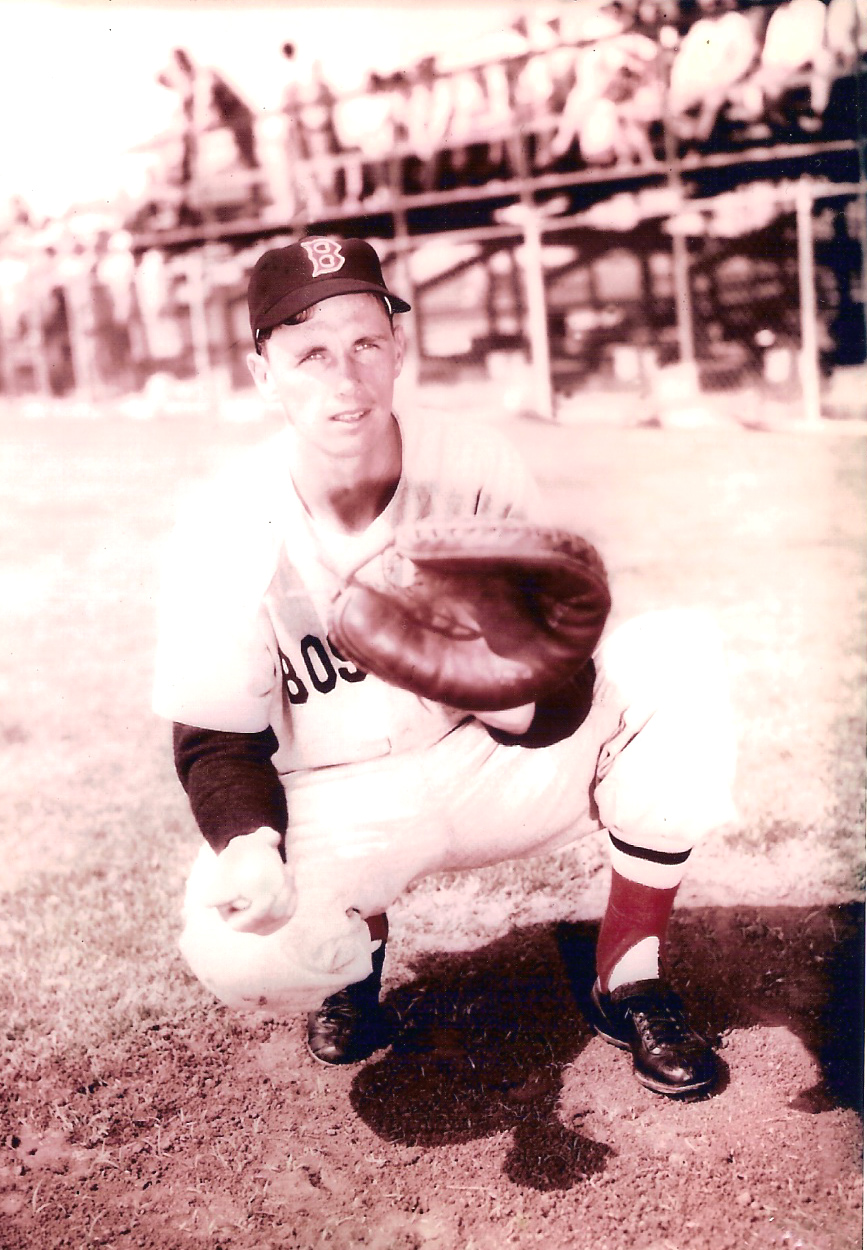
Sammy White

The following is a list of notable former Huskies and the seasons in which they played for the program.

- Rick Anderson (1978)
- Tracy Baker (1910)
- Braden Bishop
- Mike Blowers (1986)
- Dode Brinker (1903–1905)
- Scott Brow (1988–1990)
- Nick Hagadone (2005–2007)
- Matt Hague (2005–2007)
- Bill Hutchinson (1929–1930)
- Chet Johnson (1937–1939)
- Rondin Johnson (1978–1980)
- Jake Lamb (2010–2012)
- Hal Lee (1932–1934)
- Brent Lillibridge (2003–2005)
- Tim Lincecum (2004–2006)
- Chris Magruder (1996–1998)
- Aaron Myette (1996)
- Tony Savage (1914)
- Hunky Shaw (1905)
- Max Soriano (1946–1949)
- Sean Spencer (1994–1995)
- Kevin Stocker (1989–1991)
- Sammy White (1947–1948)
- Sean White (2000–2003)

=== Retired numbers ===
The program has retired one jersey number.

No.	Player	Position	Career
14	Tim Lincecum	P	2004-2006

=== See also ===
- Washington Huskies baseball players

== Major League Baseball draft ==
=== 2012 MLB draft ===
Four Huskies were selected in the 2012 Major League Baseball draft: 3B Jacob Lamb by the Arizona Diamondbacks (6th round), P Aaron West by the Houston Astros (17th round), OF Chase Anselment by the Atlanta Braves (17th round), and C B.K. Santy by the Minnesota Twins (30th round). All four players signed professional contracts with their respective teams.

Three Huskies were selected in the 2013 Major League Baseball Draft: Pitcher Austin Voth by the Washington Nationals (5th round), Pitcher Tyler Kane by the Miami Marlins (38th round), and Shortstop Ty Afenir by the New York Yankees (39th round). All three signed with their respective teams.
