= To Pay the Price =

To Pay the Price is a 2009 play by Peter-Adrian Cohen based in part on the letters of Israeli military officer Yonatan Netanyahu, who was killed in action during Operation Entebbe at Entebbe airport, by Ugandan soldiers, when the Israeli military rescued hostages after an aircraft hijacking by Palestinian terrorists. Netanyahu was the leader of the assault

The play, produced by North Carolina's Theatre Or opened off-off Broadway in New York in June 2009 during the Festival of Jewish Theater and Ideas.' In addition to Netanyahu's letters, the playwright drew on interviews he conducted with Netanyahu's friends and family.

The play had been scheduled to run at the New Repertory Theatre company near Boston, Massachusetts in 2008. The run was canceled by the Netanyahu family because the theater was intending to run the play as a companion piece to My Name is Rachel Corrie, a story of a pro-Palestinian American activist.
