= Cohen on the Bridge =

- Directed by: Andrew Wainrib
- Produced by: Elan Frank, Andrew Wainrib
- Release date: 2009
- Running time: 20 minutes
- Country: Israel

Cohen on the Bridge is an animated short documentary about Operation Entebbe by director Andrew Wainrib.

The film won the St. Louis International Film Festival's Festival Prize and was an Award Winner at the Palm Springs International Shortfest.

It was exhibited in 2010 and 2011 at the Big Sky Documentary Film Festival in Missoula, Montana, the Tallgrass Film Festival in Wichita, Kansas, the Jerusalem International Film Festival, and the Santa Barbara International Film Festival in Santa Barbara, California.
