= Bill Marx =

American arts critic

Bill Marx is a theater critic based in Boston, Massachusetts. Marx served as theater and arts critic for WBUR from 1982 to 2006 and as the host of a podcast dedicated to books in translation for WGBH (FM) and Public Radio International's The World (radio program) from 2007 to 2011.

Since 1982, Marx has also written about arts and culture for print, broadcast, and online media outlets including The Boston Globe, The Boston Phoenix, The Washington Post Book World, The Nation, The Boston Review, the Los Angeles Times, Boston Magazine, Columbia Journalism Review, Parnassus, Ploughshares, TheaterWeek, The Village Voice, Tab Communications, and The Boston Ledger.

Marx won United Press International and Associated Press awards for his radio reviews of Boston theater. He has been a finalist for the National Book Critics Circle Award three times. Under's Marx's leadership, WBUR Online Arts also won an Online Journalism Award for Specialty Journalism (Small Site).

Since 2007, Marx has been a full-time lecturer at Boston University, teaching courses on the history of American arts criticism and the contemporary novel for the Boston University College of Fine Arts and Boston University College of Arts and Sciences.

As Editor in Chief of The Arts Fuse, a non-profit web magazine Marx launched in July 2007, Marx helped increase editorial coverage of the arts and culture across Boston and New England. The Arts Fuse has published more than 1,700 articles from 60 expert writers and critics.

Marx began publishing The Arts Fuse in reaction to the declining arts coverage in newspapers, magazines, radio, and television, creating a site that could experiments with professional online arts criticism, looking at new and innovative ways to use online platforms to evolve cultural conversations and bring together critics, readers, and artists.

In 2011, The Arts Fuse received a grant from Mass Humanities for its Judicial Review, an online, in-depth, and interactive discussion of the issues raised by the arts on The Arts Fuse. The Arts Fuse also won CBS Boston's Most Valuable Blogger Award in 2011.

Marx's professional affiliations include for the Best Translated Book Awards, Fiction judge, beginning in 2010, on the Boston Theater Critics Association's Awards Committee from 1994 to 2006, and on the National Book Critics Circle's board of directors from 1995 to 1997.
