= Bill Brinker =

American baseball player (1883-1965)

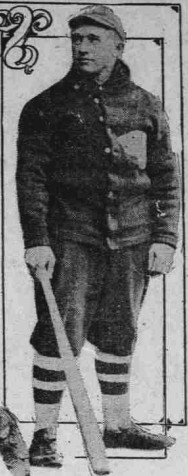
- Outfielder / Third baseman
- Born: August 30, 1883; Warrensburg, Missouri, U.S.
- Died: February 5, 1965 (aged 81); Arcadia, California, U.S.
- Batted: Both Threw: Right

MLB debut
- April 24, 1912, for the Philadelphia Phillies

Last MLB appearance
- May 27, 1912, for the Philadelphia Phillies

MLB statistics
- Batting average: .222
- Home runs: 0
- Runs batted in: 2
- Stats at Baseball Reference

Teams
- Philadelphia Phillies (1912)

William Hutchinson "Dodo" Brinker (August 30, 1883 – February 5, 1965) was an American Major League Baseball (MLB) outfielder and third baseman. Brinker played for the Philadelphia Phillies in the 1912 season. In 9 career games, he had 4 hits in 18 at-bats. He batted right and left and threw right-handed.

He attended the University of Washington. He played college baseball for the Huskies from 1903–1905 and was the program's head coach 1906, 1909–1910, 1915–1916, and 1918–1919.

Brinker was born in Warrensburg, Missouri and died in Arcadia, California.
