= Arts criticism =

Process of describing and judging art

Arts criticism is the process of describing, analyzing, interpreting, and judging works of art. The disciplines of arts criticism can be defined by the object being considered rather than the methodology (through analysis of its philosophy): buildings (architecture criticism), paintings (visual art criticism), performances (dance criticism, theatre criticism), music (music journalism), visual media (film criticism, television criticism), or literary texts (literary criticism).

Criticism of the arts can be broadly divided into two types. There is academic criticism such as that found in scholarly works and specialist journals, then there is criticism of a more journalistic nature (often called 'a review') which is seen by a wider public through newspapers, television and radio. The academic criticism will be of a more vigorous and analytical nature than the journalistic, the journalistic may even focus on entertaining the reader at the expense of detail about the art under discussion.

== See also ==
- Art critic
- Art criticism
- Critic
- Cultural critic
- Genre studies
- Theatre criticism
