= Peter-Adrian Cohen =

American dramatist

Peter-Adrian Cohen (also known as Peter Cohen) (16.11.1939 † 07.03.2016) was an American writer. He grew up in Zürich, Switzerland, and lived in Boston.

== Career ==
While studying at Harvard Business School Cohen wrote the 1973 best-seller, The Gospel According to the Harvard Business School. It is a "sophisticated" and "negative" look at the Business School.

He is the author of To Pay the Price, a play about Yonatan Netanyahu, and " Verstehn Sie Mich, Herr Goldfarb" (Do You Understand Me, Herr Goldfarb?", a play.

== Plays ==
- To Pay the Price
- "Why Worry?"
- The Court Jew
- A Ship to Zion
- Verstehn Sie mich, Herr Goldfarb? – Do You Understand Me, Mr. Goldfarb?
- Im Namen Gottes (In the Name of God), scenic reading, about 9/11. First given in Zürich, Sept. 10, 2011 and then Sept. 11 in Bonn (Germany) and Cambridge (MA).
