= Terror's Advocate =

- Directed by: Barbet Schroeder
- Produced by: Rita Dagher
- Cinematography: Caroline Champetier; Jean-Luc Perréard
- Edited by: Nelly Quettier
- Music by: Jorge Arriagada
- Distributed by: Les Films du Losange (France); Magnolia Pictures (USA)
- Release date: 2007
- Running time: 135 minutes
- Country: France
- Languages: English; French; German; Khmer

Terror's Advocate (French: L'Avocat de la terreur) is a 2007 French feature documentary film on controversial lawyer Jacques Vergès. Produced by Rita Dagher and directed by Barbet Schroeder, it explores how Vergès assisted, from the 1960s onwards, anti-imperialist terrorist cells operating in Africa, Europe, and the Middle East. The film contains no narration and uses archival footage, stills and interviews to propel the plot forward. It features interviews with Vergès himself, with people involved in his life, and with people who have investigated it.

Participants interviewed include Algerian nationalists Yacef Saadi, Zohra Drif, Djamila Bouhired and Abderrahmane Benhamida, Khmer Rouge members Nuon Chea and Khieu Samphan, once far-left activists Hans-Joachim Klein and Magdalena Kopp, terrorist Carlos the Jackal, lawyer Isabelle Coutant-Peyre, neo-Nazi Ahmed Huber, Palestinian politician Bassam Abu Sharif, Lebanese politician Karim Pakradouni, political cartoonist Siné, former spy Claude Moniquet, novelist and ghostwriter Lionel Duroy, and investigative journalist Oliver Schröm.

The film premiered in the Un Certain Regard section at the 2007 Cannes Film Festival and won the César Award for Best Documentary Feature at the 33rd César Awards.

== Synopsis ==
After a prologue which shows Vergès downplaying Khmer Rouge atrocities and emphasizing the U.S. role in the Cambodian genocide, the film flashes back to his postwar involvement as an anticolonial activist and lawyer for the National Liberation Front (FLN) of Algeria. Is depicted in particular his fight for Djamila Bouhired's liberation. The film highlights the unofficial role of lawyers as liaison agents between prisoners in the Algerian revolution and Vergès' original technique of defense, called "rupture strategy," in which the lawyer accuses the prosecution of the same offense as the defendant. It then chronicles Vergès' efforts to act in favor of the Palestinian fedayeen.

The second part tries to elucidate what Vergès did during his "missing years". While acknowledging that Vergès was eager to take part in further revolutionary efforts in the Third World, the director's inquiry dismisses the usual claims that he spent these years in Pol Pot's Kampuchea. It implies instead that he moved back and forth between Paris and destinations abroad, hiding from creditors and looking for money. Revelations are made that before he went into hiding, he was paid amidst the Congo Crisis to bring out Moise Tshombe from prison and that he vanished without having done so. The film also suggests that he worked behind the lines for Wadie Haddad's branch of the PFLP.

The last part is dedicated to the role Vergès played in the 1980s as an accomplice of Carlos the Jackal and Johannes Weinrich in Eastern Europe, as well as an intermediary in negotiations between France and Iranian-backed terrorists. It also features the famous Klaus Barbie trial, during which Vergès acted as Barbie's lawyer and notably tried to discredit France in its charging of Barbie by equating the Nazi occupation of France with the past French rule in Algeria. The film closes in the early 1990s, with Carlos being abducted by the French intelligence and with the release of Stasi files containing evidence of Vergès' cloak-and-dagger attitude in the past decade, which put an end to his activities.

One key point of the documentary is the revelation of the link between Vergès and François Genoud, a Swiss Nazi who bankrolled many anti-Western initiatives in the second part of the 20th century—be they right-wing, left-wing, secular or Islamic-inspired, including Algerian and Palestinian nationalists as well as far-right and far-left European militants. It shows that Vergès and Genoud were friends from the 1960s to the 1990s and that Vergès defended in court a number of people whose defense was funded by Genoud, including the FLN, Carlos, Barbie, Bruno Bréguet and Magdalena Kopp.

== Reception ==
The film received generally favorable reviews from critics. As of January 5, 2008, the review aggregator Rotten Tomatoes reported that 85% of critics gave the film positive reviews, based on 40 reviews. Metacritic reported the film had an average score of 75 out of 100, based on 17 reviews.

Kenneth Turan of Los Angeles Times named it the 3rd best film of 2007 (along with Into Great Silence), and J. Hoberman of The Village Voice named it the 8th best film of 2007.

Director Wes Anderson included Terror's Advocate on a list of recommended films in the online newsletter Goop.
