= Kevin Coogan =

American journalist (1952–2020)

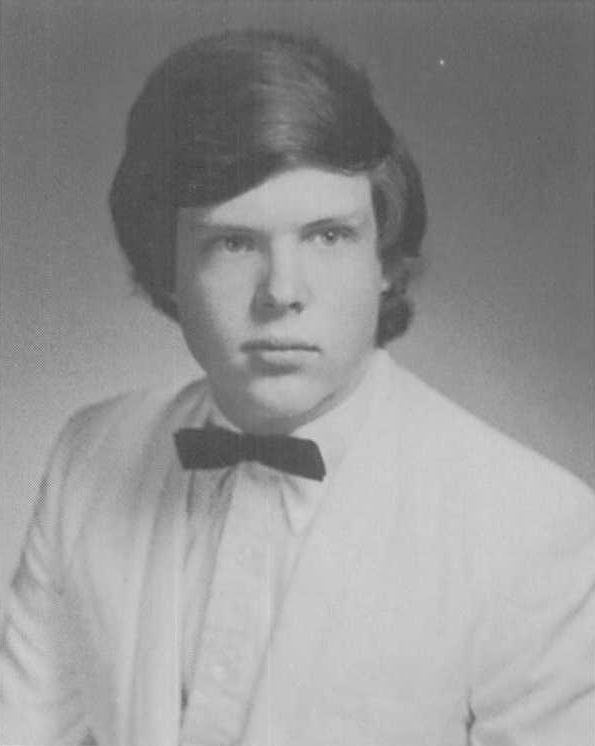
- Coogan at La Salle College High School, 1970
- Born: Kevin J. Coogan; October 8, 1952; Philadelphia, Pennsylvania, U.S.
- Died: February 27, 2020 (aged 67); New York City, New York, U.S.
- Education: Sarah Lawrence College
- Occupations: Investigative journalist, author
- Writing career
- Pen name: Hylozoic Hedgehog
- Language: English
- Subject: Political networks
- Notable work: Dreamer of the Day

Kevin J. Coogan (October 8, 1952 – February 27, 2020) was an American investigative journalist and author. He is most well known as the author of the 1999 book Dreamer of the Day, a biography of the fascist writer Francis Parker Yockey. Dreamer of the Day was the only book of Coogan's published while he was alive. Posthumously, two more books were published: The Spy Who Would Be Tsar in 2021, about Polish spy Michal Goleniewski, and Tracing Japanese Leftist Political Activism (1957 – 2017) in 2022 with Claudia Derichs. Many of his works focused on political networks.

With fellow journalist Martin A. Lee, he interviewed and wrote one of the first investigations into fascist François Genoud in 1987. He was a freelance writer for several outlets, writing for The Village Voice, Hit List, Mother Jones, and The Nation. He wrote an exposé essay on Michael J. Moynihan and his associates, entitled "How 'Black' Is Black Metal?" He is also known for his writings on the LaRouche movement, which Coogan was a member of until he left in 1979.

== Early life and education ==
Kevin J. Coogan was born October 8, 1952. Coogan was raised in Philadelphia. He was of Irish descent, and his grandparents ran a boarding house for Irish immigrants. Both of his parents were writers. His father, Joseph Coogan, was a veteran of World War II and theater actor, while Coogan's mother was a writer and editor of a nursing magazine. He had a sister, Nell. In high school, he was a member of Students for a Democratic Society. He later moved to New York City.

He attended Sarah Lawrence College. While at Sarah Lawrence, he joined the National Caucus of Labor Committees (NCLC), founded by Lyndon LaRouche. He became a member of their intelligence staff and "Asia file". He then left Sarah Lawrence and became a taxi driver in New York City. He described this as "in a way a paid vacation [from a] pretty nasty cult". He worked other odd jobs. He quit the NCLC in 1979 when he discovered its ties to the far-right and antisemitic Willis Carto and the Liberty Lobby. Several other members of the NCLC resigned for the same reason. He returned to Sarah Lawrence that year. He received a degree from Sarah Lawrence in 1983.

== Career ==
After graduating, he became a freelance writer. Coogan was interested in a variety of obscure groups, including sects and groups on the left and right-wing, third positionists, and political networks. He wrote articles in the journal Patterns of Prejudice, as well as for The Village Voice, Mother Jones, and The Nation. He also wrote for Jeff Bale's music magazine Hit List, Lobster, and Le Monde diplomatique. Coogan was also an in-house book reviewer for Routledge, where he reviewed English and French books on political subjects, and did freelance copyediting.

He received a grant for European research in the 1980s. Based on this grant, Coogan, with fellow journalist Martin A. Lee, met fascist François Genoud and interviewed him in Lausanne in 1986. Genoud only agreed to meet with Coogan and Lee with the condition that the interview not be taped and he not be directly quoted. The article that resulted from their research came out in Mother Jones in May 1987, the only American journalistic investigation into Genoud while he was alive. They also interviewed Jacques Vergès, an associate of Genoud. Coogan interviewed Ahmed Huber, leftist turned Islamist and far-right radical. Coogan wrote articles criticizing the Center for Democracy and Lech Wałęsa. In 1988, Coogan claimed that Iona Andronov had entirely fabricated an interview that he had claimed to have had with him on the subject. Coogan presented on the topic of 1950s transnational political networks at the International Institute of Social History in 2004.

== Works ==
In Hit List, he wrote an exposé essay in 1999 on Michael J. Moynihan and his book Lords of Chaos, entitled "How 'Black' Is Black Metal? Michael Moynihan, Lords of Chaos, and the 'Countercultural Fascist'", which explored his circle and accused Moynihan and many of his associates of being fascists. He afterwards had an exchange with Moynihan's publisher Adam Parfrey in the same magazine, who accused him of being "incredibly wrong" about the topic. Moynihan denied that he was a fascist.

Coogan is most well known as the author of the 1999 book Dreamer of the Day, a biography of the fascist writer Francis Parker Yockey. The book was published in 1999 by Autonomedia. Coogan spent 10 years working on the book. Dreamer of the Day was the only book of Coogan's published while he was alive. He wrote a manuscript in the 1980s, entitled Red Swastika, about the Russian political activist Aleksandr Dugin and National Bolshevism. He did not like the work, and never published it, calling it a "historical curiosity". Another unpublished manuscript, Marx, Russia and the Great Game, focused on Marx's writings on Imperialism and Russia. Coogan wrote several critical documents on the LaRouche movement, which were published online. He published these pseudonymously under the name "Hylozoic Hedgehog". One such manuscript was Smiling Man from a Dead Planet: The Mystery of Lyndon LaRouche.

Coogan assisted in the research of the books The Beast Reawakens by Martin A. Lee and Black Sun by Nicholas Goodrick-Clarke, among others. Posthumously, a second book authored by Coogan, The Spy Who Would Be Tsar: The Mystery of Michal Goleniewski and the Alt-Right Underground, was published in 2021, about Michal Goleniewski. This book was completed prior to his death. A third book, Tracing Japanese Leftist Political Activism (1957 – 2017): The Boomerang Flying Transnational, was completed after his death by Claudia Derichs and published in 2022.

== Death ==
Coogan died on February 27, 2020, in New York City. His death was unexpected.

== Bibliography ==
=== As Kevin Coogan ===
- —— (1999). Dreamer of the Day: Francis Parker Yockey and the Postwar Fascist International. Brooklyn: Autonomedia. ISBN 1-57027-039-2.
- —— (2021). The Spy Who Would Be Tsar: The Mystery of Michal Goleniewski and the Alt-Right Underground. New York: Routledge. ISBN 978-1-00-039987-5.
- ——; Derichs, Claudia (2022). Tracing Japanese Leftist Political Activism (1957 – 2017): The Boomerang Flying Transnational. New York: Routledge. ISBN 978-0-367-64138-2.

=== As Hylozoic Hedgehog ===
- —— (2009). Smiling Man from a Dead Planet: The Mystery of Lyndon LaRouche. LaRouche Planet.
- —— (2012). How It All Began: The Origins and History of the National Caucus of Labor Committees in New York and Philadelphia (1966–1971). LaRouche Planet.
