= Jacques Vergès =

French lawyer, political activist and writer (1925–2013)

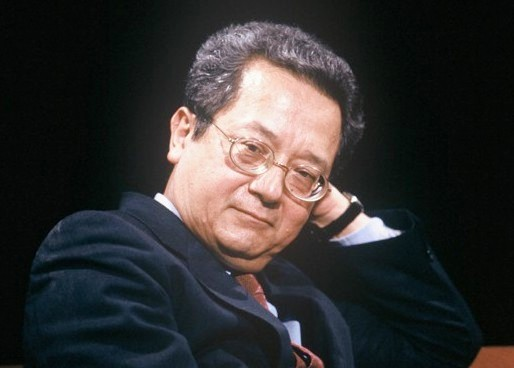
- Vergès appearing on the British TV programme After Dark in 1987: "Klaus Barbie"
- Born: 5 March 1925; Ubon Ratchathani, Siam (now Thailand)
- Died: 15 August 2013 (aged 88); Paris, France
- Education: University of Paris law degree
- Occupation: Lawyer
- Known for: Lawyer who represented well-known war criminals
- Spouse: Djamila Bouhired
- Children: Jacques-Loys Vergès (1951), Meriem Vergès (1967), Liess Vergès (1969)
- Parent(s): Raymond Vergès, Pham Thi Khang
- Relatives: Paul Vergès (brother)

Jacques Vergès (French pronunciation: [ʒak vɛʁʒɛs]; 5 March 1925 – 15 August 2013) was a French-Algerian lawyer of Vietnamese origin and anti-colonial activist. Vergès began as a fighter in the French Resistance during World War II, under Charles de Gaulle's Free French forces. After becoming a lawyer, he became well known for his defense of FLN militants during the Algerian War of Independence. He was later involved in a number of controversial and high-profile legal cases, with a series of defendants charged with terrorism, serial murder, crimes against humanity, and war crimes. This includes Nazi officer Klaus Barbie, "the Butcher of Lyon", in 1987, terrorist Carlos the Jackal in 1994, and former Khmer Rouge head of state Khieu Samphan in 2008. He also defended infamous Holocaust denier Roger Garaudy in 1998, as well as members of the Baader-Meinhof gang. As a result of taking on such clients, he garnered criticism from members of the public, including intellectuals Bernard-Henri Lévy and Alain Finkielkraut, political activist Gerry Gable and Nazi hunter Serge Klarsfeld.

Vergès attracted widespread public attention in the 1950s for his use of trials as a forum for expressing views against French colonial rule in Algeria, questioning the authority of the prosecution and causing chaos in proceedings – a method he promoted as "rupture defense" in his book De la stratégie judiciaire. He was imprisoned for his activism in 1960 and temporarily lost his license to practice law. He was a supporter of the Palestinian fedayeen in the 1960s. He would later disappear from 1970 to 1978, without ever explaining his whereabouts during that period. An outspoken anti-imperialist, he continued his vocal political activism in the 2000s, including opposing the war on terror. (Note: In La démocratie à visage obscène. Le vrai catéchisme de George W. Bush, 2004, ISBN 2710327317.) The media sensationalized his activities with the sobriquet "the Devil's advocate", (Note: The sobriquet The Devil's advocate was used by the European press to describe not only Jacques Vergès but also Giovanni Di Stefano.) and Vergès himself contributed to his "notorious" public persona by such acts as titling his autobiography The Brilliant Bastard (Note: The French epithet has sometimes been translated as "luminous bastard".) and giving provocative replies in interviews, such as "I'd even defend Bush! But only if he agrees to plead guilty."

== Biography ==
Born on 5 March 1925 in Ubon Ratchathani, Siam, and brought up on the island of Réunion with his twin brother Paul Vergès, Jacques Vergès was the son of Raymond Vergès, a French doctor from Réunion, and a Vietnamese teacher named Pham Thi Khang. In 1942, with his father's encouragement, he sailed to Liverpool to become part of the Free French Forces under Charles de Gaulle, and to participate in the anti-Nazi resistance. He went on to fight in Italy, France, and Germany.

After the end of World War II he entered the University of Paris, where he enrolled in the Faculté des lettres pursuing a degree in history, studying the Hindi and Malagasy languages. In 1945 he joined the Young Communists movement of the French Communist Party, while his father was helping to organize the Reunionese Communist Party. During this time he befriended Erich Honecker, future leader of East Germany, Henri Alleg and Felix Hophouet-Boigny, future President of the Ivory Coast. He would also marry his first wife Karine at this time. His twin brother, Paul, returned to Reunion, later becoming leader of the Communist Party there, and a member of the European Parliament. In 1949 Jacques became president of the AEC (Association for Colonial Students), where he befriended Pol Pot and Khieu Samphan. In 1950, at the request of his Communist mentors, he went to Prague to lead a youth organization for four years. He returned to Paris, where he went on to study law, passing his final exams in 1955. Vergès was then elected Secrétaire of the Conférence du barreau de Paris.

=== Political activities ===
Arriving in Paris, Jacques Vergès joined the French Communist Party (PCF) in 1945. On 25 May 1946, Alexis de Villeneuve, who ran for the legislative elections under the Popular Republican Movement (MRP) against his father, Raymond Vergès, was assassinated in front of the cathedral of Saint-Denis in Réunion. The firearm used belonged to Raymond Vergès.

=== Algerian independence movement ===
After returning to France, Vergès became a lawyer and quickly gained fame for his willingness to take controversial cases. During the struggle in Algiers he defended many accused of terrorism by the French government. He was a supporter of the Algerian armed independence struggle against France, comparing it to French armed resistance to the Nazi German occupation in the 1940s. Vergès became a nationally known figure following his defence of the anti-French Algerian guerrilla Djamila Bouhired on terrorism charges: she was convicted of blowing up a café and killing eleven people inside it. This is where he pioneered the rupture strategy, in which he accused the prosecution of the same offenses as the defendants. She was sentenced to death but pardoned and freed following public pressure brought on by Vergès' efforts. After some years she married Vergès, who had by then converted to Islam. In an effort to limit Vergès' success at defending Algerian clients, he was sentenced to two months in jail in 1960 and temporarily lost his licence to officially practice law for anti-state activities. After Algeria gained its independence in 1962, Vergès obtained Algerian citizenship, going by the name of Mansour. During the Algerian War he had become acquainted with Ahmed Ben Bella of the FLN and the first President of Algeria, Swiss Nazi and financier for the FLN, François Genoud, as well as Ahmed Huber, a Swiss Muslim-convert and Nazi who covered the war as a journalist.

=== Israel and the Palestinians ===
In 1965, Vergès arrived in Israel, seeking to represent Mahmud Hijazi (מחמוד חיג'אזי), a Palestinian member of the Fatah movement who had at the time been sentenced to death by an Israeli military court on charges of terrorism, for crossing into Israel and setting a small demolition charge near the National Water Conduit in the Galilee. Israel's Justice Minister Dov Yosef forbade Hijazi's being represented by a foreign lawyer. Vergès was detained at the airport and deported. Nevertheless, though Vergès did not succeed in getting to represent Hijazi in court, his initiative generated considerable publicity and controversy which were influential in Hijazi's death sentence being eventually commuted by an appeals court. (Hijazi was later released in a 1971 prisoner exchange.)

=== Missing years ===
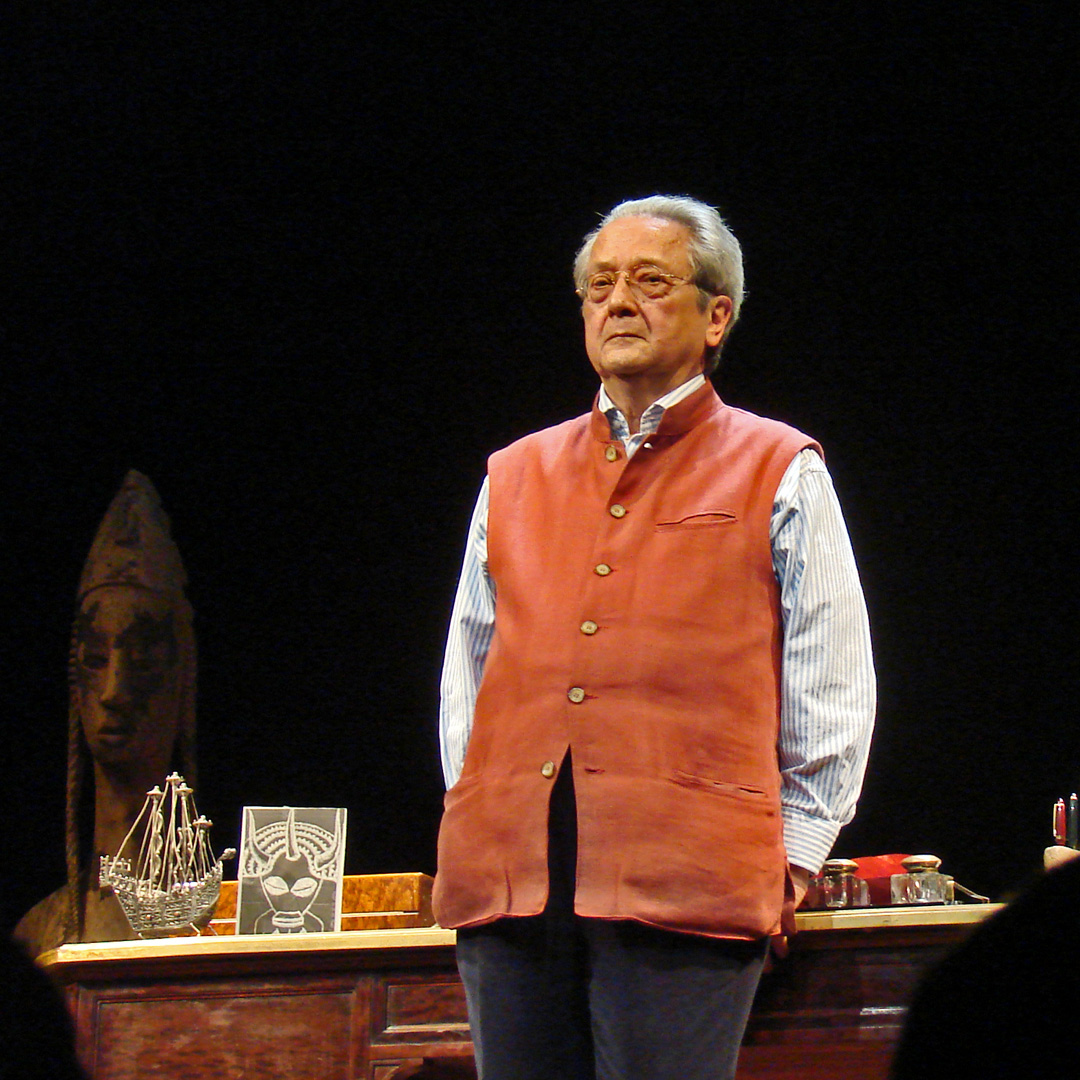
Jacques Vergès at théâtre de la Madeleine, in Paris, 2008.

From 24 February 1970 to 1978, Vergès disappeared from public view without explanation. He refused to comment about those years, remarking in an interview with Der Spiegel that "It's highly amusing that no one, in our modern police state, can figure out where I was for almost ten years." Vergès was last seen at an anti-colonial rally in Paris. He left his wife, Djamila Bouhired, and cut off all his ties with his friends and family. Many people wondered if he had been killed, kidnapped, become a spy, or had gone into hiding. His whereabouts during these years have remained a mystery. Many of his close associates of the time assume that he was in Cambodia with the Khmer Rouge, a rumour Pol Pot (Brother #1), Nuon Chea (Brother #2) and Ieng Sary (Brother #3) have denied. There are claims that Vergès was spotted in Paris by Mohamed Boudia, a contact from Algerian War and an old Communist associate, Jiří Pelikán. He is also alleged to have been in Switzerland at the house of François Genoud according to Ahmed Huber. He was also thought to be in several Arab countries in the company of Ali Hassan Salameh and Palestinian militant groups according to the Lebanese attorney Karim Pakradouni, and exiled Algerian politician Bachir Boumaza.

== High-profile defendants ==
After Vergès's return to public life he resumed his legal practice, taking on a variety of legal cases ranging from; Muslim children who wanted to wear headscarves in school, transfusion-transmitted HIV/AIDS patients contaminated by unscreened blood, prostitutes suing their pimps for back pay to defending high profile war criminals and dictators.

The first file that Jacques Vergès handled as a lawyer concerns Sonacotra. He engages in a "defence of rupture" (also called "strategy of rupture"), rather than what he calls the "defense of connivance", which was classically pleaded: the accused becomes the accuser, considers that the judge does not have jurisdiction or that the court does not have the legitimacy, and takes the opinion to witness.

=== Notable clients ===
Sources:

- National Liberation Front (Algeria)
- Red Army Faction
- Anis al-Naqqash
- Bernard Bonnet
- Bruno Bréguet
- Charles Sobhraj
- Félix Houphouët-Boigny
- Georges Ibrahim Abdallah
- Gnassingbé Eyadéma
- Idriss Déby
- Ilich Ramírez Sánchez, nom de guerre Carlos
- Klaus Croissant
- Magdalena Kopp
- Omar Bongo
- Omar Raddad
- The ex-captain Paul Barril the Élysée wiretapping affair
- Roger Garaudy
- Siné
- Slobodan Milosevic (legal council)
- Tariq Aziz

==== Klaus Barbie ====
The thrust of Vergès's defence in the case was that Barbie was being singled out for prosecution while the French state conveniently ignored other cases that qualified as crimes against humanity. Vergès adopted a tu quoque defense, asking the judges "is a crime against humanity to be defined as only one of Nazis against the Jews or if it applies to more serious crimes...the crimes of imperialists against people struggling for their independence?", going on to say there was nothing his client did against the Resistance that was not done by "certain French officers in Algeria" whom Vergès noted could not be prosecuted because of de Gaulle's amnesty of 1962. As such, Vergès argued that the republic had no right to convict Barbie of anything given that French officers like the war hero General Jacques Massu had also engaged in torture and extrajudicial executions during the fight against the FLN. Vergès argued in impassioned speeches before the court that the main conflict motivating history was the struggle between the Global North and the Global South, and that American policy in the Vietnam war and French policy during the Algerian war were the "true face" of the West. Vergès maintained that to convict Barbie was a base act of hypocrisy for a French court as his actions were those of a typical Westerner, and therefore he could not be punished for doing merely what other Westerners had done.

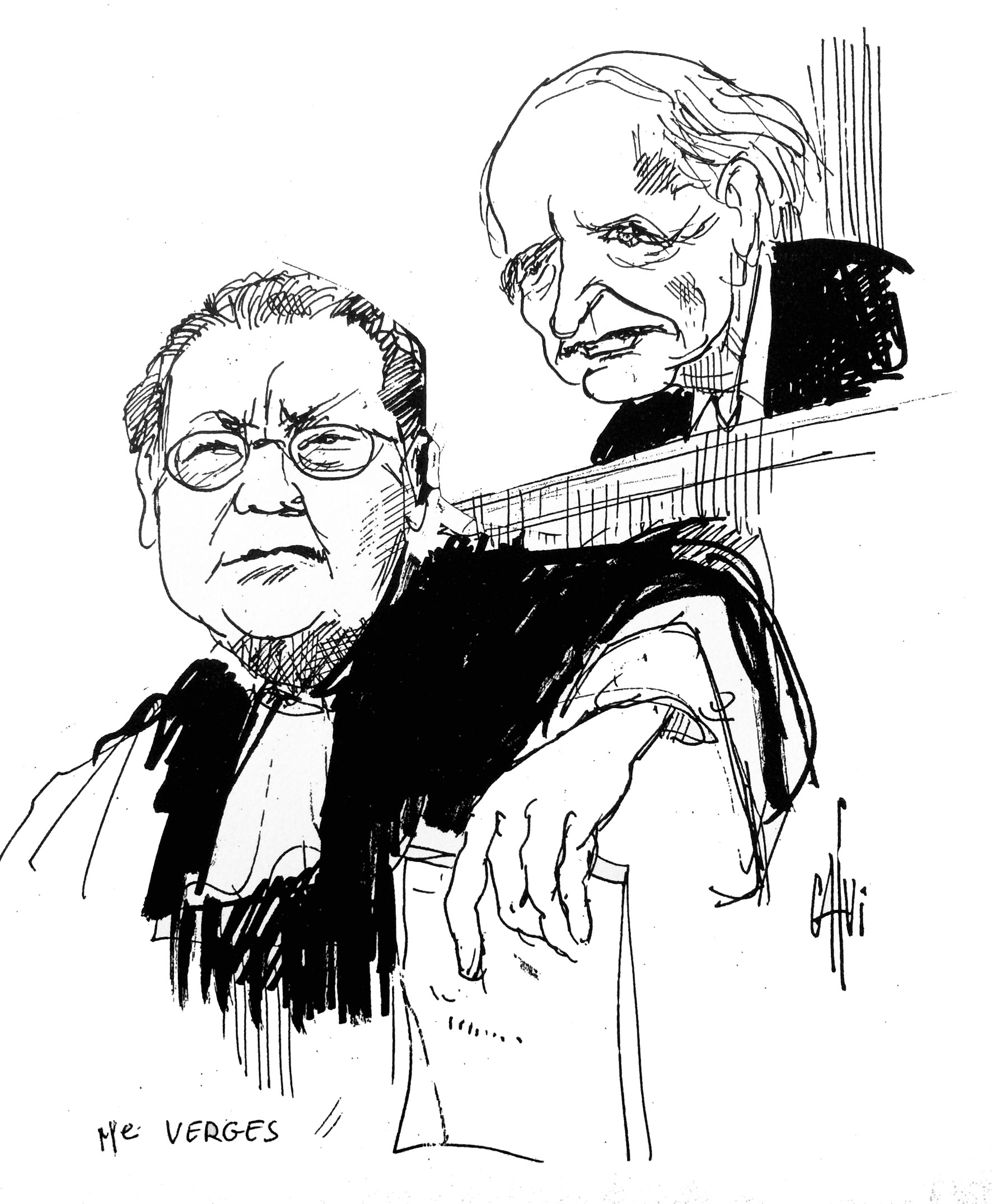
Caricature of Vergès and Klaus Barbie during the trial, by Calvi

Besides his tu quoque defense of arguing that French actions in the Algerian War were no different from Barbie's, Vergès spent much time attempting to prove the Resistance hero Jean Moulin had been betrayed by either the Communists, the Gaullists, or both, which led him to argue Barbie was less culpable than those who had betrayed Moulin. Vergès claimed Moulin's colleagues were "playing a double game" and all those in the Resistance "whether they were anti-Gaullists or anti-Communists forgot their duty to the Resistance because of partisan political passions". At one point, Vergès claimed that Moulin had actually wanted to be tortured to death and tipped off Barbie himself. Under French law, defense lawyers are entitled to use competing theories in defense of their clients, unlike the prosecution who must stick to only one line of argument. Barbie was not on trial for the torture and murder of Moulin as the statute of limitations in the Moulin case had expired, but instead on trial for crimes against humanity for his role in deporting Jews from Lyons in 1942-44, for which there was no statute of limitations, and for his role in the arrest and deportation of 44 Jewish children from the Izieu orphanage on 6 April 1944. Of the 44 children, 42 were killed at Auschwitz.

Vergès seems to have brought in the Moulin case as part of his defense of Barbie as a strategy of drawing attention from the actions that Barbie had actually been put on trial for. Despite Vergès's efforts, the court found Barbie guilty of crimes against humanity, sentencing him to life imprisonment. Reviewing the film Hôtel Terminus: The Life and Times of Klaus Barbie, the film critic David Denby wrote the climax of the film was when the French filmmaker Marcel Ophüls pressed the "despicable" Vergès during an interview about his defense of Barbie, whom Denby wrote "...persists in pretending that Barbie is a victim of some sort". Vergès was paid to defend Barbie by Swiss Nazi financier François Genoud, whom Vergès had met during the Algerian War due to their mutual support for the FLN.

==== Lawsuits against Amnesty International and François-Xavier Verschave ====
In 1999 Vergès sued Amnesty International on behalf of the government of Togo. In 2001, on behalf of Idriss Déby, president of Chad, Omar Bongo, president of Gabon, and Denis Sassou-Nguesso, President of the Republic of the Congo, he sued François-Xavier Verschave for his book Noir silence denouncing the crimes of the Françafrique on the charges of "offense toward a foreign state leader", using an arcane 1881 law. The attorney general observed how this crime recalled the lese majesty crime; the court thus deemed it contrary to the European Convention on Human Rights, thus leading to Verschave's acquittal.

==== Khieu Samphan ====
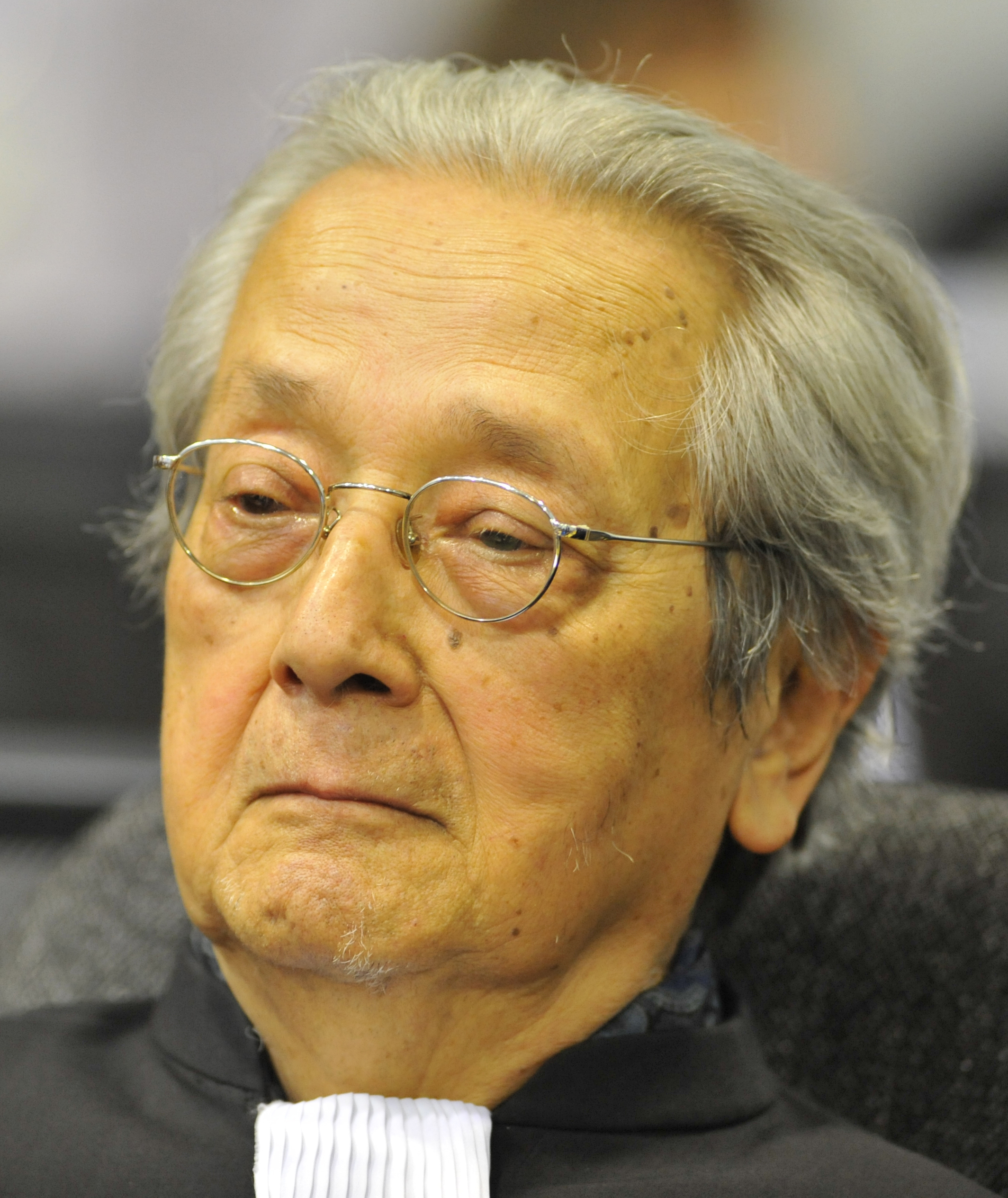
Vergès on the first day of opening statements for the Samphan trial in 2011

In April 2008, former Khmer Rouge head of state Khieu Samphan, and old associate of Vergès, made his first appearance at Cambodia's genocide tribunal. Vergès represented Samphan, using the defence that, while Samphan has never denied that many people in Cambodia were killed, as head of state he was not directly responsible.

==== Saddam Hussein ====
After the US-led coalition forces invaded Iraq in March 2003 and deposed Saddam Hussein, many former leaders in the Baathist regime were arrested. In late 2003, Vergès offered to defend Hussein after he was approached by Saddam's nephew who was putting a legal team together. However, the Hussein family opted not to use Vergès.

In May 2008, Tariq Aziz assembled a team that included Vergès as well as a French-Lebanese and four Italian lawyers.

== Personal life ==
Jacques Vergès was married twice. He had a son with his first wife, Karine. He would go on to marry his client Djamila Bouhired, having two children with her.

According to The Economist, "history was his first love, and he still sometimes dreamed of deciphering Etruscan or Linear A, unfolding the secrets of mysterious civilizations."

In 2002, he called former Serbian leader Slobodan Milošević "extremely likeable". In January 2008, he personally supported Tomislav Nikolić, nationalist leader of the Serbian Radical Party.

== Death ==
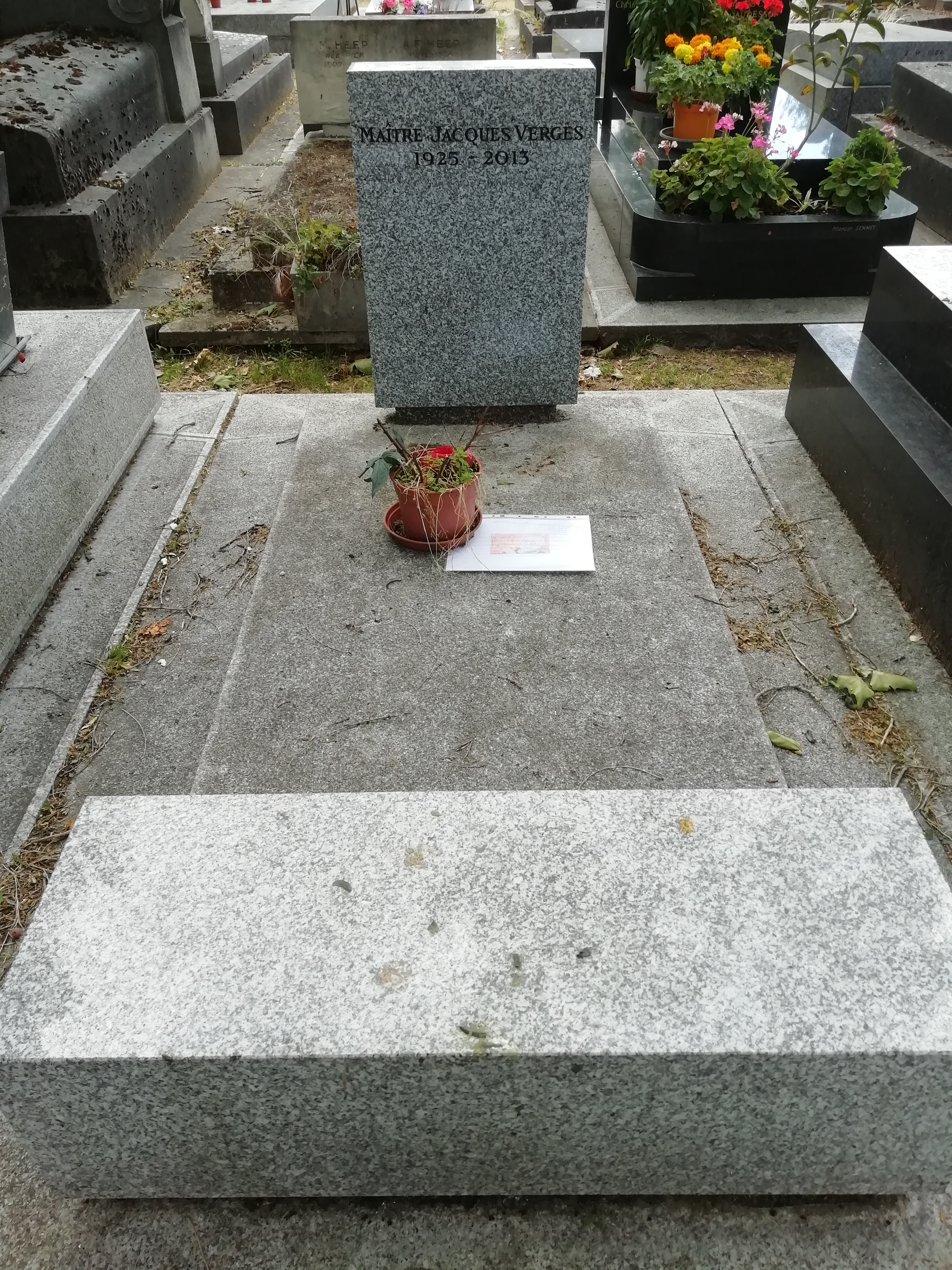
Tomb of Jacques Vergès at the cemetery of Montparnasse

Jacques Vergès died on 15 August 2013 of a heart attack in Paris at the age of 88. His funeral was attended by Roland Dumas and Dieudonné. Vergès is buried in the Montparnasse Cemetery.

== In popular culture ==
- In 1987 Vergès appeared on an episode of the live British discussion television programme After Dark alongside, among others, Eli Rosenbaum, Neal Ascherson, Philippe Daudy and Paul Oestreicher.
- Vergès was interviewed in the documentary Hotel Terminus: The Life and Times of Klaus Barbie, directed by Marcel Ophuls.
- Vergès was portrayed by Nicolas Briançon in the 2010 French film Carlos.

== Bibliography ==
=== Books written by Vergès (English language) ===
Note: Few works by Vergès have been translated into English.

- Mervyn Jones, Ordeal : The Trial of Djamila Bouhired, Condemned to Death, Algiers, July 15th, 1957, London, Union of Democratic Control Publications, c. 1958, 1979. "With the complete text of the speech for the defence, by Jacques Vergès."

=== Books written by Vergès (French language) ===
- Pour Djamila Bouhired, with Georges Arnaud, Éditions de Minuit, 1957.
- Le droit et la colère, with Michel Zavrian & Maurice Courrégé, Éditions de Minuit, Paris, coll. « Documents », 1960.
- Le crime de colonialisme. Colloque de Rome, 2, 3, 4, février 1962, in Revue Les Temps modernes (N°190), Gallimard, Paris, March 1962.
- De la stratégie judiciaire, Éditions de Minuit, Paris, coll. « Documents », 1968.
- Pour les fidayine. La résistance palestinienne, Éditions de Minuit, Paris, coll. « Documents », Paris, 1969.
- Agenda, Paris, Simoen, 1979
- Pour en finir avec Ponce Pilate, Le Pré aux clercs, 1983
- La Face cachée du procès Barbie. Compte-rendu des débats de Ligoure (with Étienne Bloch), S. Tastet, coll. « Formule rompue », 1983
- Beauté du crime, Plon, Paris 1988
- Je défends Barbie (preface by Jean-Edern Hallier), Jean Picollec, Paris, coll. « Documents dossiers », 1988
- Le Salaud lumineux, Michel Lafon, 1 January 1990
- La Justice est un jeu, Éditions Albin Michel, 1992
- Lettre ouverte à des amis algériens devenus tortionnaires, Éditions Albin Michel, coll. « Lettre ouverte », 1993
- Mon Dieu pardonnez-leur, Michel Lafon, 1995
- Intelligence avec l'ennemi, Michel Lafon, 1996
- J'ai plus de souvenirs que si j'avais mille ans, Éditions 84, 1999
- Nocturne. Poésie, Éditions Olbia, 2001 (ISBN 978-2719105368)
- Avocat du diable, avocat de Dieu (entretiens avec Alain de La Morandais), Paris : Presses de la Renaissance, 2000 (ISBN 978-2-85616787-8)
- Un procès de la barbarie à Brazzaville (co-author Dior Diagne), Jean Picollec, 2000
- Noir silence, blancs mensonges, Jean Picollec, Paris, 2001
- Les Sanguinaires : sept affaires célèbres, J'ai lu, 2001
- Omar m'a tuer – histoire d'un crime, J'ai lu, 2001
- L'Apartheid judiciaire, with Pierre Marie Gallois, L'Âge d'homme, Lausanne 2002
- Le Suicide de la France, Olbia, 2002
- Dictionnaire amoureux de la justice, Plon, coll. « Dictionnaire amoureux », 2002
- Les Erreurs judiciaires, Presses universitaires de France – PUF, coll. « Que sais-je ? », 2002
- Justice pour le peuple serbe, L'Âge d'Homme, coll. « Collection Objections », 2003
- La Démocratie à visage obscène : le vrai catéchisme de George W. Bush, La Table ronde, 2004
- Les Crimes d'État et comédie judiciaire, Plon, 2004
- Passent les jours et passent les semaines : Journal de l'année 2003-2004, Plon, 2005
- Jacques Vergès, l'anticolonialiste (conversations with Philippe Karim Felissi), Paris : le Félin, coll. « Histoire et sociétés », 2005 (ISBN 2-86645-584-3)
- Malheur aux pauvres, Plon, 2006 (ISBN 978-2259199223)
- Crimes contre l'humanité massacres en Côte d'Ivoire, Pharos, 276 p., avril 2006
- Que mes guerres étaient belles !, Éditions du Rocher, 2007 (ISBN 978-2268060989)
- Journal : La passion de défendre, Éditions du Rocher, 2008 (ISBN 978-2268065069)
- Justice et littérature, Presses universitaires de France, coll. « Questions judiciaires », 2011 (ISBN 978-2130575382)
- « Crimes et fraudes » en Côte d'Ivoire, Édite, 2011 (ISBN 978-2-84608-306-5)
- Sarkozy sous BHL (with Roland Dumas), Éditions Pierre-Guillaume de Roux, 2011, 128 p.
- De mon propre aveu, Éditions Pierre-Guillaume de Roux, 2013 (ISBN 978-2-36371-053-6)

=== Books and theses about Jacques Vergès (English language) ===
- Jonathan Widell, Jacques Vergès, devil's advocate: a psychohistory of Vergès' judicial strategy, Doctor of Civil Law thesis, McGill University, 2012

=== Books and theses about Jacques Vergès (French language) ===
- Emmanuelle Bosc, Jacques Vergès: la plaidoirie de l'indéfendable par la dénonciation de l'inavouable, sn, 1992
- Robert Charvin, Jacques Vergès : un aristocrate de refus, Paris: Editions L'Harmattan, 2013
- François Dessy, Jacques Vergès, l'ultime plaidoyer : conversations entre confrères avec maître François Dessy, Editions de l'Aube, 2014
- Véronique Martin, Jacques Vergès envers et contre tous, Paris: Editions de Verneuil, 1999
- Bernard Violet and Robert Jégaden, Vergès: le maître de l'ombre, Paris: Seuil, 2000

== Filmography ==
- L'Avocat de la terreur (Terror's Advocate), a 2007 documentary about Vergès, directed and narrated by Barbet Schroeder.
- Nigel Kendall, Terror's Advocate, The Times, 13 September 2008
- Jamie Kessler, Films in Brief: Terror's Advocate, Columbia Political Review, 2 December 2007

== See also ==
- List of solved missing person cases: 1950–1999
