= Dreamer of the Day =

1999 book by Kevin Coogan

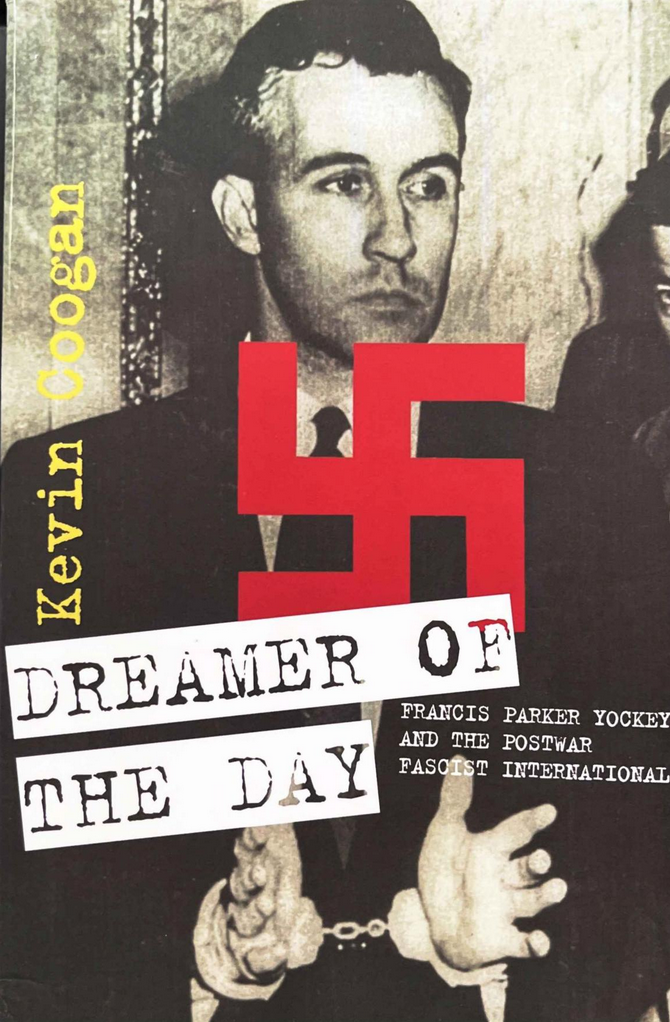
- Cover of the first edition
- Author: Kevin Coogan
- Language: English
- Subject: Francis Parker Yockey
- Publisher: Autonomedia
- Publication date: 1999
- Publication place: United States
- Media type: Print (paperback)
- Pages: 644
- ISBN: 1-57027-039-2
- OCLC: 38884251
- Dewey Decimal: 320.533092
- LC Class: HN90.R3 Y633 1999

Dreamer of the Day: Francis Parker Yockey and the Postwar Fascist International is a biography of Francis Parker Yockey and an exploration of postwar international fascism by American journalist Kevin Coogan. Coogan worked on the book for over ten years. The book was first published by the radical publisher Autonomedia in 1999. Dreamer of the Day was the only book of Coogan's published while he was alive. The foreword was written by esotericism scholar Nicholas Goodrick-Clarke.

Yockey was an American fascist and the author of the book Imperium; a little-known figure in his time, his influence grew after his death when Willis Carto republished Imperium. During his life, he was extremely mysterious and used a variety of false names; his background was ill-known and shrouded in rumor. Coogan profiles him, traces his actual life and origins, and connects him to a variety of other fascist figures internationally. His legacy and influence due to Carto's promotion of Imperium are also considered.

Dreamer of the Day received little public attention or acceptance from scholars upon release. However, what reception it did receive was highly positive, particularly for the detail and reconstruction of Yockey's background and the focus on a man who had seen little prior scholarly attention. In the years since its publication, several scholars have described it as the definitive and most comprehensive biography of Yockey.

== Background and publication history ==
Kevin Coogan was an American journalist. He wrote several documents on the Lyndon LaRouche network and studied third positionists; he also wrote for the music magazine Hit List. Coogan spent 10 years working on Dreamer of the Day. Dreamer of the Day was the only book of Coogan's published while he was alive. He wrote another manuscript entitled Red Swastika about the Russian political activist Aleksandr Dugin but never published it.

The book was published in 1999 by the publisher Autonomedia, a self-described "autonomous zone for arts radicals in both old and new media". The first edition had 644 pages and was published in paperback format.

== Contents ==
The book's title comes from a quote by T. E. Lawrence:

All men dream: but not equally. Those who dream by night in the dusty recesses of their minds wake in the day to find that it was vanity: but the dreamers of the day are dangerous men, for they may act their dream with open eyes, to make it possible.

— T. E. Lawrence, Seven Pillars of Wisdom

The book profiles the American fascist writer Francis Parker Yockey (1917–1960), most well-known for being the author of the book Imperium. While Dreamer of the Day centers around Yockey, it explores his connections with a number of other fascist figures and goes in many other directions, described by Coogan as a "labyrinth-like history of postwar fascism". The book is divided into 12 sections and a conclusion, with 56 chapters.

The foreword, written by esotericism scholar Nicholas Goodrick-Clarke, gives a brief overview of Yockey and the book. The introduction begins with Yockey's arrest on June 6, 1960, which ended a multi-year-long FBI manhunt for him; less than two weeks later, he killed himself in prison via cyanide poisoning. Following his death, his book was republished by Willis Carto in the United States which spread it to a new audience, increasing his influence posthumously. The book's first section begins with Yockey's imprisonment and suicide, then retreats to his childhood and tries to reconstruct his life chronologically from there. During his life, he was extremely mysterious and used a variety of false names; his background was ill-known and shrouded in rumor.

Coogan attempts to rectify this and trace his true origins. Yockey was an obscure writer in his time. He was not popular among most fascists of the day, who did not understand what he was trying to accomplish. Other fascists sometimes ridiculed him, and he was criticized by neo-Nazi George Lincoln Rockwell as a Strasserist and heretic, though some, like James H. Madole, were more sympathetic and influenced by Yockey. Coogan also connects Yockey to and describes a variety of other fascist figures, among them Johann von Leers, a Nazi who fled to Argentina following World War II, then moved to Egypt, converted to Islam, and spent the rest of his life propagandizing for the Nasser regime. Also discussed are Otto Skorzeny and his Paladin Group. Carto's promotion of Yockey and his works, and his resulting legacy, are also discussed. Coogan argues that had Carto not done this, Yockey would have likely been entirely forgotten. Coogan builds off the work of Keith Stimely, a devoted Yockeyite who himself had aimed to write a book on Yockey, and had exchanged letters with many of Yockey's associates, but died before he began writing it.

In the conclusion "Labyrinth's End", Coogan argues that "Nazism and communism may perhaps one day be seen as 20th-century examples of a long line of European-centered millenarian movements", both "seem[ing] exhausted given the triumph of multinational capitalism", but that "periods of ideological decay often breed strange new variants". He argues that by studying the past, one becomes more conscious of their status as a historical actor, "to enter more fully into the great dialogue between the world of Becoming and the world of Being, between the fleeting kingdom of the living and the western land to which we are all headed, the empire of our ancestors, the vast Imperium of the dead."

Following the main contents of the book, there are several appendixes labeled A to I, which cover briefly several more tangential topics, like Miguel Serrano's Nos, secret societies, François Genoud, and Lee Harvey Oswald's address book, among other topics.

== Reception ==
Initially, the book received comparatively little attention or acceptance from other scholars; according to Coogan's associates, this came as a disappointment. Despite this, what little academic reception it did receive was positive. Several scholars described it as the definitive or authoritative study of Yockey and his life. Scholar George Michael described it as the most comprehensive study of Yockey. Anthony Mostrom, a reviewer for the Los Angeles Review of Books, retrospectively called it "excellent" in 2020, while scholar Spencer Sunshine called it Coogan's "opus".

Jerome Edwards for Terrorism and Political Violence called it "an interesting attempt to fill in the details" of a life that was very poorly documented. He complimented Coogan as a "remarkable researcher" and his arguments as sound, with a good grasp of historical perspective. Richard Morrock for The Journal of Psychohistory said it was a "thoroughly researched and disturbing" book, praising it for its coverage of someone who had then received little scholarly attention. However, Edwards criticized its organization, coherence, and negatively compared it against the book American Fuehrer, written by Frederick J. Simonelli, another book published the same year about a racist ideologue, in this case George Lincoln Rockwell. Edwards said Dreamer of the Day was at times very tangential, to the point where the main subject was perhaps not even Yockey, as evidenced by the fact that the book "discusses in detail not only his machinations, but also all the machinations of everyone involved with his machinations".

Scholar of fascism Roger Griffin praised the book. He called it "essential" and "a brilliant study of the shadowy, phantasmagorical world of the postwar neo-fascism". He complimented it as "an impressively researched exploration of just one 'story' in the internationalization of post-war fascism, its extraordinary ideological diversity and earnestness, and the bizarre fantasy world which some fascists still inhabit while they wait for the 'interregnum' to close." Political scientist A. James Gregor, critical of the idea of "neo-fascism" itself, nevertheless noted the book as "one of the better accounts of all the 'neofascists' discovered by connecting them through the most transient of connections". Political science professor George Hawley recommended it as an introduction to Yockey.

It received some amount of praise from far-right figures; far-right publisher John Morgan of Arktos Media said in a conversation with Arthur Versluis that despite the author's "baseless accusations", the book was "impressive for its breadth and detail". Paleoconservative writer Paul Gottfried wrote a review of it for the magazine Chronicles, saying that Coogan's portrait of Yockey showed him to be "an emotionally distraught loner with a morbid attraction to Hitler" that "combined anti-egalitarian and anti-materialist opinions with a favorable view of the Soviet Union". Marxist writer Loren Goldner also praised it in the magazine Race Traitor and the French newspaper Le Monde diplomatique. Goldner called the book "excellent" and "essential" for understanding postwar fascism, particularly for its "painstaking reconstruction" of Yockey's life, as well as "the post-1945 international fascist regroupment".
