= Revolutionary Islam =

Book by llich Ramírez Sánchez

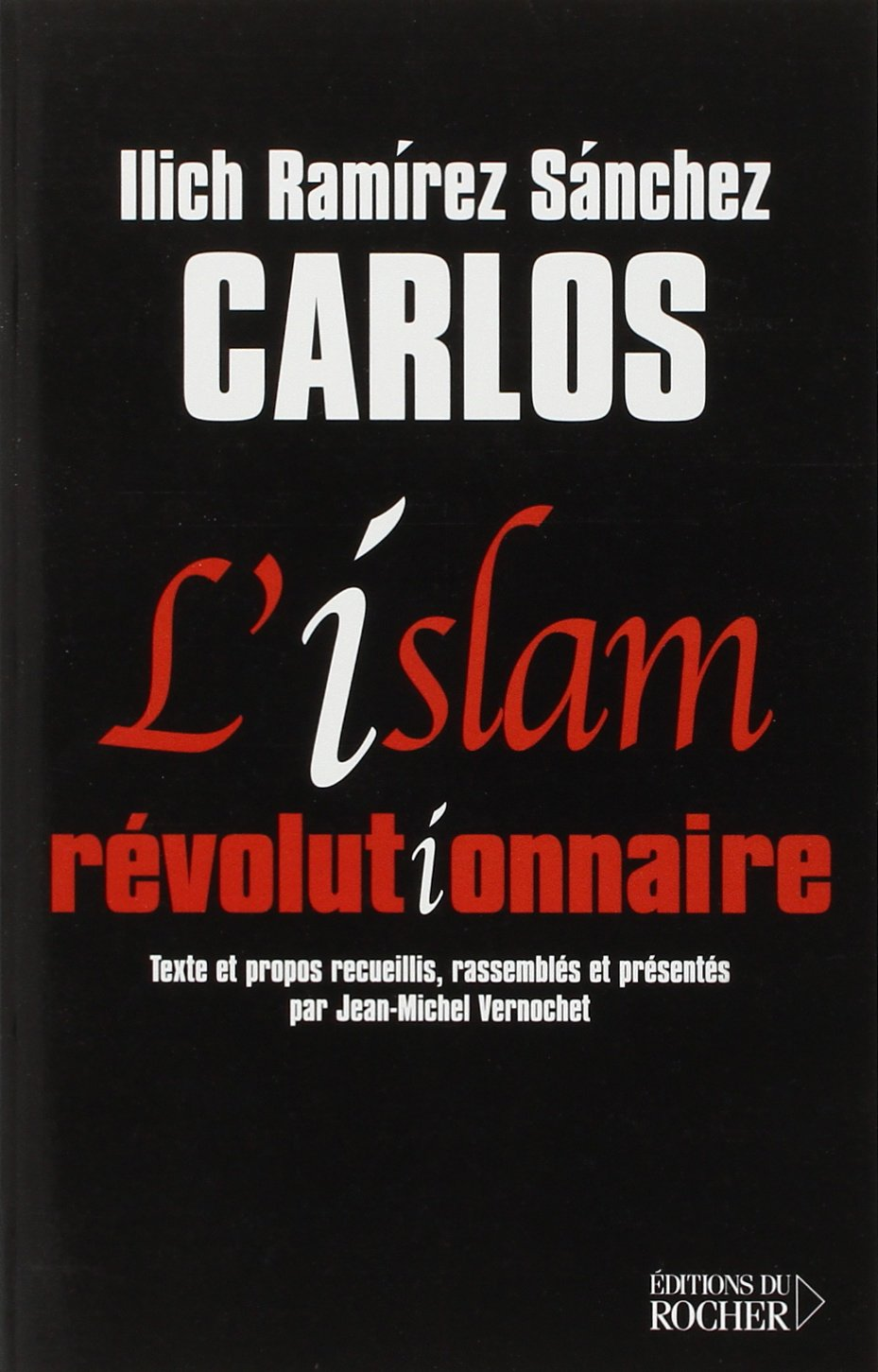
- Author: Ilich Ramírez Sánchez
- Language: French
- Subject: Islamic terrorism
- Published: June 26, 2003
- Publisher: Éditions du Rocher
- Publication place: France
- Pages: 273
- ISBN: 978-2-268-04433-0

Revolutionary Islam (French L'islam révolutionnaire, ISBN 978-2-268-04433-0) is a book written by international revolutionary Ilich Ramírez Sánchez, also known as Carlos the Jackal, under the direction of Jean-Michel Vernochet. It was published in 2003 by the Éditions du Rocher.
