= Neville Atkinson =

British aviator (1933–2007)

Neville Clive Atkinson
- Born: 7 July 1933; Beverley, East Riding of Yorkshire
- Died: 13 January 2007 (aged 73); Fochabers, Moray, Scotland
- Military career
- Allegiance: United Kingdom
- Branch: Royal Navy; Fleet Air Arm
- Service years: 1952 – 1972
- Unit: HMS Centaur

Neville Clive Atkinson (7 July 1933 – 13 January 2007) was a British aviator who served as personal pilot to Libyan President Muammar Gaddafi during the 1970s.

Atkinson was born in Beverley in the East Riding of Yorkshire, and served in the Fleet Air Arm of the Royal Navy. He served aboard HMS Centaur and piloted Sea Vixen FAW2 fighters. In 1972 Atkinson left the Navy to take up the position as personal pilot to Muammar Gaddafi. For the next 10 years his role was to fly Gaddafi, government ministers and various world dignitaries around the Middle East and Africa.

A notable moment in Atkinson's career was in December 1975, when he was given the task of flying Carlos the Jackal and a number of other terrorists. He extracted Carlos and his fellow terrorists from Algeria, saving the lives of sixty people who had been taken hostage in the raid on OPEC headquarters in Vienna. It is reputed that Neville asked Carlos to sign a copy of Frederick Forsyth's novel Day of the Jackal during the flight.

In 2006 Atkinson published a book Death on Small Wings: Memoirs of a Presidential Pilot which detailed his experiences.

He died on 13 January 2007, aged 73.

== See also ==
- Muammar Gaddafi
- Carlos the Jackal

== Bibliography ==
- Atkinson, Neville. Death on Small Wings: Memoirs of a Presidential Pilot. Libario Publishing Ltd. 2006. ISBN 1-904440-78-9
