= Isabelle Coutant-Peyre =

French lawyer (1953–2024)

- Born: 5 July 1953
- Died: 12 April 2024 (aged 70)
- Citizenship: France
- Occupation: Lawyer
- Partner: Ilich Ramírez Sánchez
- Children: 3

Isabelle Coutant-Peyre (5 July 1953 – 12 April 2024) was a French lawyer who was engaged to Ilich Ramírez Sánchez, the international terrorist better known as "Carlos the Jackal".

== Life and career ==
Coutant-Peyre represented Zacarias Moussaoui early on during his imprisonment, while he was awaiting trial for his role in the terrorist attacks of 11 September 2001.

Married to a civil servant, she had three sons; Florent, Gabriel and Aurélien. She became a lawyer and worked with Jacques Vergès, defender of Djamila Bouhired and she supported her defence of "revolutionary fighters" with income from her activities as a business lawyer.

In her political cases, she employed "rupture" techniques. She was briefly jailed for likening French police to the Gestapo.

Her former fiancé, Ilich Ramírez Sánchez, known as "Carlos the Jackal", is held at Clairvaux Prison, part of the general inmate population, and their attempts to marry were frustrated by legal issues. Conjugal visits can only be made after a civil marriage occurs; a Muslim ceremony performed in 2001, when Carlos was married to his second wife and Isabelle was married to her first husband, reportedly had no legal force.

Her clients included Stellio Capo Chichi, Youssouf Fofana (murderer of Ilan Halimi), Roger Garaudy, Mohamed Benalel Merah (father of Mohammed Merah responsible for the Toulouse and Montauban shootings), Charles Sobhraj, and the Islamic Republic of Iran against the film Argo.

== Death ==
Coutant-Peyre died on 12 April 2024, at the age of 70.

== Bibliography ==
- "Grand témoin : Isabelle Coutant-Peyre", in Hallier Edernellement vôtre, Jean-Pierre Thiollet, Neva Editions, 2019, p. 173–188. ISBN 978-2-35055-273-6
- "In memoriam : Isabelle Coutant-Peyre", in Hallier, chagrins d'amour, Jean-Pierre Thiollet, Neva Editions, 2024, p. 221–225. ISBN 978-2-35055-313-9
