= François Genoud =

Swiss Nazi collaborator (1915–1996)

- Born: 26 October 1915; Lausanne, Switzerland
- Died: 30 May 1996 (aged 80); Lausanne, Switzerland
- Cause of death: Suicide by poison
- Political party: National Front
- Movement: Nazism, anti-Zionism, Arab nationalism

François Genoud (26 October 1915 – 30 May 1996) was a noted Swiss financier, Nazi sympathizer, and supporter of Middle Eastern militant groups during the post-World War II 20th century.

In 1992, Genoud told a London newspaper "My views have not changed since I was a young man. Hitler was a great leader, and if he had won the war, the world would be a better place today."

His friends included militant Carlos the Jackal, one-time Gestapo agent and Interpol head Paul Dickopf, SS general Karl Wolff, Nazi Economy Minister Hjalmar Schacht and the Grand Mufti of Jerusalem Haj Amin al-Husseini.

== Early life ==
Genoud was from Lausanne, Switzerland. He met Adolf Hitler in 1932 as a teenager in a hotel while studying in Bonn. He joined the pro-Nazi National Front in 1934, and two years later he travelled to Palestine where he met the Grand Mufti of Jerusalem, Amin el-Husseini. Working for both Swiss and German intelligence agencies, Genoud travelled extensively in the Middle East.

== World War II ==
Genoud travelled to Berlin frequently during the war "to see his friend the Grand Mufti," and visited him afterward many times in Beirut. The Grand Mufti allegedly "entrusted Genoud with the management of his enormous financial affairs".

In 1940, together with a Lebanese national, he set up the Oasis nightclub in Lausanne to serve as a covert operation for the Abwehr. In 1941, Abwehr agent Paul Dickopf sent Genoud into Germany, Czechoslovakia, Hungary and Belgium. Genoud befriended several top Nazis, including Karl Wolff, "supreme SS and police leader" in Italy. At the end of the war, Genoud represented the Swiss Red Cross in Brussels.

== Post-war ==
Genoud is notable for having been the executor of the last will and testament of Nazi propagandist Joseph Goebbels, and for reportedly making a fortune from publishing Goebbels' diaries, which he held the posthumous rights for along with Hitler and Martin Bormann's works. This enterprise suffered a setback in 1960 when Paula Hitler died without his securing the full rights to the literary works of Adolf Hitler.

Nazi hunters such as Serge Klarsfeld and Simon Wiesenthal, journalist David Lee Preston, and others have asserted that his role as a benefactor for surviving National Socialist interests goes much deeper, offering evidence that Genoud was no less than the principal financial manager of the hidden Swiss assets of the Third Reich after World War II.

In 1986 American journalists Martin A. Lee and Kevin Coogan met with Genoud and interviewed him in Lausanne in 1986. Genoud only agreed to meet with Coogan and Lee with the condition that the interview not be taped and he not be directly quoted. The article came out in Mother Jones in May 1987, the only American journalistic investigation into Genoud while he was alive.

=== Friendship with Paul Dickopf ===
That Paul Dickopf became Interpol Head is connected with his friendship with Francois Genoud, because Genoud lobbied Arab governments to help him achieve the role. The implications are understood to include that when the Munich massacre occurred in 1972, Interpol limited its investigation into it, with a spokesman from Interpol stating that, "Interpol was an agency designed to handle criminal, not political matters."

== Arab nationalism ==
Genoud became a passionate supporter of Arab nationalist causes, funding many nationalist and right-wing organisations. When creating "Hitlers politisches Testament" (a forgery), he likely attributed pro-Arab statements to Hitler in order to fit his agenda of support for Arab Terrorism. (He was also heavily involved with Hitler’s Table Talk, possessing most of the revised Bormann notes in question.)

=== Algerian Liberation Front ===
While in Egypt in the 1950s, through contacts in Gamal Abdel Nasser's government, he was introduced to the leaders of the Algerian Liberation Front, which he would eventually finance by 1954 after originally supplying weapons. In 1958, he founded the Arab Commercial Bank in Geneva, which would be active in lending to Arab nationalist groups and as the chief repository for the Algerian National Liberation Front.

=== Palestine ===
In the 1960s, Genoud began supplying arms for Palestinian causes. The Lausanne-based New European Order organisation, met in Barcelona in April 1969, where Palestinian groups received financial support and Genoud placed them in contact with former Nazis who would assist their military training, including pledged support designated for the Palestine Liberation Organisation. He was a close associate of Dr. George Habash and Jacques Vergès, and in September 1969, he contributed finances for the legal expenses of three Palestinians from the Popular Front for the Liberation of Palestine following their attack on an El Al flight in Zurich, where he personally sat at their defense table.

== Notable aid recipients and associations ==
Genoud was a close friend of Otto Skorzeny, Karl Wolff, and Klaus Barbie during the years of the Third Reich.

Genoud financed several legal defences, including Adolf Eichmann and Klaus Barbie. He financed the defense of Bruno Bréguet during the 1970s after a bombing mission in Israel in 1970. The PFLP called for the release of both Bréguet and Leila Khaled, part of the Che Guevara Commando Unit of the Popular Front for the Liberation of Palestine, together in 1970. Genoud helped Ilich Ramírez Sánchez in 1994, after playing a key role in the success of his missions in the previous decades.

He was closely associated with Ali Hassan Salameh, providing him medical care, and he also bankrolled Ayatollah Khomeini's exile in France when Iran was governed by Shah Mohammed Reza Pahlavi. He was a mentor of Ahmed Huber.

Among the people with whom he came into contact was the Sephardic Italian-Egyptian Communist Henri Curiel. It is unclear whether there was any financial relationship between them, although they shared an interest in the Algerian cause.

Throughout the 1970s, Genoud financed many left-wing groups with the goal of supporting Arab nationalist causes. It is alleged that he delivered the ransom demand after the Lufthansa Flight 649 hijacking in 1972.

== Legal troubles ==
Genoud found himself in legal troubles from time to time, such as in 1983, when he was represented by Baudoin Dunant, a leading Geneva-based lawyer who sits on the board of over 20 companies, including the Saudi Investment Company, the overseas arm of the Saudi Binladin Group.

In 1993, a bomb exploded outside his home and by 1996 Swiss authorities were still investigating him for his financial activities during the Third Reich.

== Death ==
Genoud committed suicide, with, according to his family, the help of the Swiss pro-euthanasia group Exit, at age 80 on 30 May 1996. He explained his decision to the group by stating that a "psychological illness" had made it impossible for him to endure life since the death of his second spouse, Elisabeth, in 1991. It has been speculated that he was also motivated by the desire to escape a forthcoming investigation of Swiss-Nazi financial contacts or simply by his declining health, as he was unlikely to live long in any case.

== In popular culture ==
In the miniseries Carlos, Genoud is mentioned by Ilich Ramírez Sánchez's character portrayed by Édgar Ramírez. The production has been criticized for downplaying the historical role of Genoud with Sánchez.

== See also ==
- Ahmed Huber
- Johann von Leers
