= Mohamed Boudia =

Algerian political activist (1932–1973)

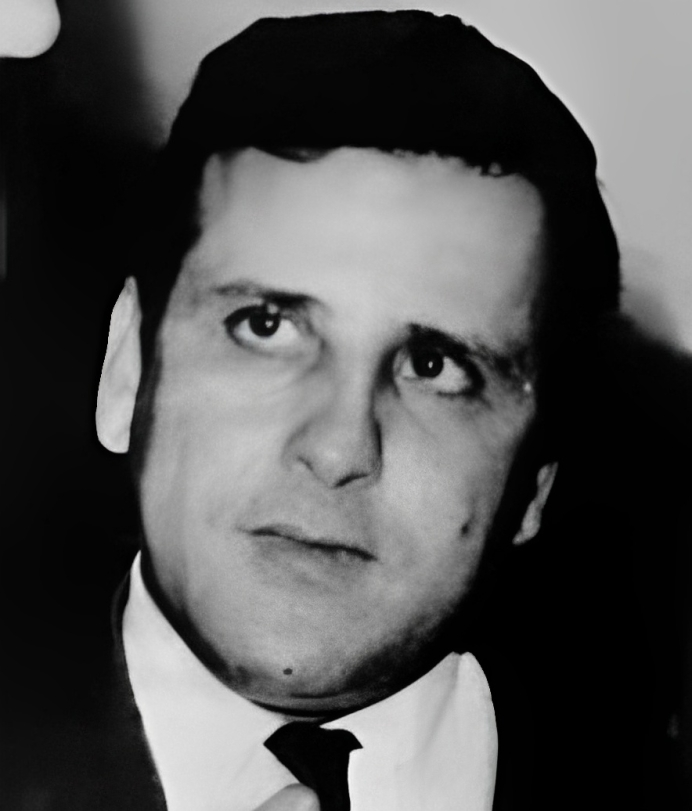

Chief of PFLP Operations in Europe
- Succeeded by: Michel Moukharbal

Personal details
- Born: 24 February 1932 French Algeria
- Died: 28 June 1973 (aged 41) Paris, France
- Cause of death: Assassination
- Party: Popular Front for the Liberation of Palestine (PFLP)
- Occupation: Poet, Playwright, Political Activist

Military service
- Branch/service: National Liberation Army
- Battles/wars: Algerian War

Mohamed Boudia (24 February 1932 – 28 June 1973) was an Algerian poet, revolutionary fighter, playwright, journalist and a senior member of the Popular Front for the Liberation of Palestine (PFLP). He was assassinated in Paris by a car bomb placed under his seat by Mossad agents as part of Mossad assassinations following the Munich massacre. At the time of his assassination, Boudia was the Chief of PFLP operations in Europe. Boudia was replaced by Michel Moukharbal.

Boudia had participated in the Algerian War, during which he was jailed for an attack on a petrol depot in southern France. The end of the war and Algerian independence in 1962 led to his release, after spending three years in prison. Boudia was a playwright, and after independence, he became the director of Algeria's national theatre. He fled to France after Houari Boumediène seized power in June 1965 and ran a theatre in Paris, whilst collaborating with figures such as Carlos the Jackal.
