= Bruno Bréguet =

Swiss militant

- Born: 29 May 1950; Muralto, Ticino, Switzerland
- Disappeared: 12 November 1995 (aged 45) on board the ferry Lato sailing from Italy to Greece
- Status: Missing for 30 years, 10 months and 16 days

Bruno Bréguet (born 29 May 1950) was a Swiss militant, known as the first European arrested and sentenced for pro-Palestinian militant activities. He was an associate of Ilich Ramírez Sánchez, better known as "Carlos the Jackal". He disappeared in 1995.

== Career ==
=== Israeli mission ===
In 1970 Bréguet, then 19 years old, traveled to Lebanon to join the Popular Front for the Liberation of Palestine (PFLP). A few weeks later, he was arrested on 23 June 1970 in Israel, while carrying two kilograms of explosives with the purpose of dynamiting harbour installations in Haifa. His friend François Genoud asked his son-in-law, lawyer Maurice Cruchon, to defend Bréguet.

Bréguet, who denied any ties with the PFLP, was sentenced in 1971 to 15 years imprisonment, but was pardoned in 1977 as a result of public advocacy by an international committee of supporters that included Jean-Paul Sartre, Simone de Beauvoir, Noam Chomsky and Alberto Moravia—as well as Genoud. He was expelled from Israel on 24 July 1977.

In the late 1970s, Bréguet may have established links with militants of Prima Linea. He wrote an account of his captivity in Israel that was published in 1980 in Milan under the title La scuola dell'odio (The School of Hate) (ISBN 978-8867180691).

=== Radio Free Europe bombing ===
Richard Cummings writes that Bréguet joined Carlos' group in 1980 and took part in its 1981 bombing of Radio Free Europe headquarters in Munich as his first operation. In August 1996 German prosecutors issued an arrest warrant for Bréguet in connection with that attack.

=== French missions ===
In February 1982 Bréguet and Carlos' wife Magdalena Kopp (fresh from a failed 18 January 1982 mission to destroy the Superphénix nuclear power plant in France) were arrested in an underground parking garage in Paris. They were carrying in the trunk of their vehicle two bottles of gas, two kilos of explosives linked to a timer set to go off at ten-thirty, and two grenades. During the arrest, Bréguet attempted to kill a policeman with a gun that misfired.

Bréguet and Kopp denied they were on a terrorist mission. François Genoud asked his friend, lawyer Jacques Vergès, to defend them in court. Carlos' organization also set off several bombs in retaliation for the arrest, and Carlos then wrote to French interior minister Gaston Defferre demanding their release within thirty days. When the letter was leaked to the press, the publicity ended in the pair getting lighter prison sentences with the attempted murder charge dropped.

It was later said that Bréguet and Kopp had been hired to bomb the Paris office of the magazine Al Watan al Arabi at 33 Rue Marbeuf, which was eventually hit on 22 April 1982.

Bréguet and Kopp were both paroled in 1985 and rejoined Carlos in Damascus, Syria. Later, Bréguet set down with family in Greece.

=== CIA agent ===
The Swiss historian Adrian Hänni showed in his 2023 book Terrorist und CIA Agent that Bréguet collaborated with the US Central Intelligence Agency (CIA) from at least 1991 onward. As a paid agent with the cryptonym FDBONUS/1, he provided the CIA with information on the Carlos group and spied on Greek left-wing terrorist organizations.

== Disappearance ==
Bréguet was last seen on 12 November 1995 on board the ferry Lato sailing from Italy to Greece. Searches by Greek police and Interpol revealed nothing. There are various theories and rumours regarding his disappearance. Some have speculated that he was killed by former associates, that he went into hiding because of evidence against him in recently released Stasi files, or that he cooperated with authorities and has since been living under a new identity.

His family has charged that he was kidnapped by the Greek or French secret service. It has been said in late 1996 that he may have been captured by the French DGSE to be confronted with witnesses and documents, concerning the implication of high regional officials of Nice in arms traffic to Algeria. Bréguet reportedly cooperated with French intelligence and justice.

Bréguet is also believed to have been murdered as a body who was found in Greece might have been his, but the authorities have not proved this be true.

In 2009, Carlos wrote to newly elected US President Barack Obama alleging that Bréguet had been kidnapped by "CIA agents backed by Nato naval commandos" and asking for information on his current whereabouts.

== See also ==
- List of people who disappeared mysteriously at sea

== Books ==
- (IT) Bruno Breguet, La scuola dell'odio. Sette anni nelle prigioni israeliane, Red star press 2015, ISBN 9788867180691

== Literature ==
- Adrian Hänni, Terrorist und CIA-Agent. Die unglaubliche Geschichte des Schweizers Bruno Breguet, NZZ Libro, Basel 2023, ISBN 978-3-907291-87-0

== Films ==
- Olmo Cerri, La scomparsa di Bruno Breguet (2024), Switzerland
