= Ahmed Huber =

Swiss-German journalist (1927–2008)

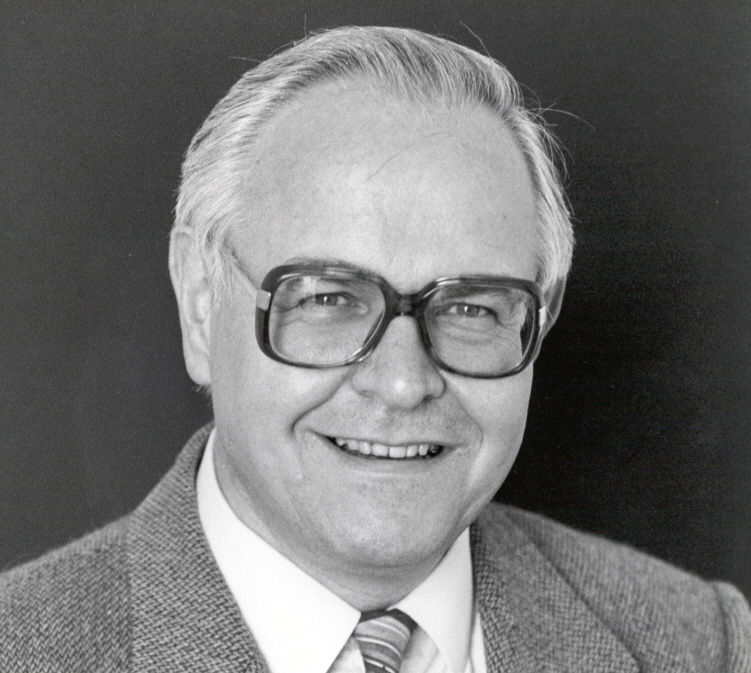
Huber in 1986

Ahmed Huber (25 March 1927 – 15 May 2008), born Albert Friedrich Armand Huber, was a Swiss-German journalist and convert to Islam, who was active in both Islamist and far-right politics, including with Neo-Nazism. He gained international notoriety in 2001, when he was accused by the United States government of funding Al Qaeda's terrorist activities through the Al Taqwa Bank of which he was one of five managers.

== Early life and education ==
Albert Friedrich Armand Huber was born in Fribourg, Switzerland, in 1927. Huber was raised in a staunchly Protestant family.

== Career ==
Huber was a member of the Swiss Socialist Party and strongly supported Algerian independence during the Algerian War. Whilst covering the conflict as a journalist, he opened contact with rebel groups. Through this connection, he became interested in Islam and embraced the religion. He recited his first public Shahada in Geneva's Islamic Centre before making a more public declaration at Al-Azhar University in February 1962.

Returning to Switzerland, he made contact with François Genoud, a rightist financier in anti-Israeli activities. Due to this association, Huber was expelled from the Socialist Party. He soon became involved in extreme right politics, spending much of his time in Germany, where he was close to the National Democratic Party of Germany and smaller neo-Nazi groups, regularly speaking at conferences and seminars. An outspoken admirer of Ayatollah Khomeini, he declared the Iranian leader to be the "living continuation of Adolf Hitler" as part of his attempts to link the European far right to radical Islamism.

Having forged links with the Muslim Brotherhood, Huber became involved in the management of the Al Taqwa Bank in Switzerland. In 2001, Huber was listed by United States intelligence as a funder of terrorism.

Huber was a figure in Holocaust denial, provided funding to Jürgen Graf and Ahmed Rami and maintained close links with the Institute for Historical Review, involved in their ultimately failed attempt to host an international Holocaust Denial Conference in Lebanon in 2001.

== Bibliography ==
- George Michael, The Enemy of My Enemy: The Alarming Convergence of Militant Islam and the Extreme Right, Lawrence: University Press of Kansas, 2006. ISBN 0-7006-1444-3
- Kevin Coogan, "The Mysterious Achmed Huber: Friend of Hitler, Allah...and Bin Laden?"
- Kevin Coogan, "Achmed Huber, the Avalon Gemeinschaft, and the Swiss 'New Right'"
- Transcript of interview with Huber on CNN, 5 March 2002
